= Christianity =

Abrahamic monotheistic religion

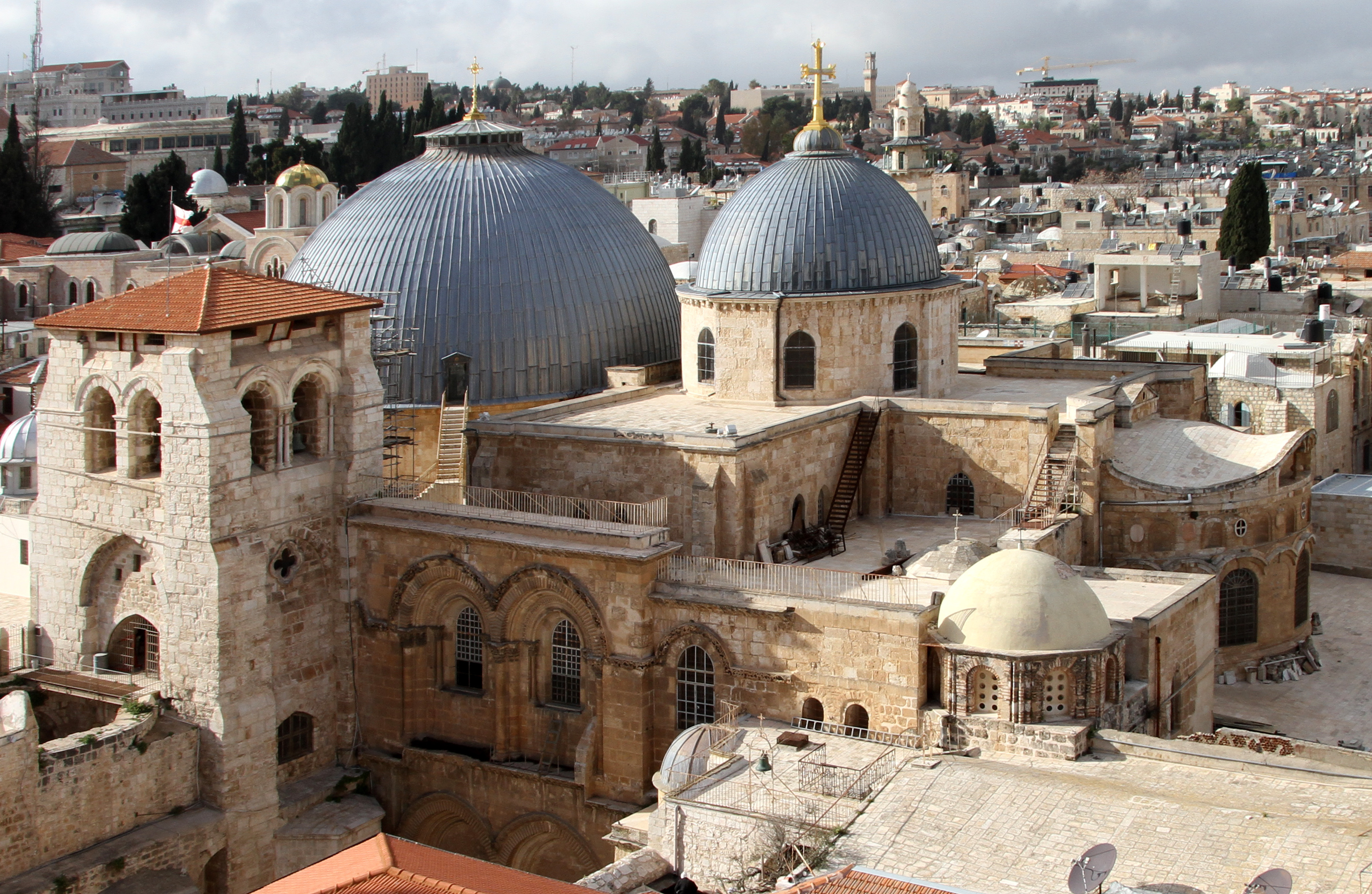
- The Church of the Holy Sepulchre in the Christian Quarter of the Old City of Jerusalem, a holy place of Christianity
- Classification: Abrahamic
- Scripture: Bible (Old and New Testament)
- Theology: Monotheistic
- Region: Worldwide
- Language: Biblical Hebrew; Biblical Aramaic; Biblical Greek; Ecclesiastical Latin
- Territory: Christendom
- Founder: Jesus
- Origin: 1st century AD; Jerusalem, Judaea, Roman Empire
- Separated from: Second Temple Judaism (Note: Christianity originated in 1st-century Judea from the Jewish Christian sect of Second Temple Judaism.)
- Number of followers: est. 2.3 billion ▲ (referred to as Christians)

Christianity is an Abrahamic monotheistic religion based on the Bible and the teachings of Jesus. The Gospels state that Jesus is the Son of God and rose from the dead after his crucifixion, whose coming as the messiah (Christ) was prophesied in the Old Testament and chronicled in the New Testament. It is the world's largest and most widespread religion with over 2.3 billion followers, comprising around 28.8% of the world population. Its adherents, known as Christians, are estimated to make up a majority of the population in 120 countries and territories.

Christianity remains culturally diverse in its Western and Eastern branches, and doctrinally diverse concerning justification and the nature of salvation, ecclesiology, ordination, and Christology. Most Christian denominations, however, generally hold in common the belief that Jesus is God the Son (Note: A small minority of Christians, such as the Unitarians, reject the belief that Jesus is God the Son.)—the Logos incarnated—who ministered, suffered, and died on a cross, but rose from the dead for the salvation of humankind; this message is called the gospel, meaning the "good news". The four canonical gospels of Matthew, Mark, Luke and John describe the life of Jesus and teachings as preserved in the early Christian tradition, with the Old Testament as the gospels' respected background.

Christianity began in the 1st century, after the death of Jesus, as a Judaic sect with Hellenistic influence in the Roman province of Judaea. The disciples of Jesus spread their faith around the Eastern Mediterranean area, despite significant persecution. The inclusion of Gentiles led Christianity to slowly separate from Judaism in the 2nd century. Emperor Constantine I decriminalized Christianity in the Roman Empire in 313 with the Edict of Milan. In 325, Constantine convened the Council of Nicaea, where the Nicene Creed was adopted, and where Early Christianity was consolidated into what would become the state religion by around 380. The Church of the East and Oriental Orthodoxy both split over differences in Christology during the 5th century, while the Eastern Orthodox Church and the Catholic Church separated in the East–West Schism in 1054. Protestantism split into numerous denominations from the Catholic Church during the Reformation era (16th century). Following the Age of Discovery (15th–17th century), Christianity expanded globally via missionary work, evangelism, immigration, and trade. Christianity played a prominent role in the development of Western civilization, particularly in Europe from late antiquity and the Middle Ages.

The three main branches of Christianity are Catholicism (1.3 billion people), Protestantism (800 million), (Note: The denominations of Adventism, Anabaptism (Amish, Apostolic, Bruderhof, Hutterites, Mennonites, River Brethren, and Schwarzenau Brethren), Anglicanism, Baptists, Lutheranism, Methodism, Moravianism/Hussites, Pentecostalism, Plymouth Brethren, Quakerism, Reformed Christianity (Congregationalists, Continental Reformed, and Presbyterians), and Waldensianism are the main families of Protestantism. Other groups that are sometimes regarded as Protestant include non-denominational Christian congregations.) and Eastern Orthodoxy (300 million), while other prominent branches include Oriental Orthodoxy (60 million) and Restorationism (35 million). (Note: The denominations of Restorationism include the Irvingians, Swedenborgians, Christadelphians, Latter Day Saints, Jehovah's Witnesses, La Luz del Mundo, and Iglesia ni Cristo.) Smaller church communities number in the thousands. In Christianity, efforts toward unity (ecumenism) are underway. In the West, Christianity remains the dominant religion even with a decline in adherence, with about 70% of that population identifying as Christian. Christianity is growing in Africa and Asia, the world's most populous continents. Many Christians are still persecuted in some regions of the world, particularly where they are a minority, such as in the Middle East, North Africa, East Asia, and South Asia.

== Etymology ==
Early Jewish Christians referred to themselves as being of 'The Way' (Koine Greek: τῆς ὁδοῦ, romanized: tês hodoû), an expression possibly coming from Isaiah 40:3, "prepare the way of the Lord". (Note: It appears in the Acts of the Apostles, Acts 9:2, Acts 19:9 and Acts 19:23. Some English translations of the New Testament capitalize 'the Way' (e.g. the New King James Version and the English Standard Version), indicating that this was how 'the new religion seemed then to be designated' whereas others treat the phrase as indicative—'the way', 'that way' or 'the way of the Lord'. The Syriac version reads, "the way of God" and the Vulgate Latin version, "the way of the Lord".) According to Acts 11:26, the term "Christian" (Χρῑστῐᾱνός, Khrīstiānós), meaning "followers of Christ" and referring to Jesus' disciples, was first used in the city of Antioch by the non-Jewish inhabitants there. The earliest recorded use of the term "Christianity/Christianism" (Χρῑστῐᾱνισμός, Khrīstiānismós) was by Ignatius of Antioch around 100 AD. The name Jesus comes from Ancient Greek: Ἰησοῦς (Iēsous), probably from Hebrew/Aramaic: יֵשׁוּעַ (Yēšūaʿ).

== History ==
=== Early Christianity ===
==== Apostolic Age ====
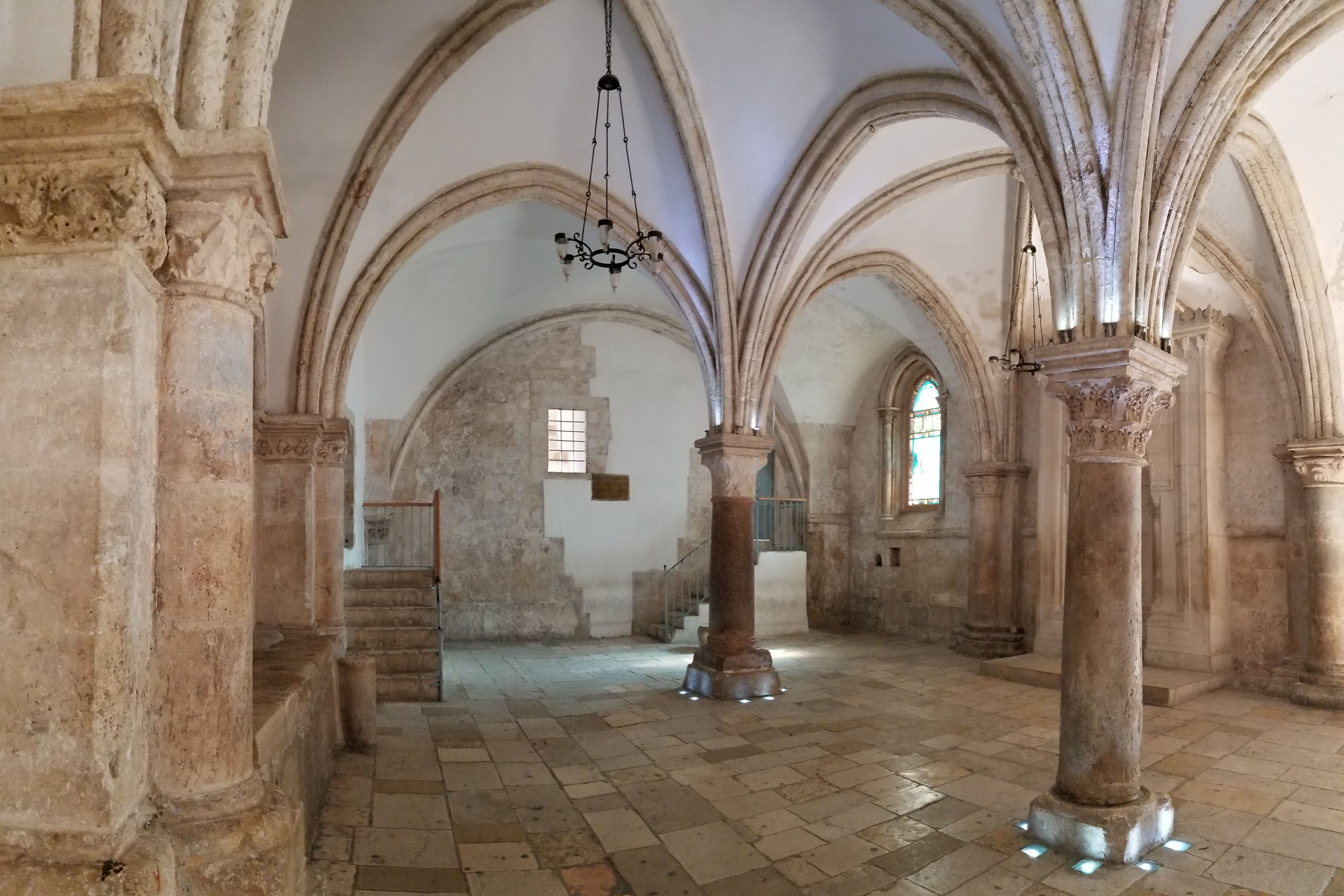
The Cenacle on Mount Zion in Jerusalem, claimed to be the location of the Last Supper and Pentecost

Christianity originated as a Jewish movement in Judaea during the 1st century AD, within the context of late Second Temple Judaism. The earliest followers of Jesus were Jews who understood his life, death and expected return through familiar Jewish apocalyptic and messianic frameworks. They remained embedded in Jewish religious life and did not initially conceive of themselves as departing from Israel or founding a new faith. Following their conviction that Jesus had been raised from the dead, they established a community in Jerusalem that awaited Jesus's return and eschatological renewal, seeking to spread this message throughout Israel and the Jewish diaspora. (Note: Many scholars consider the Parousia in the gospels to be contingent, though with detractors. The timing of the end in early Christian expectation is also debated.) Early Jewish Christianity maintained a high Christology alongside monotheism. This early community was led by the three Pillars of the Church, namely James the Just, Peter, and John. What eventually became of this earliest Christ-following community remains unclear; they were possibly displaced, relocated, or killed when the Romans destroyed Jerusalem in 70 AD.

Meanwhile, as the message about Jesus spread beyond Judea and Galilee into the broader Greco-Roman world, it increasingly attracted Gentile adherents, especially among "God-fearers": non-Jews who were attracted to Judaism and participated in synagogal worship without fully converting. This created a challenge for the movement's Jewish religious outlook, which insisted on close observance of the Jewish commandments. Against this backdrop, Paul the Apostle, a Jew of the Pharisaic school who had initially persecuted the Jesus movement, became one of its most influential missionaries following his conversion, focusing on spreading the message to non-Jews in the Eastern Mediterranean. Paul argued that Gentiles could participate in the promises of Israel through exclusive devotion to the God of Israel, faith in Christ, baptism, and participation in his death and resurrection, without full adherence to the Torah, including circumcision. This had a formative effect on the emerging Christian identity as separate from Judaism. Over time, such developments contributed to the gradual differentiation between the Jesus movement and other Jewish communities, a process that resulted in the emergence of Christianity as a separate religion.

==== Ante-Nicene period ====
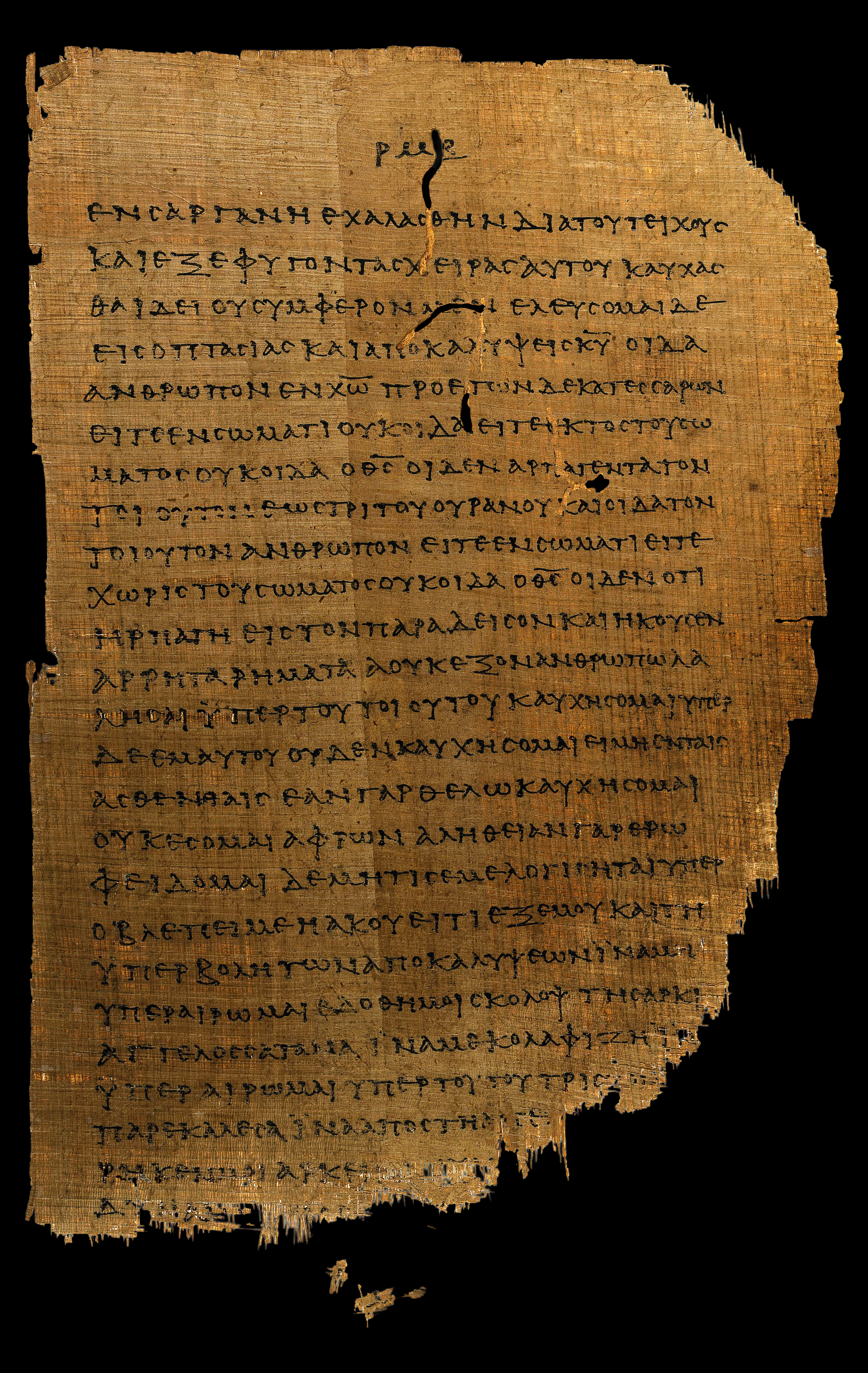
A folio from Papyrus 46, an early-3rd-century collection of Pauline epistles

This formative period was followed by the early bishops, whom Christians consider the successors of Christ's apostles. From the year 150, Christian teachers began to produce theological and apologetic works aimed at defending the faith. These authors are known as the Church Fathers, and the study of them is called patristics. Notable early Fathers include Ignatius of Antioch, Polycarp, Justin Martyr, Irenaeus, Tertullian, Clement of Alexandria and Origen.

During this period, there was no unified Christian movement but rather multiple competing sects, which held radically different beliefs. Christian authors began using the Greek term hairesis, meaning "school of thought", to describe rival communities, which gave rise to the concept of heresy. In the second and third centuries, figures like Justin Martyr, Irenaeus, Tertullian, and Clement of Alexandria, often retrospectively referred to as "proto-orthodox", insisting that there was one original apostolic teaching and that all rivals had deviated from it. Meanwhile, Valentinus, an Alexandrian teacher, developed a Gnostic theology in which Christ brought saving knowledge (gnosis) that enabled believers to be redeemed from the material world. Marcion, from Sinope, drew a distinction between high, purely good god, father of Christ, and the lower, merely "just" god of Israel, who demanded sacrifice and procreation. Marcion is also known to have assembled a collection of Christian texts, including his own gospel, and in doing so created one of the earliest known Christian scriptural canons. Justin Martyr, from Neapolis, disagreed with both, arguing the God of the Jewish scriptures was Christ himself before his incarnation. A gradual splitting off of Gentile Christianity left Jewish Christians continuing to follow the Law of Moses, including practices such as circumcision. By the fifth century, they and the Jewish–Christian gospels would be largely suppressed by the dominant sects in both Judaism and Christianity.

Christianity occupied an unstable position within the Roman world. In antiquity, what moderns call "religion" was closely associated with ancestral traditions and embedded within other aspects of ethnic identity. It is possible that Gentile Christians, having rejected their native gods, were perceived by their pagan neighbors as disrupting the relationship between the divine and the community, on which civic welfare depended. Early examples of persecution of Christians include the Acts of the Apostles, which portrays Saint Stephen as being killed by a mob in Jerusalem, while Paul writes that he himself had persecuted Christians prior to his vision of Christ. Additionally, Tacitus wrote that Emperor Nero blamed Christians for the Great Fire of Rome in 64 AD. In the following centuries, Church Fathers recorded accusations that Christians were responsible for droughts, famines, and plagues. Nevertheless, before the mid-3rd century, persecutions were often reactive, sporadic and local. This changed in 249, when the emperor Decius, who ruled the empire following a long period of instability, ordered all residents of the empire (except Jews) to perform a sacrifice to the Roman gods. Jews had long been excused on the basis of ancestral custom in ways that Christians, lacking any such established tradition, were not. The Diocletianic Persecution beginning in 303 was particularly severe; Christians were accused of attracting demons that disrupted traditional cult practices and threatened public order, and were subjected to confiscations, destruction of buildings, expulsions, imprisonment, and demands for sacrifice. The situation changed under Constantine (r. 306–337), who granted imperial support to Christianity, though under his rule and that of his successors, forms deemed heretical were suppressed.

=== Spread in the Roman Empire ===
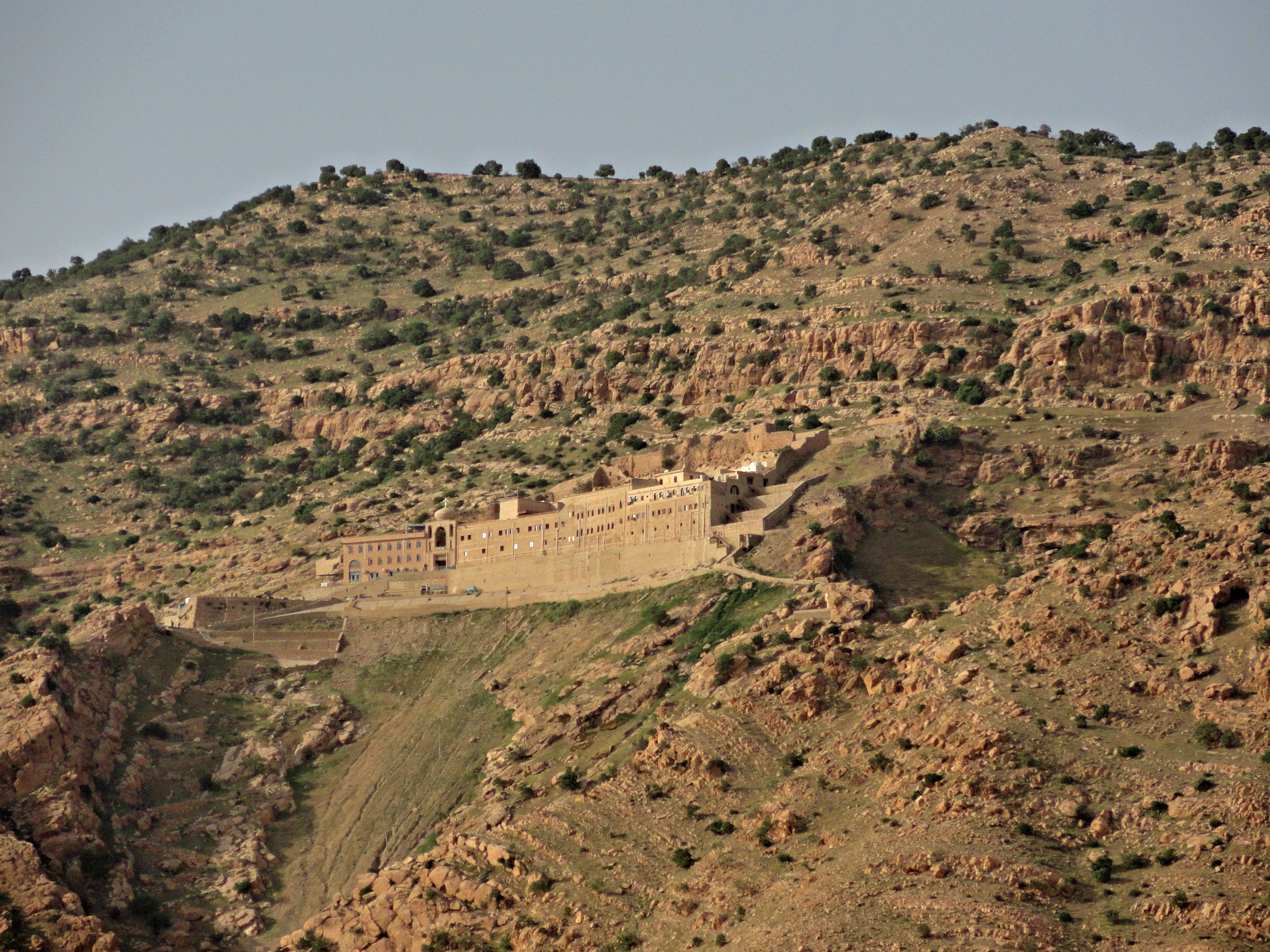
The Monastery of St. Matthew, located atop Mount Alfaf in northern Iraq, is recognized as one of the oldest Christian monasteries in existence.

Christianity spread to Aramaic-speaking peoples along the Mediterranean coast and also to the inland parts of the Roman Empire and beyond that into the Parthian Empire and the later Sasanian Empire, including Mesopotamia, which was dominated at different times and to varying extents by these empires. The presence of Christianity in Africa began in the middle of the 1st century in Egypt and by the end of the 2nd century in the region around Carthage. Mark the Evangelist is claimed to have started the Church of Alexandria in about 43 AD; various later churches claim this as their own legacy, including the Coptic Orthodox Church. Important Africans who influenced the early development of Christianity include Tertullian, Clement of Alexandria, Origen of Alexandria, Cyprian, Athanasius, and Augustine of Hippo.

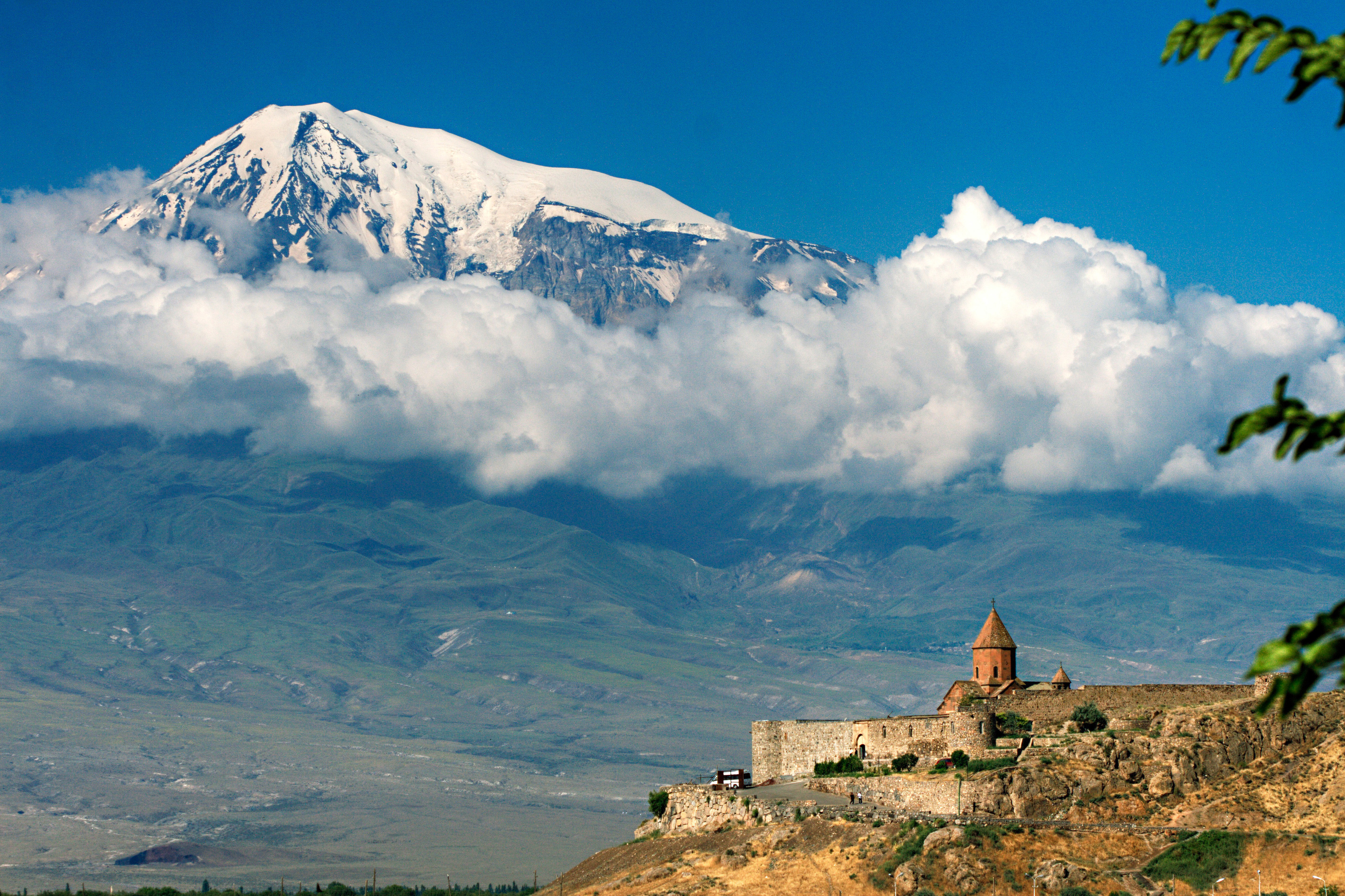
The 7th-century Khor Virap monastery in the shadow of Mount Ararat; Armenia was the first state to adopt Christianity as the state religion in the early 4th century AD.

King Tiridates III made Christianity the state religion in Armenia in the early 4th century, making Armenia the first officially Christian state. It was not an entirely new religion in Armenia, having penetrated into the country from at least the third century, but it may have been present even earlier.

Constantine I was exposed to Christianity in his youth, and throughout his life his support for the religion grew, culminating in baptism on his deathbed. During his reign, state-sanctioned persecution of Christians was ended with the Edict of Toleration in 311 and the Edict of Milan in 313. At that point, Christianity was still a minority belief, comprising perhaps only 5% of the Roman population. Influenced by his adviser Mardonius, Constantine's nephew Julian unsuccessfully tried to suppress Christianity. On 27 February 380, Theodosius I, Gratian, and Valentinian II issued the Edict of Thessalonica establishing Nicene Christianity as the State church of the Roman Empire. As soon as it became connected to the state, Christianity grew wealthy; the Church solicited donations from the rich and could now own land.

Constantine was also instrumental in the convocation of the First Council of Nicaea in 325, which sought to address Arianism and formulated the Nicene Creed, which is still used by in Catholicism, Eastern Orthodoxy, Lutheranism, Anglicanism, and many other Protestant churches. Nicaea was the first of a series of ecumenical councils, which formally defined critical elements of the theology of the Church, notably concerning Christology. The Church of the East did not accept the third and following ecumenical councils and is still separate today by its successors (Assyrian Church of the East).

In terms of prosperity and cultural life, the Byzantine Empire was one of the peaks in Christian history and Christian civilization, and Constantinople remained the leading city of the Christian world in size, wealth, and culture. There was a renewed interest in classical Greek philosophy, as well as an increase in literary output in vernacular Greek. Byzantine art and literature held a preeminent place in Europe, and the cultural impact of Byzantine art on the West during this period was enormous and of long-lasting significance. The later rise of Islam in North Africa reduced the size and numbers of Christian congregations, leaving in large numbers only the Coptic Church in Egypt, the Ethiopian Orthodox Tewahedo Church in the Horn of Africa and the Nubian Church in the Sudan (Nobatia, Makuria and Alodia).

=== Middle Ages ===
==== Early Middle Ages ====
With the decline and fall of the Roman Empire in the West, the papacy became a political player, first visible in Pope Leo's diplomatic dealings with Huns and Vandals. The church also entered into a long period of missionary activity and expansion among the various tribes. While Arianists instituted the death penalty for practicing pagans (see the Massacre of Verden, for example), Catholicism also spread among the Hungarians, the Germanic, the Celtic, the Baltic and some Slavic peoples.

Around 500, Christianity was thoroughly integrated into Byzantine and Kingdom of Italy culture and Benedict of Nursia set out his Monastic Rule, establishing a system of regulations for the foundation and running of monasteries. Monasticism became a powerful force throughout Europe, and gave rise to many early centers of learning, most famously in Ireland, Scotland, and Gaul, contributing to the Carolingian Renaissance of the 9th century.

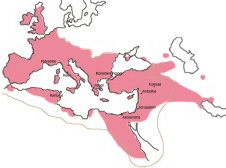
Christendom by AD 600 after its spread to Africa and Europe from the Middle East

In the 7th century, Muslims conquered Syria (including Jerusalem), North Africa, and Spain, converting some of the Christian population to Islam, including some of the Christian populations in pre-Islamic Arabia, and placing the rest under a separate legal status. Part of the Muslims' success was due to the exhaustion of the Byzantine Empire in its decades long conflict with Persia. Beginning in the 8th century, with the rise of Carolingian leaders, the Papacy sought greater political support in the Frankish Kingdom.

The Middle Ages brought about major changes within the church. Pope Gregory the Great dramatically reformed the ecclesiastical structure and administration. In the early 8th century, iconoclasm became a divisive issue, when it was sponsored by the Byzantine emperors. The Second Ecumenical Council of Nicaea (787) finally pronounced in favor of icons. In the early 10th century, Western Christian monasticism was further rejuvenated through the leadership of the great Benedictine monastery of Cluny.

==== High and Late Middle Ages ====
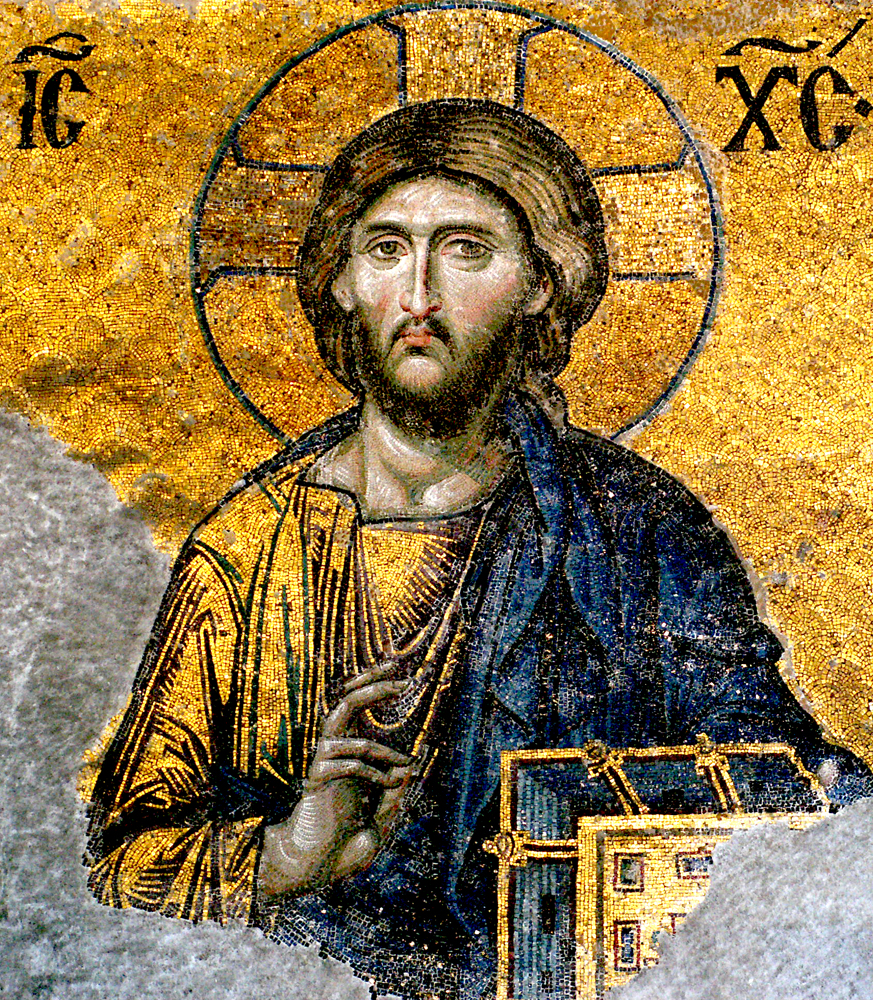
An example of Byzantine pictorial art, the Deësis mosaic at the Hagia Sophia in Constantinople

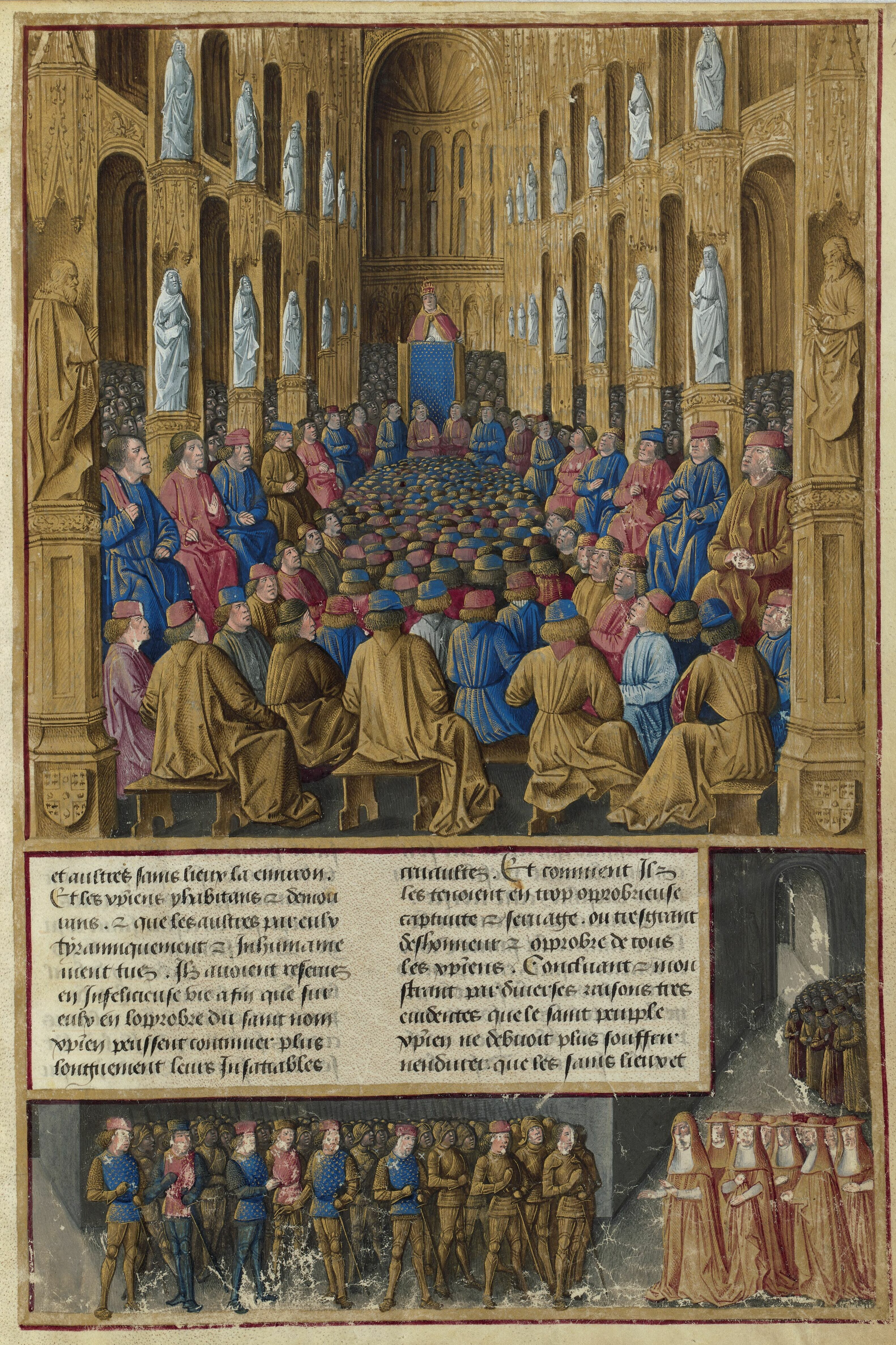
Pope Urban II at the Council of Clermont, where he preached the First Crusade. Illustration by Jean Colombe from the Passages d'outremer, c. 1490.

In the West, from the 11th century onward, some older cathedral schools became universities (see, for example, University of Oxford, University of Paris and University of Bologna). Previously, higher education had been the domain of Christian cathedral schools or monastic schools (Scholae monasticae), led by monks and nuns. Evidence of such schools dates back to the 6th century AD. These new universities expanded the curriculum to include academic programs for clerics, lawyers, civil servants, and physicians. The university is generally regarded as an institution that has its origin in the Medieval Christian setting.

Accompanying the rise of the "new towns" throughout Europe, mendicant orders were founded, bringing the consecrated religious life out of the monastery and into the new urban setting. The two principal mendicant movements were the Franciscans and the Dominicans, founded by Francis of Assisi and Dominic, respectively. Both orders made significant contributions to the development of the great universities of Europe. Another new order was the Cistercians, whose large, isolated monasteries spearheaded the settlement of former wilderness areas. In this period, church building and ecclesiastical architecture reached new heights, culminating in the orders of Romanesque and Gothic architecture and the building of the great European cathedrals.

Christian nationalism emerged during this era in which Christians felt the desire to recover lands in which Christianity had historically flourished. From 1095 under the pontificate of Urban II, the First Crusade was launched. These were a series of military campaigns in the Holy Land and elsewhere, initiated in response to pleas from the Byzantine Emperor Alexios I for aid against Turkish expansion. The Crusades ultimately failed to stifle Islamic aggression and even contributed to Christian enmity with the sacking of Constantinople during the Fourth Crusade.

The Christian Church experienced internal conflict between the 7th and 13th centuries that resulted in a schism between the Latin Church of Western Christianity branch, the now-Catholic Church, and an Eastern, largely Greek, branch (the Eastern Orthodox Church). The two sides disagreed on a number of administrative, liturgical and doctrinal issues, most prominently Eastern Orthodox opposition to papal supremacy. The Second Council of Lyon (1274) and the Council of Florence (1439) attempted to reunite the churches, but in both cases, the Eastern Orthodox refused to implement the decisions, and the two principal churches remain in schism to the present day. However, the Catholic Church has achieved union with various smaller eastern churches.

In the thirteenth century, a new emphasis on Jesus' suffering, exemplified by the Franciscans' preaching, had the consequence of turning worshippers' attention towards Jews, on whom Christians had placed the blame for Jesus' death. Christianity's limited tolerance of Jews was not new—Augustine of Hippo said that Jews should not be allowed to enjoy the citizenship that Christians took for granted—but the growing antipathy towards Jews was a factor that led to the expulsion of Jews from England in 1290, the first of many such expulsions in Europe.

Beginning around 1184, following the crusade against Cathar heresy, various institutions, broadly referred to as the Inquisition, were established with the aim of suppressing heresy and securing religious and doctrinal unity within Christianity through conversion and prosecution.

=== Modern era ===
==== Reformation and response ====
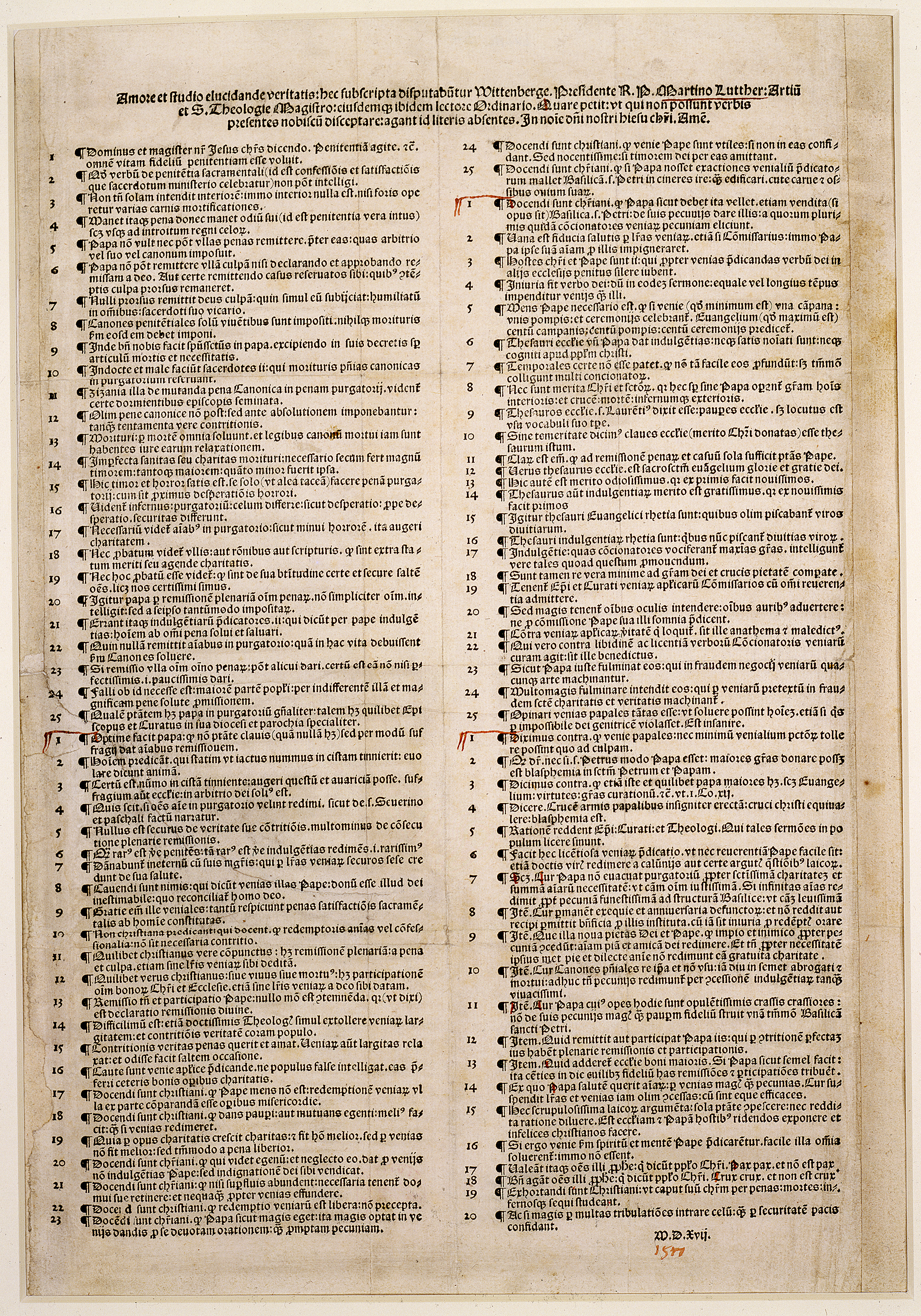
Martin Luther initiated the Reformation with his Ninety-five Theses in 1517.

The 15th-century Renaissance brought about a renewed interest in ancient and classical learning. During the Reformation, Martin Luther posted the Ninety-five Theses 1517 against the sale of indulgences. Printed copies soon spread throughout Europe. In 1521 the Edict of Worms condemned and excommunicated Luther and his followers, resulting in the schism of the Western Christendom into several branches.

Other reformers like Zwingli, Oecolampadius, Calvin, Knox, and Arminius further criticized Catholic teaching and worship. These challenges developed into the movement called Protestantism, which repudiated the primacy of the pope, the role of tradition, the seven sacraments, and other doctrines and practices. The Reformation in England began in 1534, when King Henry VIII had himself declared head of the Church of England. Beginning in 1536, the monasteries throughout England, Wales and Ireland were dissolved.

Thomas Müntzer, Andreas Karlstadt and other theologians perceived both the Catholic Church and the confessions of the Magisterial Reformation as corrupted. Their activity brought about the Radical Reformation, which gave birth to various Anabaptist denominations.

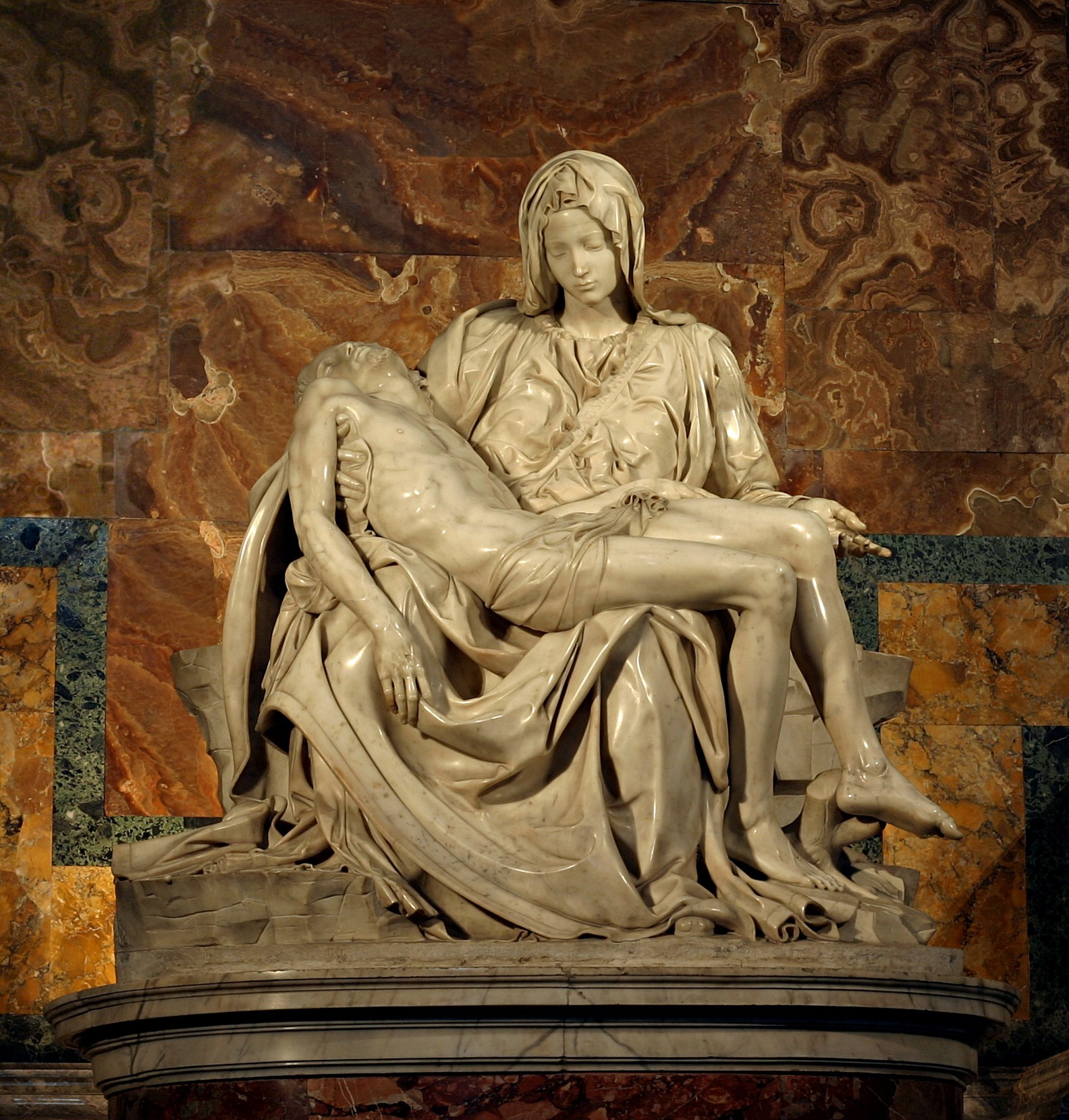
Michelangelo's 1498–99 Pietà in St. Peter's Basilica; the Catholic Church was among the patronages of the Renaissance.

Partly in response to the Protestant Reformation, the Catholic Church engaged in a substantial process of reform and renewal, known as the Counter-Reformation or Catholic Reform. The Council of Trent clarified and reasserted Catholic doctrine. During the following centuries, competition between Catholicism and Protestantism became deeply entangled with political struggles among European states.

Meanwhile, the discovery of America by Christopher Columbus in 1492 brought about a new wave of missionary activity. Partly from missionary zeal, but under the impetus of colonial expansion by the European powers, Christianity spread to the Americas, Oceania, East Asia and sub-Saharan Africa.

Throughout Europe, the division caused by the Reformation led to outbreaks of religious violence and the establishment of separate state churches in Europe. Lutheranism spread into the northern, central, and eastern parts of present-day Germany, Livonia, and Scandinavia. Anglicanism was established in England in 1534. Calvinism and its varieties, such as Presbyterianism, were introduced in Scotland, the Netherlands, Hungary, Switzerland, and France. Arminianism gained followers in the Netherlands and Frisia. Ultimately, these differences led to the outbreak of conflicts in which religion played a key factor. The Thirty Years' War, the English Civil War, and the French Wars of Religion are prominent examples. These events intensified the Christian debate on persecution and toleration.

In the revival of neoplatonism Renaissance humanists did not reject Christianity; quite the contrary, many of the greatest works of the Renaissance were devoted to it, and the Catholic Church patronized many works of Renaissance art. Much, if not most, of the new art was commissioned by or in dedication to the Church. Some scholars and historians attribute Christianity to having contributed to the rise of the Scientific Revolution. Many well-known historical figures who influenced Western science considered themselves Christian such as Nicolaus Copernicus, Galileo Galilei, Johannes Kepler, Isaac Newton and Robert Boyle.

==== Post-Enlightenment ====
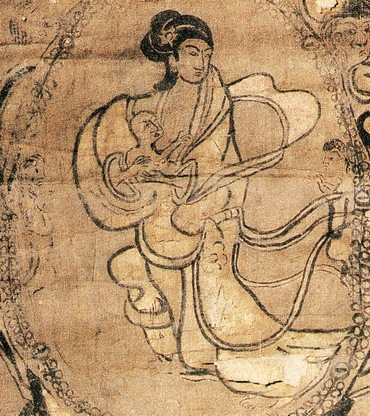
A depiction of Madonna and Child in a 19th-century Kakure Kirishitan Japanese woodcut

In the era known as the Great Divergence, when in the West, the Age of Enlightenment and the Scientific Revolution brought about great societal changes, Christianity was confronted with various forms of skepticism and with certain modern political ideologies, such as versions of socialism and liberalism. Events ranged from mere anti-clericalism to violent outbursts against Christianity, such as the dechristianization of France during the French Revolution, the Spanish Civil War, and certain Marxist movements, especially the Russian Revolution and the persecution of Christians in the Soviet Union under state atheism.

Especially pressing in Europe was the formation of nation states after the Napoleonic era. In all European countries, different Christian denominations found themselves in competition to greater or lesser extents with each other and with the state. Variables were the relative sizes of the denominations and the religious, political, and ideological orientation of the states. Urs Altermatt of the University of Fribourg, looking specifically at Catholicism in Europe, identifies four models for the European nations. In traditionally Catholic-majority countries such as Belgium, Spain, and Austria, to some extent, religious and national communities are more or less identical. Cultural symbiosis and separation are found in Poland, the Republic of Ireland, and Switzerland, all countries with competing denominations. Competition is found in Germany, the Netherlands, and again Switzerland, all countries with minority Catholic populations, which to a greater or lesser extent identified with the nation. Finally, separation between religion (again, specifically Catholicism) and the state is found to a great degree in France and Italy, countries where the state actively opposed itself to the authority of the Catholic Church.

The combined factors of the formation of nation states and ultramontanism, especially in Germany and the Netherlands, but also in England to a much lesser extent, often forced Catholic churches, organizations, and believers to choose between the national demands of the state and the authority of the Church, specifically the papacy. This conflict came to a head in the First Vatican Council, and in Germany would lead directly to the Kulturkampf.

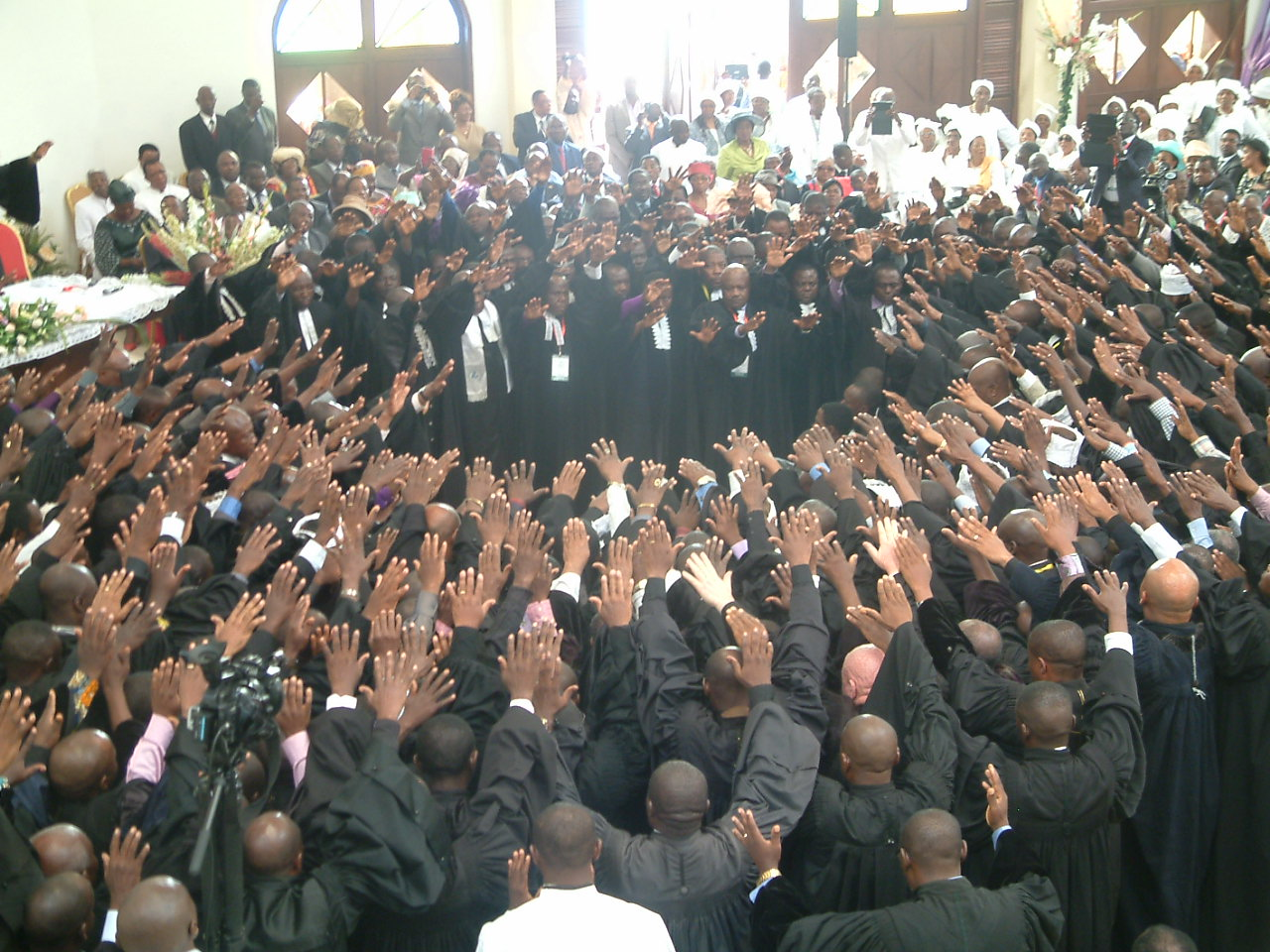
Ordination of new pastors in Cameroon, 2014

Christian commitment in Europe dropped as modernity and secularism came into their own, particularly in the Czech Republic and Estonia, while religious commitments in America have been generally high in comparison to Europe. Changes in worldwide Christianity over the last century have been significant, since 1900, Christianity has spread rapidly in the Global South and Third World countries. The late 20th century has shown the shift of Christian adherence to the Third World and the Southern Hemisphere in general, with the West no longer the chief standard bearer of Christianity. Approximately 7 to 10% of Arabs are Christians, most prevalent in Egypt, Syria and Lebanon.

== Beliefs ==
While Christians worldwide share basic convictions, there are differences of interpretations and opinions of the Bible and sacred traditions on which Christianity is based. Christianity encompasses various movements of Christian theology, the main ones being conservative fundamentalist or moderate, liberal and progressive.

=== Creeds ===
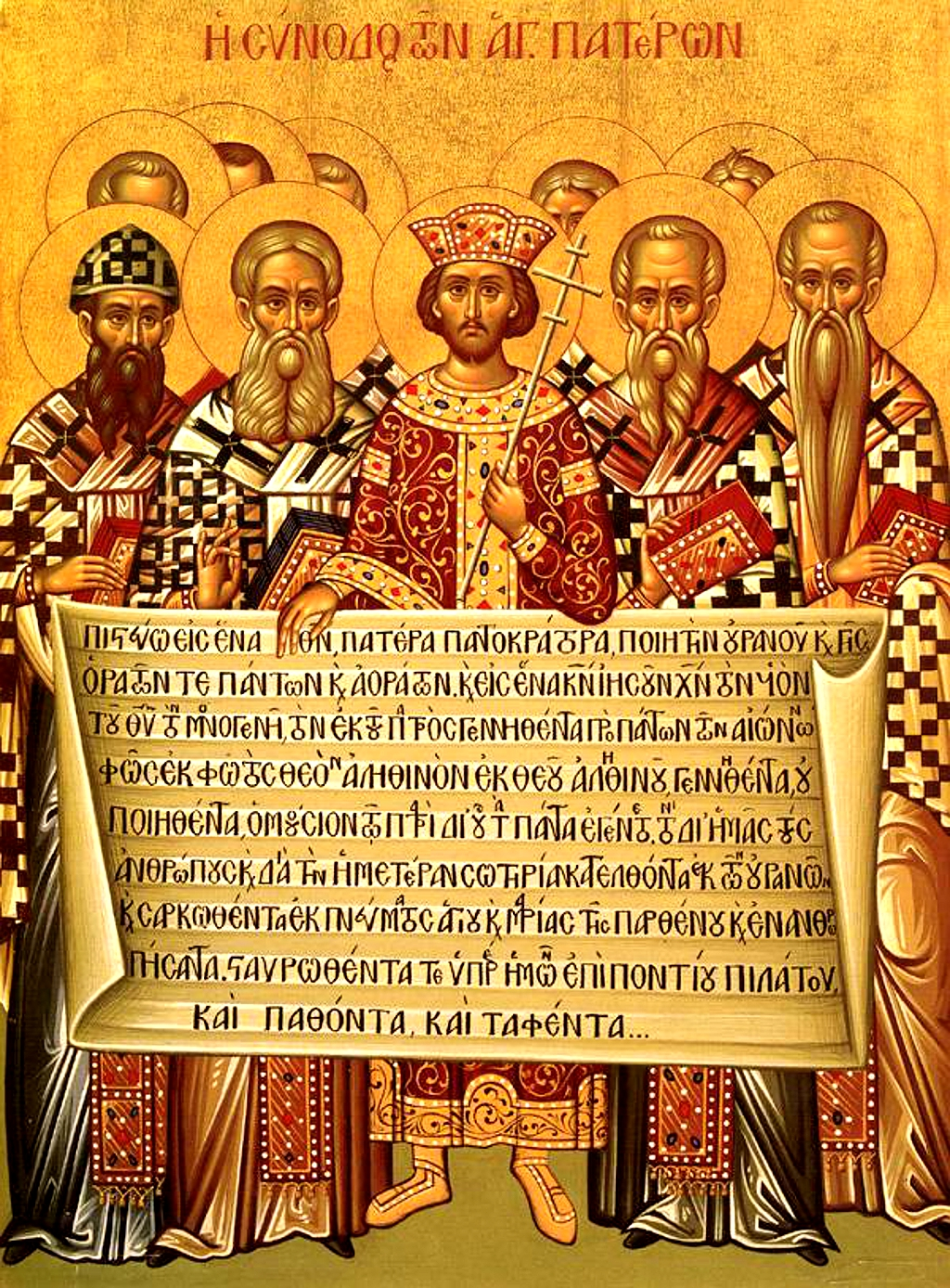
An Eastern Christian icon depicting Emperor Constantine and the Fathers of the First Council of Nicaea (325) as holding the Niceno–Constantinopolitan Creed of 381

Concise doctrinal statements or confessions of religious beliefs are known as creeds. They began as baptismal formulae and were later expanded during the Christological controversies of the 4th and 5th centuries to become statements of faith. "Jesus is Lord" is the earliest creed of Christianity and continues to be used, as with the World Council of Churches.

The Apostles' Creed is the most widely accepted statement of the articles of Christian faith. It is used by a number of Christian denominations for both liturgical and catechetical purposes, most visibly by liturgical churches of Western Christian tradition, including the Latin Church of the Catholic Church, Lutheranism, Anglicanism, and Western Rite Orthodoxy. It is also used by Presbyterians, Methodists, and Congregationalists.

This particular creed was developed between the 2nd and 9th centuries. Its central doctrines are those of the Trinity and God the Creator. Each of the doctrines found in this creed can be traced to statements current in the apostolic period. The creed was apparently used as a summary of Christian doctrine for baptismal candidates in the churches of Rome. Its points include:

- Belief in God the Father, Jesus Christ as the Son of God, and the Holy Spirit
- The death, descent into hell, resurrection and ascension of Christ
- The holiness of the Church and the communion of saints
- Christ's second coming, the Day of Judgement and salvation of the faithful

The Nicene Creed was formulated, largely in response to Arianism, at the Councils of Nicaea and Constantinople in 325 and 381 respectively, and ratified as the universal creed of Christendom by the First Council of Ephesus in 431.

The Chalcedonian Definition, or Creed of Chalcedon, developed at the Council of Chalcedon in 451, though rejected by the Oriental Orthodox, taught Christ "to be acknowledged in two natures, inconfusedly, unchangeably, indivisibly, inseparably": one divine and one human, and that both natures, while perfect in themselves, are nevertheless also perfectly united into one person.

The Athanasian Creed, received in the Western Church as having the same status as the Nicene and Chalcedonian, says: "We worship one God in Trinity, and Trinity in Unity; neither confounding the Persons nor dividing the Substance".

Most Christians (Catholic, Eastern Orthodox, Oriental Orthodox, and Protestant alike) accept the use of creeds and subscribe to at least one of the creeds mentioned above.

Certain Evangelical Protestants, though not all of them, reject creeds as definitive statements of faith, even while agreeing with some or all of the substance of the creeds. Also rejecting creeds are groups with roots in the Restoration Movement, such as the Christian Church (Disciples of Christ), the Evangelical Christian Church in Canada, and the Churches of Christ.

=== Jesus ===
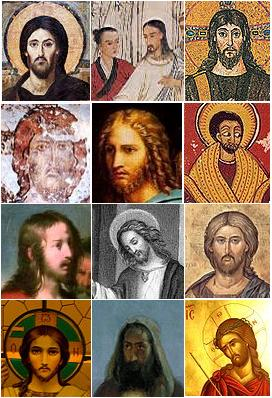
Various depictions of Jesus

The central tenet of Christianity is the belief in Jesus as the Son of God and the Messiah (Christ). Christians believe that Jesus, as the Messiah, was anointed by God as savior of humanity and hold that Jesus' coming was the fulfillment of messianic prophecies of the Old Testament. The Christian concept of messiah differs significantly from the contemporary Jewish concept. The core Christian belief is that through belief in and acceptance of the death and resurrection of Jesus, sinful humans can be reconciled to God, and thereby are offered salvation and the promise of eternal life.

While there have been many theological disputes over the nature of Jesus over the earliest centuries of Christian history, generally, Christians believe that Jesus is God incarnate and "true God and true man" (or both fully divine and fully human). Jesus, having become fully human, suffered the pains and temptations of a mortal man, but did not sin. As fully God, he rose to life again. According to the New Testament, he rose from the dead, ascended to heaven, is seated at the right hand of the Father, and will ultimately return to fulfill the rest of the Messianic prophecy, including the resurrection of the dead, the Last Judgment, and the final establishment of the Kingdom of God.

According to the canonical gospels of Matthew and Luke, Jesus was conceived by the Holy Spirit and born from the Virgin Mary. Little of Jesus' childhood is recorded in the canonical gospels, although infancy gospels were popular in antiquity. In comparison, his adulthood, especially the week before his death, is well documented in the gospels contained within the New Testament, because that part of his life is believed to be most important. The biblical accounts of Jesus' ministry include: his baptism, miracles, preaching, teaching, and deeds.

==== Death and resurrection ====
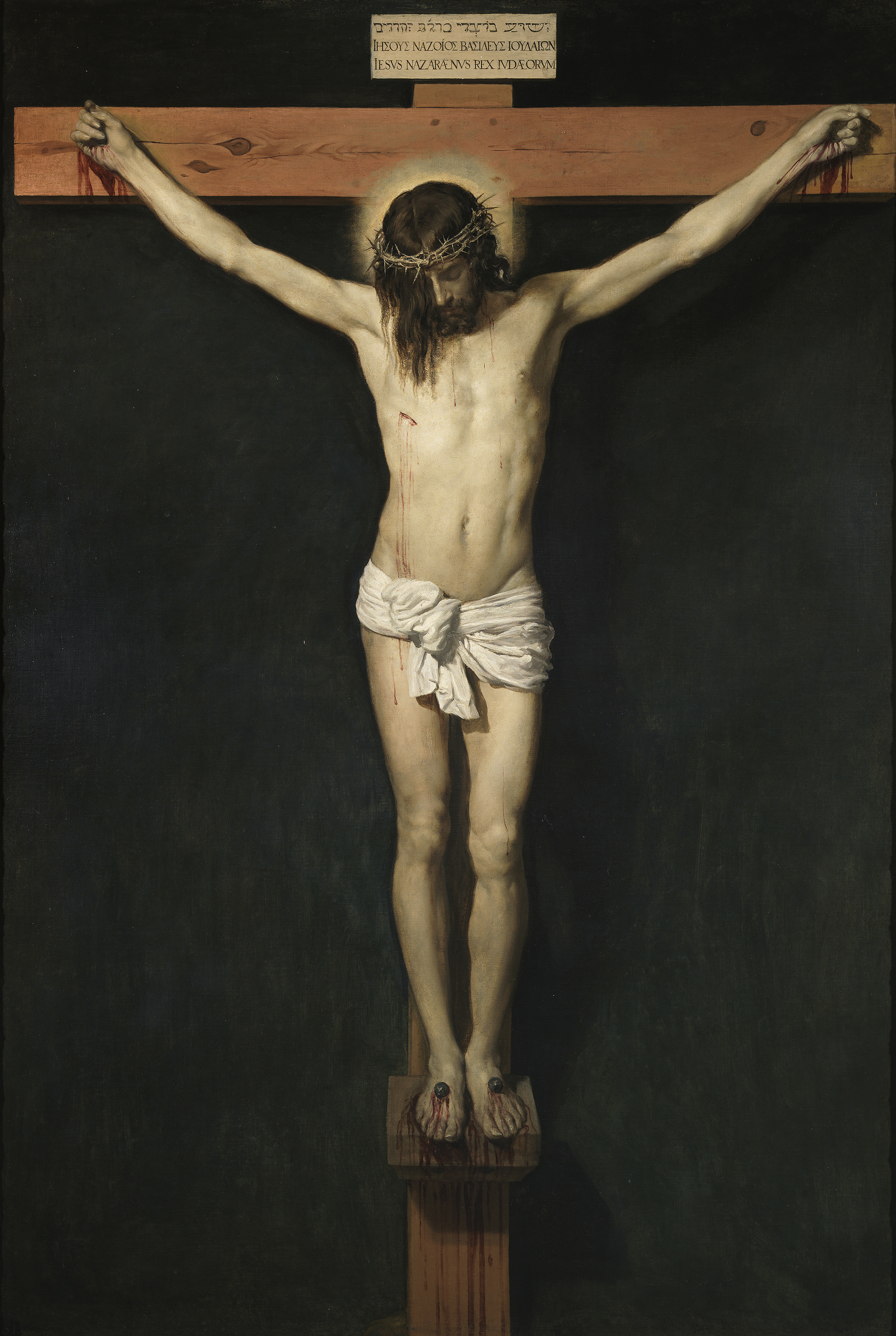
Crucifixion, representing the death of Jesus on the Cross, painting by Diego Velázquez, c. 1632

Christians consider the resurrection of Jesus to be the cornerstone of their faith (see 1 Corinthians 15). Among Christian beliefs, the death and resurrection of Jesus are two core events on which much of Christian doctrine and theology is based. According to the New Testament, Jesus was crucified, died a physical death, was buried within a tomb, and rose from the dead three days later.

The New Testament mentions several post-resurrection appearances of Jesus on different occasions to his twelve apostles and disciples, including "more than five hundred brethren at once", before Jesus' ascension to heaven. Jesus' death and resurrection are commemorated by Christians in all worship services, with special emphasis during Holy Week, which includes Good Friday and Easter Sunday.

The death and resurrection of Jesus are usually considered the most important events in Christian theology, partly because they demonstrate that Jesus has power over life and death and therefore has the authority and power to give people eternal life.

Christian churches accept and teach the New Testament account of the resurrection of Jesus with very few exceptions. Some modern scholars use the belief of Jesus' followers in the resurrection as a point of departure for establishing the continuity of the historical Jesus and the proclamation of the early church. Some liberal Christians do not accept a literal bodily resurrection, seeing the story as richly symbolic and spiritually nourishing myth. Arguments over death and resurrection claims occur at many religious debates and interfaith dialogues. Paul the Apostle, an early Christian convert and missionary, wrote, "If Christ was not raised, then all our preaching is useless, and your trust in God is useless".

=== Salvation ===
"For God so loved the world that he gave his one and only Son, that whoever believes in him shall not perish but have eternal life".

— John 3:16, NIV

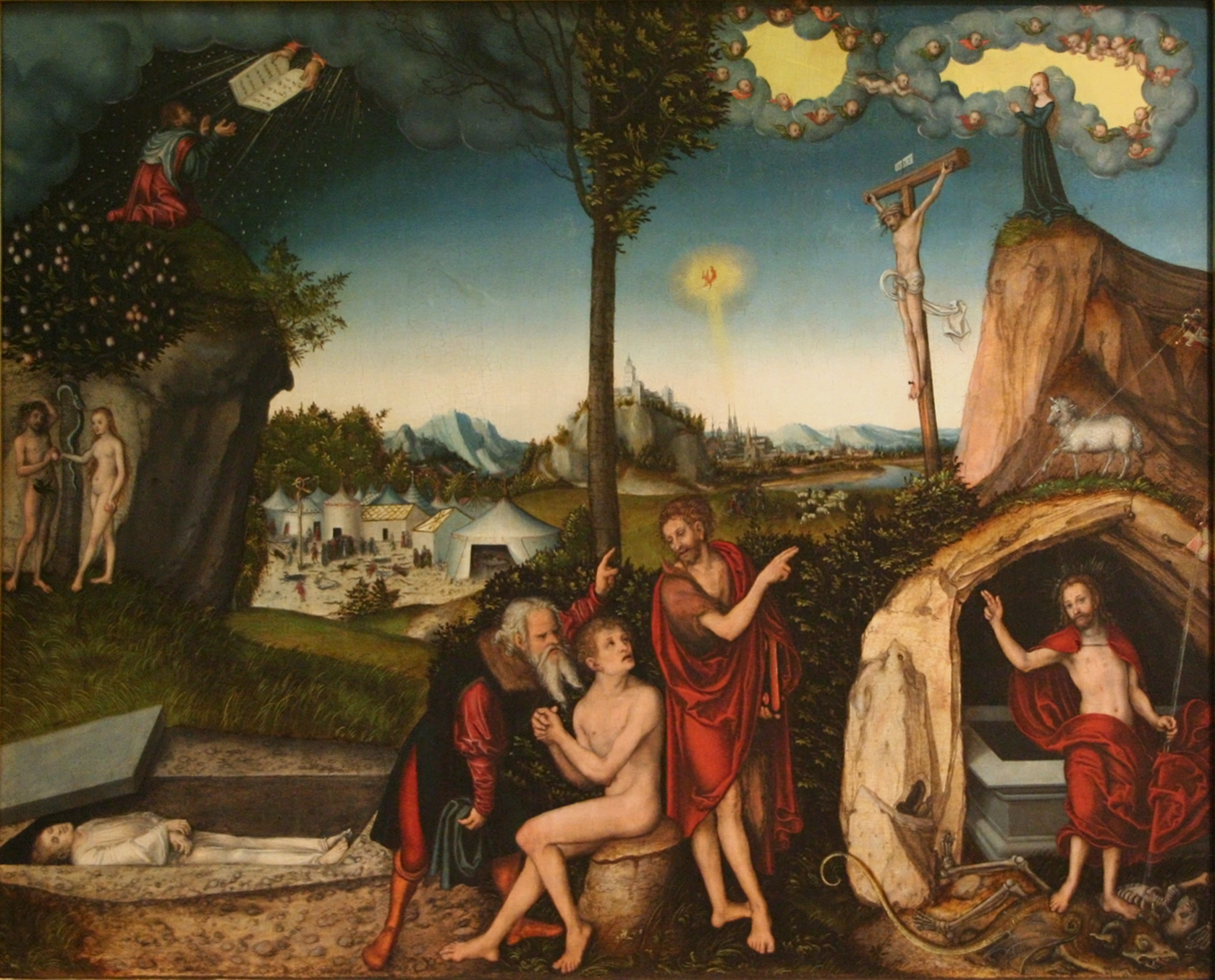
The Law and the Gospel by Lucas Cranach the Elder (1529); Moses and Elijah point the sinner to Jesus for salvation.

Paul the Apostle, like Jews and Roman pagans of his time, believed that sacrifice can bring about new kinship ties, purity, and eternal life. For Paul, the necessary sacrifice was the death of Jesus: Gentiles who are "Christ's" are, like Israel, descendants of Abraham and "heirs according to the promise" The God who raised Jesus from the dead would also give new life to the "mortal bodies" of Gentile Christians, who had become with Israel, the "children of God", and were therefore no longer "in the flesh".

Modern Christian churches tend to be much more concerned with how humanity can be saved from a universal condition of sin and death than the question of how both Jews and Gentiles can be in God's family. According to Eastern Orthodox theology, based upon their understanding of the atonement as put forward by Irenaeus' recapitulation theory, Jesus' death is a ransom. This restores the relation with God, who is loving and reaches out to humanity, and offers the possibility of theosis c.q. divinization, becoming the kind of humans God wants humanity to be. The Catholic church also holds to a form of ransom theory but also teaches that Jesus' death satisfies the debt to the Father incurred by the sins of humanity. The Catholic Church further affirms that salvation does not occur without faithfulness on the part of Christians; converts must live in accordance with principles of love and ordinarily must be baptized. In Protestant theology, Jesus' death is regarded as a substitutionary penalty carried by Jesus, for the debt that has to be paid by humankind when it broke God's moral law.

Christians differ in their views on the extent to which individuals' salvation is pre-ordained by God. Reformed theology places distinctive emphasis on grace by teaching that individuals are completely incapable of self-redemption, but that sanctifying grace is irresistible. In contrast Catholics, Orthodox Christians, and Arminian Protestants believe that the exercise of free will is necessary to have faith in Jesus.

=== Trinity ===
The Trinity is the belief that God is one God in three persons: the Father, the Son (Jesus), and the Holy Spirit.

Trinity refers to the teaching that the one God comprises three distinct, eternally co-existing persons: the Father, the Son (incarnate in Jesus Christ) and the Holy Spirit. Together, these three persons are sometimes called the Godhead, although there is no single term in use in Scripture to denote the unified Godhead. In the words of the Athanasian Creed, an early statement of Christian belief, "the Father is God, the Son is God, and the Holy Spirit is God, and yet there are not three Gods but one God". They are distinct from another: the Father has no source, the Son is begotten of the Father, and the Spirit proceeds from the Father. Though distinct, the three persons cannot be divided from one another in being or in operation. While some Christians also believe that God appeared as the Father in the Old Testament, it is agreed that he appeared as the Son in the New Testament and will still continue to manifest as the Holy Spirit in the present. But still, God still existed as three persons in each of these times. However, traditionally there is a belief that it was the Son who appeared in the Old Testament because, for example, when the Trinity is depicted in art, the Son typically has the distinctive appearance, a cruciform halo identifying Christ, and in depictions of the Garden of Eden, this looks forward to an Incarnation yet to occur. In some Early Christian sarcophagi, the Logos is distinguished with a beard, "which allows him to appear ancient, even pre-existent".

The Trinity is an essential doctrine of mainstream Christianity. From earlier than the times of the Nicene Creed (325) Christianity advocated the triune mystery-nature of God as a normative profession of faith. According to Roger E. Olson and Christopher Hall, through prayer, meditation, study and practice, the Christian community concluded "that God must exist as both a unity and trinity", codifying this in ecumenical council at the end of the 4th century.

According to this doctrine, God is not divided in the sense that each person has a third of the whole; rather, each person is considered to be fully God (see Perichoresis). The distinction lies in their relations, the Father being unbegotten; the Son being begotten of the Father; and the Holy Spirit proceeding from the Father and (in Western Christian theology) from the Son. Regardless of this apparent difference, the three "persons" are each eternal and omnipotent. Other Christian religions including Unitarian Universalism, Jehovah's Witnesses, and Mormonism, do not share those views on the Trinity.

The Greek word trias (Note: The Latin equivalent, from which English trinity is derived, is trinitas though Latin also borrowed Greek trias verbatim.) is first seen in this sense in the works of Theophilus of Antioch; his text reads: "of the Trinity, of God, and of His Word, and of His Wisdom". The term may have been in use before this time; its Latin equivalent, trinitas, appears afterwards with an explicit reference to the Father, the Son, and the Holy Spirit, in Tertullian. In the following century, the word was in general use. It is found in many passages of Origen.

==== Trinitarianism ====
Trinitarianism denotes Christians who believe in the concept of the Trinity. Almost all Christian denominations and churches hold Trinitarian beliefs. Although the words "Trinity" and "Triune" do not appear in the Bible, beginning in the 3rd century theologians developed the term and concept to facilitate apprehension of the New Testament teachings of God as being Father, Son, and Holy Spirit. Since that time, Christian theologians have been careful to emphasize that Trinity does not imply that there are three gods (the antitrinitarian heresy of Tritheism), nor that each hypostasis of the Trinity is one-third of an infinite God (partialism), nor that the Son and the Holy Spirit are beings created by and subordinate to the Father (Arianism). Rather, the Trinity is defined as one God in three persons.

==== Nontrinitarianism ====
Nontrinitarianism (or antitrinitarianism) refers to theology that rejects the doctrine of the Trinity. Various nontrinitarian views, such as adoptionism or modalism, existed in early Christianity, leading to disputes about Christology. Nontrinitarianism reappeared in the Gnosticism of the Cathars between the 11th and 13th centuries, among groups with Unitarian theology in the Protestant Reformation of the 16th century, in the 18th-century Enlightenment, among Restorationist groups arising during the Second Great Awakening of the 19th century, and most recently, in Oneness Pentecostal churches.

=== Eschatology ===
The end of things, whether the end of an individual life, the end of the age, or the end of the world, broadly speaking, is Christian eschatology; the study of the destiny of humans as it is revealed in the Bible. The major issues in Christian eschatology are the Tribulation, death and the afterlife, (mainly for Evangelical groups) the Millennium and the following Rapture, the Second Coming of Jesus, Resurrection of the Dead, Heaven, (for liturgical branches) Purgatory, and Hell, the Last Judgment, the end of the world, and the New Heavens and New Earth.

Christians believe that the second coming of Christ will occur at the end of time, after a period of severe persecution (the Great Tribulation). All who have died will be resurrected bodily from the dead for the Last Judgment. Jesus will fully establish the Kingdom of God in fulfillment of scriptural prophecies.

==== Death and afterlife ====
Most Christians believe that human beings experience divine judgment and are rewarded either with eternal life or eternal damnation. This includes the general judgement at the resurrection of the dead as well as the belief (held by Catholics, Orthodox and most Protestants) in a judgment particular to the individual soul after physical death.

In the Catholic branch of Christianity, those who die in a state of grace, i.e., without any mortal sin separating them from God, but are still imperfectly purified from the effects of sin, undergo purification through the intermediate state of purgatory to achieve the holiness necessary for entrance into God's presence. Those who have attained this goal are called saints (Latin sanctus, "holy").

Some Christian groups, such as Seventh-day Adventists, hold to mortalism, the belief that the human soul is not naturally immortal, and is unconscious during the intermediate state between bodily death and resurrection. These Christians also hold to Annihilationism, the belief that subsequent to the final judgement, the wicked will cease to exist rather than suffer everlasting torment. Jehovah's Witnesses hold to a similar view.

== Practices ==
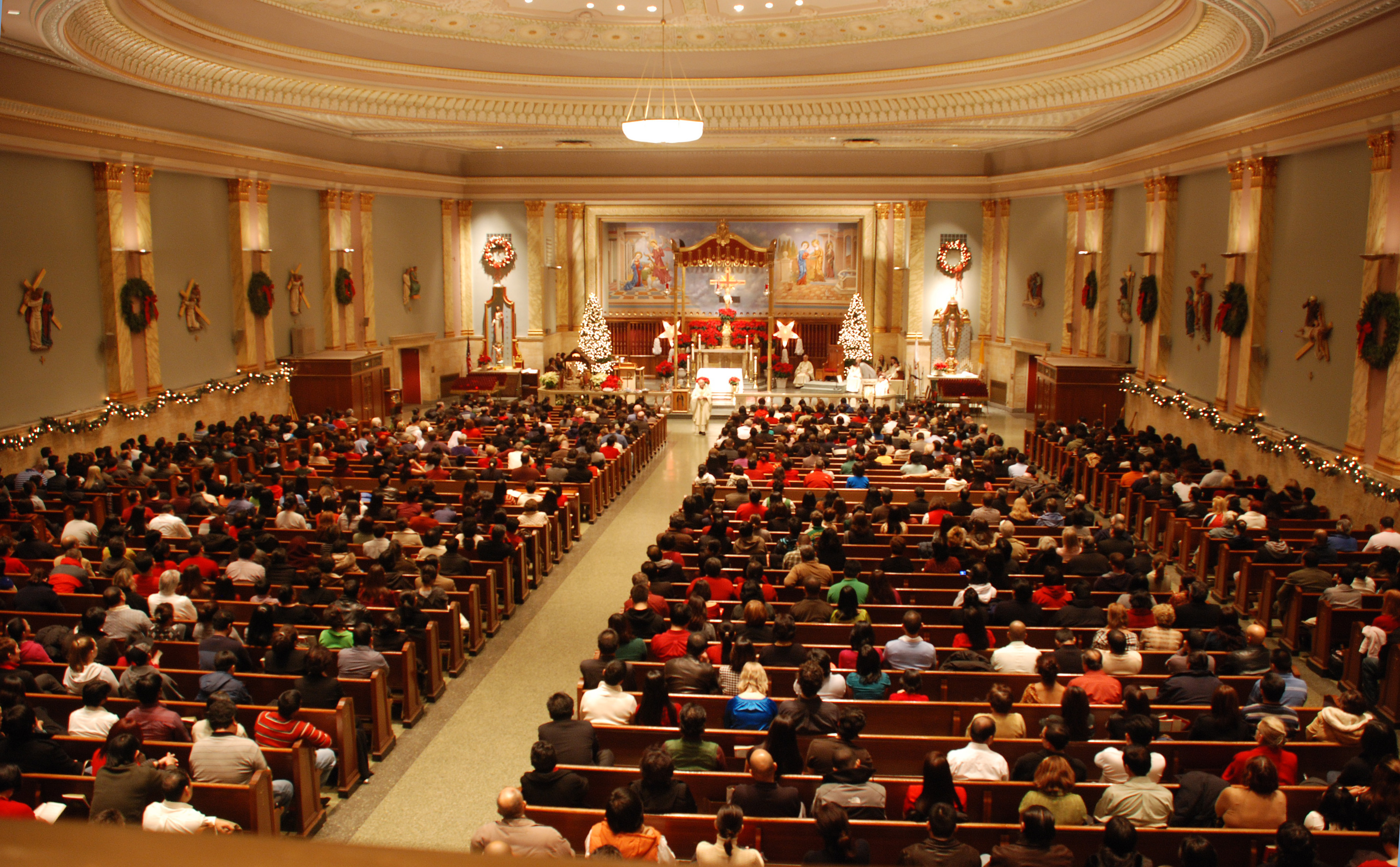
Christmas Eve Midnight Mass at a Catholic parish church in Woodside, New York City, U.S.

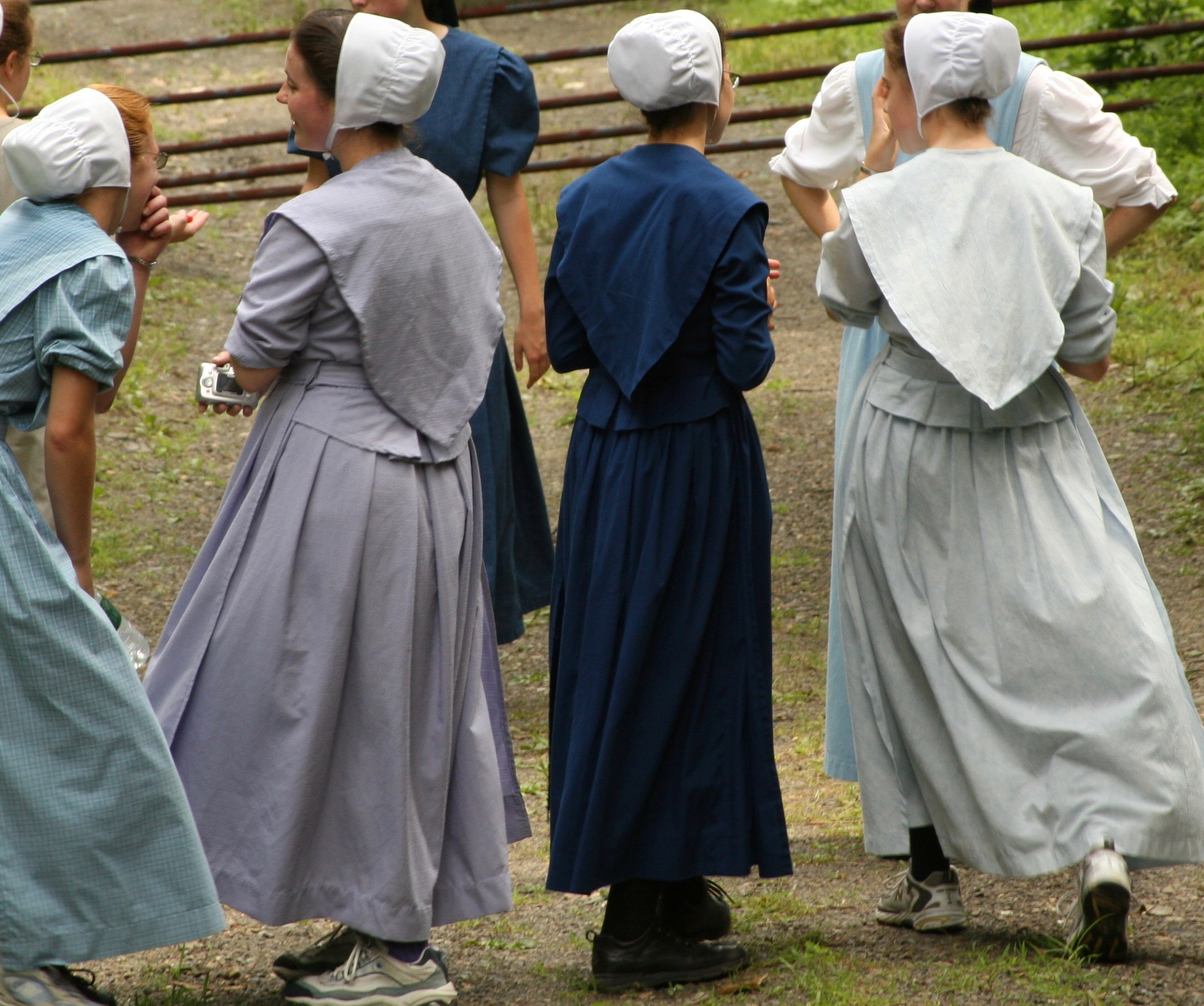
Old Order Anabaptist and Conservative Anabaptist women, for modesty, wear cape dresses and head coverings, the latter of which is taught as a church ordinance.

Depending on the specific denomination of Christianity, practices may include baptism, the Eucharist (Holy Communion or the Lord's Supper), prayer (including the Lord's Prayer), confession, confirmation, burial rites, marriage rites and the religious education of children. Most denominations have ordained clergy who lead regular communal worship services.

Christian rites, rituals, and ceremonies are not celebrated in one single sacred language. Many ritualistic Christian churches make a distinction between sacred language, liturgical language and vernacular language. The three important languages in the early Christian era were: Latin, Greek and Syriac.

=== Communal worship ===
Services of worship typically follow a pattern or form known as liturgy. (Note: Frequently a distinction is made between "liturgical" and "non-liturgical" churches based on how elaborate or antiquated the worship; in this usage, churches whose services are unscripted or improvised are described as "non-liturgical".) Justin Martyr described 2nd-century Christian liturgy in his First Apology (c. 150) to Emperor Antoninus Pius, and his description remains relevant to the basic structure of Christian liturgical worship:

And Sundays, all who live in cities or in the country gather together to one place, and the memoirs of the apostles or the writings of the prophets are read, as long as time permits; then, when the reader has ceased, the president verbally instructs, and exhorts to the imitation of these good things. Then we all rise together and pray, and, as we before said, when our prayer is ended, bread and wine and water are brought, and the president in like manner offers prayers and thanksgivings, according to his ability, and the people assent, saying Amen; and there is a distribution to each, and a participation of that over which thanks have been given, and to those who are absent a portion is sent by the deacons. And they who are well to do, and willing, give what each thinks fit; and what is collected is deposited with the president, who succours the orphans and widows and those who, through sickness or any other cause, are in want, and those who are in bonds and the strangers sojourning among us, and in a word takes care of all who are in need.

Thus, as Justin described, Christians assemble for communal worship typically on Sunday, the Lord's Day, though other liturgical practices often occur outside this setting. Scripture readings are drawn from the Old and New Testaments, but especially the gospels. (Note: Often these are arranged on an annual cycle, using a book called a lectionary.) Instruction is given based on these readings, in the form of a sermon or homily. There are a variety of congregational prayers, including thanksgiving, confession, and intercession, which occur throughout the service and take a variety of forms including recited, responsive, silent, or sung. Psalms, hymns, worship songs, and other church music may be sung. Services can be varied for special events like significant feast days.

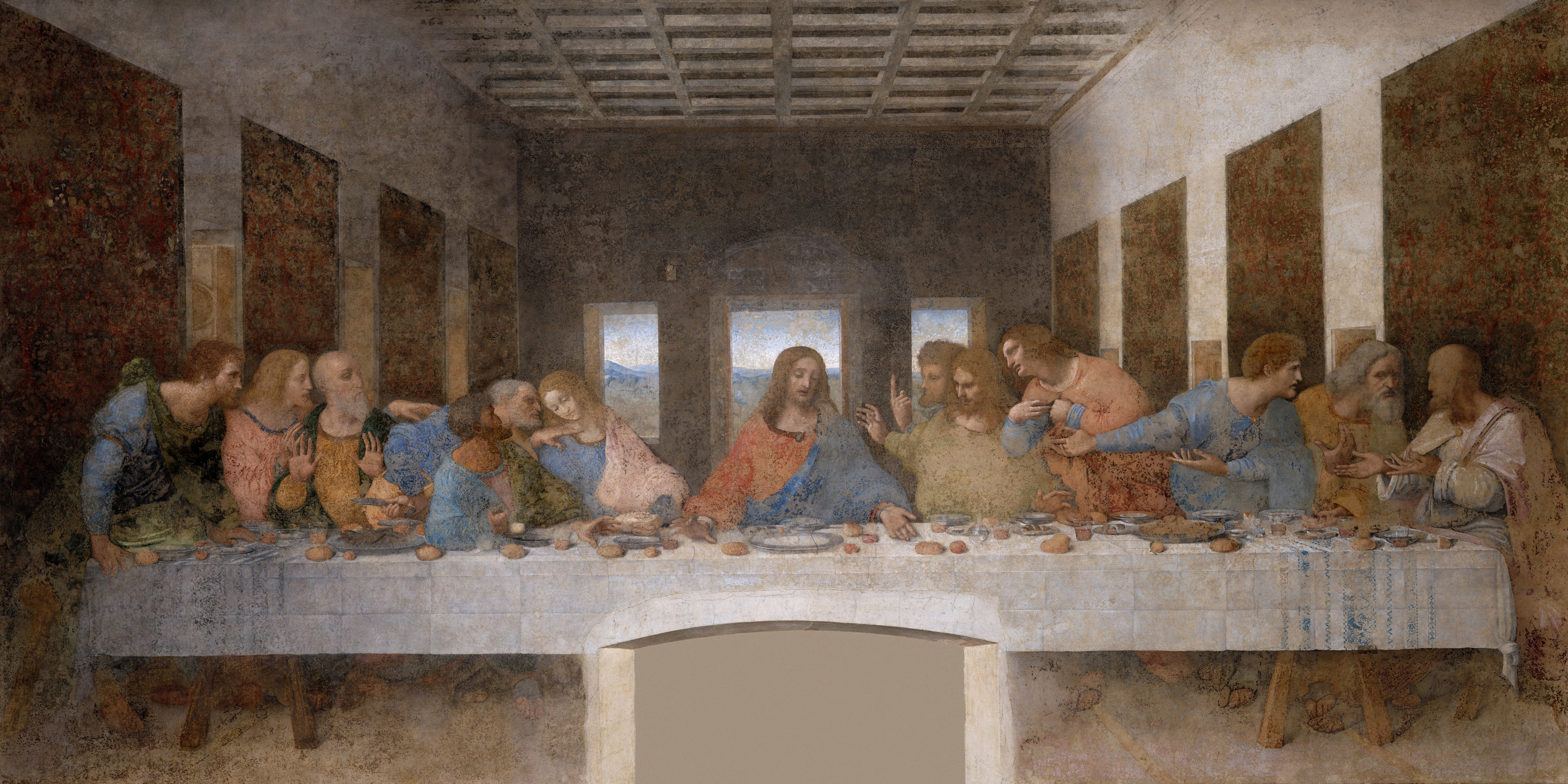
The Last Supper in the Santa Maria delle Grazie Church in Milan, Italy, a late 1490s mural painting by Leonardo da Vinci, depicting the Last Supper of Jesus and his twelve apostles, depicts the final meal of Jesus before his crucifixion and death.

Nearly all forms of worship incorporate the Eucharist, which consists of bread and wine (or a substitute). It is reenacted in accordance with Jesus' instruction at the Last Supper that his followers do in remembrance of him as when he gave his disciples bread, saying, "This is my body", and gave them wine saying, "This is my blood". In the early church, Christians and those yet to complete initiation would separate for the Eucharistic part of the service. Some denominations such as Confessional Lutheran churches continue to practice 'closed communion'. They offer communion to those who are already united in that denomination or sometimes individual church. Catholics further restrict participation to their members who are not in a state of mortal sin. Many other churches, such as the Anglican Communion and the Methodist Churches (such as the Free Methodist Church and United Methodist Church), practice 'open communion' since they view communion as a means to unity, rather than an end, and invite all believing Christians to participate.

=== Sacraments or ordinances ===
2nd-century description of the Eucharist

And this food is called among us Eukharistia [the Eucharist], of which no one is allowed to partake but the man who believes that the things which we teach are true, and who has been washed with the washing that is for the remission of sins, and unto regeneration, and who is so living as Christ has enjoined. For not as common bread and common drink do we receive these; but in like manner as Jesus Christ our Savior, having been made flesh by the Word of God, had both flesh and blood for our salvation, so likewise have we been taught that the food which is blessed by the prayer of His word, and from which our blood and flesh by transmutation are nourished, is the flesh and blood of that Jesus who was made flesh.

— Justin Martyr

In Christian belief and practice, a sacrament is a rite, instituted by Christ, that confers grace, constituting a sacred mystery. The term is derived from the Latin word sacramentum, which was used to translate the Greek word for mystery. Views concerning both which rites are sacramental, and what it means for an act to be a sacrament, vary among Christian denominations and traditions.

The most conventional functional definition of a sacrament is that it is an outward sign, instituted by Christ, that conveys an inward, spiritual grace through Christ. The two most widely accepted sacraments are Baptism and the Eucharist; however, the majority of Christians also recognize five additional sacraments: Confirmation (Chrismation in the Eastern tradition), Holy Orders (or ordination), Penance (or Confession), Anointing of the Sick, and Matrimony (see Christian views on marriage).

Taken together, these are the Seven Sacraments as recognized by churches in the High Church tradition—notably Catholic, Eastern Orthodox, Oriental Orthodox, Independent Catholic, Old Catholic, some Lutherans and Anglicans. Most other denominations and traditions typically affirm only Baptism and Eucharist as sacraments, while some Protestant groups, such as the Quakers, reject sacramental theology. Certain denominations of Christianity, such as Anabaptists, use the term "ordinances" to refer to rites instituted by Jesus for Christians to observe. Seven ordinances have been taught in many Conservative Mennonite Anabaptist churches, which include "baptism, communion, footwashing, marriage, anointing with oil, the holy kiss, and the prayer covering".

In addition to this, the Church of the East has two additional sacraments in place of the traditional sacraments of Matrimony and the Anointing of the Sick. These include Holy Leaven (Melka) and the sign of the cross. The Schwarzenau Brethren Anabaptist churches, such as the Dunkard Brethren Church, observe the agape feast (lovefeast), a rite also observed by Moravian Church and Methodist Churches.

=== Liturgical calendar ===
Catholics, Eastern Christians, Lutherans, Anglicans and other traditional Protestant communities frame worship around the liturgical year. The liturgical cycle divides the year into a series of seasons, each with their theological emphases, and modes of prayer, which can be signified by different ways of decorating churches, colors of paraments and vestments for clergy, scriptural readings, themes for preaching and even different traditions and practices often observed personally or in the home.

Western Christian liturgical calendars are based on the cycle of the Roman Rite of the Catholic Church, and Eastern Christians use analogous calendars based on the cycle of their respective rites. Calendars set aside holy days, such as solemnities which commemorate an event in the life of Jesus, Mary, or the saints, and periods of fasting, such as Lent and other pious events such as memoria, or lesser festivals commemorating saints. Christian groups that do not follow a liturgical tradition often retain certain celebrations, such as Christmas, Easter, and Pentecost: these are the celebrations of Christ's birth, resurrection, and the descent of the Holy Spirit upon the Church, respectively. A few denominations such as Quaker Christians make no use of a liturgical calendar.

=== Symbols ===
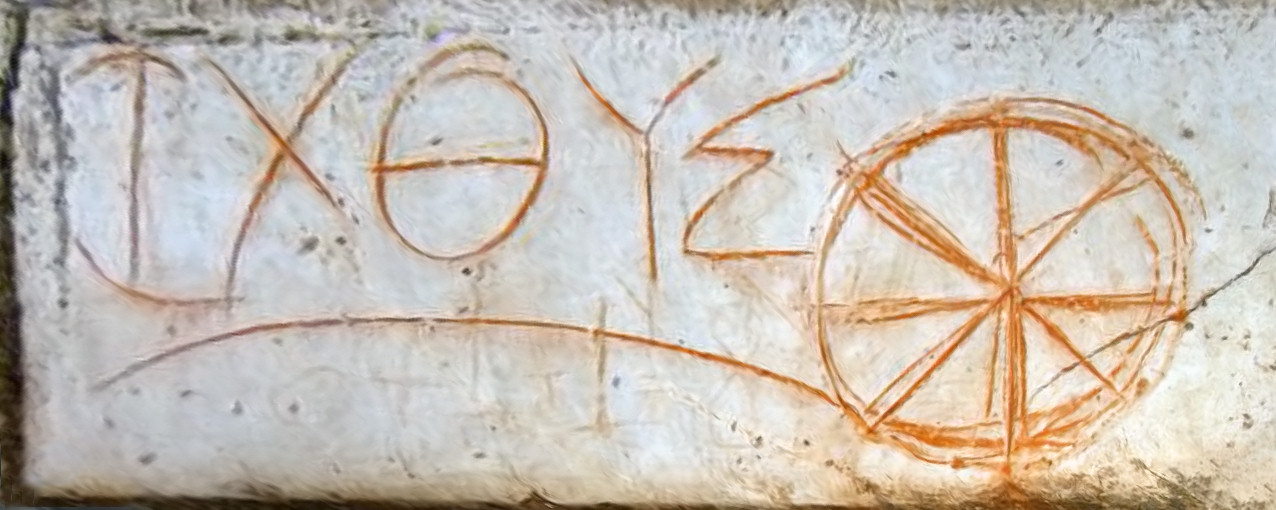
An early circular ichthys symbol, created by combining the Greek letters ΙΧΘΥΣ into a wheel, Ephesus, Asia Minor

Most Christian denominations have not generally practiced aniconism, the avoidance or prohibition of devotional images, even if early Jewish Christians, invoking the Decalogue's prohibition of idolatry, avoided figures in their symbols.

The cross, today one of the most widely recognized symbols, was used by Christians from the earliest times. Tertullian, in his book De Corona, tells how it was already a tradition for Christians to trace the sign of the cross on their foreheads. Although the cross was known to the early Christians, the crucifix did not appear in use until the 5th century.

Among the earliest Christian symbols, that of the fish or Ichthys seems to have ranked first in importance, as seen on monumental sources such as tombs from the first decades of the 2nd century. Its popularity seemingly arose from the Greek word ichthys (fish) forming an acrostic for the Greek phrase Iesous Christos Theou Yios Soter (Ἰησοῦς Χριστός, Θεοῦ Υἱός, Σωτήρ), (Note: Iesous Christos Theou Hyios Soter may be a more complete transliteration; in Koine Greek, the daseia or spiritus asper had largely ceased being pronounced and was not—commonly—marked in the majuscule script of the time.) (Jesus Christ, Son of God, Savior), a concise summary of Christian faith.

Other major Christian symbols include the chi-rho monogram, the dove and olive branch (symbolic of the Holy Spirit), the sacrificial lamb (representing Christ's sacrifice), the vine (symbolizing the connection of the Christian with Christ) and many others. These all derive from passages of the New Testament.

=== Baptism ===
Infant baptism by effusion in a Catholic Church in Venezuela

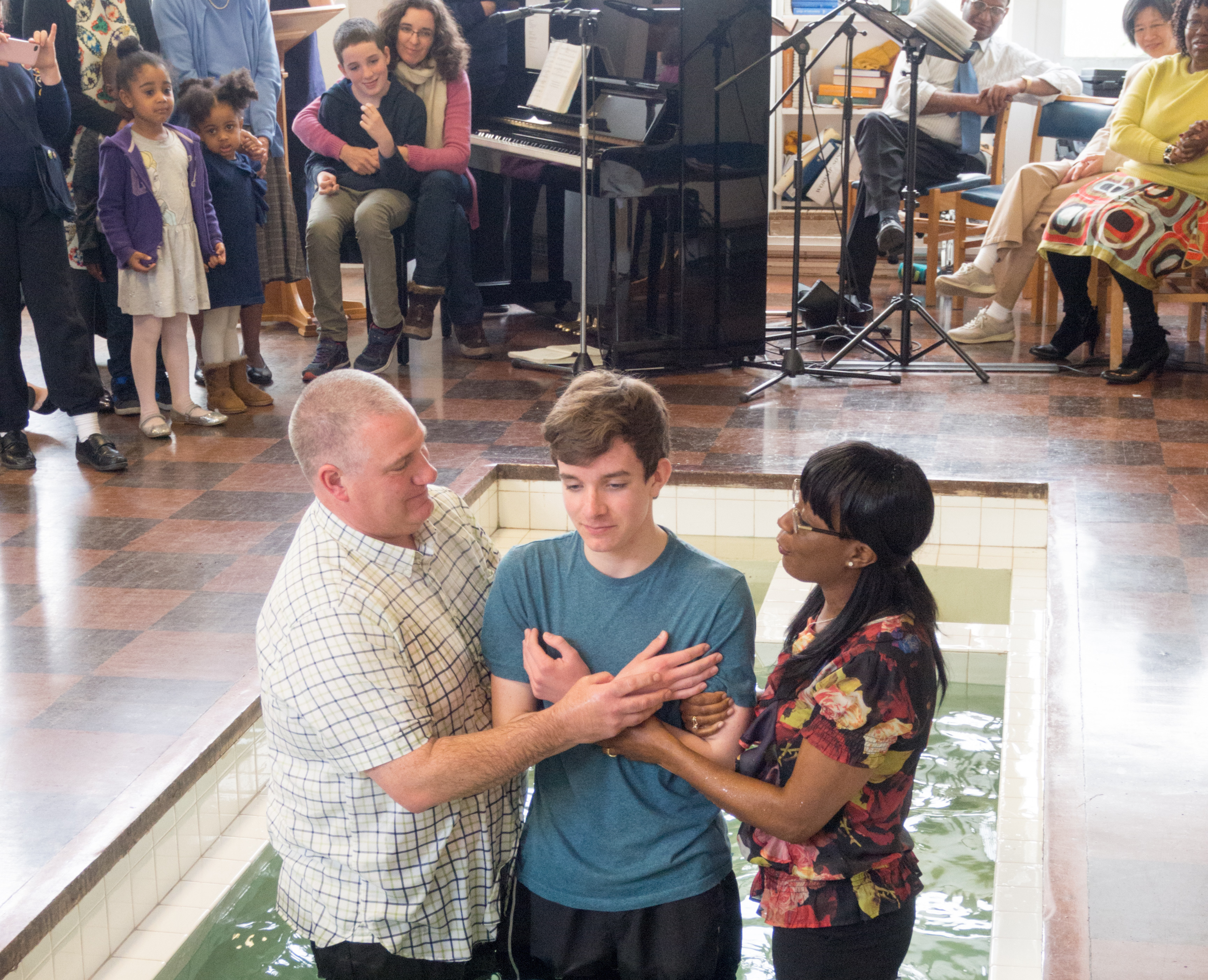
Believer's baptism of adult by immersion, Northolt Park Baptist Church, in Greater London, Baptist Union of Great Britain

Baptism is the ritual act, with the use of water, by which a person is admitted to membership of the Church. Beliefs on baptism vary among denominations. Differences occur firstly on whether the act has any spiritual significance. Some, such as the Catholic and Eastern Orthodox churches, as well as Lutherans and Anglicans, hold to the doctrine of baptismal regeneration, which affirms that baptism creates or strengthens a person's faith, and is intimately linked to salvation. Baptists and Plymouth Brethren view baptism as a purely symbolic act, an external public declaration of the inward change which has taken place in the person, but not as spiritually efficacious. Secondly, there are differences of opinion on the methodology (or mode) of the act. These modes are: by immersion; if immersion is total, by submersion; by affusion (pouring); and by aspersion (sprinkling). Those who hold the first view may also adhere to the tradition of infant baptism; the Orthodox Churches all practice infant baptism and always baptize by total immersion repeated three times in the name of the Father, the Son, and the Holy Spirit. The Lutheran Church and the Catholic Church also practice infant baptism, usually by affusion, and using the Trinitarian formula. Anabaptist Christians practice believer's baptism, in which an adult chooses to receive the ordinance after making a decision to follow Jesus. Anabaptist denominations such as the Mennonites, Amish and Hutterites use pouring as the mode to administer believer's baptism, whereas Anabaptists of the Schwarzenau Brethren and River Brethren traditions baptize by immersion.

=== Prayer ===
"... 'Our Father in heaven, hallowed be your name. Your kingdom come. Your will be done on earth as it is in heaven. Give us today our daily bread. Forgive us our debts, as we also forgive our debtors. Lead us not into temptation, but deliver us from evil'".

— The Lord's Prayer, Matthew 6:9–13, EHV

In the Gospel of Saint Matthew, Jesus taught the Lord's Prayer, which has been seen as a model for Christian prayer. The injunction for Christians to pray the Lord's prayer thrice daily was given in the Didache and came to be recited by Christians at 9 am, 12 pm, and 3 pm.

In the second century Apostolic Tradition, Hippolytus instructed Christians to pray at seven fixed prayer times: "on rising, at the lighting of the evening lamp, at bedtime, at midnight" and "the third, sixth and ninth hours of the day, being hours associated with Christ's Passion". Prayer positions, including kneeling, standing, and prostrations have been used for these seven fixed prayer times since the days of the early Church. Breviaries such as the Shehimo and Agpeya are used by Oriental Orthodox Christians to pray these canonical hours while facing in the eastward direction of prayer.

The Apostolic Tradition directed that the sign of the cross be used by Christians during the minor exorcism of baptism, during ablutions before praying at fixed prayer times, and in times of temptation.

Intercessory prayer is prayer offered for the benefit of other people. There are many intercessory prayers recorded in the Bible, including prayers of the Apostle Peter on behalf of sick persons and by prophets of the Old Testament in favor of other people. In the Epistle of James, no distinction is made between the intercessory prayer offered by ordinary believers and the prominent Old Testament prophet Elijah. The effectiveness of prayer in Christianity derives from the power of God rather than the status of the one praying.

The ancient church, in both Eastern and Western Christianity, developed a tradition of asking for the intercession of (deceased) saints, and this remains the practice of most Eastern Orthodox, Oriental Orthodox, Catholic, and some Lutheran and Anglican churches. Apart from certain sectors within the latter two denominations, other Churches of the Protestant Reformation, however, rejected prayer to the saints, largely on the basis of the sole mediatorship of Christ. The reformer Huldrych Zwingli admitted that he had offered prayers to the saints until his reading of the Bible convinced him that this was idolatrous.

According to the Catechism of the Catholic Church: "Prayer is the raising of one's mind and heart to God or the requesting of good things from God". The Book of Common Prayer in the Anglican tradition is a guide which provides a set order for services, containing set prayers, scripture readings, and hymns or sung Psalms. Frequently in Western Christianity, when praying, the hands are placed palms together and forward as in the feudal commendation ceremony. At other times the older orans posture may be used, with palms up and elbows in.

=== Marriage ===
Most Christian churches in the world only support marriage between a man and a woman.

Some Christian churches allow local churches to decide about blessings of same-sex marriage.

Some international networks of Affirming churches support blessings of same-sex marriage, such the Association of Welcoming and Affirming Baptists, Ecumenical Catholic Church, Metropolitan Community Church, Reconciling Ministries Network (Methodist), The Covenant Network (Pentecostal).

== Scriptures ==
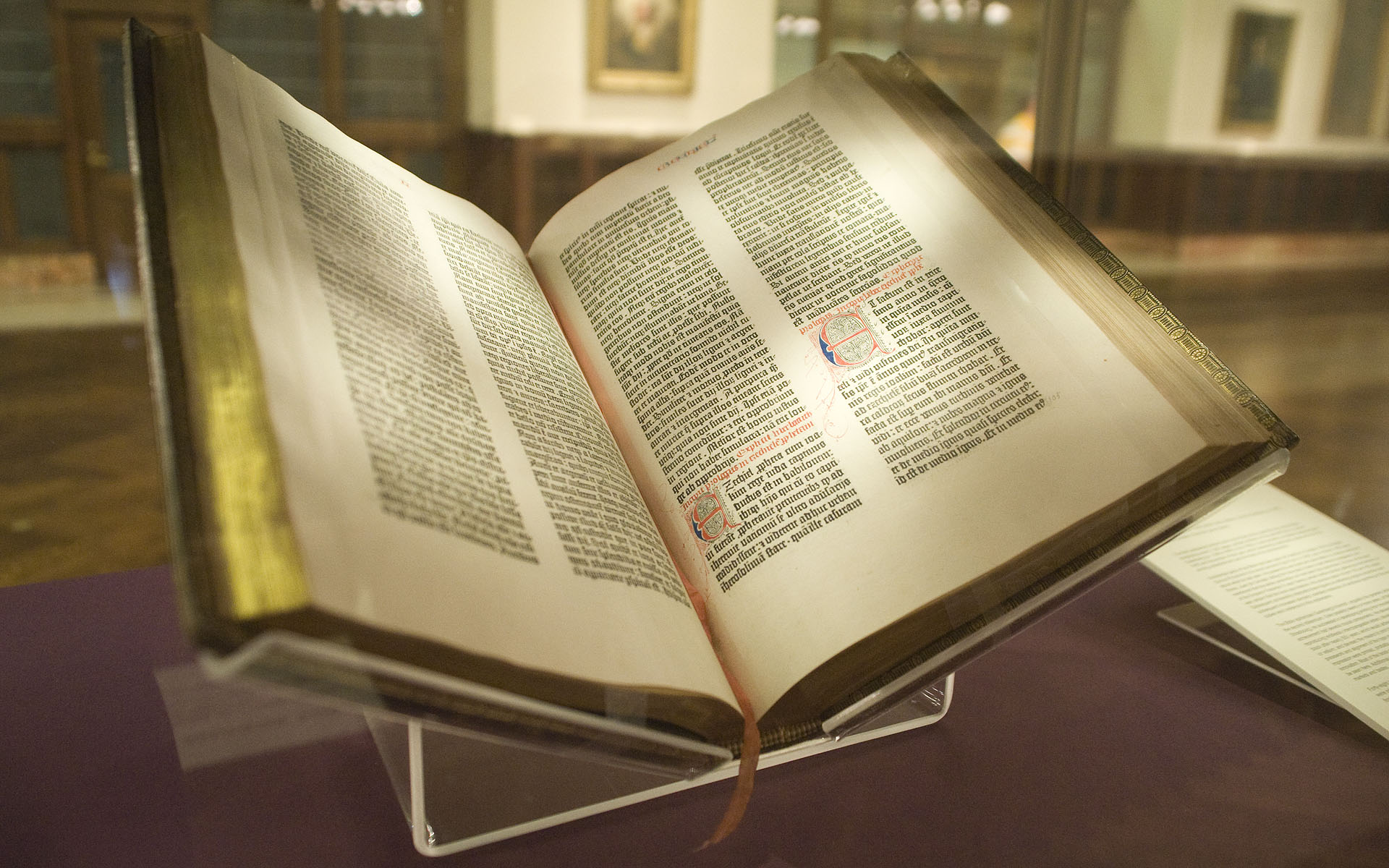
The Bible is the sacred book in Christianity.

Christianity, like other religions, has adherents whose beliefs and biblical interpretations vary. Christianity regards the biblical canon, the Old Testament and the New Testament, as the inspired word of God. The traditional view of inspiration is that God worked through human authors so that what they produced was what God wished to communicate. The Greek word referring to inspiration in 2 Timothy 3:16 is theopneustos, which literally means "God-breathed".

Some believe that divine inspiration makes present Bibles inerrant, while others claim inerrancy for the Bible in its original manuscripts, although none of those are extant. Another closely related view is biblical infallibility or limited inerrancy, which affirms that the Bible is free of error as a guide to salvation, but may include errors on matters such as history, geography, or science.

The canon of the Old Testament accepted by Protestant churches, which is only the Tanakh (the canon of the Hebrew Bible), is shorter than that accepted by the Orthodox and Catholic churches which also include the deuterocanonical books which appear in the Septuagint, the Orthodox canon being slightly larger than the Catholic; Protestants regard the latter as apocryphal, important historical documents which help to inform the understanding of words, grammar, and syntax used in the historical period of their conception. Some versions of the Bible include a separate Apocrypha section between the Old Testament and the New Testament. The New Testament, originally written in Koine Greek, contains 27 books which are agreed upon by all major churches.

Some denominations have additional canonical holy scriptures beyond the Bible, including the standard works of the Latter Day Saints movement and Divine Principle in the Unification Church.

=== Catholic interpretation ===
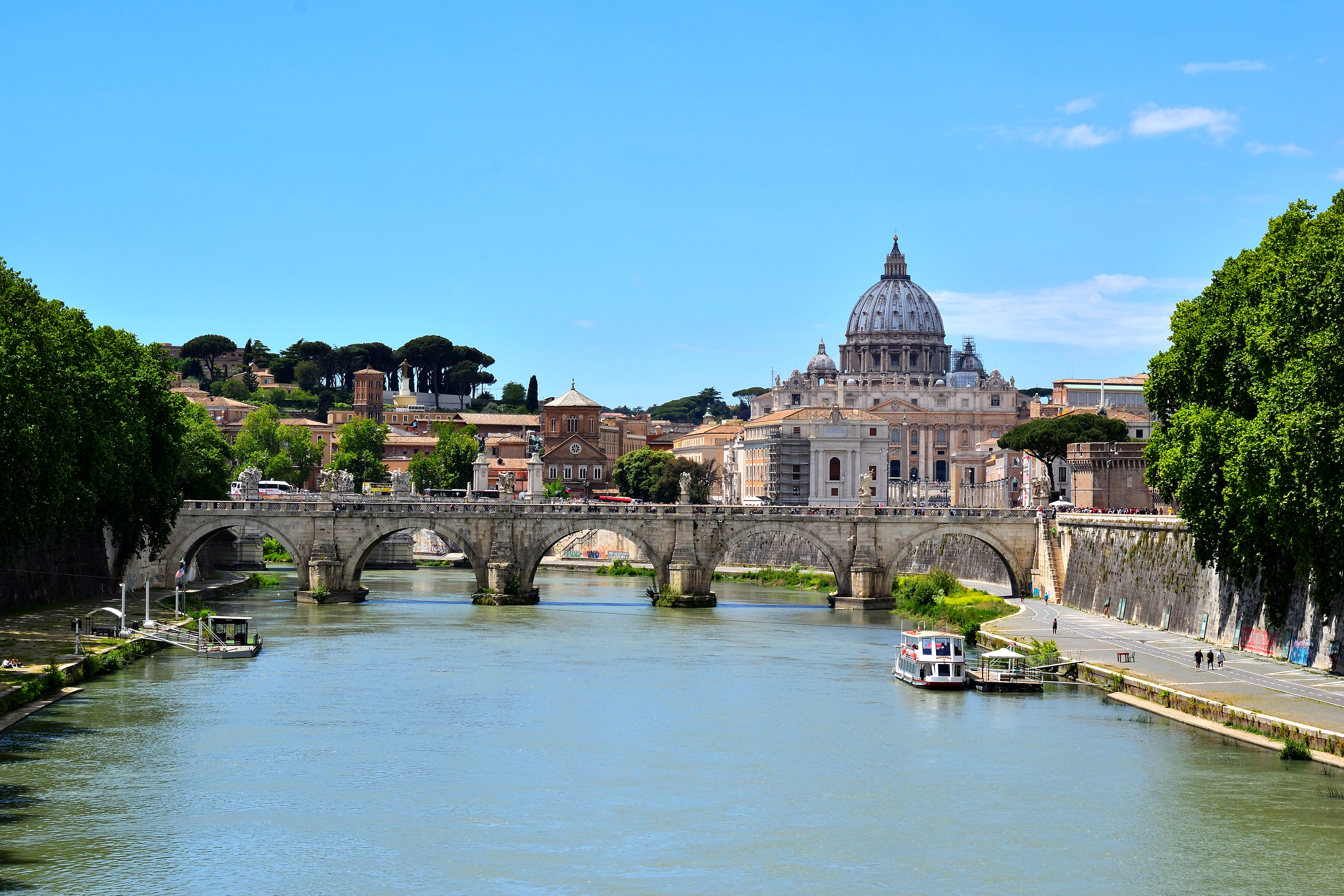
St. Peter's Basilica viewed from the Tiber; the Vatican Hill in the back and Castel Sant'Angelo in Rome to the right. Both the basilica and the hill are part of the sovereign state of Vatican City, the Holy See of the Catholic Church.

In antiquity, two schools of exegesis developed in Alexandria and Antioch. The Alexandrian interpretation, exemplified by Origen, tended to read Scripture allegorically, while the Antiochene interpretation adhered to the literal sense, holding that other meanings (called theoria) could only be accepted if based on the literal meaning.

Catholic theology distinguishes two senses of scripture: the literal and the spiritual.

The literal sense of understanding scripture is the meaning conveyed by the words of Scripture. The spiritual sense is further subdivided into:

- The allegorical sense, which includes typology. An example would be the parting of the Red Sea being understood as a "type" (sign) of baptism.
- The moral sense, which understands the scripture to contain some ethical teaching.
- The anagogical sense, which applies to eschatology, eternity and the consummation of the world.

Regarding exegesis, following the rules of sound interpretation, Catholic theology holds:

- The injunction that all other senses of sacred scripture are based on the literal
- That the historicity of the Gospels must be absolutely and constantly held
- That scripture must be read within the "living Tradition of the whole Church" and
- That "the task of interpretation has been entrusted to the bishops in communion with the successor of Peter, the Bishop of Rome".

=== Protestant interpretation ===
==== Qualities of Scripture ====
Many Protestant Christians, such as Lutherans and the Reformed, believe in the doctrine of sola scriptura—that the Bible is a self-sufficient revelation, the final authority on all Christian doctrine, and revealed all truth necessary for salvation; other Protestant Christians, such as Methodists and Anglicans, affirm the doctrine of prima scriptura which teaches that Scripture is the primary source for Christian doctrine, but that "tradition, experience, and reason" can nurture the Christian religion as long as they are in harmony with the Bible. Protestants characteristically believe that ordinary believers may reach an adequate understanding of Scripture because Scripture itself is clear in its meaning (or "perspicuous"). Martin Luther believed that without God's help, Scripture would be "enveloped in darkness". He advocated for "one definite and simple understanding of Scripture". John Calvin wrote, "all who refuse not to follow the Holy Spirit as their guide, find in the Scripture a clear light". Related to this is "efficacy", that Scripture is able to lead people to faith; and "sufficiency", that the Scriptures contain everything that one needs to know to obtain salvation and to live a Christian life.

==== Original intended meaning of Scripture ====
Protestants stress the meaning conveyed by the words of Scripture, the historical-grammatical method. The historical-grammatical method or grammatico-historical method is an effort in Biblical hermeneutics to find the intended original meaning in the text. This original intended meaning of the text is drawn out through examination of the passage in light of the grammatical and syntactical aspects, the historical background, the literary genre, as well as theological (canonical) considerations. The historical-grammatical method distinguishes between the one original meaning and the significance of the text. The significance of the text includes the ensuing use of the text or application. The original passage is seen as having only a single meaning or sense. As Milton S. Terry said: "A fundamental principle in grammatico-historical exposition is that the words and sentences can have but one significance in one and the same connection. The moment we neglect this principle we drift out upon a sea of uncertainty and conjecture". Technically speaking, the grammatical-historical method of interpretation is distinct from the determination of the passage's significance in light of that interpretation. Taken together, both define the term (Biblical) hermeneutics. Some Protestant interpreters make use of typology.

== Demographics ==
Global percentage of adherents by religion. Christians are the world's largest religious group, with about 2.3 billion adherents in 2020, with about 28.8% of the world's population.

With around 2.3 billion adherents according to a 2020 estimation by Pew Research Center, split into three main branches of Catholic, Protestant, and Eastern Orthodox, Christianity is the world's largest religion. High birth rates and conversions in the global South were cited as the reasons for the Christian population growth. For the last hundred years, the Christian share has stood at around 33% of the world population. This masks a major shift in the demographics of Christianity; large increases in the developing world have been accompanied by substantial declines in the developed world, mainly in Western Europe and North America. Based on the 2020 population estimate, Christians comprise 28.8% of the world's population. 46.8% of the Christian population is concentrated in 10 countries: United States (over 210 million), Brazil (over 160 million), Mexico (over 110 million), Philippines and Russia (each one over 100 million), Nigeria and Congo (each one over 90 million), Ethiopia (over 70 million), South Africa (over 50 million) and Italy (over 40 million).

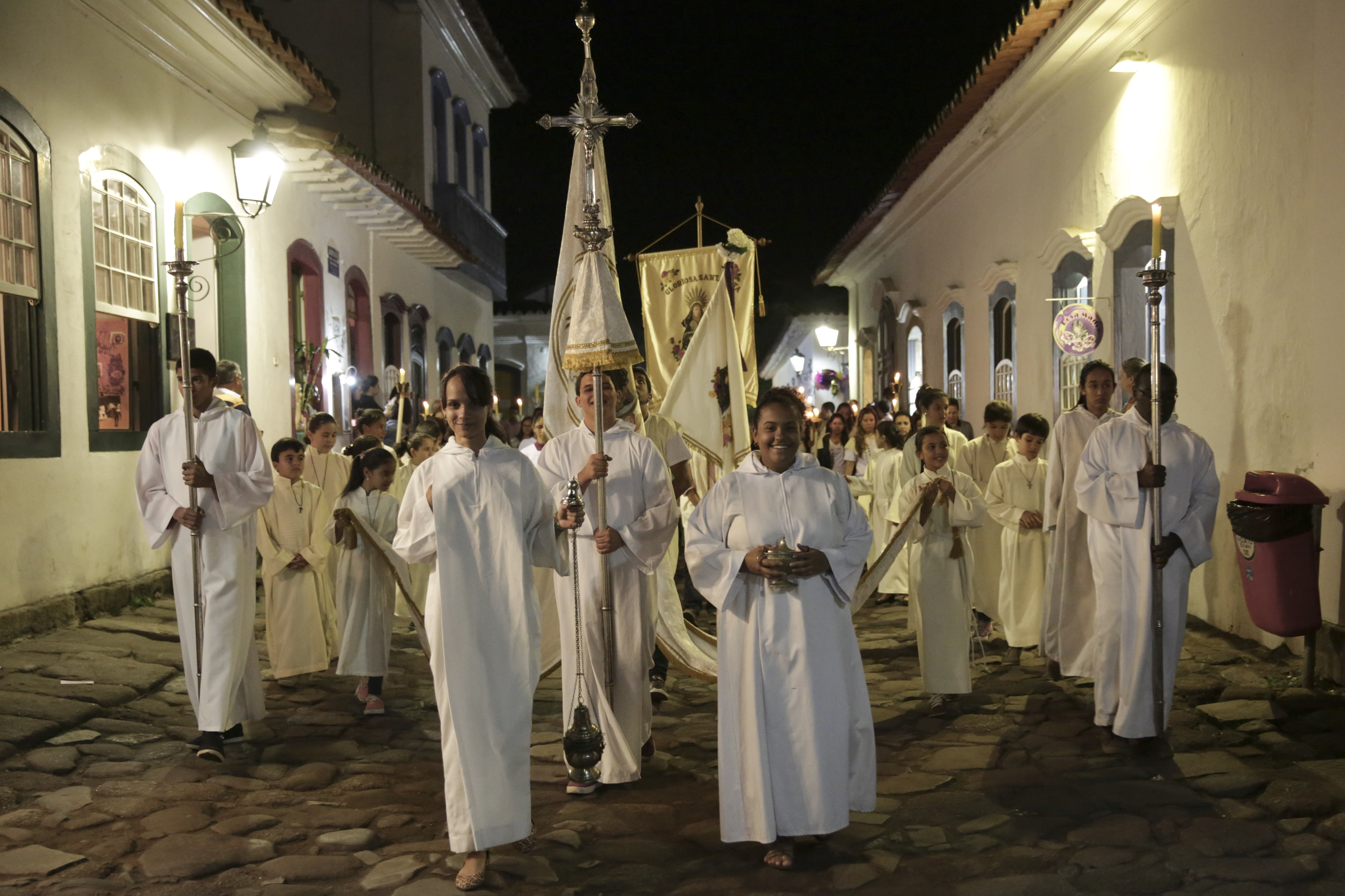
A Christian procession in Brazil, the country with the largest Catholic population in the world

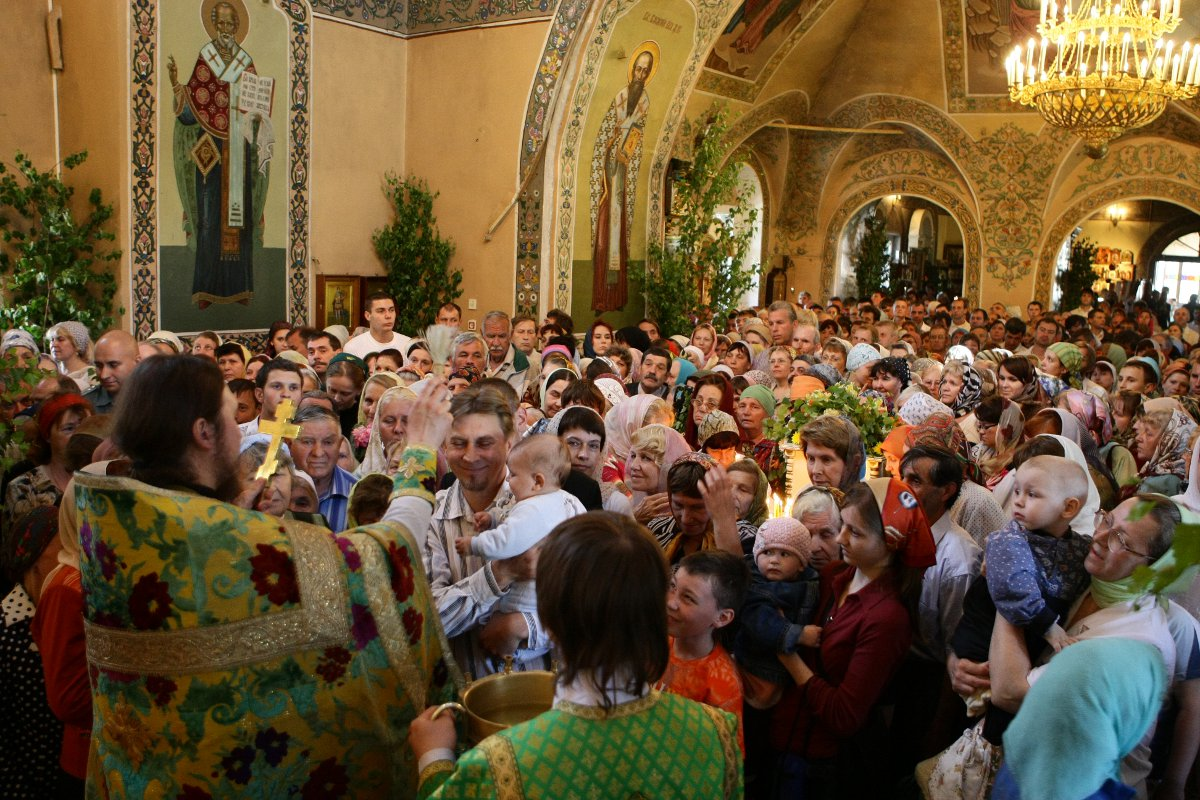
Trinity Sunday in Russia; the Russian Orthodox Church has experienced a great revival since the dissolution of the Soviet Union, a country that had a policy of state atheism.

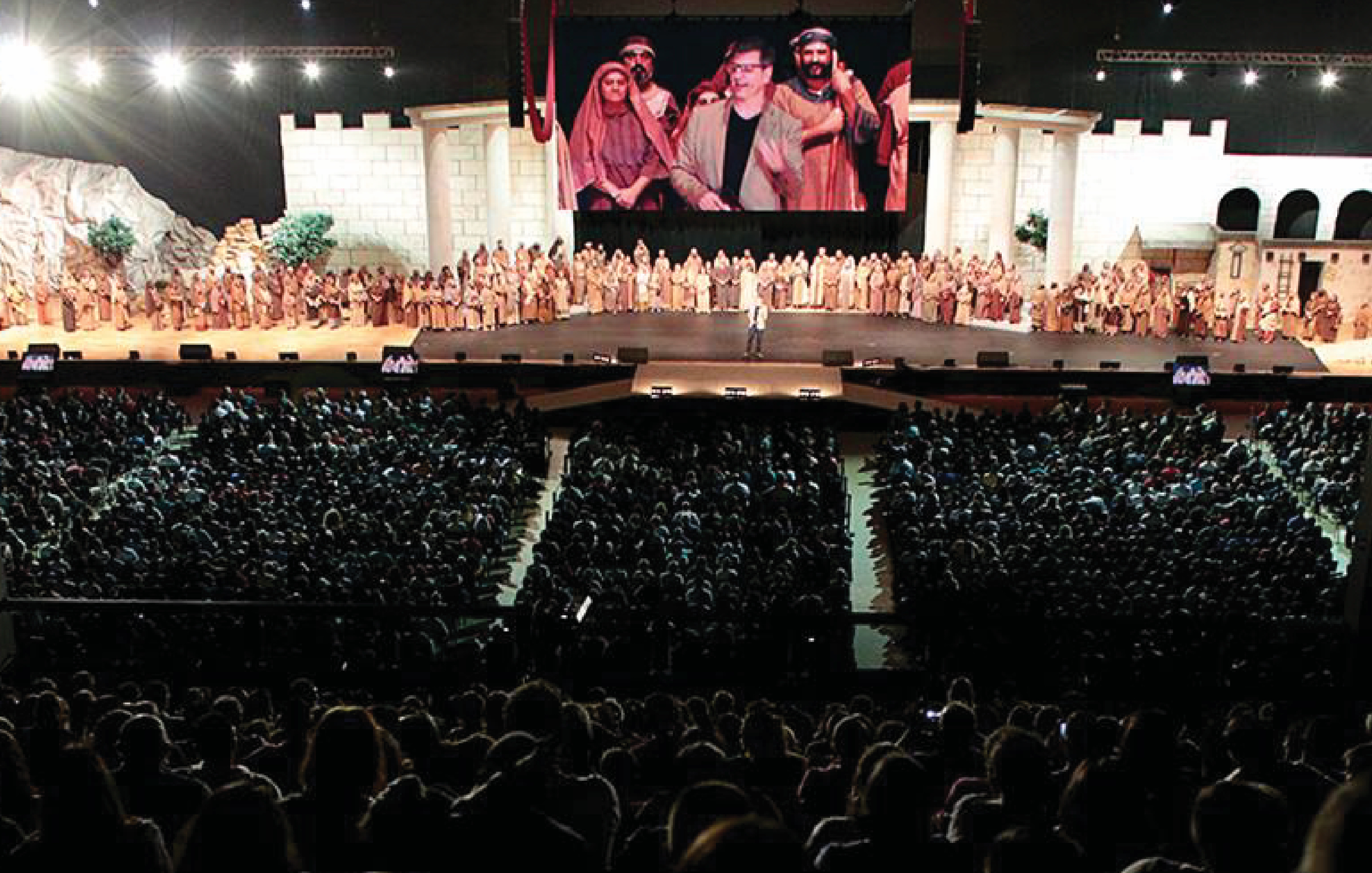
Show on the life of Jesus at City Church in São José dos Campos, affiliated with the Brazilian Baptist Convention

Based on a 2015 Pew Research Center study, within the next four decades, Christianity will remain the largest religion; and by 2050, the Christian population is expected to exceed 3 billion. According to some scholars, Christianity ranks at first place in net gains through religious conversion. As a percentage of Christians, the Catholic Church and Orthodoxy (both Eastern and Oriental) are declining in some parts of the world (though Catholicism is growing in Asia, in Africa, vibrant in Eastern Europe, etc.), while Protestants and other Christians are on the rise in the developing world. The so-called popular Protestantism (Note: A flexible term, defined as all forms of Protestantism with the notable exception of the historical denominations deriving directly from the Protestant Reformation.) is one of the fastest growing religious categories in the world. Nevertheless, Catholicism will also continue to grow to 1.63 billion by 2050, according to Todd Johnson of the Center for the Study of Global Christianity. Africa alone, by 2015, will be home to 230 million African Catholics. According to Pew Research Center, Africa is expected to be home to 1.1 billion African Christians by 2050.

In 2010, 87% of the world's Christian population lived in countries where Christians are in the majority, while 13% of the world's Christian population lived in countries where Christians are in the minority. Christianity is the predominant religion in Europe, the Americas, Oceania, and Sub-Saharan Africa. There are also large Christian communities in other parts of the world, such as Central Asia, the Middle East and North Africa, East Asia, Southeast Asia, and the Indian subcontinent. In Asia, it is the dominant religion in Armenia, Cyprus, Georgia, East Timor, and the Philippines. However, it is declining in some areas including the northern and western United States, some areas in Oceania (Australia and New Zealand), northern Europe (including Great Britain, Scandinavia and other places), France, Germany, Canada, and some parts of Asia (especially the Middle East, due to the Christian emigration, and Macau).

The total Christian population is not decreasing in Brazil and the southern United States, however, the percentage of the population identifying as Christian is in decline. Since the fall of communism, the proportion of Christians has been largely stable in Central Europe, except in the Czech Republic. On the other hand, Christianity is growing rapidly in both numbers and percentages in Eastern Europe, China, other Asian countries, Sub-Saharan Africa, Latin America, North Africa (Maghreb), Gulf Cooperation Council countries, Muslim world, and Oceania.

Despite a decline in adherence in the West, Christianity remains the dominant religion in the region, with about 70% of that population identifying as Christian. Christianity remains the largest religion in Western Europe, where 71% of Western Europeans identified themselves as Christian in 2018. A 2011 Pew Research Center survey found that 76% of Europeans, 73% in Oceania and about 86% in the Americas (90% in Latin America and 77% in North America) identified themselves as Christians. By 2020, 120 countries and territories in the world had Christian majorities.

There are many charismatic movements that have become well established over large parts of the world, especially Africa, Latin America, and Asia. Since 1900, primarily due to conversion, Protestantism has spread rapidly in Africa, Asia, Oceania, and Latin America. From 1960 to 2000, the global growth of the number of reported Evangelical Protestants grew three times the world's population rate, and twice that of Islam. According to the historian Geoffrey Blainey from the University of Melbourne, since the 1960s there has been a substantial increase in the number of conversions from Islam to Christianity, mostly to the Evangelical and Pentecostal forms. Significant numbers of Muslim converts to Christianity can be found in Afghanistan, Azerbaijan, Central Asia (including Kazakhstan, Kyrgyzstan, and other countries), Indonesia, Malaysia, the Middle East (including Iran, Saudi Arabia, Turkey, and other countries), North Africa (including Algeria, Morocco, and Tunisia), Sub-Saharan Africa, and the Western World (including Albania, Belgium, France, Germany, Kosovo, the Netherlands, Russia, Scandinavia, United Kingdom, the United States, and other western countries). It is also reported that Christianity is popular among people of different backgrounds in Africa and Asia; according to a report by the Singapore Management University, more people in Southeast Asia are converting to Christianity, many of them young and having a university degree. According to scholar Juliette Koning and Heidi Dahles of Vrije Universiteit Amsterdam there is a "rapid expansion" of Christianity in Singapore, China, Hong Kong, Taiwan, Indonesia, Malaysia, and South Korea. According to scholar Terence Chong from the Institute of Southeast Asian Studies, since the 1980s Christianity is expanding in China, Singapore, Indonesia, Japan, Malaysia, Taiwan, South Korea, and Vietnam.

In most countries in the developed world, church attendance among people who continue to identify themselves as Christians has been falling over the last few decades. Some sources view this as part of a drift away from traditional membership institutions, while others link it to signs of a decline in belief in the importance of religion in general. Europe's Christian population, though in decline, still constitutes the largest geographical component of the religion. According to data from the 2012 European Social Survey, around a third of European Christians say they attend services once a month or more. Conversely, according to the World Values Survey, about more than two-thirds of Latin American Christians, and about 90% of African Christians (in Ghana, Nigeria, Rwanda, South Africa and Zimbabwe) said they attended church regularly. According to a 2018 study by the Pew Research Center, Christians in Africa and Latin America and the United States have high levels of commitment to their faith.

Christianity, in one form or another, is the sole state religion of the following nations: Argentina (Catholic), Costa Rica (Catholic), the Kingdom of Denmark (Lutheran), England (Anglican), Greece (Greek Orthodox), Iceland (Lutheran), Liechtenstein (Catholic), Malta (Catholic), Monaco (Catholic), Norway (Lutheran), Samoa, Tonga (Methodist), Tuvalu (Reformed), and Vatican City (Catholic).

There are numerous other countries, such as Cyprus, which although do not have an established church, still give official recognition and support to a specific Christian denomination.

The global distribution of Christians: Countries colored a darker shade have a higher proportion of Christians.

Countries with 50% or more Christians are colored purple; countries with 10% to 50% Christians are colored pink.

Nations with Christianity as their state religion are in blue.

Distribution of Catholics

Distribution of Protestants

Distribution of Eastern Orthodox

Distribution of Oriental Orthodox

Distribution of other Christians

== Churches and denominations ==
World Christianity by tradition in 2024 as per World Christian Database
1. Catholic (48.6%)
2. Protestant (39.8%)
3. Orthodox (11.1%)
4. Other (0.50%)

Christianity can be taxonomically divided into three main groups: Catholicism, Protestantism, Eastern Orthodoxy while other groups include Oriental Orthodoxy, Restorationism and Church of the East. A broader distinction that is sometimes drawn is between Eastern Christianity and Western Christianity, which has its origins in the East–West Schism (Great Schism) of the 11th century. Recently, neither Western nor Eastern World Christianity has also stood out, for example, in African-initiated churches. However, there are other present and historical Christian groups that do not fit neatly into one of these primary categories.

There is a diversity of doctrines and liturgical practices among groups calling themselves Christian. These groups may vary ecclesiologically in their views on a classification of Christian denominations. The Nicene Creed (325), however, is typically accepted as authoritative by most Christians, including the Catholic, Eastern Orthodox, Oriental Orthodox, and major Protestant, such as Lutheran and Anglican denominations.

(Not shown are ante-Nicene, nontrinitarian, and restorationist denominations.)

=== Catholic Church ===
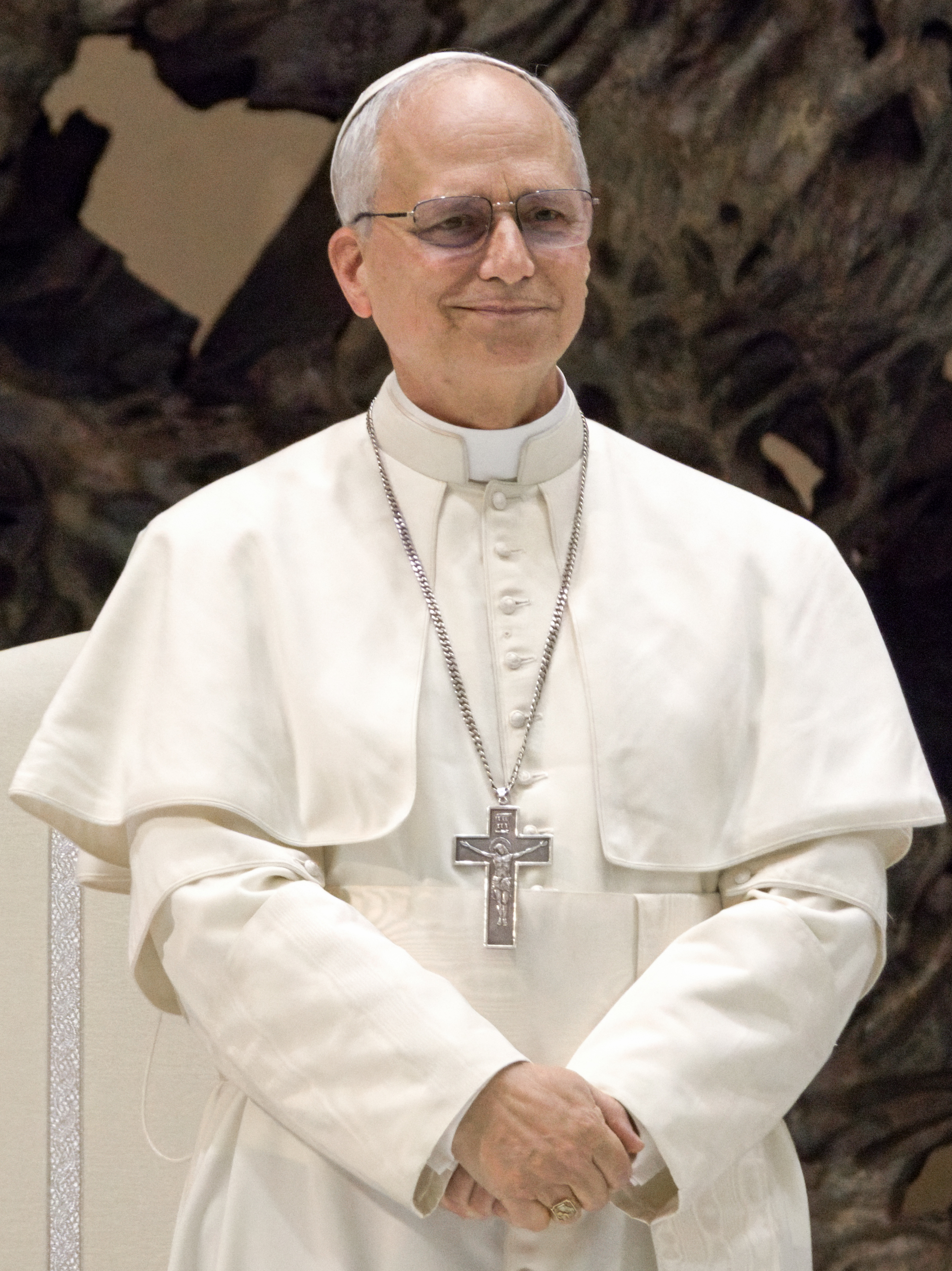
Pope Leo XIV, the leader of the Catholic Church since 2025

The Catholic Church consists of those particular Churches, headed by bishops, in communion with the pope, the bishop of Rome, as its highest authority in matters of faith, morality, and church governance. Like Eastern Orthodoxy, the Catholic Church, through apostolic succession, traces its origins to the Christian community founded by Jesus Christ. Catholics maintain that the "one, holy, catholic, and apostolic church" founded by Jesus subsists fully in the Catholic Church, but also acknowledges other Christian churches and communities and works towards reconciliation among all Christians. The Catholic faith is detailed in the Catechism of the Catholic Church.

Of its seven sacraments, the Eucharist is the principal one, celebrated liturgically in the Mass. The church teaches that through consecration by a priest, the sacrificial bread and wine become the body and blood of Christ. The Virgin Mary is venerated in the Catholic Church as Mother of God and Queen of Heaven, honoured in dogmas and devotions. Its teaching includes Divine Mercy, sanctification through faith and evangelization of the Gospel as well as Catholic social teaching, which emphasizes voluntary support for the sick, the poor, and the afflicted through the corporal and spiritual works of mercy. The Catholic Church operates thousands of Catholic schools, universities, hospitals, and orphanages around the world, and is the largest non-government provider of education and health care in the world. Among its other social services are numerous charitable and humanitarian organizations.

Canon law (Latin: jus canonicum) is the system of laws and legal principles made and enforced by the hierarchical authorities of the Catholic Church to regulate its external organisation and government and to order and direct the activities of Catholics toward the mission of the church. The canon law of the Latin Church was the first modern Western legal system, and is the oldest continuously functioning legal system in the West. while the distinctive traditions of Eastern Catholic canon law govern the 23 Eastern Catholic particular churches sui iuris.

As the world's oldest and largest continuously functioning international institution, it has played a prominent role in the history and development of Western civilization. The 2,834 sees are grouped into 24 particular autonomous Churches (the largest of which being the Latin Church), each with its own distinct traditions regarding the liturgy and the administering of sacraments. With more than 1.1 billion baptized members, the Catholic Church is the largest Christian church and represents 50.1% of all Christians as well as 16.7% of the world's population. Catholics live all over the world through missions, diaspora, and conversions.

=== Eastern Orthodox Church ===
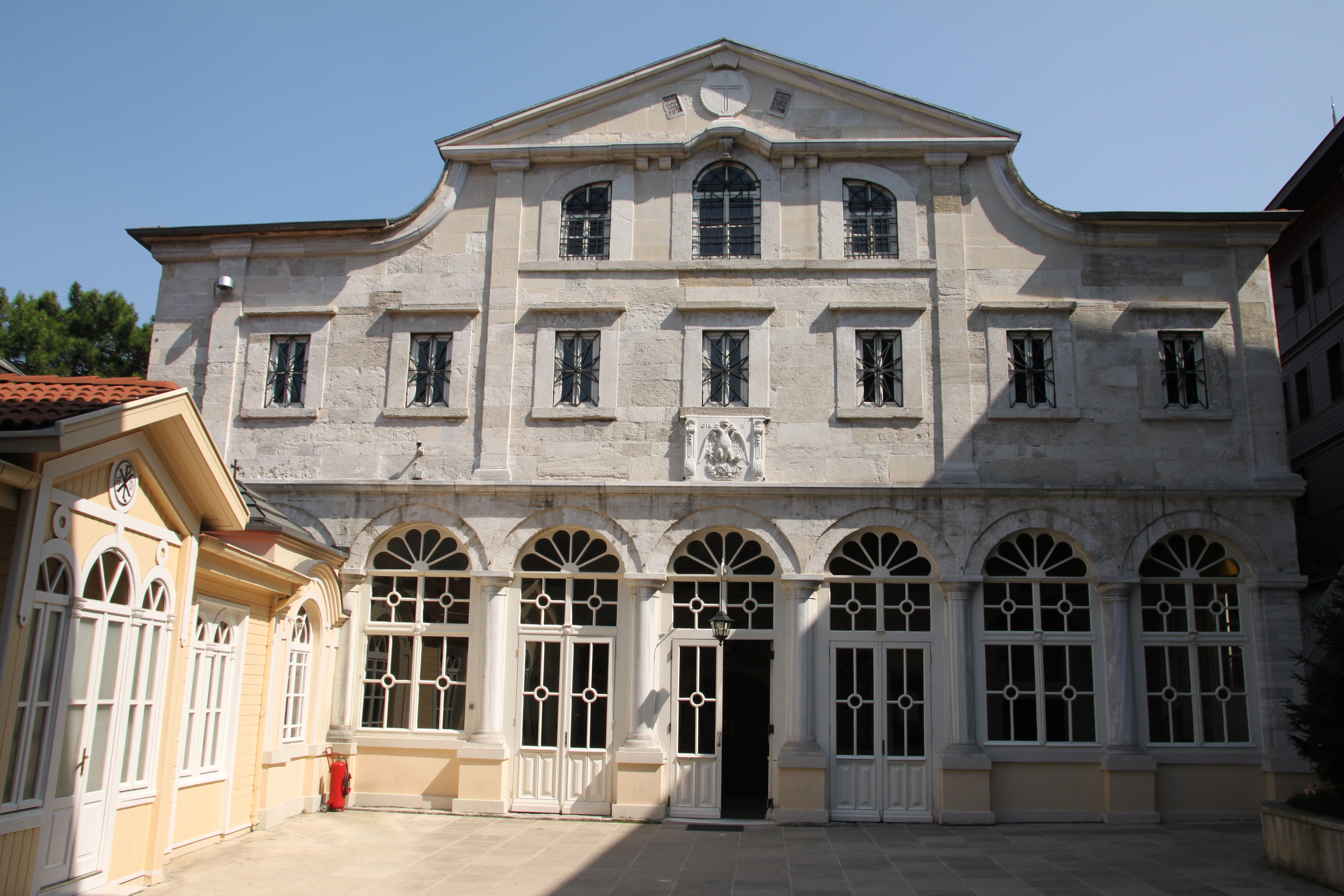
St. George's Cathedral in Istanbul: It has been the seat of the Ecumenical Patriarchate of Constantinople whose leader is regarded as the primus inter pares in the Eastern Orthodox Church.

The Eastern Orthodox Church consists of those churches in communion with the patriarchal sees of the East, such as the Ecumenical Patriarch of Constantinople. Like the Catholic Church, the Eastern Orthodox Church also traces its heritage to the foundation of Christianity through apostolic succession and has an episcopal structure, though the autonomy of its component parts is emphasized, and most of them are national churches.

Eastern Orthodox theology is based on holy tradition which incorporates the dogmatic decrees of the seven Ecumenical Councils, the Scriptures, and the teaching of the Church Fathers. The church teaches that it is the one, holy, catholic and apostolic church established by Jesus Christ in his Great Commission, and that its bishops are the successors of Christ's apostles. It maintains that it practises the original Christian faith, as passed down by holy tradition. Its patriarchates, reminiscent of the pentarchy, and other autocephalous and autonomous churches reflect a variety of hierarchical organisation. It recognizes seven major sacraments, of which the Eucharist is the principal one, celebrated liturgically in synaxis. The church teaches that through consecration invoked by a priest, the sacrificial bread and wine become the body and blood of Christ. The Virgin Mary is venerated in the Eastern Orthodox Church as the Theotokos, meaning God-bearer, and is honoured in devotions.

Eastern Orthodoxy is the second largest single denomination in Christianity, with an estimated 300 million adherents, although Protestants collectively outnumber them, substantially. As one of the oldest surviving religious institutions in the world, the Eastern Orthodox Church has played a prominent role in the history and culture of Eastern and Southeastern Europe, the Caucasus, and the Near East. The majority of Eastern Orthodox Christians live mainly in Southeast and Eastern Europe, Cyprus, Georgia, and parts of the Caucasus region, Siberia, and the Russian Far East. Over half of Eastern Orthodox Christians follow the Russian Orthodox Church, while the vast majority live within Russia. There are also communities in the former Byzantine regions of Africa, the Eastern Mediterranean, and in the Middle East. Eastern Orthodox communities are also present in many other parts of the world, particularly North America, Western Europe, and Australia, formed through diaspora, conversions, and missionary activity.

=== Oriental Orthodox Churches ===
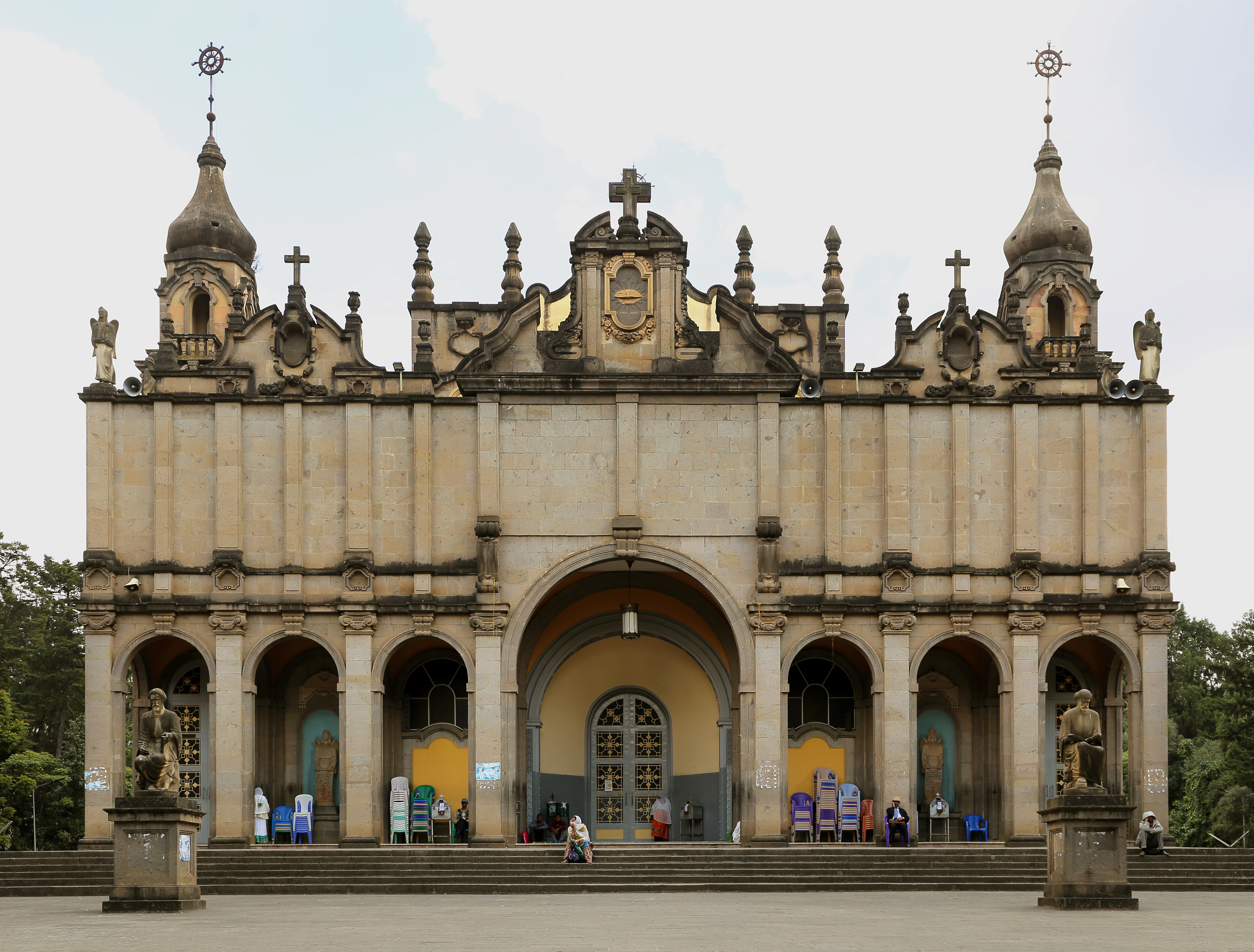
Holy Trinity Cathedral in Addis Ababa, the seat of the Ethiopian Orthodox; the largest of the Oriental Orthodox Churches

The Oriental Orthodox Churches (also called "Old Oriental" churches) are those eastern churches that recognize the first three ecumenical councils—Nicaea, Constantinople, and Ephesus—but reject the dogmatic definitions of the Council of Chalcedon and instead espouse a Miaphysite christology.

The Oriental Orthodox communion consists of six groups: Syriac Orthodox, Coptic Orthodox, Ethiopian Orthodox, Eritrean Orthodox, Malankara Orthodox Syrian Church (India), and Armenian Apostolic churches. These six churches, while being in communion with each other, are completely independent hierarchically. These churches are generally not in communion with the Eastern Orthodox Church, with whom they are in dialogue for erecting a communion. Together, they have about 62 million members worldwide.

As some of the oldest religious institutions in the world, the Oriental Orthodox Churches have played a prominent role in the history and culture of Armenia, Egypt, Turkey, Eritrea, Ethiopia, Sudan, Iran, Azerbaijan, and parts of the Middle East and India. An Eastern Christian body of autocephalous churches, its bishops are equal by virtue of episcopal ordination, and its doctrines can be summarized in that the churches recognize the validity of only the first three ecumenical councils.

Some followers of Oriental Orthodox Churches follow cultural practices that are reminiscent of Old Testament practices, like abstaining from pork, circumcising male babies, and observing ritual purification.

=== Church of the East ===
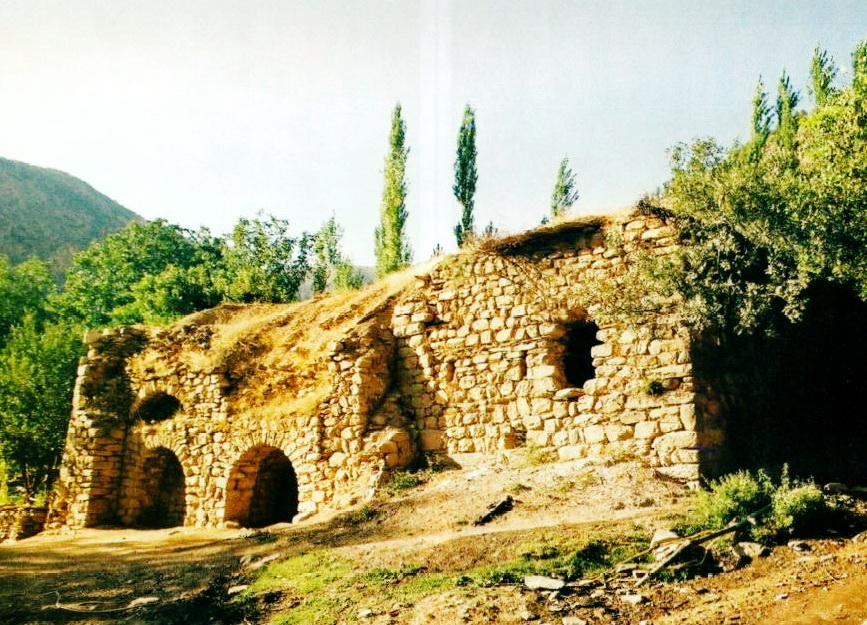
A 6th-century Nestorian church, St. John the Arab, in the Assyrian village of Geramon in Hakkari, southeastern Turkey.

The Church of the East, which was part of the Great Church, shared communion with those in the Roman Empire until the Council of Ephesus condemned Nestorius in 431. Continuing as a dhimmi community under the Rashidun Caliphate after the Muslim conquest of Persia (633–654), the Church of the East played a major role in the history of Christianity in Asia. Between the 9th and 14th centuries, it represented the world's largest Christian denomination in terms of geographical extent. It established dioceses and communities stretching from the Mediterranean Sea and today's Iraq and Iran, to India (the Saint Thomas Syrian Christians of Kerala), the Mongol kingdoms in Central Asia, and China during the Tang dynasty (7th–9th centuries). In the 13th and 14th centuries, the church experienced a final period of expansion under the Mongol Empire, where influential Church of the East clergy sat in the Mongol court.

The Assyrian Church of the East, with an unbroken patriarchate established in the 17th century, is an independent Eastern Christian denomination which claims continuity from the Church of the East—in parallel to the Catholic patriarchate established in the 16th century that evolved into the Chaldean Catholic Church, an Eastern Catholic church in full communion with the Pope. It is an Eastern Christian church that follows the traditional christology and ecclesiology of the historical Church of the East. Largely aniconic and not in communion with any other church, it belongs to the eastern branch of Syriac Christianity, and uses the East Syriac Rite in its liturgy.

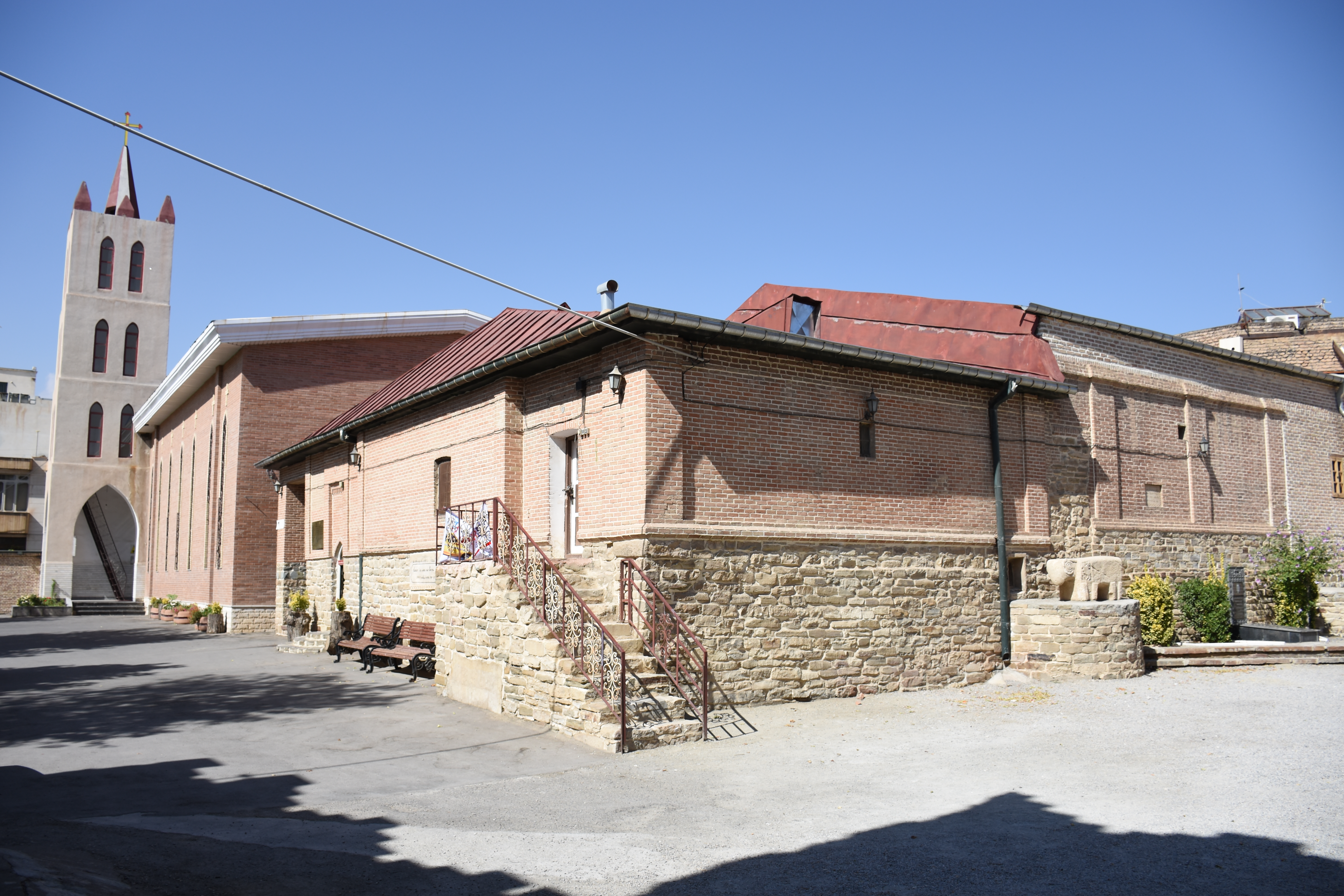
Saint Mary Church; an ancient Assyrian church located in the city of Urmia, Iran

Its main spoken language is Syriac, a dialect of Eastern Aramaic, and the majority of its adherents are ethnic Assyrians, mostly living in Iran, Iraq, Syria, Turkey, India (Chaldean Syrian Church), and in the Assyrian diaspora. It is officially headquartered in the city of Erbil in northern Iraqi Kurdistan, and its original area also spreads into south-eastern Turkey and north-western Iran, corresponding to ancient Assyria. Its hierarchy is composed of metropolitan bishops and diocesan bishops, while lower clergy consists of priests and deacons, who serve in dioceses (eparchies) and parishes throughout the Middle East, India, North America, Oceania, and Europe (including the Caucasus and Russia).

The Ancient Church of the East distinguished itself from the Assyrian Church of the East in 1964. It is one of the Assyrian churches that claim continuity with the historical Church of the East, one of the oldest Christian churches in Mesopotamia. It is officially headquartered in the city of Baghdad, Iraq. The majority of its adherents are ethnic Assyrians.

=== Protestantism ===
In 1521, the Edict of Worms condemned Martin Luther and officially banned citizens of the Holy Roman Empire from defending or propagating his ideas. This split within the Roman Catholic church is now called the Reformation. Prominent Reformers included Martin Luther, Huldrych Zwingli, and John Calvin. The 1529 Protestation at Speyer against being excommunicated gave this party the name Protestantism. Luther's primary theological heirs are known as Lutherans. Zwingli and Calvin's heirs are far broader denominationally and are referred to as the Reformed tradition. The Anglican churches descended from the Church of England and organized in the Anglican Communion. Some Lutherans identify as Evangelical Catholics and some but not all Anglicans consider themselves both Protestant and Catholic. Protestants have developed their own culture, with major contributions in education, the humanities and sciences, the political and social order, the economy and the arts, and many other fields.

Since the Anglican, Lutheran, and the Reformed branches of Protestantism originated for the most part in cooperation with the government, these movements are termed the "Magisterial Reformation". On the other hand, groups such as the Anabaptists, who often do not consider themselves to be Protestant, originated in the Radical Reformation, which though sometimes protected under Acts of Toleration, do not trace their history back to any state church. They are further distinguished by their rejection of infant baptism; they believe in baptism only of adult believers—credobaptism (Anabaptists include the Amish, Apostolic, Bruderhof, Mennonites, Hutterites, River Brethren and Schwarzenau Brethren groups.)

The term Protestant also refers to any churches which formed later, with either the Magisterial or Radical traditions. In the 18th century, for example, Methodism grew out of Anglican minister John Wesley's evangelical revival movement. Several Pentecostal and non-denominational churches, which emphasize the cleansing power of the Holy Spirit, in turn grew out of Methodism. Because Methodists, Pentecostals and other evangelicals stress "accepting Jesus as your personal Lord and Savior", which comes from Wesley's emphasis of the New Birth, they often refer to themselves as being born again.

Protestantism is the second largest major group of Christians after Catholicism by number of followers, although the Eastern Orthodox Church is larger than any single Protestant denomination. Estimates vary, mainly over the question of which denominations to classify as Protestant. The total Protestant population has reached 1.17 billion in 2024, corresponding to nearly 44% of the world's Christians. The majority of Protestants are members of just a handful of denominational families, i.e. Adventism, Anabaptism (Amish, Apostolic, Bruderhof, Hutterites, Mennonites, River Brethren, and Schwarzenau Brethren), Anglicanism, Baptists, Lutheranism, Methodism, Moravianism/Hussites, Pentecostalism, Plymouth Brethren, Quakerism, Reformed Christianity (Congregationalists, Continental Reformed, Reformed Anglicans, and Presbyterians), and Waldensianism are the main families of Protestantism. Nondenominational, evangelical, charismatic, neo-charismatic, independent, and other churches are on the rise, and constitute a significant part of Protestant Christianity.

Some groups of individuals who hold basic Protestant tenets identify themselves as "Christians" or "born-again Christians". They typically distance themselves from the confessionalism and creedalism of other Christian communities by calling themselves "non-denominational" or "evangelical". Often founded by individual pastors, they have little affiliation with historic denominations.

Historical chart of the main Protestant branches

=== Restorationism ===
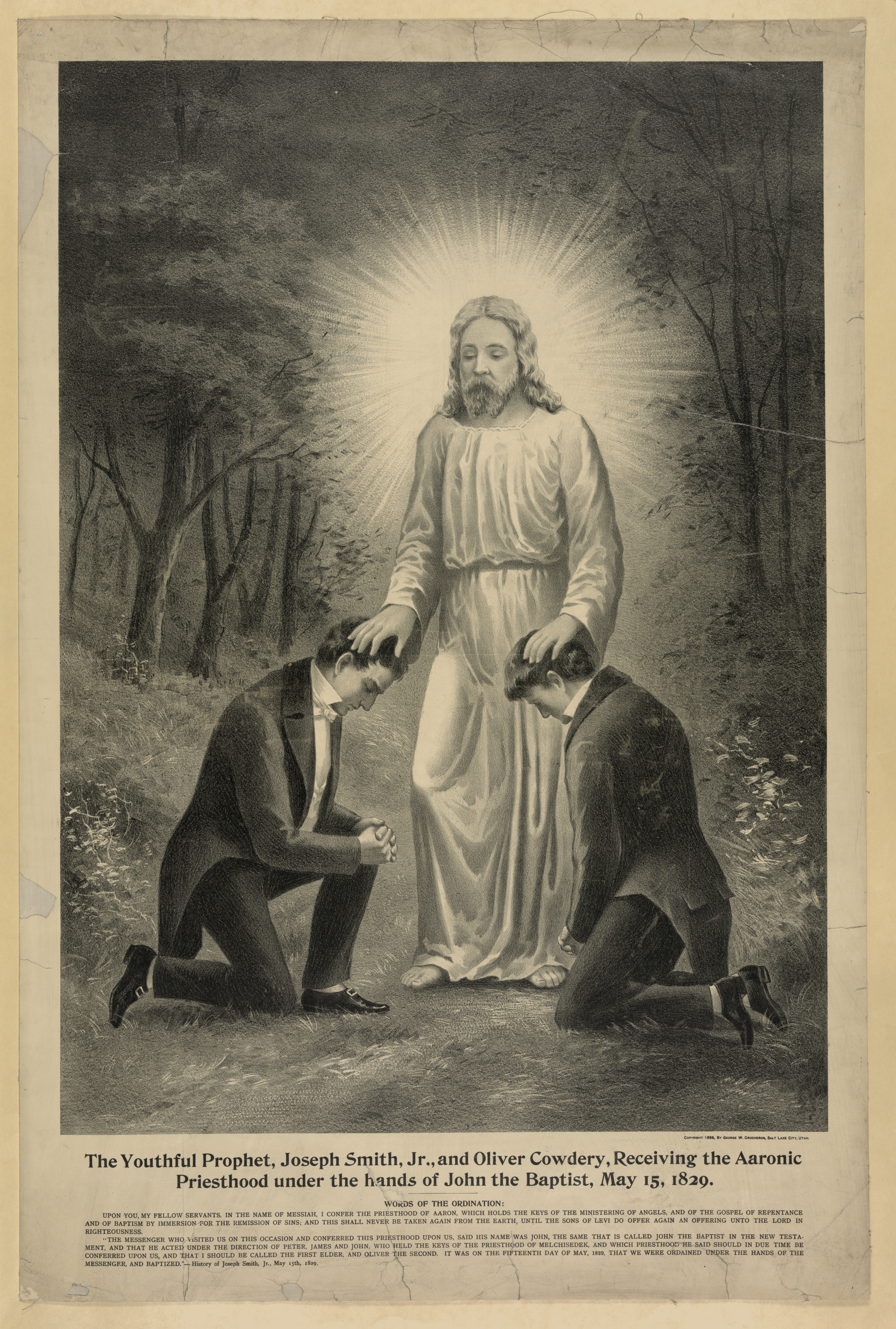
A 19th-century drawing of Joseph Smith and Oliver Cowdery receiving the Aaronic priesthood from John the Baptist. Latter Day Saints believe that the Priesthood ceased to exist on the earth after the death of the apostles and therefore needed to be restored.

The Second Great Awakening, a period of religious revival that occurred in the United States during the early 1800s, saw the development of a number of unrelated churches. They generally saw themselves as restoring the original church of Jesus Christ rather than reforming one of the existing churches. A common belief held by Restorationists was that the other divisions of Christianity had introduced doctrinal defects into Christianity, which was known as the Great Apostasy. In Asia, Iglesia ni Cristo is a known Restorationist denomination that was established during the early 1900s. Other examples of Restorationist denominations include Irvingianism and Swedenborgianism.

Some of the churches originating during this period are historically connected to early 19th-century camp meetings in the Midwest and upstate New York. One of the largest churches produced from the movement is the Church of Jesus Christ of Latter-day Saints. American Millennialism and Adventism, which arose from Evangelical Protestantism, influenced the Jehovah's Witnesses movement and, as a reaction specifically to William Miller, the Seventh-day Adventists. Others, including the Christian Church (Disciples of Christ), Evangelical Christian Church in Canada, Churches of Christ, and the Christian churches and churches of Christ, have their roots in the contemporaneous Stone-Campbell Restoration Movement, which was centered in Kentucky and Tennessee. Other groups originating in this time period include the Christadelphians and the previously mentioned Latter Day Saints movement. While the churches originating in the Second Great Awakening have some superficial similarities, their doctrine and practices vary significantly.

=== Other ===
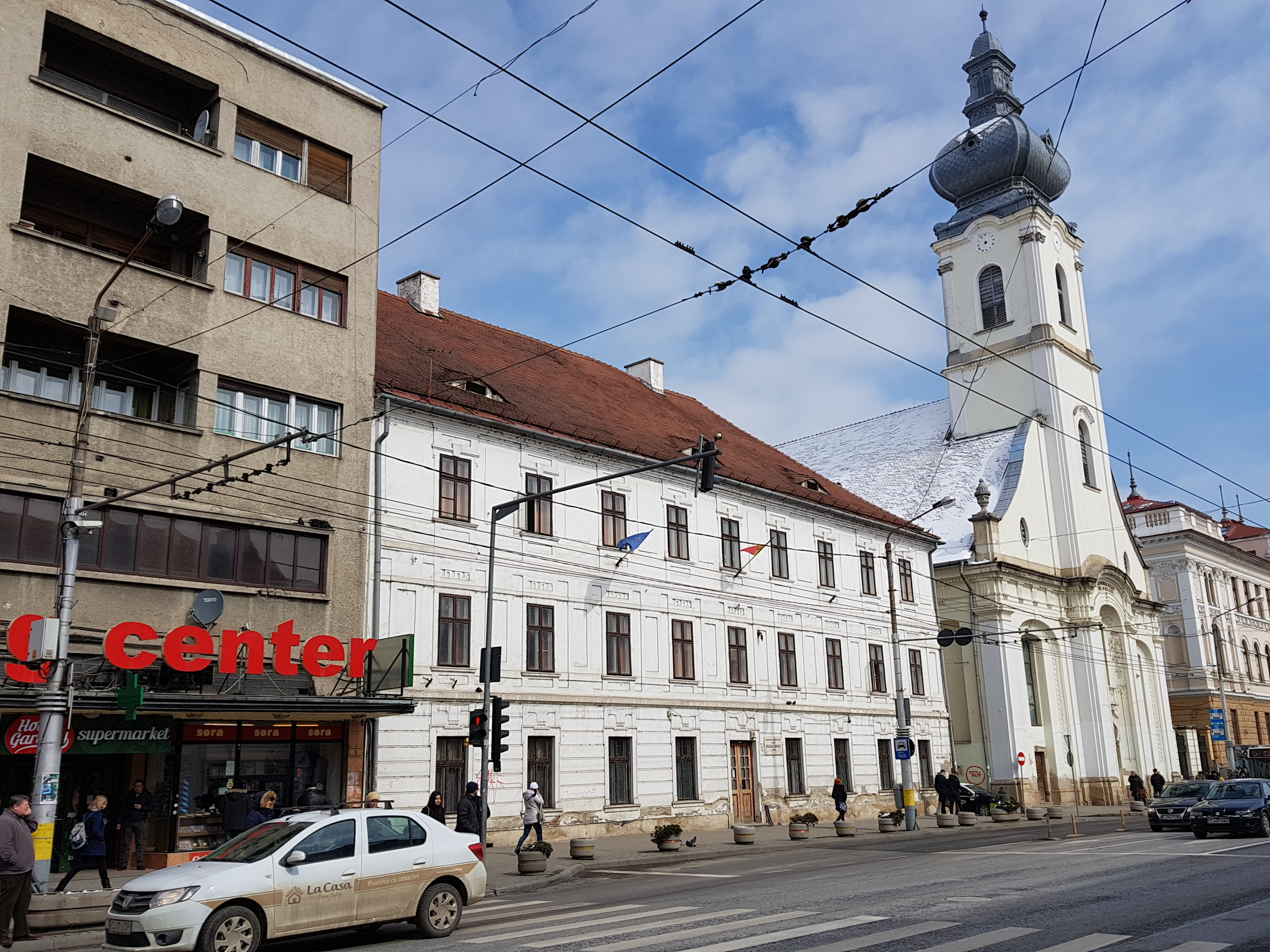
Unitarian Church of Transylvania in Cluj-Napoca

Within Italy, Poland, Lithuania, Transylvania, Hungary, Romania, and the United Kingdom, Unitarian Churches emerged from the Reformed tradition in the 16th century; the Unitarian Church of Transylvania is an example of such a denomination that arose in this era. They adopted the Anabaptist doctrine of credobaptism.

Various smaller Independent Catholic communities, such as the Old Catholic Church, include the word Catholic in their title, and arguably have more or less liturgical practices in common with the Catholic Church but are no longer in full communion with the Holy See.

Spiritual Christians, such as the Doukhobors and Molokans, broke from the Russian Orthodox Church and maintain close association with Mennonites and Quakers due to similar religious practices; all of these groups are furthermore collectively considered to be peace churches due to their belief in pacifism.

Messianic Judaism (or the Messianic Movement) is the name of a Christian movement comprising a number of streams, whose members may consider themselves Jewish. The movement originated in the 1960s and 1970s, and it blends elements of religious Jewish practice with evangelical Christianity. Messianic Judaism affirms Christian creeds such as the messiahship and divinity of "Yeshua" (the Hebrew name of Jesus) and the Triune Nature of God, while also adhering to some Jewish dietary laws and customs.

Esoteric Christians, such as The Christian Community, regard Christianity as a mystery religion and profess the existence and possession of certain esoteric doctrines or practices, hidden from the public and accessible only to a narrow circle of "enlightened", "initiated", or highly educated people.

Nondenominational Christianity or non-denominational Christianity consists of churches which typically distance themselves from the confessionalism or creedalism of other Christian communities by not formally aligning with a specific Christian denomination. Nondenominational Christianity first arose in the 18th century through the Stone-Campbell Restoration Movement, with followers organizing themselves as "Christians" and "Disciples of Christ", (Note: The first Nondenominational Christian churches which emerged through the Stone-Campbell Restoration Movement are tied to associations such as the Churches of Christ or the Christian Church (Disciples of Christ).) but many typically adhere to evangelical Christianity.

== Cultural influence ==
Christian culture
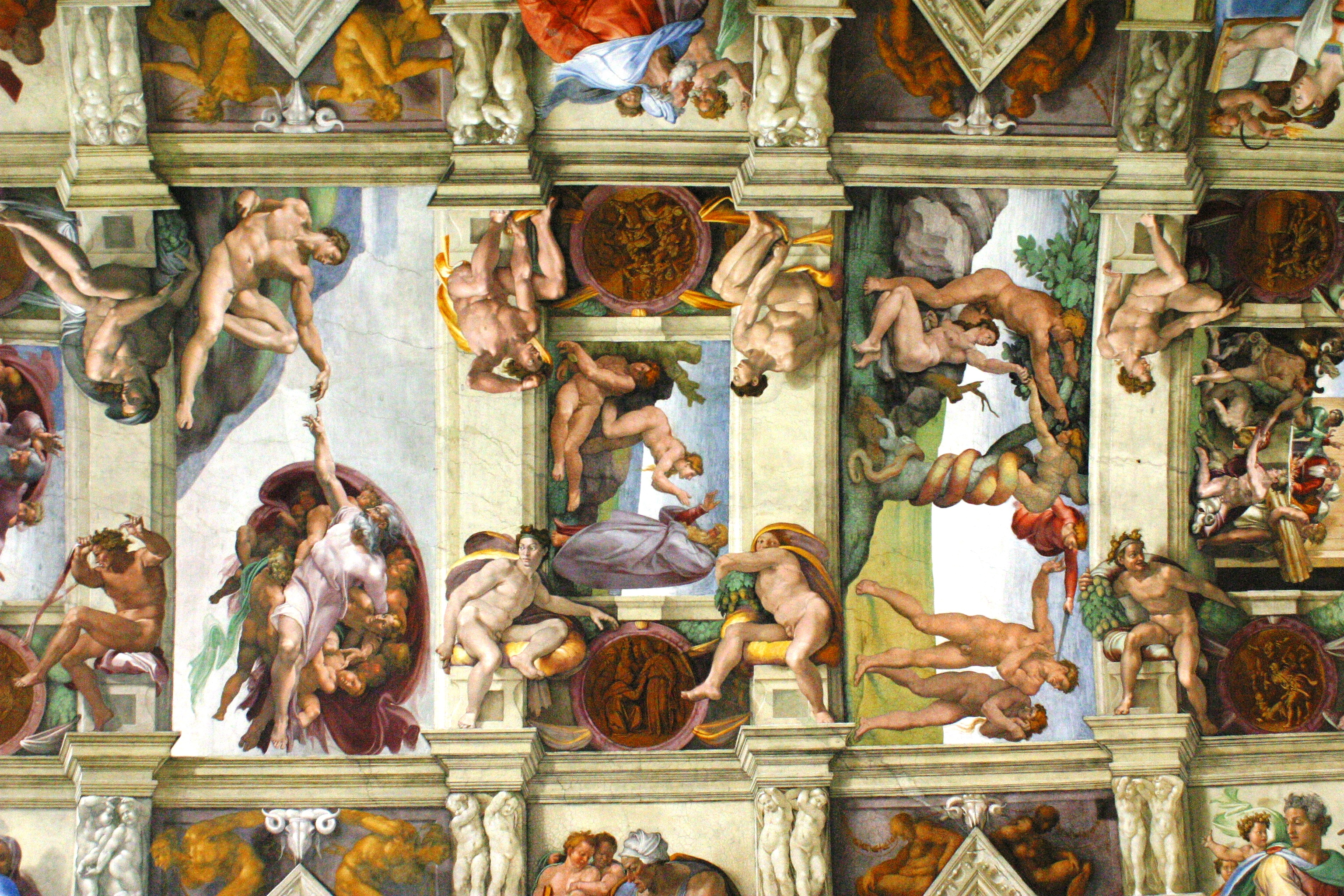
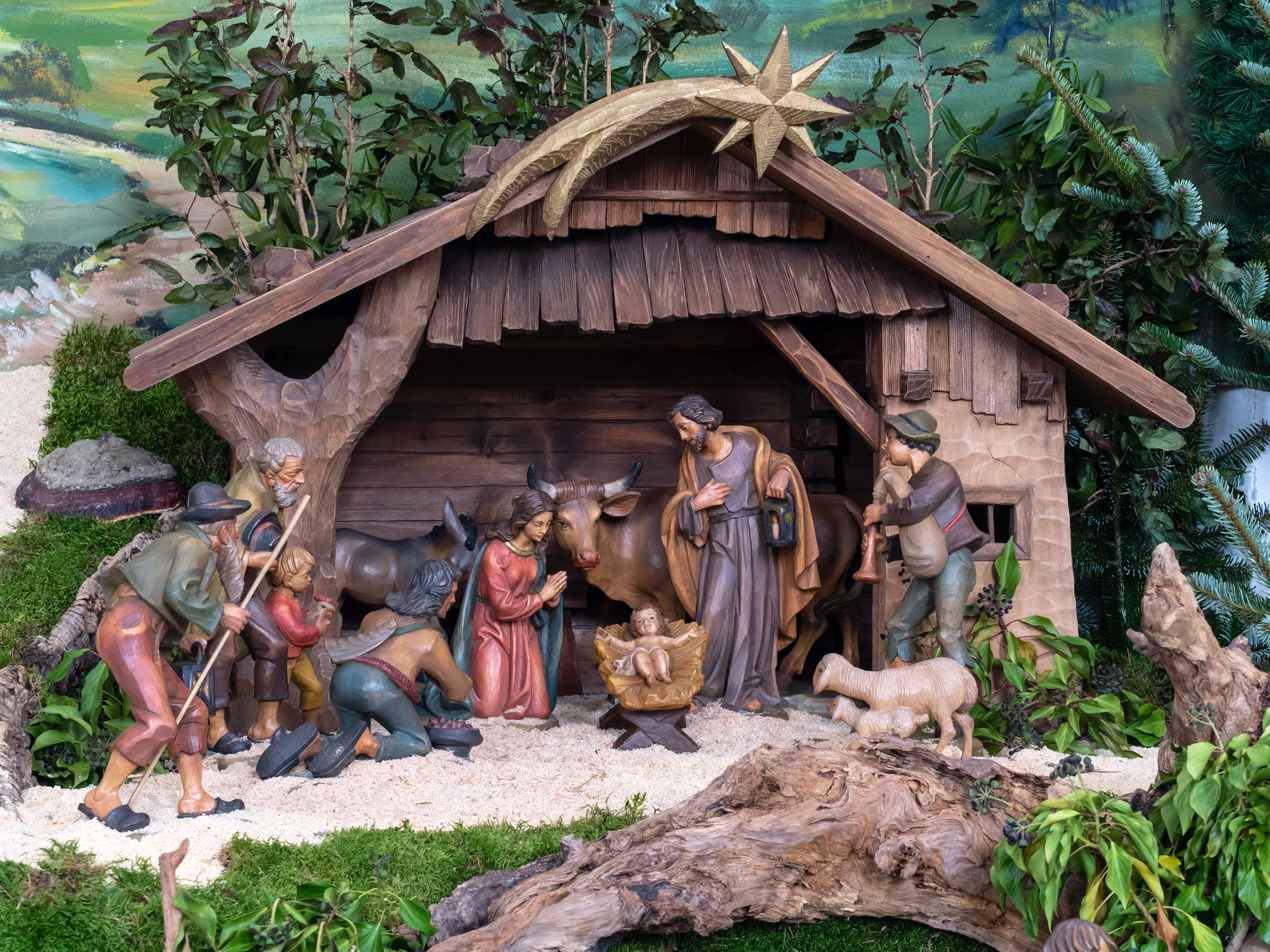
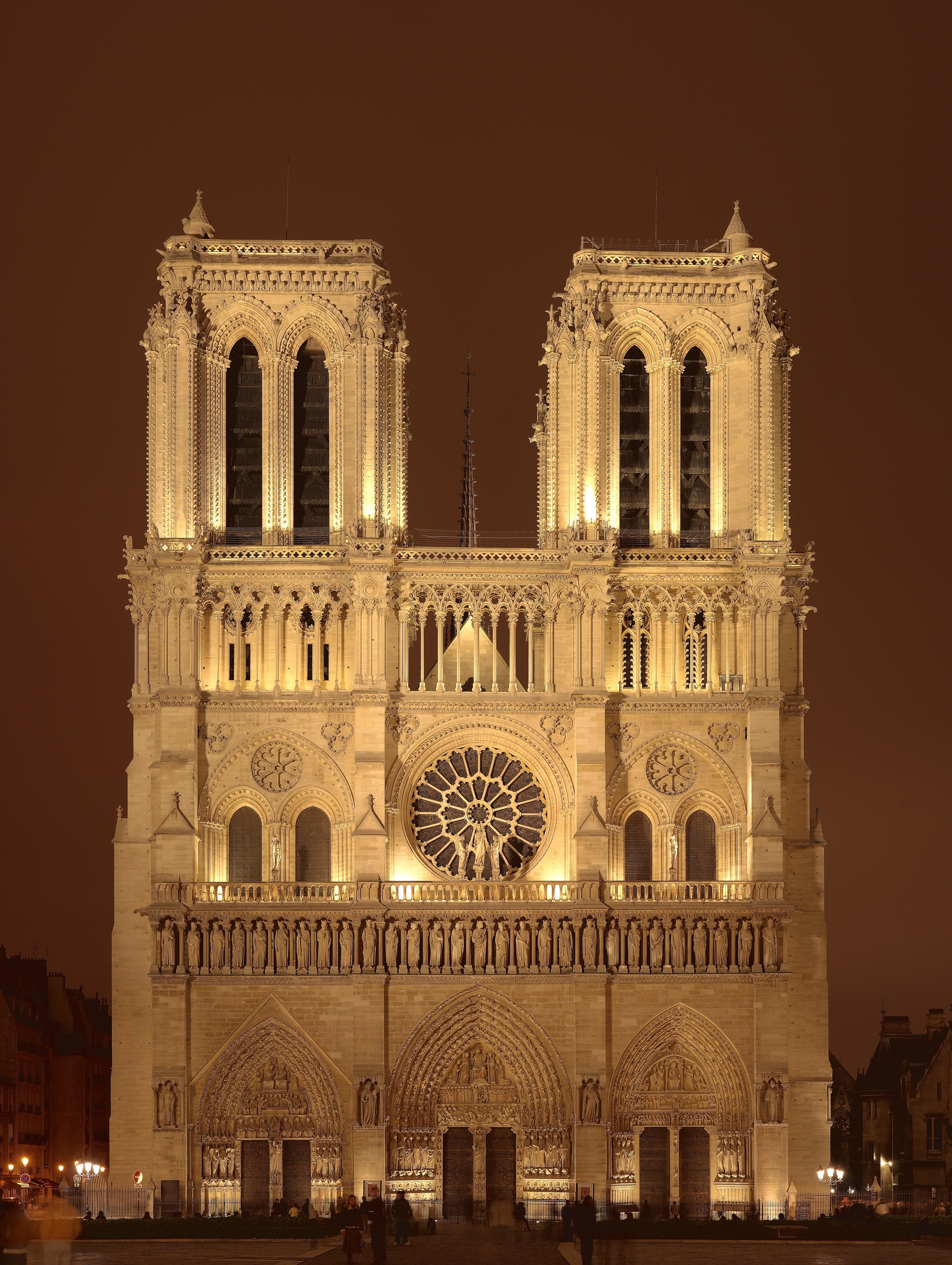
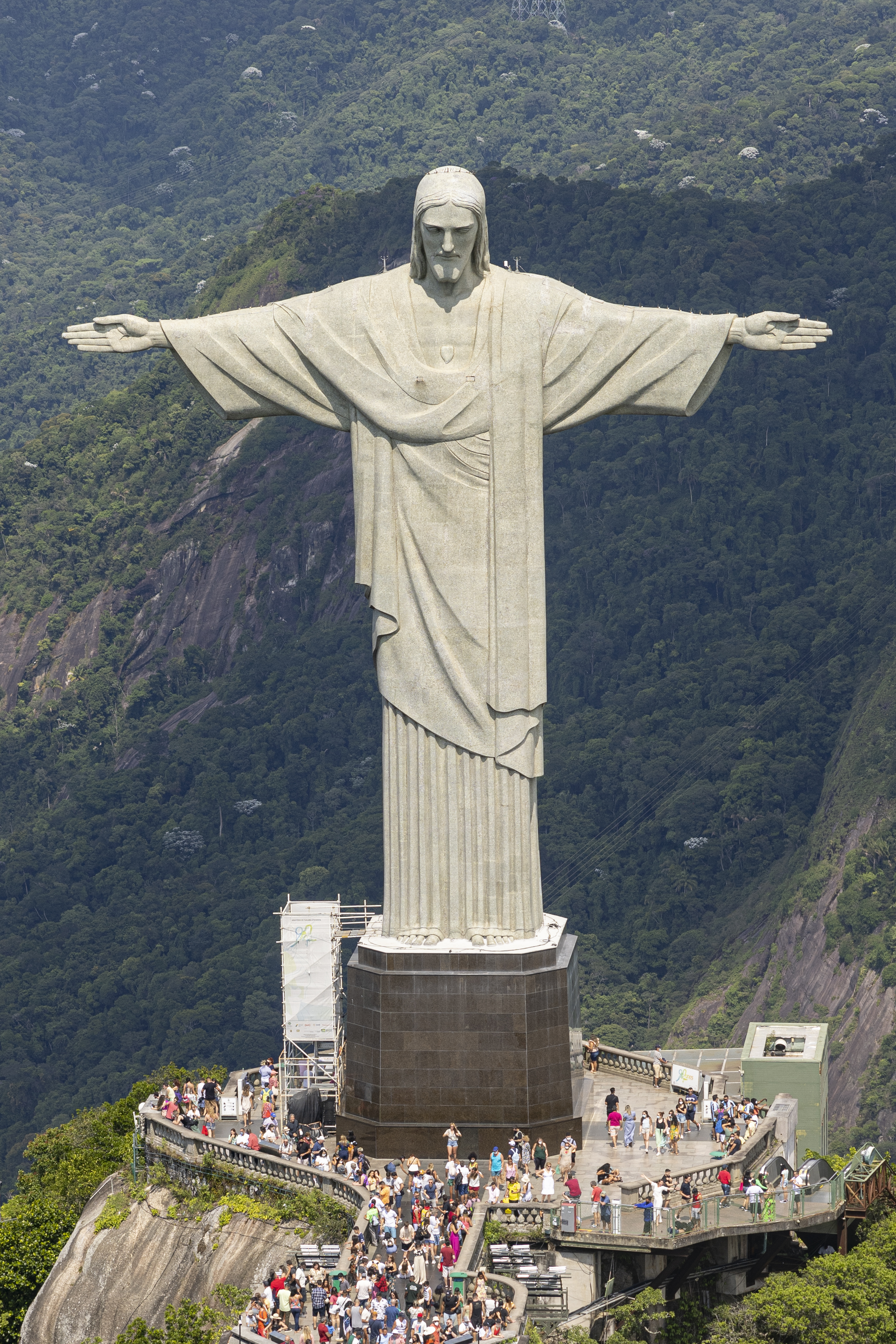
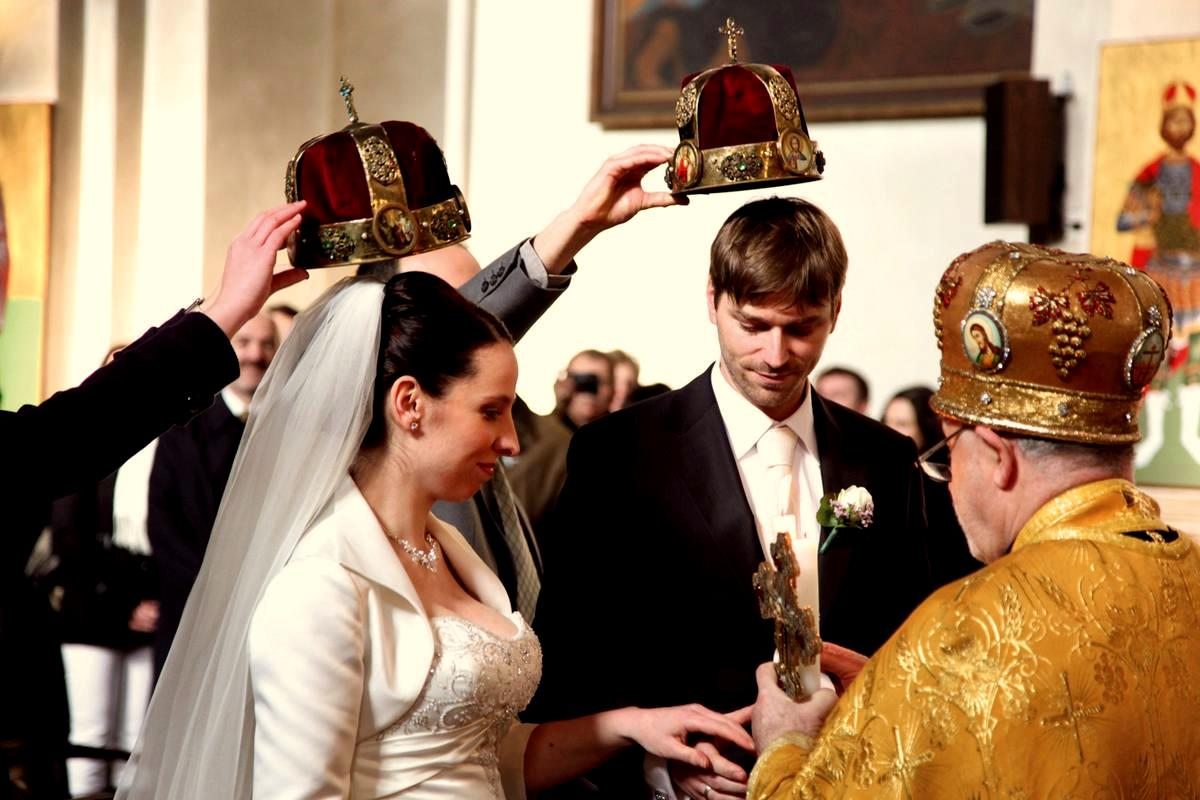
Clockwise from top: Sistine Chapel ceiling, Notre-Dame cathedral in Paris, Eastern Orthodox wedding, Christ the Redeemer statue, Nativity scene

The history of the Christendom spans about 1,700 years and includes a variety of socio-political developments, as well as advances in the arts, architecture, literature, science, philosophy, and technology. Since the spread of Christianity from the Levant to Europe and North Africa during the early Roman Empire, Christendom has been divided in the pre-existing Greek East and Latin West. Consequently, different versions of the Christian cultures arose with their own rites and practices, centered around the cities of Rome (Western Christianity) and Carthage, whose communities were called Western or Latin Christendom, and Constantinople (Eastern Christianity), Antioch (Syriac Christianity), Kerala (Indian Christianity) and Alexandria (Coptic Christianity), whose communities were called Eastern or Oriental Christendom. The Byzantine Empire was one of the peaks in Christian history and Eastern Christian civilization. From the 11th to 13th centuries, Latin Christendom rose to the central role of the Western world.

The Bible has had a profound influence on Western civilization and on cultures around the globe; it has contributed to the formation of Western law, art, texts, and education. With a literary tradition spanning two millennia, the Bible is one of the most influential works ever written. From practices of personal hygiene to philosophy and ethics, the Bible has directly and indirectly influenced politics and law, war and peace, sexual morals, marriage and family life, toilet etiquette, letters and learning, the arts, economics, social justice, medical care and more.

Christians have made a myriad of contributions to human progress in a broad and diverse range of fields, including philosophy, science and technology, medicine, fine arts and architecture, politics, literatures, music, and business. According to 100 Years of Nobel Prizes a review of the Nobel Prizes award between 1901 and 2000 reveals that (65.4%) of Nobel Prizes Laureates, have identified Christianity in its various forms as their religious preference.

Outside the Western world, Christianity has had an influence on various cultures, such as in Africa, the Near East, Middle East, East Asia, Southeast Asia, and the Indian subcontinent. Eastern Christian scientists and scholars of the medieval Islamic world (particularly Jacobite and Nestorian Christians) contributed to the Islamic civilization during the reign of the Umayyads and the Abbasids, by translating works of Greek philosophers to Syriac and afterwards, to Arabic. They also excelled in philosophy, science, theology, and medicine. Scholars and intellectuals agree Christians in the Middle East have made significant contributions to Islamic civilization since the introduction of Islam, and they have had a significant impact contributing the culture of the Mashriq, Turkey, and Iran.

=== Influence on Western culture ===
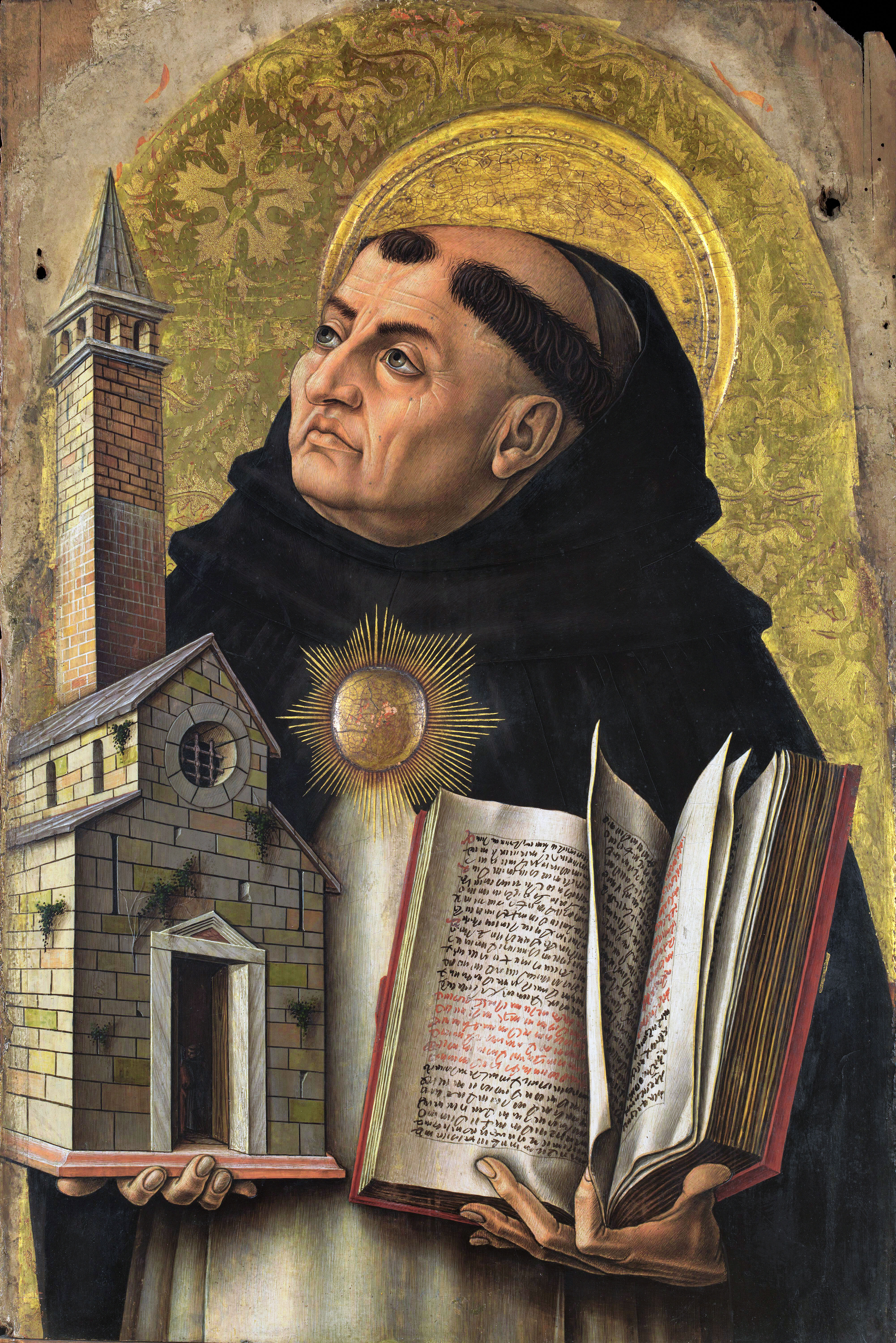
Thomas Aquinas, an Italian Dominican friar and priest, the foremost Scholastic thinker, as well as one of the most influential philosophers and theologians in the Western tradition.

Western culture, throughout most of its history, has been nearly equivalent to Christian culture, and a large portion of the population of the Western Hemisphere can be described as practicing or nominal Christians. The notion of "Europe" and the "Western World" has been intimately connected with the concept of "Christianity and Christendom". Many historians even attribute Christianity for being the link that created a unified European identity.

Though Western culture contained several polytheistic religions during its early years under the Greek and Roman Empires, as the centralized Roman power waned, the dominance of the Catholic Church was the only consistent force in Western Europe. Until the Age of Enlightenment, Christian culture guided the course of philosophy, literature, art, music and science. Christian disciplines of the respective arts have subsequently developed into Christian philosophy, Christian art, Christian music, Christian literature, and so on.

Christianity has had a significant impact on education, as the church created the bases of the Western system of education, and was the sponsor of founding universities in the Western world, as the university is generally regarded as an institution that has its origin in the Medieval Christian setting. Historically, Christianity has often been a patron of science and medicine; many Catholic clergy, Jesuits in particular, have been active in the sciences throughout history and have made significant contributions to the development of science. Some scholars state that Christianity contributed to the rise of the Scientific Revolution. Protestantism also has had an important influence on science. According to the Merton Thesis, there was a positive correlation between the rise of English Puritanism and German Pietism on the one hand, and early experimental science on the other. The civilizing influence of Christianity includes social welfare, contribution to the medical and health care, founding hospitals, economics (as the Protestant work ethic), architecture, literature, personal hygiene (ablution), and family life. Historically, extended families were the basic family unit in the Christian culture and countries.

Cultural Christians are secular people with a Christian heritage who may not believe in the religious claims of Christianity, but who retain an affinity for the popular culture, art, music, and so on related to the religion.

Postchristianity is a term for the decline of Christianity, particularly in Europe, Canada, Australia, and to a minor degree the Southern Cone, in the 20th and 21st centuries, considered in terms of postmodernism. It refers to the loss of Christianity's monopoly on values and world view in historically Christian societies.

Christian leaders and congregations have had an influence on the broader environmental movement. Christian teachings relate to ecology, and draw on teachings of the Bible to promote the moral responsibility of humans to care for God's creation. Christianity acknowledges the tension between humanity's duty to care for God's creation and the natural human inclination to resist God's will. In recent decades, major Christian denominations have revisited their teachings and practices in response to the environmental crisis. There has been a rise in activity in Christian congregations to curb climate change, partly inspired by the advocacy of Pope Francis following his publication of the encyclical letter Laudato Si'—On Care for Our Common Home. Organizations such as Green Christian, Laudato Si' Movement, and the Interfaith Center for Sustainable Development are a few examples of groups working in the Christian and ecology movement. These initiatives reflect how Christians, alongside other people of faith, are increasingly embracing ecological concerns, recognizing that the protection of the Earth is a spiritual imperative tied to faith and justice.

== Ecumenism ==
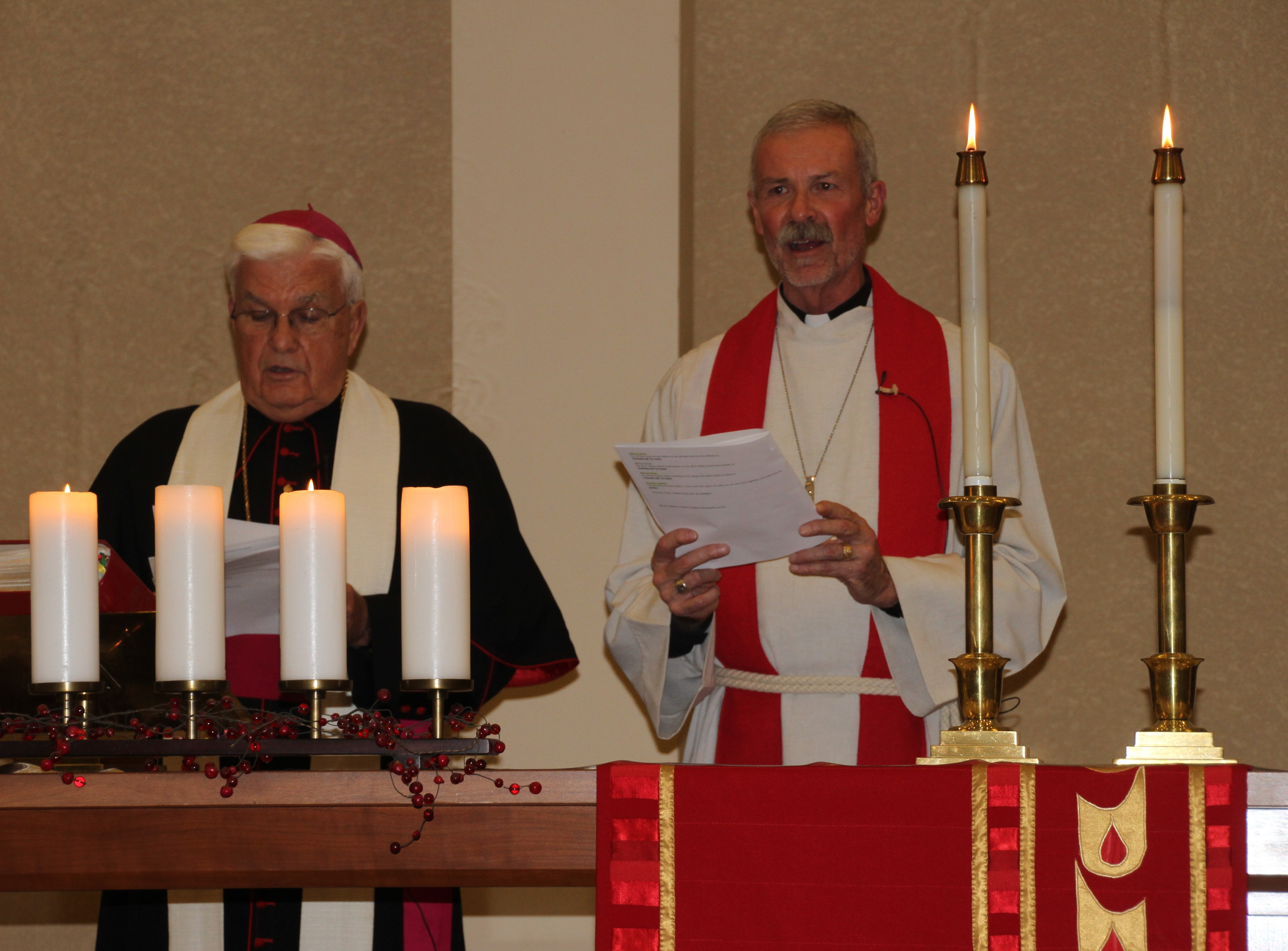
Bishop John M. Quinn of the Roman Catholic Diocese of Winona and Bishop Steven Delzer of Evangelical Lutheran Southeastern Minnesota Synod leading a Reformation Day service (2017)

Christian groups, sects and denominations have long expressed ideals of being reconciled, and in the 20th century, Christian ecumenism advanced in two ways. One way was greater cooperation between groups, such as the World Evangelical Alliance founded in 1846 in London or the Edinburgh Missionary Conference of Protestants in 1910, the Justice, Peace and Creation Commission of the World Council of Churches founded in 1948 by Protestant and Orthodox churches, and similar national councils like the National Council of Churches in Australia, which includes Catholics.

The other way was an institutional union with united churches, a practice that can be traced back to unions between Lutherans and Calvinists in early 19th-century Germany. Congregationalist, Methodist, and Presbyterian churches united in 1925 to form the United Church of Canada, and in 1977 to form the Uniting Church in Australia. The Church of South India was formed in 1947 by the union of Anglican, Baptist, Methodist, Congregationalist, and Presbyterian churches.

The Christian Flag is an ecumenical flag designed in the early 20th century to represent all of Christianity and Christendom. Substantial agreement between various Christian denominations, especially those of Catholicism and Protestantism, has led to a unified presentation of the Christian religion in The Common Catechism.

The ecumenical, monastic Taizé Community is notable for being composed of more than one hundred brothers from Protestant and Catholic traditions. The community emphasizes the reconciliation of all denominations and its main church, located in Taizé, Saône-et-Loire, France, is named the "Church of Reconciliation". The community is internationally known, attracting over 100,000 young pilgrims annually.

Steps towards reconciliation on a global level were taken in 1965 by the Catholic and Orthodox churches, mutually revoking the excommunications that marked their Great Schism in 1054; the Anglican Catholic International Commission (ARCIC) working towards full communion between those churches since 1970; and the Lutheran World Federation and the Catholic Church signing the Joint Declaration on the Doctrine of Justification in 1999 to address conflicts at the root of the Protestant Reformation. In 2006, the World Methodist Council, representing all Methodist denominations, adopted the declaration.

== Criticism, persecution, and apologetics ==
=== Criticism ===
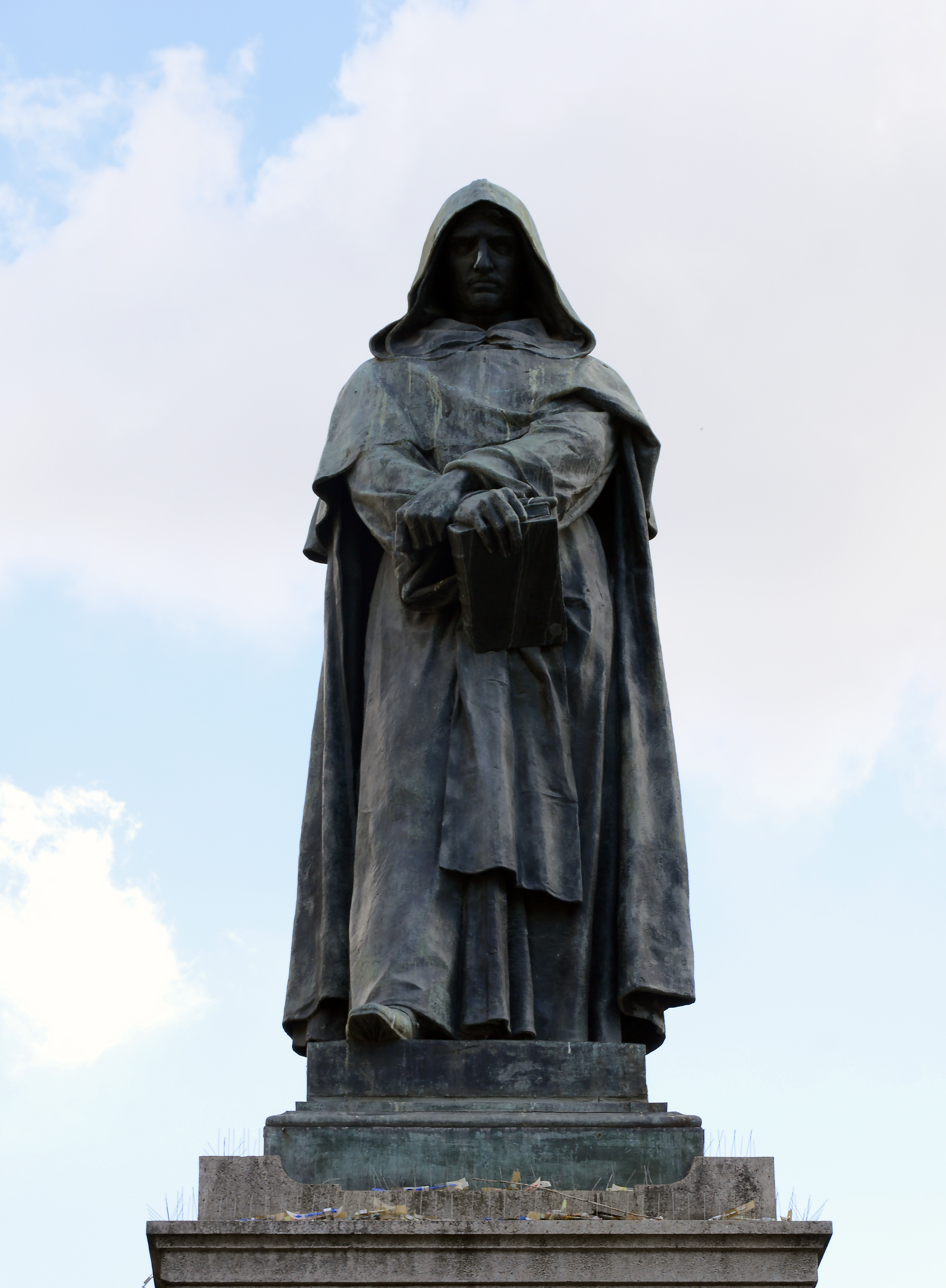
The monument to Giordano Bruno in the place he was executed in Rome

Criticism of Christianity and Christians goes back to the Apostolic Age, with the New Testament recording friction between the followers of Jesus and the Pharisees and scribes (e.g., Matthew 15:1–20 and Mark 7:1–23). In the 2nd century, Christianity was criticized by the Jews on various grounds, e.g., that the prophecies of the Hebrew Bible could not have been fulfilled by Jesus, given that he did not have a successful life. Additionally, a sacrifice to remove sins in advance, for everyone or as a human being, did not fit the Jewish sacrifice ritual; furthermore, God in Judaism is said to judge people on their deeds instead of their beliefs. One of the first comprehensive attacks on Christianity came from the Greek philosopher Celsus, who wrote The True Word, a polemic criticizing Christians as being unprofitable members of society. In response, the church father Origen published his treatise Contra Celsum, or Against Celsus, a seminal work of Christian apologetics, which systematically addressed Celsus's criticisms and helped bring Christianity a level of academic respectability.

By the 3rd century, criticism of Christianity had mounted. Wild rumors about Christians were widely circulated, claiming that they were atheists and that, as part of their rituals, they devoured human infants and engaged in incestuous orgies. The Neoplatonist philosopher Porphyry wrote the fifteen-volume Adversus Christianos as a comprehensive attack on Christianity, in part building on the teachings of Plotinus.

By the 12th century, the Mishneh Torah (i.e., Rabbi Moses Maimonides) was criticizing Christianity on the grounds of idol worship, in that Christians attributed divinity to Jesus, who had a physical body. In the 19th century, Nietzsche began to write a series of polemics on the "unnatural" teachings of Christianity (e.g. sexual abstinence), and continued his criticism of Christianity to the end of his life. In the 20th century, the philosopher Bertrand Russell expressed his criticism of Christianity in Why I Am Not a Christian, formulating his rejection of Christianity.

Criticism of Christianity continues to date, e.g. Jewish and Muslim theologians criticize the doctrine of the Trinity held by most Christians, stating that this doctrine in effect assumes that there are three gods, running against the basic tenet of monotheism. New Testament scholar Robert M. Price has outlined the possibility that some Bible stories are based partly on myth in The Christ Myth Theory and its problems.

=== Persecution ===
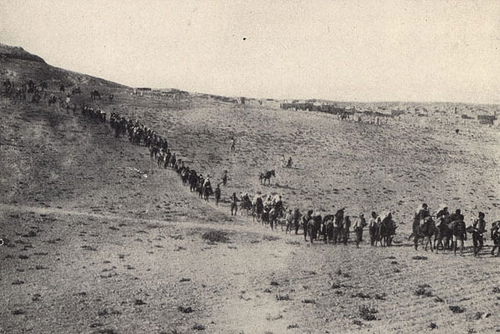
Christians fleeing their homes in the Ottoman Empire, c. 1922. Many Christians were persecuted and killed during the Armenian genocide, Greek genocide, and Assyrian genocide.

Christians are one of the most persecuted religious groups in the world, especially in the Middle-East, North Africa and South and East Asia. In 2017, Open Doors estimated approximately 260 million Christians are subjected annually to "high, very high, or extreme persecution" with North Korea considered the most hazardous nation for Christians. In 2019, a report commissioned by the United Kingdom's Secretary of State of the Foreign and Commonwealth Office (FCO) to investigate global persecution of Christians found persecution has increased, and is highest in the Middle East, North Africa, India, China, North Korea, and Latin America, among others, and that it is global and not limited to Islamic states. This investigation found that approximately 80% of persecuted believers worldwide are Christians.

=== Apologetics ===
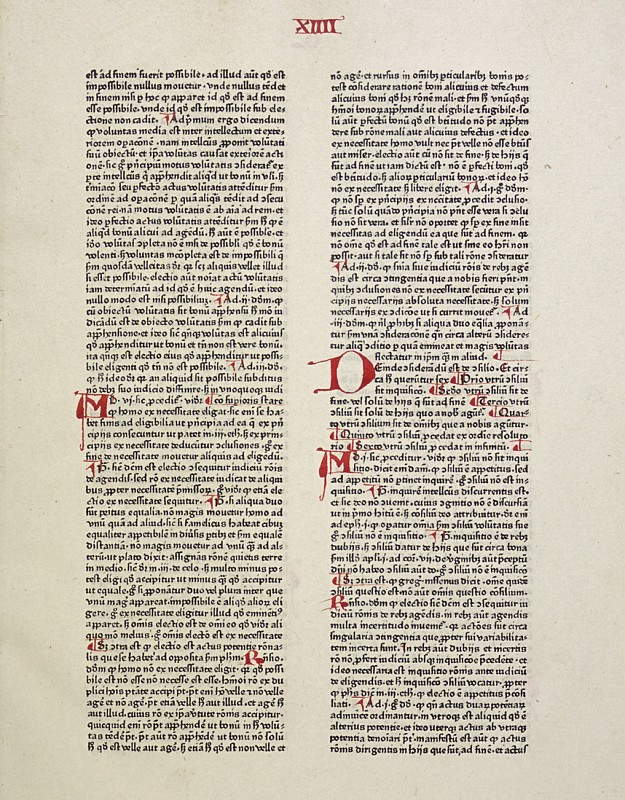
A copy of the Summa Theologica by Thomas Aquinas

Christian apologetics aims to present a rational basis for Christianity. The word "apologetic" (Greek: ἀπολογητικός apologētikos) comes from the Greek verb ἀπολογέομαι apologeomai, meaning "(I) speak in defense of". Christian apologetics has taken many forms over the centuries, starting with Paul the Apostle. The philosopher Thomas Aquinas presented five arguments for God's existence in the Summa Theologica, while his Summa contra Gentiles was a major apologetic work. Another famous apologist, G. K. Chesterton, wrote in the early twentieth century about the benefits of religion and, specifically, Christianity. Famous for his use of paradox, Chesterton explained that while Christianity had the most mysteries, it was the most practical religion. He pointed to the advance of Christian civilizations as proof of its practicality. The physicist and priest John Polkinghorne, in his Questions of Truth, discusses the subject of religion and science, a topic that other Christian apologists such as Ravi Zacharias, John Lennox, and William Lane Craig have engaged, with the latter two men opining that the inflationary Big Bang model is evidence for the existence of God. Creationist apologetics are apologetics that aim to defend creationism.

== See also ==
- Outline of Christianity
- Christian atheism
- Christians of Saint John
- Christianity and Islam
- Christianity and Judaism
- Christianity and politics
- Christian mythology
- Christianisation
- One true church
- Prophets in Christianity
- Christian ethics
