= John William McGarvey =

American minister, author and religious educator (1829–1911)

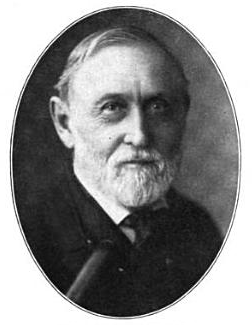
- J. W. McGarvey, c. 1904
- Born: March 1, 1829; Hopkinsville, Kentucky
- Died: October 6, 1911 (aged 82); Lexington, Kentucky
- Other name: J.W. McGarvey
- Occupations: minister; author; educator

John William (J. W.) McGarvey (March 1, 1829 – October 6, 1911) was a minister, author, and religious educator in the American Restoration Movement. He was particularly associated with the College of the Bible in Lexington, Kentucky (today Lexington Theological Seminary) where he taught for 46 years, serving as president from 1895 to 1911. He was noted for his opposition to theological liberalism and higher criticism. His writings are still influential among the heirs of the conservative wing of the Restoration Movement, the Churches of Christ and Christian churches and churches of Christ.

== Early Life ==
McGarvey was born in Hopkinsville, Kentucky, to John McGarvey, an Irish immigrant who was proprietor of a general store, and Sarah Ann Thomson. John McGarvey died when J.W. was four years old, and after a very few years his mother married Gurdon Flower Saltonstall, a doctor and hemp farmer. The McGarvey/Saltonstall family moved to Tremont, Illinois, in 1839. J.W. attended a private school there taught by James Kellogg. Tremont was heavily populated with transplanted New Englanders, including his Connecticut-bred teacher Kellogg, and was a broadening experience for young McGarvey.

McGarvey's religious upbringing was significant; his mother had been a student of the prominent Restoration Movement leader Barton W. Stone, and his stepfather left a portion of his inheritance to Alexander Campbell's Bethany College, with the interest to go toward the tuition of any of his sons that might attend. Still, young McGarvey was unsure of his salvation and questioned the teaching on the subject that he heard from local preachers.

== Bethany College ==
McGarvey attended Bethany College from 1847 to 1850, where he was taught by Alexander Campbell, W. K. Pendleton, and Robert Richardson. McGarvey was baptized by Pendleton in 1848. He was deeply impressed by his mentor's elderly father Thomas Campbell and attended devotional services in their home in addition to his regular classes and chapel assemblies. Though he was pursuing Classical studies and not ministry at Bethany, he determined to become a preacher if his speaking ability developed sufficiently by the time of his graduation.

McGarvey received top honors in his graduating class, and was asked to deliver the traditional commencement address in Greek—which he said "was the result of a vast amount of hunting for Greek words in textbooks, lexicons and the New Testament." Alexander Campbell's opinion of him is seen in the fact that Campbell tried on multiple occasions to hire McGarvey to the faculty of Bethany College, first as professor of mathematics, then some years later with a more tempting position as professor of ancient languages. McGarvey declined to take the position; after graduation he rejoined his family, by then in Fayette, Missouri, where he taught a boys' school while pursuing his own studies of the Bible.

== Early career ==
McGarvey went to his first preaching work, in Dover, Missouri, in January 1853. In March he married Atwayanna "Ottie" Francis Hix, whom he had met while living in Fayette. The couple would have eight children. His lifelong interest in Biblical criticism and translation was evidenced by the fact that he planned his honeymoon so as to be in Louisville, Kentucky, for a convention devoted to the planned English Revised translation of the Bible.

During his years at Dover, McGarvey became known to the wider religious community through debates with Presbyterian, Methodist, and Universalist ministers. He also began writing for Benjamin Franklin's American Christian Review and occasionally for Campbell's Millennial Harbinger. Encouraged by response to his articles, in 1861 he began composing one of his most influential works, the Commentary on Acts of the Apostles.

== Civil War ==
As the Civil War loomed nearer, McGarvey took a stand unpopular to both sides of the controversy. On a political level he was "against secession, and also against coercion," but on moral grounds he opposed Christian participation in armed conflict. The extreme partisanship in Missouri led to some of McGarvey's fellow preachers being imprisoned; in 1863 one Augustus Payne was even murdered, though the motivations remain unclear. Moses E. Lard, a prominent fellow leader of the Restoration Movement in Missouri, wrote to McGarvey confiding that he was afraid for his life and had greatly curtailed his travels; on McGarvey's advice he removed to Kentucky for the duration of the war. Though often "bitterly denounced by extreme partisans," McGarvey himself suffered nothing worse than censorship by the Missouri press.

McGarvey's attitude toward slavery and race relations is ambiguous. His stepfather Saltonsall moved the family from Missouri to Illinois because he "had become dissatisfied with rearing sons in a slave State." In 1845 (just before McGarvey's enrollment at Bethany College) his mentor Alexander Campbell published an influential series of articles on the slavery issue in which he declared himself opposed to slavery in principle, but desirous of a gradual emancipation and peaceful end to the institution. Central to the problem was this question: Does the New Testament's regulation of master-slave relationships legitimize the existence of the institution itself? He is known to have owned two slaves, given to him by his in-laws; McGarvey consistently referred to them as "servants."

The congregation at Dover, Missouri, had a large attendance of slaves at its regular services, where by custom of the day they were forced to sit in the balcony. McGarvey preached an additional service each month for the African-American community, at which this rule was not observed. On one occasion during the winter of 1860–1861, a group of whites that McGarvey describes as "rude fellows of a baser sort" tried to prevent the gathering, claiming danger of sedition. Other whites arrived and protested this interference with a lawful religious assembly. When one disputant punctuated his argument with a well-aimed snowball, McGarvey interposed himself between the two groups, fearing that the next volley might come from pistols. He persuaded the men to disperse, and continued with the service.

In 1862 McGarvey followed the advice he had given Lard and took refuge in Kentucky, where his political neutrality reflected the mood of the majority. He was offered the ministry at the Main Street Christian Church in Lexington, Kentucky, and moved to the city where he would spend the remainder of his career. He later noted that the Main Street congregation was one of the few churches in Lexington that survived the war without a division along political lines.

== College of the Bible ==
In 1865 Kentucky University (formerly Bacon College) merged with Transylvania University and the state Agricultural and Mechanical School to form a newly chartered Kentucky University in Lexington. The theology faculty was reconstituted as the College of the Bible, the first full-fledged seminary associated with the Restoration Movement (the institution became independent from the University of Kentucky again in 1877, and is today known as Lexington Theological Seminary).

McGarvey had been sought teaching positions at Bethany College and at Kentucky University, but declined to take any position that would interrupt his focus on the Bible. With the organization of the College of the Bible, however, he was offered the position of Professor of Sacred History. He would serve in this post almost without interruption for the remainder of his life. Up until the 1890s, the College of the Bible had only three full-time professors. The enrollment was quite small, and during its first incarnation (up until 1877) the College of the Bible graduated only 65 students. After reorganization it enrolled considerably more, with an average attendance of 150 during the 1890s.

=== Preaching and publishing activities ===
By 1867 the curriculum had expanded to the extent that McGarvey resigned his position with the Main Street church, though he continued to preach for various congregations on an appointment basis. When the Main Street Christian Church grew to the point of overflowing its meeting place, a second congregation was organized, the Broadway Christian Church. McGarvey preached for this group until it grew to the point of requiring a full-time minister, and maintained his membership there for decades.

Partly through gratitude for McGarvey's assistance in helping him find work in Kentucky during the war, Moses Lard requested McGarvey to be a regular contributor to a new religious publication, Lard's Quarterly. This journal contained, in McGarvey's later estimation, "some of the most admirable literature produced by the brotherhood," though it lasted through only five volumes (1863–1868). McGarvey's articles were sometimes written under the pseudonym "Kappa".

After the demise of Lard's Quarterly, Moses Lard assembled a larger editorial team including McGarvey for another new publication, Apostolic Times. After only three years, various circumstances left the paper in the hands of only McGarvey and one other editor. McGarvey contributed to this weekly publication for about seven years before his teaching and preaching duties caused him to withdraw. This publication included, in 1869–1870, his series of articles that later was published as A treatise on the eldership.

During the late 1870s McGarvey undertook one of his most ambitious projects. Lands of the Bible aimed at providing a more systematic survey of the Holy Lands than similar volumes had previously done. In his typically concentrated, systematic manner of working, he completed his research in the spring and summer of 1869 and published the work in 1870. He also issued a revision of his Commentary on the book of Acts.

=== The John Bryan Bowman affair ===
In 1873 the regent of the College of the Bible, John Bryan Bowman, fell under criticism for his handling of the institution's finances. McGarvey was accused of being an agitator in this situation, with the intent of removing Bowman from his position. Whatever his role in the initial controversy may have been, when called upon to explain his concerns about the management of the college finances, McGarvey's public statements led to an open breach with Bowman. A vote of the board of curators removed him from his professorship. The dispute cost the college a number of supporters and students, and may have contributed to its eventual collapse and reorganization.

Perhaps to counter the decline of the College of the Bible, the board reinstated McGarvey in 1875, but the college was unable to meet its financial obligations and was forced to reorganize in 1877. The newly constituted College of the Bible was independent of Kentucky University and the state university's component, the Agricultural and Mechanical College. (In 1878 the state-sponsored portion of Kentucky University again became independent; it later became the University of Kentucky. Because of the ensuing confusion over nomenclature, Kentucky University reverted to its historic name of Transylvania University in 1908. The independent College of the Bible took its current name, Lexington Theological Seminary, in 1965.)

Others within the Restoration Movement saw a different cause for the initial expulsion of McGarvey. Benjamin Franklin, a leading conservative, claimed that the entire affair was orchestrated by Bowman and others within the larger University who wanted to bring the College of the Bible more in line with the emerging views of skepticism and Liberal Christianity.

=== Controversy in final years ===
As the 19th century drew to a close, McGarvey witnessed increasing division within the Restoration Movement over specific interpretations of Scripture and over the hermeneutical approach as a whole. McGarvey held these tenets as essential to the Restoration plea: a belief in the plenary inspiration of the Bible, and a sola scriptura approach to Christian life, doctrine, and church polity. He accepted "lower criticism" (i.e., establishing the text of the Bible from the extant manuscript traditions) but rejected "higher criticism", which he saw as undermining the authority of the Bible and thus the foundations of Christian belief and practice.

In 1891 McGarvey completed his two-volume summation of his objections to the higher criticism, Evidences of Christianity. He also wrote a regular column on Biblical criticism for Christian Standard, a leading Restoration Movement journal; extracts from these columns led to the book Jesus and Jonah, published in 1896. In 1905 he published one of his most unusual works, The Four-Fold Gospel, a harmonization of Matthew, Mark, Luke, and John with running commentary. McGarvey also served as president of the College of the Bible beginning in 1895, remaining until his death in 1911.

Two significant flash points on specific interpretations of Scripture were the introduction of instrumental music into the previously a cappella worship services, and participation in para-church institutions such as missionary societies. McGarvey viewed the latter as a matter of expediency, but objected to the former as without New Testament authority. His 1864-65 exchange with Amos Sutton Hayden in the Millennial Harbinger was one of the earliest debates on this topic within the Restoration Movement (see List of Works). His later years were marked with disappointment when the leadership of McGarvey's long-time church home, the Broadway Christian Church in Lexington, informed him that they had decided to implement instrumental music in the worship. In 1903 he left for the Chestnut Street congregation. He died in Lexington, Kentucky, the scene of the majority of his work, in 1911.

== List of works ==
This list is an expansion on that compiled by Ernie Stefanik for Restoration Movement Texts, ed. Hans Rollmann, Memorial University of Newfoundland.

=== Commentaries and pedagogical materials ===
- A Commentary on Acts of Apostles: with a Revised Version of the Text.. Cincinnati: Wrightson, 1863. (Original published Lexington, KY: Transylvania Printing and Publishing, 1872.)
- New Testament Commentary: Vol. I--Matthew and Mark. Delight, AR: Gospel Light, 1875.
- Commentary on the Gospel of Mark. Cincinnati, OH: Central Book Concern, 1881.
- A Series of Fifty-Two Bible Lessons, for the Use of Intermediate and Advanced Classes in the Sunday School. Louisville, KY: Guide Printing and Publishing, 1889.
- New Commentary on Acts of Apostles. Cincinnati, OH: Standard Publishing Company, 1892.
- Class Notes on Sacred History, Vol. I: The Pentateuch, Joshua, Judges, Ruth and Job. 3rd ed. Lexington, KY: John Marcrom, 1893–1894.
- Class Notes on Sacred History, Vol. II: 1 Samuel to Nehemiah. 3rd ed. Lexington, KY: John Marcrom, 1893–1894.
- Class Notes on Sacred History, Vol. III: The Four Gospels. Revised ed. Bowling Green, KY: John Marcrom, 1893–1894.
- Class Notes on Sacred History, Vol. IV: Acts of the Apostles. Cincinnati, OH: Standard Publishing, 1893–1894.
- A Guide to Bible Study. Edited with introduction, notes, and appendix by Herbert L. Willett. Hand-book Series for the Bethany C. E. Reading Courses. Cleveland, OH: The Reading Committee, 1897.
- The Fourfold Gospel, or A Harmony of the Four Gospels. With Philip Y. Pendleton. Cincinnati, OH: Standard Publishing, 1914. Expanded electronic edition, 1997.
- Thessalonians, Corinthians, Galatians and Romans. With Philip Y. Pendleton. Standard Bible Commentary, v.3. Cincinnati, OH: Standard Publishing Company, 1916.

=== Topical books and tracts ===
- Letters to Bishop McIlvaine, on "Christian Union". New York: T. Holman, 1865.
- A Treatise on the Eldership. Lexington, KY(?), 1870. (Link is to a reprint published Murfreesboro, TN: DeHoff Publications, 1950.)
- Lands of the Bible: a Geographical and Topographical Description of Palestine, with Letters of Travel in Egypt, Syria, Asia Minor and Greece. Philadelphia, PA: J. B. Lippincott and Company, 1881.
- Evidences of Christianity. Cincinnati, OH: Guide Printing and Publishing Company, 1886.
- What Shall We Do about the Organ? With F. G. Allen. Louisville, KY: Guide Printing and Publishing, 1886. (Link is to reprint published Nashville, TN: McQuiddy Printing Company, 1903.)
- Jesus and Jonah. Cincinnati, OH: Standard Publishing Company, 1896.
- Baptism. Vest-Pocket Series Christian Tracts. Cincinnati, OH: Standard Publishing, 1900.
- Authorship of the Book of Deuteronomy, with its Bearings on the Higher Criticism of the Pentateuch. Cincinnati, OH: Standard Publishing Company, 1902.
- The Organ Question: a Visit to Texas. Unpublished MSS, 1903. (Held by Eastern Kentucky University.)
- Short Essays in Biblical Criticism Reprinted from columns in The Christian Standard, 1893–1904. Cincinnati, OH: Standard Publishing Company, 1910(?).
- The Autobiography of J. W. McGarvey (1829-1911). Edited with a foreword by De Loris Stevenson and Dwight E. Stevenson. Lexington, KY: The College of the Bible, 1960. (From McGarvey's unfinished notes ca. 1905-1906?)
- The Disciples of Christ. Cincinnati, OH: American Christian Missionary Society, ca. 1909.

=== Articles and contributions to larger works ===
- "Hymns and Hymn Books." Lard's Quarterly 1 (March 1864), pp. 319–329.
- "Instrumental Music in Churches," Millennial Harbinger 35/11 (November 1864), pp. 510–514. Response by Amos Sutton Hayden, 36/1 (January 1865), pp. 38–41. Response by McGarvey, 36/2 (February 1865), pp. 88–91. Second response by Hayden, 36/4 (April 1865), pp. 182–186. Second response by McGarvey, 36/4 (April 1865), pp. 186–188.
- "The Term 'Confession'," Millennial Harbinger 36/6 (June 1865), pp. 241–244.
- "The Witness of the Spirit." The Living Pulpit of the Christian Church: a Series of Discourses, Doctrinal and Practical. Ed. W. T. Moore. Cincinnati, OH: R. W. Carroll and Co., 1868. pp. 327–338.
- "Jewish Wars as Precedents for Modern Wars." Lard's Quarterly 5/2 (April 1868), pp. 113–126.
- "Review of 'W.' on Missionary Societies." Lard's Quarterly 5/2 (April 1868), pp. 194–200. Review of "W."'s article "Missionary Societies," Lard's Quarterly 5/1 (January 1868), pp. 32–52.
- "The Indwelling Spirit." Gems of Thought by J. H. Smart. St. Louis, MO: Christian Publishing Company, 1883. pp. 10–15.
- "Palestine Exploration, What Remains to be Done." The Old Testament Student 6/3 (1886), pp. 69–70.
- "A 'symposium' on Expository Preaching." The Old and New Testament Student 10/6 (1890), pp. 369–378.
- "Grounds on Which We Receive the Bible as the Word of God, and the Only Rule of Faith and Practice." The Old Faith Restated, Being a Restatement, by Representative Men, of the Fundamental Truths and Essential Doctrines of Christianity as Held and Advocated by the Disciples of Christ, in Light of Experience and of Biblical Research. Ed. J. H. Garrison. St. Louis, MO: Christian Publishing Company, 1891. pp. 11–48.
- "Credibility and inspiration of the New Testament." The Old and New Testament Student 13/3 (1891).
- "Broadway Christian Church: Historical Sketch." The Church Record. New York: Church Record Publishing Co., 1897. pp. 40–43.
- "Introduction." Churches of Christ: A Historical, Biographical, and Pictorial History of Churches of Christ in the United States, Australasia, England, and Canada. Ed. John T. Brown. Louisville, KY: John P. Morton and Company, 1904. Pp. ix-x.
- "The Prints of the Nails." On the Lord's Day: A Manual for the Regular Observance of the New Testament Ordinances. Ed. J. A. Lord Cincinnati, OH: Standard Publishing Company, 1904. pp. 41–43.
- "Introduction." That They All May Be One: A Century's Progress and Brief Historical Review of the Effort to Promote Christian Union and Restore New Testament Christianity, 1809-1909. Ed. T. J. Gore. Melbourne: Austral Publishing Company, 1909. Pp. ix-x.
- "Alexander Campbell, Barton W. Stone and Walter Scott." Centennial Convention Report. Ed. W. R. Warren. Cincinnati, OH: Standard Publishing Company, [1910]. pp. 381–384.

=== Sermons and addresses ===
- Dedicatory Sermon, Campbell Street Church of Christ, Louisville, KY. Lexington, KY: Transylvania Printing and Publishing, 1877.
- "Preachers' Methods." The Missouri Christian Lectures, Delivered at Independence, Mo., July 1883. St. Louis, MO: John Burns, 1883. pp. 83–112. With "Discussion on J. W. M'Garvey's Lectures" by A. Proctor, Isaac Errett, J. A. Dearborn, and W. S. Priest, pp. 112–116; "J. W. M'Garvey's Rejoinder," pp. 116–117.
- Coöperation in Mission Work: an Address Delivered by Prof. J. W. McGarvey before the Alabama Missionary Convention. Louisville, KY: Guide Printing and Publishing, 1891.
- "Church Government." The Missouri Christian Lectures, Selected from the Courses of 1889, 1890, and 1891. St. Louis, MO: Christian Publishing Company, 1892. pp. 188–209.
- Sermons, Delivered in Louisville, Kentucky, June-September, 1893. Louisville, KY: Guide Printing and Publishing, 1894.
- "Reminisence" in "The President's Address" by L. L. Carpenter. Centennial Convention Report. Ed. W. R. Warren. Cincinnati, OH: Standard Publishing Company, [1910]. pp. 319–321 [317-332].
- Chapel Talks, Delivered before the Student Body of the College of the Bible in 1910 and 1911. Lufkin TX: The Gospel Guardian Company, 1956.
