= Christian Messenger =

Historical religious magazine

- Editor: Barton W. Stone
- Categories: Restoration Movement
- Frequency: Monthly
- First issue: November 1826
- Final issue: April 1845
- Country: United States
- Based in: Georgetown, Kentucky (vols. 1-8); Jacksonville, Illinois (vols. 9-14)
- Language: English

The Christian Messenger was a religious magazine established by the early Restoration Movement leader Barton W. Stone in 1826. The paper was a key means of communication for the "Christians" led by Stone and a primary source of unity in the movement, but consistently struggled for survival. It also played a key role in promoting the merger of the "Christians" with the "Disciples" led by Thomas and Alexander Campbell.

== History ==
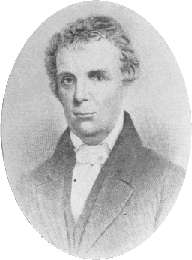
Barton W. Stone

From the beginning of the movement, the free exchange of ideas among the people was fostered by the journals published by its leaders. Alexander Campbell published the Christian Baptist and the Millennial Harbinger while Stone published the Christian Messenger. The first issue was printed in November 1826, and early themes included opposition to sectarianism, Christian liberty, and the right of individual Christians to read and interpret the Bible for themselves independently of any creeds. Stone also stressed the need for Christian unity based on the New Testament alone. The cornerstone for the Stone movement was Christian freedom, which led them to a rejection of all the historical creeds, traditions and theological systems that had developed over time and a focus on a primitive Christianity based on the Bible.

During the period from 1831 through 1834 the Messenger actively promoted the union with the Disciples of Christ (Campbell Movement). Stone also used the Messenger to encourage Christians to free their slaves and support the American Colonization Society.

The Messenger had several co-editors over the time it was published, including John T. Johnson, Jacob Creath Jr., T. M. Allen and D. P. Henderson. After Stone died Henderson continued the paper for a few months, after which it was merged with The Bible Advocate in 1847.
