= Campbellite =

Adherent of Restoration Movement religious groups

Campbellite is a mildly pejorative term referring to adherents of certain religious groups that have historic roots in the Restoration Movement, among whose most prominent 19th-century leaders were Thomas and Alexander Campbell.

== Influence of the Campbells ==
Thomas and Alexander Campbell were the most prominent leaders of the Disciples of Christ movement of the early 19th century. The group was committed to restoring primitive Christianity. It merged with the Christians (Stone Movement) in 1832 to form what is now described as the American Restoration Movement (also known as the Stone-Campbell Restoration Movement). Other prominent individuals in the Restoration Movement included Barton W. Stone, Walter Scott and "Raccoon" John Smith.

== Historically associated groups ==
Over time, strains grew within the Restoration Movement. In 1906, the U.S. Religious Census listed the Christian Churches and the Churches of Christ as separate and distinct groups for the first time. This, however, was simply the recognition of a division that had been growing for years, with published reports as early as 1883. The most obvious distinction between the two groups was the rejection of musical instruments in the Churches of Christ. The controversy over musical instruments began in 1860 with the introduction of organs in some churches. More basic were differences in the underlying approach to Biblical interpretation. For the Churches of Christ, any practices not present in accounts of New Testament worship were not permissible in the church, and they could find no New Testament documentation of the use of instrumental music in worship. For the Christian Churches, any practices not expressly forbidden could be considered. The major groups with historical roots in the movement are:

- The Churches of Christ
- The Christian Church (Disciples of Christ)
- The Independent Christian churches and churches of Christ

The term Campbellite is most often applied to the more conservative branches of the movement, including the Churches of Christ and the Christian churches and churches of Christ.

== Term ==
Members of these groups generally consider the term Campbellite inappropriate, saying that they are followers of Jesus, not Campbell. They draw parallels with Martin Luther's protest of the name Lutherans and the Anabaptists' protest of the name given to them by their enemies. With specific reference to the early Restoration Movement, "[t]he terms Campbellism and Campbellites were universally rejected by those to whom they were applied."

== Popular culture ==
A Campbellite family is featured in Chapter IX of MacKinlay Kantor's Pulitzer Prize-winning novel Andersonville (1955).
