= List of women of the Restoration Movement =

This is a list of notable women associated with the Restoration Movement (also known as the American Restoration Movement or the Stone-Campbell Movement).

- Sarah Shepherd Andrews
- Clara Babcock
- Sarah Bostick
- Selina Huntington Bakewell Campbell
- Jennie Everton Clarke
- Sarah Crank
- Lillie Cypert
- Hettie Ewing
- Clara Hazelrigg
- Silena Holman
- Emma Larimore
- Marinda Lemert
- Jessie Pounds
- Jessie Trout
