= American Christian Missionary Society =

The American Christian Missionary Society (ACMS) was the first missionary organization associated with the Restoration Movement.

== History ==
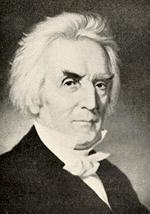
Alexander Campbell around 1855

Prior to the establishment of the American Christian Missionary Society (ACMS), Alexander Campbell had actively opposed missionary societies on the basis that they preempted the church's role in missions and served as a focus for division, insisting that the church itself should be the only missionary society. (Examples of such missionary societies were the American Board of Commissioners for Foreign Missions, American Missionary Association, American Home Mission Society, and the American Baptist Home Mission Society.) This opposition was reflected in his writings in the Christian Baptist. Over time, Campbell came to encourage greater cooperation between congregations and used his later journal the Millennial Harbinger to advance that view.

The ACMS was formed in October 1849. A representative was sent to Liberia in 1854 and to Jamaica in 1858, but for various reasons, both efforts were short-lived. Work in Jamaica and Liberia was later taken up by the Christian Woman's Board of Missions. The ACMS made a decision in 1863 to support the Union during the American Civil War. Controversy over that and other issues, coupled with the war's economic and social disruption, almost led to the collapse of the ACMS.

The ACMS recovered after the war and established a number of standing committees and service boards, including the Christian Women's Board of Missions in 1874, a planning committee for the Foreign Christian Missionary Society in 1874, a Committee on Church Extension in 1883, a Board of Negro Education and Evangelization in 1890, a Board of Education in 1894, and a Board of Temperance and Social Service in 1907.

The Foreign Christian Missionary Society expanded the number of overseas mission efforts during the 1880s. The ACMS was incorporated into the United Christian Missionary Society when it was formed in 1919.

== Impact on Restoration Movement ==
While there was no disagreement over the need for evangelism, many believed that missionary societies were not authorized by scripture and would compromise the autonomy of local congregations. That became an important factor leading to the separation of the Churches of Christ from the Christian Church (Disciples of Christ).
