= Mahoning Baptist Association =

Association

The Mahoning Baptist Association was an association of Baptist churches that was established in 1820 in Ohio's Mahoning Valley. Two prominent early Restoration Movement leaders, Alexander Campbell and Walter Scott, were closely affiliated with the Mahoning Association. The Association was dissolved in 1830.

== History ==
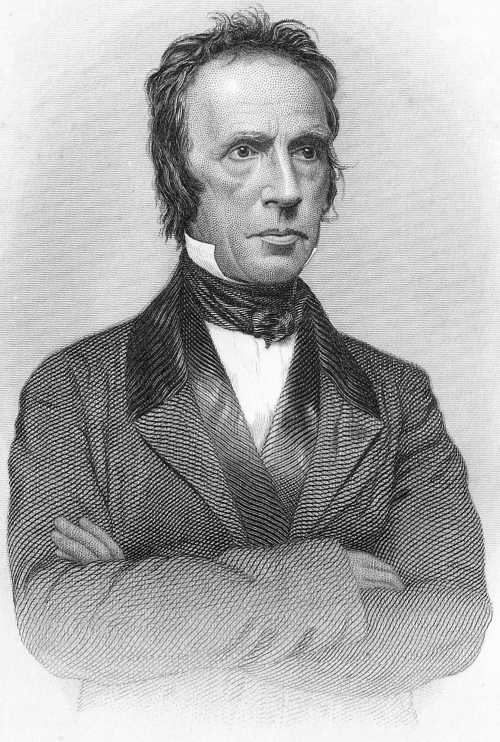
Walter Scott

The Mahoning Baptist Association was established in 1820. Even though the Philadelphia Confession of Faith was considered its "organic law," the Association was "filled with ideas of religious reformation" and both open discussion and doctrinal diversity were accepted.

A congregation in Wellsburg, West Virginia, which was formed by Alexander Campbell after he left the Brush Run Church and the Redstone Baptist Association, became a member of the Association in 1823. Campbell's journal the Christian Baptist was well received in the Association, as were his debates. As a result, "the association heartily adopted the very same ecumenical, reforming views" in 1824 that had led to Campell's break with the Redstone Association.

Another early Restoration Movement leader, Walter Scott, was hired by the Mahoning Association as an evangelist in 1827. Within three years he brought more than 3,000 converts into the movement.

The Association disbanded in 1830, which Campbell believed to be premature. Some historians consider the dissolution of the Mahoning Association to mark the beginning of the Disciples of Christ, because that is the point when they became truly independent.
