= Robert Richardson (religion) =

Robert Richardson

Dr. Robert Richardson (1806 – 1876) was an American medical doctor who spent much of his life teaching and working as an administrator at Bethany College. He served as family physician for Alexander Campbell, noted Restoration Movement pioneer, for well over 30 years. He was also associate editor for Campbell's Millennial Harbinger magazine for nearly 30 years.

== Contribution to the Restoration Movement ==
In the early 1840s Richardson spoke out against what he felt to be the Restoration Movement's mistaken focus on doctrines and theories. Richardson felt the movement relied heavily upon a system that trusted, “belief in correct intellectual views...; as respect to the mind rather than to the heart.”

Richardson attributed this development, in large measure, to the influence of John Locke's philosophy. Locke taught that true knowledge was gained through the five senses and that human reason must be our last judge and guide in everything.

Richardson labeled the popular philosophy as dirt philosophy. He called it that because of its insistence that God could influence human beings only through material objects or through revealed words^{1}.
