= The British Millennial Harbinger =

- Editor: James Wallis
- Categories: Restoration Movement
- First issue: 1837
- Language: English

The British Millennial Harbinger was a religious magazine established by the early Restoration Movement leader James Wallis in 1837. Wallis was a member of a group in Nottingham that withdrew from the Scotch Baptist church in 1836 to form a Church of Christ. It was originally named The Christian Messenger and Reformer, then The Christian Messenger and Family Magazine. Wallis officially named the magazine The British Millennial Harbinger in 1848. His successor from 1861, David King, changed the name to the British Harbinger in 1866, then to the Ecclesiastical Observer 1871-1889.

== See also ==
- Millennial Harbinger (U.S.)
