= William Robinson (theologian) =

British theologian, born 1886

William Robinson (1886–1963) was a British theologian within the Stone-Campbell movement (Christian Churches and Disciples of Christ).

== Education ==
Robinson received his Masters of Arts from Trinity College Dublin.

== Academic career ==
Robinson was a professor at Selly Oaks College.

== Theological beliefs ==
Robinson advocated many of the ecumenical implications of the work of Thomas Campbell's Declaration and Address in his works such as What the Churches of Christ Stand For and his Essays on Christian Unity. He was an active member of various ecumenical efforts in the middle of the 20th century such as the Faith and Order Movement and the World Council of Churches. He rejected the idea that the New Testament has an ahistorical law code for the church to replicate and placed greater importance on the development of the church through history as an essential part of organic unity of the church. He held to a sacramental view of Baptism and the Eucharist (communion), rejecting the Zwinglian views held by some earlier preachers and theologians in the movement. Robinson believed that unity was not simply organization coherence, but a connection to the singular people of God through the history of the church.

Because Robinson believed that this unity meant a connection to the historical church and because of his sacramental views on the church and Christian worship, Robinson is seen as a theologian that represents the free church/high church position, or what many have called "free church catholicism". His book, The Biblical Doctrine of the Church, articulates his ecclesiology and his understanding of Christian unity. He writes from within the framework purposed by Thomas Campbell, but with an increased emphasis on the church as the embodied (or incarnational) work of God in history.
