= Marinda Lemert =

Marinda R. Lemert
- Born: March 4, 1811; Ohio, U.S.
- Died: September 29, 1891 (aged 80); Seattle, Washington, U.S.
- Occupation: writer

Marinda R. Lemert (4 March 1811 – 29 September 1891) was a 19th-century American religious writer, associated with the Restoration Movement. Lemert was an early proponent for the expanded role of women in the church within the Disciples of Christ.

A regular contributor to the Apostolic Guide, Marinda's writings focused on evangelism and the ordination of women. Her writings were also critical of the inadequate financial support for missions, and she referred to the American Christian Review as an "anti-missionary" publication. Lemert's writing caused R.B. Neal, editor of the Gospel Advocate, to note the controversial nature of her writings. Neal wrote, "She is indeed and in truth without a peer among the sisters of this Restoration as a Polemic."

Lemert devoted the final years of her life to composing theological arguments supporting the ordination of women. Writing in the Apostolic Guide in 1888, she argued, "The doctrine that seals woman's lips in the church assembled...is a heresy...It impeaches the wisdom of God."
