= Disciples of Christ (Campbell Movement) =

19th-century American Christian restorative group

The Disciples of Christ (Campbell Movement) were a group arising during the Second Great Awakening of the early 19th century. The most prominent leaders were Thomas and Alexander Campbell. The group was committed to restoring primitive Christianity. It merged with the Christians (Stone Movement) in 1832 to form what is now described as the American Restoration Movement (also known as the Stone–Campbell Restoration Movement).

== History ==
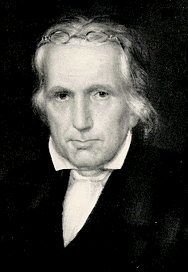
Thomas Campbell

The Campbell wing of the American Restoration Movement was launched when Thomas Campbell published the Declaration and Address of the Christian Association of Washington in 1809. The Presbyterian Synod had suspended his ministerial credentials. In The Declaration and Address he set forth some of his convictions about the church of Jesus Christ, as he organized the Christian Association of Washington, in Washington County, Pennsylvania, not as a church but as an association of persons seeking to grow in faith. On May 4, 1811, the Christian Association constituted itself as a congregationally governed church. With the building it constructed at Brush Run, Pennsylvania, it became known as Brush Run Church. When their study of the New Testament led the reformers to begin to practice baptism by immersion, the nearby Redstone Baptist Association invited Brush Run Church to join with them for the purpose of fellowship. The reformers agreed, provided that they would be "allowed to preach and to teach whatever they learned from the Scriptures."

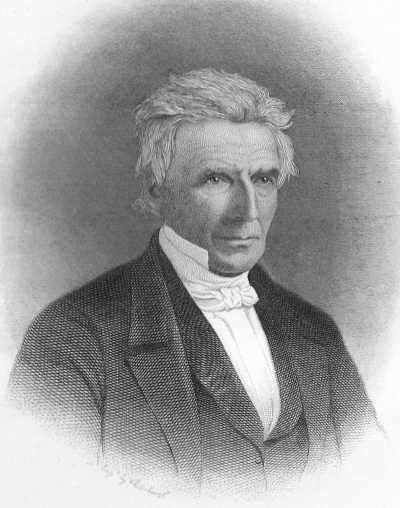
Alexander Campbell

Thomas' son Alexander immigrated to the US to join him in 1809, and before long assumed the leading role in the movement.

The Campbells worked within the Redstone Baptist Association during the period 1815 through 1824. While both the Campbells and the Baptists shared practices of baptism by immersion and congregational polity, it was soon clear that he and his associates were not traditional Baptists. Within the Redstone Association, some of the Baptist leaders considered the differences intolerable when Alexander Campbell began publishing a journal, The Christian Baptist, which promoted reform. Campbell anticipated the conflict and moved his membership to a congregation of the Mahoning Baptist Association in 1824.

Alexander used The Christian Baptist to address what he saw as the key issue of reconstructing the apostolic Christian community in a systematic and rational manner. He wanted to clearly distinguish between essential and non-essential aspects of primitive Christianity. Among what he identified as essential were "congregational autonomy, a plurality of elders in each congregation, weekly communion and immersion for the remission of sins." Among practices he rejected as non-essential were "the holy kiss, deaconesses, communal living, footwashing and charismatic exercises."

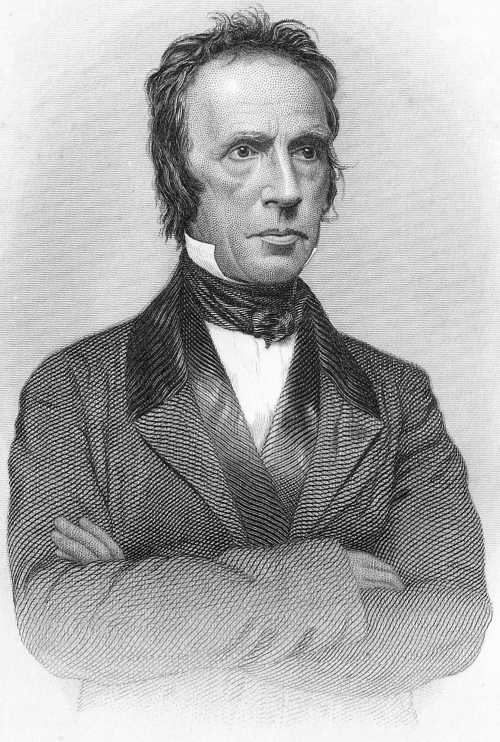
Walter Scott

In 1827, the Mahoning Association appointed Walter Scott as an evangelist. Through Scott's efforts, the Mahoning Association grew rapidly. In 1828, Thomas Campbell visited several of the congregations formed by Scott and heard him preach. Campbell believed that Scott was bringing an important new dimension to the movement with his approach to evangelism.

Several Baptist associations began disassociating congregations that refused to subscribe to the Philadelphia Confession. The Mahoning Association came under attack. In 1830, The Mahoning Baptist Association disbanded. The younger Campbell ceased publication of the Christian Baptist. In January 1831, he began publication of the Millennial Harbinger.

== Influence of the Enlightenment ==
John Locke
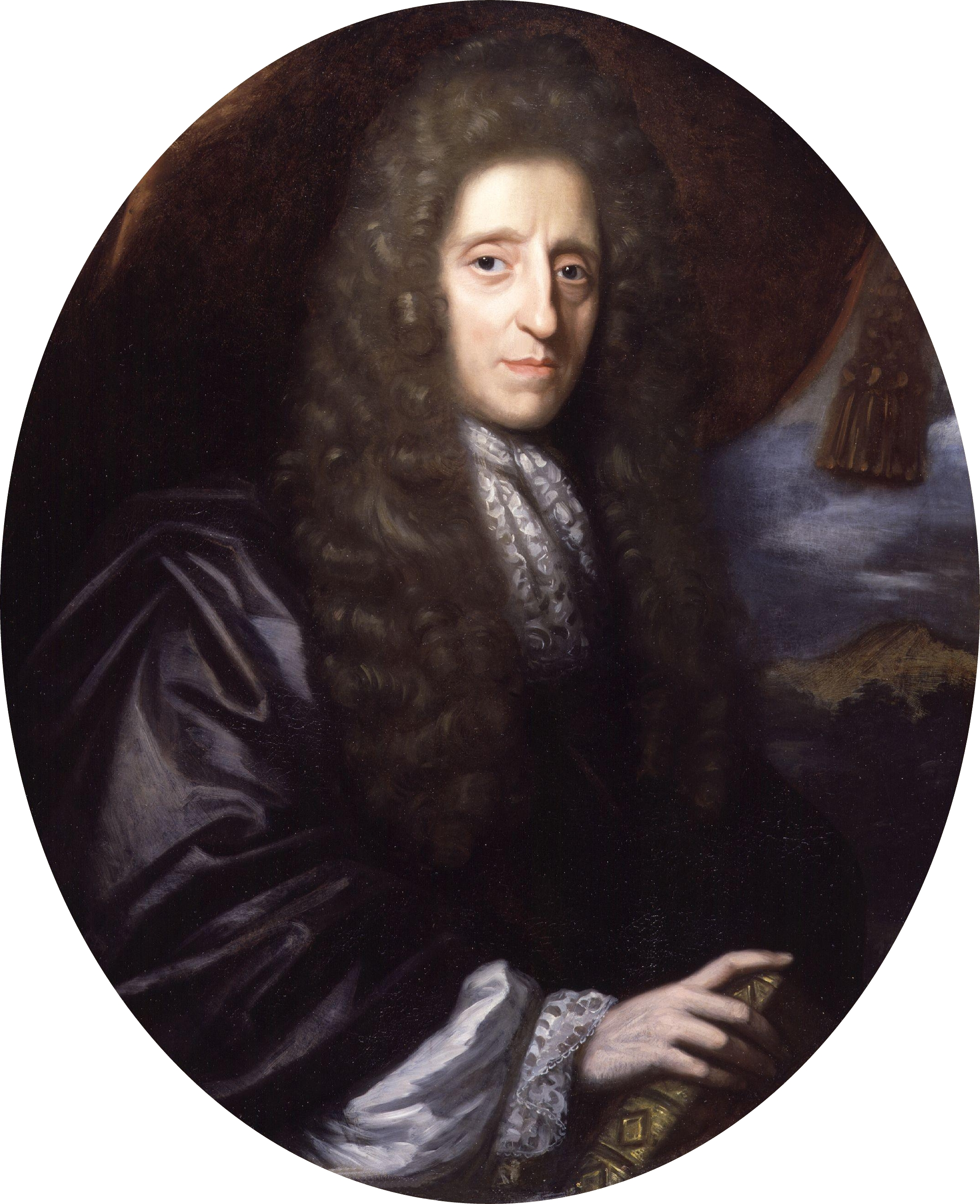
- Artist: Herman Verelst
- Year: 1689
- Medium: Oil on canvas
- Dimensions: 90.2 cm × 75.6 cm (35.5 in × 29.8 in)
- Location: National Portrait Gallery, London

The Age of Enlightenment had a significant influence on the Campbell movement. Thomas Campbell was a student of the Enlightenment philosopher John Locke. While he did not explicitly use the term "essentials," in the Declaration and Address, Campbell proposed the same solution to religious division as had been advanced earlier by Herbert and Locke: "[R]educe religion to a set of essentials upon which all reasonable persons might agree." The essentials he identified were those practices for which the Bible provided "a 'Thus saith the Lord,' either in express terms or by approved precedent." Unlike Locke, who saw the earlier efforts by Puritans as inherently divisive, Campbell argued for "a complete restoration of apostolic Christianity." Thomas believed that creeds served to divide Christians. He also believed that the Bible was clear enough that anyone could understand it and, thus, creeds were unnecessary.

Alexander Campbell was also deeply influenced by Enlightenment thinking, in particular the Scottish School of Common Sense of Thomas Reid and Dugald Stewart. This group saw the Bible as providing concrete facts rather than abstract truths, and advocated a scientific or Baconian approach to interpreting the Bible that would begin with those facts, arrange the ones applicable to a given topic, and then use them to draw conclusions. Alexander Campbell reflected this approach, when arguing that "the Bible is a book of facts, not of opinions, theories, abstract generalities, nor of verbal definitions." He believed that if Christians would limit themselves to the facts found in the Bible, they would necessarily come to agreement. He saw those facts as providing a blueprint or constitution for the church.

== Characteristics of the movement ==
Thomas Campbell combined the Enlightenment approach to unity with the Reformed and Puritan traditions of restoration. The Enlightenment affected the Campbell movement in two ways. First, it provided the idea that Christian unity could be achieved by finding a set of essentials that all reasonable people could agree on. The second was the concept of a rational faith that was formulated and defended on the basis of a set of facts derived from the Bible.

Alexander Campbell's millennialism was more optimistic than Stone's. He had more confidence in the potential for human progress and believed that Christians could unite to transform the world and initiate a millennial age. Campbell's conceptions were postmillennial, as he anticipated that the progress of the church and society would lead to an age of peace and righteousness before the return of Christ. This optimistic approach meant that, in addition to his commitment to primitivism, he had a progressive strand in his thinking.

Those following the Campbells were called "Reforming Baptists" because of the associations with the Baptist at the beginning of the movement; this was sometimes shortened to "Reformers." "Disciples" was the name Alexander Campbell preferred. Opponents of the movement nicknamed them "Campbellites."

== Merger with the Christians (Stone Movement) ==
"Raccoon" John Smith

The Campbell movement was characterized by a "systematic and rational reconstruction" of the early church, in contrast to the Stone movement which was characterized by radical freedom and lack of dogma. Despite their differences, the two movements agreed on several critical issues. Both saw restoring apostolic Christianity as a means of hastening the millennium. Both also saw restoring the early church as a route to Christian freedom. And, both believed that unity among Christians could be achieved by using apostolic Christianity as a model. The commitment of both movements to restoring the early church and to uniting Christians was enough to motivate a union between many in the two movements.

The Stone and Campbell movements merged in 1832. This was formalized at the High Street Meeting House in Lexington, Kentucky with a handshake between Barton W. Stone and "Raccoon" John Smith. Smith had been chosen, by those present, to speak in behalf of the followers of the Campbells. A preliminary meeting of the two groups was held in late December 1831, culminating with the merger on January 1, 1832.

Two representatives of those assembled were appointed to carry the news of the union to all the churches: John Rogers, for the Christians and "Raccoon" John Smith for the reformers. Despite some challenges, the merger succeeded. Many believed the union held great promise for the future success of the combined movement, and greeted the news enthusiastically.

With the merger, there was the challenge of what to call the new movement. Clearly, finding a Biblical, non-sectarian name was important. Stone wanted to continue to use the name "Christians." Alexander Campbell insisted upon "Disciples of Christ". As a result, both names were used. The confusion over names has been present ever since.

== See also ==
- Jessie Trout
