= Barton W. Stone =

American evangelist (1772–1844)

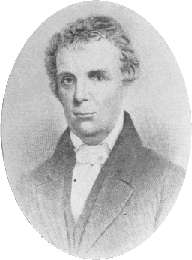
- Barton W. Stone
- Born: Barton Warren Stone; December 24, 1772; Port Tobacco, Province of Maryland, British America
- Died: November 9, 1844 (aged 71); Hannibal, Missouri, United States
- Resting place: Cane Ridge, Kentucky, United States
- Occupation: Evangelist/preacher
- Years active: 1803–1844
- Known for: Leadership in the Restoration Movement

Barton Warren Stone (December 24, 1772 – November 9, 1844) was an American evangelist during the early 19th-century Second Great Awakening in the United States. First ordained a Presbyterian minister, he and four other ministers of the Washington Presbytery resigned after arguments about doctrine and enforcement of policy by the Kentucky Synod. This was in 1803 after Stone had helped lead the Cane Ridge Revival, a several-day communion season attended by nearly 20,000 persons.

Stone and the others briefly founded the Springfield Presbytery, which they dissolved the following year, resigning from the Presbyterian Church altogether. They formed what they called the Christian Church, based on Christian scriptures rather than a creed. He later became allied with Alexander Campbell, a former Presbyterian minister who was also creating an independent sect, sometimes allied with Baptists, and formed the Restoration Movement. Stone's followers were first called "New Lights" and "Stoneites". Later, he and Campbell brought the groups together, which relied solely on the Christian Bible.

Several church groups have historical roots in Stone's efforts. The three main groups are the Churches of Christ, the Christian Church (Disciples of Christ), and the independent Christian churches and churches of Christ. Additionally, there are the International Churches of Christ, the International Christian Church, the Churches of Christ in Australia, the Churches of Christ in Europe, and the Evangelical Christian Church in Canada.

== Early life and education ==
Stone was born to John and Mary Warren Stone near Port Tobacco on December 24, 1772. His immediate family was upper-middle class, with connections to Maryland's upper class of planters. The first Protestant governor of Maryland, William Stone, was an ancestor; one of the signers of the United States Declaration of Independence, Thomas Stone, was his second cousin.

Mary Stone was a member of the Church of England, and Barton had been christened by a priest named Thomas Thornton. After Barton's father died in 1775, his mother moved the family to Pittsylvania County, Virginia, in 1779, then on the frontier. After the move to the Virginia frontier during the war, Mary joined the Methodists. Barton was not himself religious as a young man: he found the competing claims of the Episcopalians, Baptists, and Methodists confusing, and was much more interested in politics.

Barton entered the Caldwell Log College in Greensboro, North Carolina, in 1790. While there, Stone heard James McGready (an evangelical Presbyterian minister) speak. A few years later, he was ordained as a Presbyterian minister.

== Career ==
As Stone looked more deeply into the beliefs of the Presbyterians, especially the Westminster Confession of Faith, he doubted that some of the denomination's beliefs were grounded in the Christian Bible. He was unable to accept the Calvinist doctrines of total depravity, unconditional election, and predestination. He also believed that "Calvinism's alleged theological sophistication had . . . been bought at the price of fomenting division" and "blamed it . . . for producing ten different sects within the Presbyterian tradition alone."

The Cane Ridge Revival of 1801 was "set up as a traditional Presbyterian 'sacramental occasion'," similar to the one Stone attended earlier that year in Logan County—later called the Revival of 1800. Like its predecessor, the Cane Ridge Revival continued for two to three days. It attracted an estimated 20,000 people, and Stone was one of eighteen Presbyterian ministers, along with a number of Baptist and Methodist preachers, who preached to the participants. Elements traditional to this form Christian revivalism included the "large number of ministers, the action sermon, the tables, the tent, the successive servings" of communion—all part of the evangelical Presbyterian tradition and "communion season" known in Scotland.

In 1803, Stone and four other ministers formed the Springfield Presbytery after disagreeing with the Kentucky Synod's decision to censure a minister for deviating from the Westminster Confession of Faith. By 1804, the Springfield Presbytery had attracted 15 congregations in Ohio and Kentucky. The leaders of the new presbytery became concerned by its growth because they did not want to create a new denomination or "party" within Presbyterianism. Ultimately convinced that their newer Springfield Presbytery was sectarian, the ministers dissolved it on June 28, 1804.

To publicize the dissolution, they signed a document entitled The Last Will and Testament of the Springfield Presbytery. The tract willed that "this body die, be dissolved, and sink into union with the Body of Christ at large." It expressed a desire for Christian unity and identified the Christian Bible as its standard. In addition to signing the Last Will and Testament, they agreed to take "no other name than christians [sic]" on the basis that it was "the name first given by divine authority to the disciples of Christ." Soon, they adopted the name "Christian" to identify their group. Thus, remnants from the Springfield Presbytery became known as the Christian Church. It is estimated that the Christian Church numbered about 12,000 by 1830.

Elias Smith had heard of the Stone movement by 1804 and the O'Kelly movement by 1808. The three groups "declared themselves one" by 1810. At that time the combined movement had a membership of approximately 20,000. This loose fellowship of churches was called by the names "Christian Connection/Connexion" or "Christian Church."

In 1819, Stone moved with his family to Georgetown, Kentucky, where he had been hired as principal of the Rittenhouse Academy, which became Georgetown College in 1829. In 1834, the Stones moved to Jacksonville, Illinois, in part to be able to free slaves whom his wife had inherited. This was not possible in Kentucky because they were attached to the estate. His mother-in-law's will bequeathed the slaves to his wife and her children in perpetuity in a way that placed them under the control of trustees. Moving to a free state allowed the Stones to emancipate them. Stone was a proponent of abolition and an active supporter of the American Colonization Society, which promoted sending free blacks to a colony in Africa—this was the basis of Liberia. By 1833, Stone had become disillusioned by the lack of success of the colonization efforts and began to support the immediate abolition of slavery.

The "Christian" movement associated with Stone merged with the "Disciples" movement led by Alexander Campbell in 1832. This was formalized at the High Street Meeting House in Lexington, Kentucky, with a handshake between Barton W. Stone and John Smith. Smith had been chosen, by those present, to speak on behalf of the followers of the Campbells. A preliminary meeting of the two groups was held in late December 1831, culminating with the merger on January 1, 1832. Campbell had been publishing the Christian Baptist since 1823, and Stone the Christian Messenger since 1826. They intended to bring their followers together under Jesus with their publications.

When the Christians and Disciples united in 1832, only a minority of Christians from the Smith/Jones and O'Kelly movements participated. Those who did were from congregations on the frontier, west of the Appalachian Mountains, that had come into contact with the Stone movement. The eastern members had several key differences from the Stone and Campbell group: an emphasis on a conversion experience, quarterly observance of communion, and nontrinitarianism.

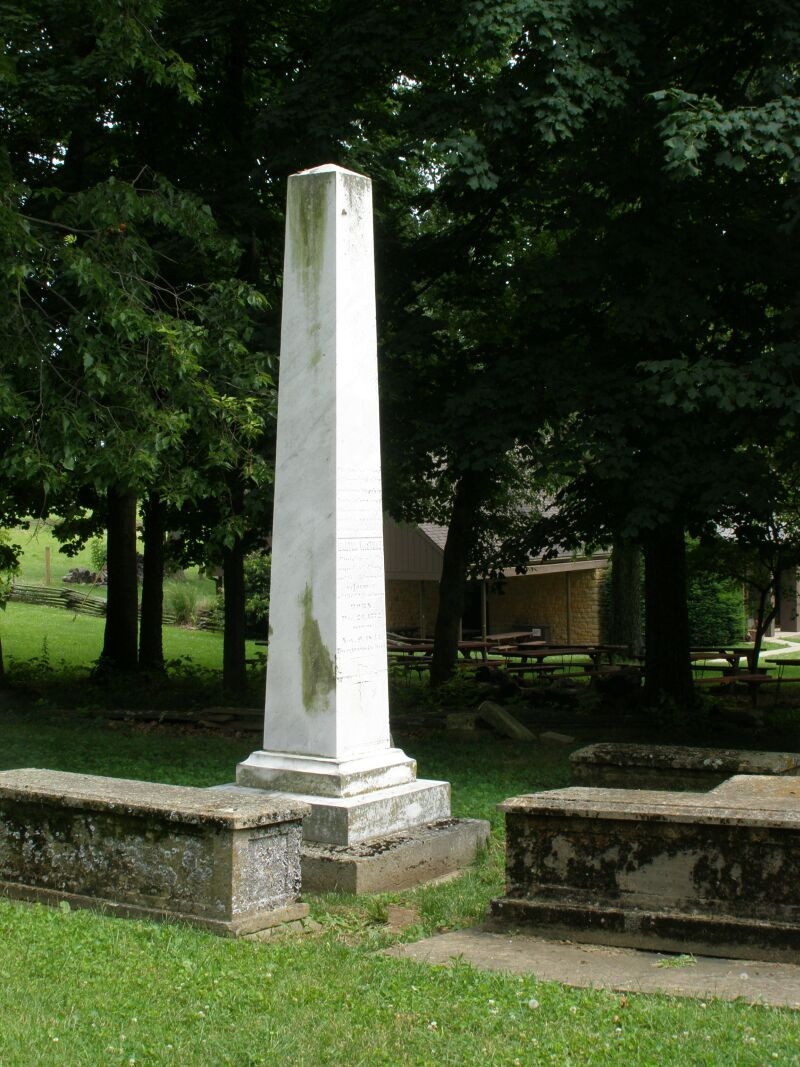
Grave and obelisk of Barton Stone at Cane Ridge, Kentucky

Stone died on November 9, 1844, in Hannibal, Missouri, at the home of his daughter. His body was buried on his farm in Morgan County, Illinois. When the farm was sold, descendants had his remains reinterred at Antioch Christian Church, east of Jacksonville. In 1847, his remains were moved again and reinterred at Cane Ridge, Kentucky.

A marble obelisk there is inscribed:

The church of Christ at Cane Ridge and other generous friends in Kentucky have caused this monument to be erected as a tribute of affection and gratitude to Barton W. Stone, minister of the gospel of Christ and the distinguished reformer of the nineteenth century. Born December 24, 1772: died November 9, 1844. His remains lie here. This monument erected in 1847.

== Theological controversy ==
Stone was ordained as a Presbyterian pastor but rejected components of the Westminster Confession of Faith. In particular, he had issues with the classical view of the Trinity. He denied being a Unitarian, Arian, or Socinian, but he did hold a subordinationist view of Jesus. In addition to his issues with the Trinity, he also took issue with the prevailing understanding of atonement in Christianity. He did not believe that Jesus died in humankind's place as a substitutionary sacrifice; his views are more in line with the moral influence theory of atonement of Charles Finney.

Stone outlined his views on the Trinity in a publication entitled An Address to the Christian Churches in Kentucky, Tennessee & Ohio on Several Important Doctrines of Religion.

The doctrine of Trinity has long been a subject of endless controversy among theologists. I have thought the contest a war of words, while the combatants believed the same thing; seeing they all maintain the divine unity. On this doctrine many things are said, which are dark, unintelligible, unscriptural, and too mysterious for comprehension. Many of these expressions we have rejected; and for this reason we are charged with denying the doctrine itself. I shall state the doctrine, as generally stated and defended by our brethren, who oppose us, and give my reasons why I cannot receive it.

It is commonly stated, that there are three persons in one God, of one substance, power and eternity. To me it is evident that they, who maintain this proposition, do not—cannot believe, that these three persons are three distinct spirits, beings or Gods, each possessed of the personal properties of intelligence, will and power; for this would not only contradict the scriptures, but also those sections of their creeds just quoted, which declare that there is but one only living and true God, without parts. They must understand the term persons in God, not in the proper and common sense of the word person; but in such a qualified sense as to exclude the notion of three distinct spirits or beings. What this qualified sense should be, has long puzzled divines; and in no proposition are they more divided. The cause of this perplexity is obvious, because no idea of it is to be found in revelation, nor reason. Revelation no where declares that there are three persons of the same substance in the one only God; and it is universally acknowledged to be above reason.—Imagination has been set afloat, taking different courses in different men, and wandering through the unknown fields of eternity, infinity and incomprehensibility. Their labors have been great; but after all their vast excursions, they have ended in mystery. ...

The doctrine, that there are three persons in one God, is principally founded on I John 5, 7. "There are three that bear record in heaven, the Father, the Word and the Holy Ghost, and these three are one." From reading the context, it is plain, that the matter testified of, is that Jesus is the son of God. The Father testified this, when he spake from heaven, "This is my beloved Son, hear ye him." The Word or Son, testified the same by the many wonders he performed when incarnate. This also the Holy Ghost witnessed by the many miracles wrought thro' the apostles. These three are one. They are one, or agree in their testimony; as, in the next verse, the three witnesses on earth agree in one. To say these three are one God, would contradict the original; for the word hen, translated one, is in the neuter gender, and cannot agree with the word God. ... Now as all believers are not one substance nor one being; and as they are all one, even as the Father and Son are one; we must then conclude, that the Father and Son are not one substance, nor one being. This is farther evident from John 10, 30, "I and my Father are (hen) one," says Jesus. Yet in the same Evangelist he said, "My Father is greater than I." John 14, 28. If they were one substance, or one being, there could be no comparison; as one cannot be greater or less than itself. The fact is, all believers are one in spirit, purpose, and mind—and this is the oneness which our Lord prayed they might have--this was the oneness of Paul and Apollos.—This appears to me to be the oneness of the Father and the Son.

... That the scriptures speak of the Father, Son and Holy Spirit, is believed and admitted by christians of every name; and that these three are one in some sense, I think, none will deny. My view of this oneness I have expressed a few pages back. If they are one in any other sense, I shall rejoice to know it.

== Charles Chilton Moore ==
Stone's grandson, Charles Chilton Moore, initially became a preacher in the tradition of his father and grandfather, but he later became one of America's most famous atheists and founded the Blue Grass Blade, a newspaper which he used to promote atheism and criticise religion.

== Legacy and honors ==
- In 1847, a monument was erected in Stone's honor at his gravesite in Cane Ridge, Kentucky
- Barton College (formerly Atlantic Christian College) in Wilson, North Carolina was named in his honor.
