= Clara Babcock =

Clara Celestia Hale Babcock (31 May 1850 – 12 December 1924) was one of the first women preachers to be ordained within the Restoration Movement, and was a leader within the Woman's Christian Temperance Union (WCTU).

== Biography ==
Clara Celestia Hale was born on May 31, 1850, in Fitchville, Ohio. She married Israel Babcock in 1865. Formerly members of the Methodist Church, the Babcocks joined the Stone-Campbell Movement in 1880 at the Sterling Christian Church in Sterling, Illinois.

Babcock was also active in local temperance movements and served as a leader in the WCTU, becoming president of the Whiteside County union in Whiteside, Illinois, in 1887.

Following a speaking engagement that was likely on behalf of the WCTU at an Erie, Illinois, church in 1888, the congregation urged Babcock to be their minister.

She was ordained by Andrew Scott of the Sterling Christian Church in 1889. Babcock participated in twenty-eight annual revivals and served as a pastor at churches throughout Illinois, Iowa, and North Dakota.

Prior to her death in 1924, Babcock served as a pastor in Savanna, Illinois.
