= Amos Sutton Hayden =

American Restoration Movement preacher, hymn composer, writer, and educator

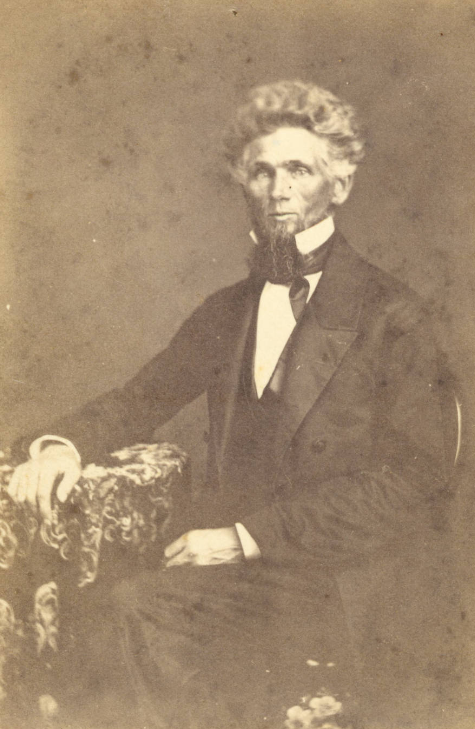
Portrait of Amos Sutton Hayden

Amos Sutton Hayden (September 17, 1813 in Youngstown, Ohio – September 10, 1880) was an American Restoration Movement preacher, hymn composer, writer, and educator. He wrote the Early History of the Disciples in the Western Reserve, Ohio in 1875. He was a founder and the first principal of Hiram College in Hiram, Ohio.
