= Walter Scott (clergyman) =

Scottish evangelist (1796–1861)

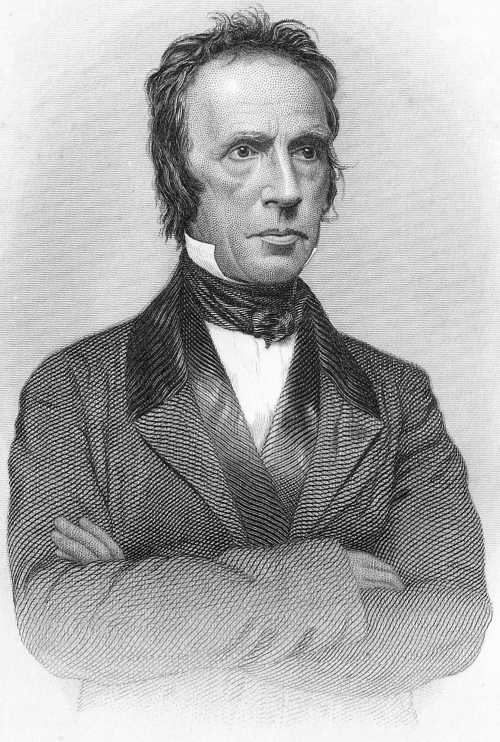
Walter Scott

Walter Scott (1796 – April 23, 1861) was one of the four key early leaders in the Restoration Movement, along with Barton W. Stone, Thomas Campbell and Thomas' son Alexander Campbell. He was a successful evangelist and helped to stabilize the Campbell movement as it was separating from the Baptists.

== Biography ==
Walter was born to John and Mary Innes Scott in 1796 in the town of Moffatt, Scotland. His parents, who were members of the Church of Scotland, hoped that he would become a Presbyterian minister. He spent six years at the University of Edinburgh, leaving in 1818. The same year he went to New York City at the invitation of his maternal uncle, where he taught languages at a school on Long Island. He soon moved to Pittsburgh, where he was baptized by immersion and became an active member of a small congregation led by a fellow Scotsman named George Forrester. Forrester helped shape Walter's understanding of Christianity, and in particular his belief that immersion was the only appropriate form of baptism.

The congregation in Pittsburgh influenced by the movement led by James and Robert Haldane. The Haldanes, who hoped to restore New Testament Christianity, rejected the authority of creeds, observed the Lord's Supper weekly, practiced foot washing and by 1809 practiced believer's baptism by immersion rather than infant baptism. Forrester also introduced Scott to the writings of John Glas and Robert Sandeman. When Forrester died in 1820, Scott replaced him as minister and as director of a small school.

Scott married Sarah Whitsette in 1823, and the family moved to Ohio in 1826 He began working with the Campbells in August of that year. He was hired to work as an evangelist in 1827. Within three years he brought over 3,000 converts into the movement. At that time the Campbells were associated with the Mahoning Baptist Association; as the number of converts grew, conflicts with other Baptists also grew. In 1839 Scott and the Campbells disassociated themselves from the Baptists.

Scott continued to preach after 1829, but increasingly his focus shifted to writing. In 1852 the family moved to Covington, Kentucky where he established a school for women. He died on April 23, 1861.

== Writings ==
Scott's written work, most of which dates from after 1830, influenced the Restoration Movement throughout the 19th century. Scott founded two periodicals: The Evangelist in 1832, and The Protestant Unionist in 1844. As a journalist, he wrote about a wide range of topics, including church music, issues important to the Restoration Movement and also more general domestic and foreign news.

His work has been described as "profoundly theological." Influenced by Francis Bacon and John Locke, Scott believed theology should be reasonable, able to be explained in reasonable terms and able to withstand reasonable criticism. His first book, A Discourse on the Holy Spirit, was published in 1831. Scott understood the Holy Spirit to work through the Biblical inspiration and the church; fundamentally, he saw the Spirit working externally through scripture and teaching to convert sinners, rather than through an internal experience or operation. Scott believed that before repentance and baptism the Spirit works externally by bringing to individuals the evidence of scripture and preaching concerning the acts of God, and that the individual then evaluates that evidence and rationally decides to respond in faith. His most important written work was The Gospel Restored, which was published in 1836. In it he outlined a six-phased covenantal understanding of salvation, with three phases taken by the individual and three by God. The three phases taken by the individual were faith, repentance and baptism; the three phases provided by God were remission of sins, the gift of the Holy Spirit and eternal life.

Other works include:

- To Themelion: The Union of Christians (1852)
- Nekrosis, or the Death of Christ (1853)
- The Messiahship, or the Great Demonstration (1859)

== Five-Finger Exercise ==
While working as an evangelist for the Mahoning Baptist Association between 1827 and 1830, Scott developed a simple mnemonic illustration for the gospel plan of salvation that has been used in the Restoration Movement ever since. Based on Acts 2:38, Scott believed that salvation requires faith, repentance and baptism. As an evangelist, he would first come into a community and find a group of children. He would ask them to hold up a hand, and then point to each finger and say "faith, repentance, baptism, remission of sins, gift of the Holy Spirit." Once the children had learned the mnemonic, he would ask them to tell their parents that he would be preaching that same gospel that evening.
