= Christian Baptist =

- Editor: Alexander Campbell
- Categories: Restoration Movement
- Frequency: Monthly
- First issue: 1823
- Final issue: 1830
- Country: United States
- Language: English

The Christian Baptist, established in 1823 by Alexander Campbell, was the first magazine associated with the early Restoration Movement. The prospectus for the Christian Baptist described its purpose as "[to] espouse the cause of no religious sect, excepting that ancient sect called 'Christians first at Antioch.' Its sole object shall be the eviction of truth, and the exposure of error in doctrine and practice." The style has been described as "lively" and "sarcastic". Campbell discontinued the Christian Baptist in 1830 and began publishing a new journal named the Millennial Harbinger which had a "milder tone".

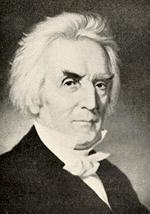
Alexander Campbell

== History ==
The original idea for publishing a monthly journal originated with Alexander's father, Thomas Campbell, in 1809. Alexander was convinced that an audience existed for his ideas by the success of a published version of one of his debates. The Baptist was printed in a shop that Alexander built on his own property. Contributing writers included Thomas Campbell and Walter Scott, and the Baptist was instrumental in attracting a number of individuals, including "Raccoon" John Smith, to the movement. By 1830 Campbell had become concerned about the denominational associations suggested by the name of the Christian Baptist. In addition, the Baptists with whom the Campbells had been associating were becoming increasingly frustrated with Alexander's criticisms and had begun to evict individuals associated with Campbell's reform efforts. Campbell discontinued the Christian Baptist in 1830 and began publishing a new journal named the Millennial Harbinger. He was concerned that "Christian Baptist" - which he considered to be less appropriate than the biblical term "Disciples" - was becoming the de facto name of the group. He also wanted the new journal to have a more positive tone, promoting reform and preparing the world for the second coming of Christ. The transition was not immediate, as he published both magazines during the first seven months of 1830.
