= Restoration Movement =

Christian movement seeking church reformation and unification

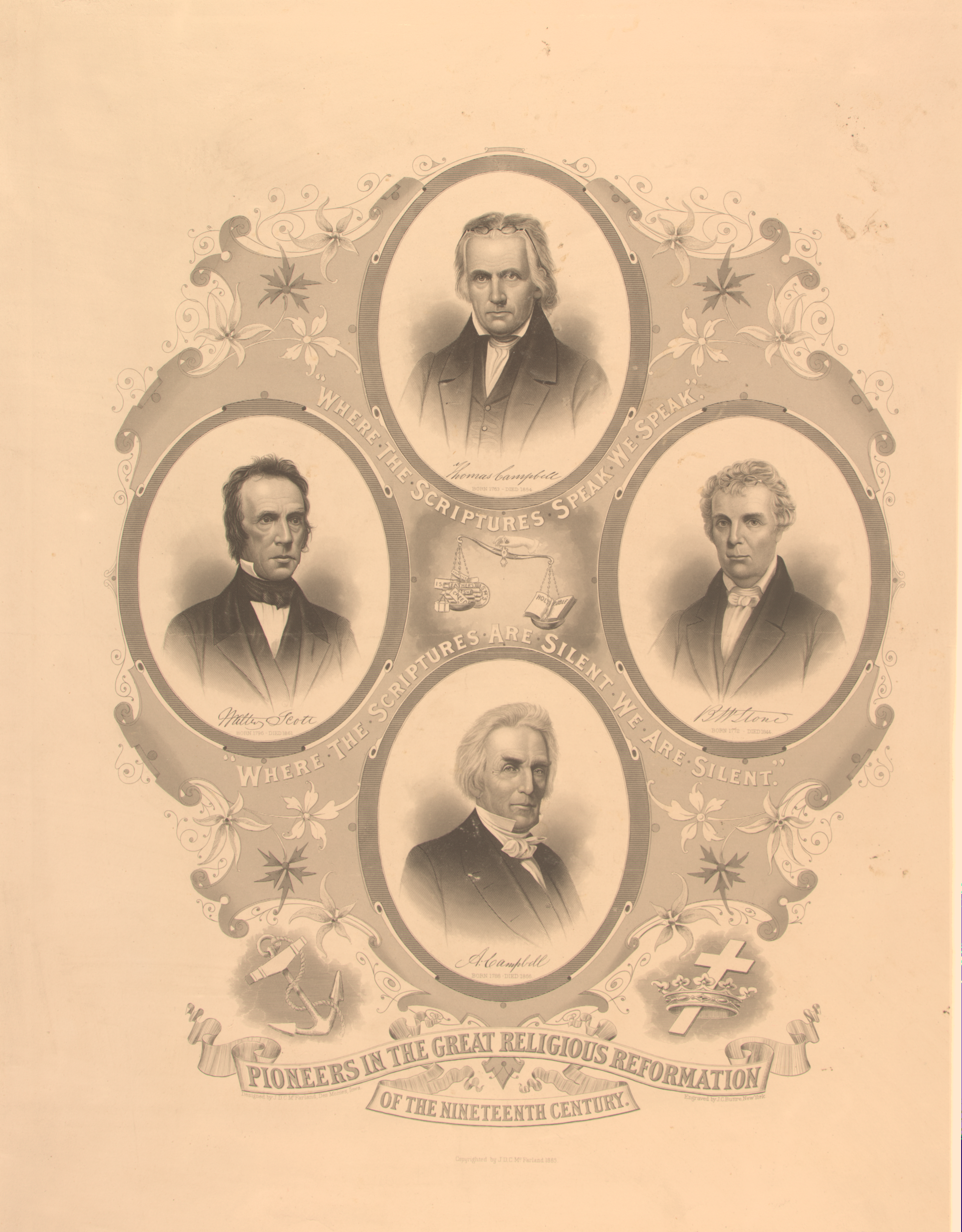
Early leaders of the Restoration Movement (clockwise, from top): Thomas Campbell, Barton W. Stone, Alexander Campbell, and Walter Scott

The Restoration Movement (also known as the American Restoration Movement or the Stone–Campbell Movement, and pejoratively as Campbellism) is a Christian movement that began on the American frontier during the Second Great Awakening (1790–1840) of the early 19th century. The pioneers of this movement were seeking to reform the church from within and sought "the unification of all Christians in a single body patterned after the church of the New Testament."

The Restoration Movement developed from several independent strands of religious revival that idealized early Christianity. Two groups which independently developed similar approaches to the Christian faith were particularly important. The first, led by Barton W. Stone, began at Cane Ridge, Kentucky, and identified as "Christians". The second began in western Pennsylvania and Virginia (now West Virginia) and was led by Thomas Campbell and his son, Alexander Campbell, both educated in Scotland; they eventually used the name "Disciples of Christ". Both groups sought to restore the Christian church based on visible patterns outlined in the New Testament, and both believed that creeds kept Christianity divided. In 1832, they joined in fellowship with a handshake.

Among other things, they were united in the belief that Jesus is the Christ, the Son of God; that Christians should observe the Lord's Supper on the first day of each week; and that baptism of adult believers was necessarily by immersion in water. Because the founders wanted to abandon all denominational labels, they used the biblical names for the followers of Jesus. Both groups promoted a return to the purposes of the 1st-century churches as described in the New Testament. One historian of the movement has argued that it was primarily a unity movement, with the restoration motif playing a subordinate role.

The Restoration Movement has since been divided into multiple separate groups. The three main groups are the Churches of Christ, the Christian Church (Disciples of Christ), and the independent Christian Church/Church of Christ congregations. Additionally, there are the International Churches of Christ, the International Christian Church, the Churches of Christ in Europe, and the Evangelical Christian Church in Canada, and the Churches of Christ in Australia. Some characterize the divisions in the movement as the result of the tension between the goals of restoration and ecumenism: the Churches of Christ and unaffiliated Christian Church/Church of Christ congregations resolved the tension by stressing restoration, while the Christian Church (Disciples of Christ) resolved the tension by stressing ecumenism.

== Name ==
Because the Restoration Movement lacks any centralized structure, having originated in a variety of places with different leaders, there is no consistent nomenclature for the movement as a whole. The term "Restoration Movement" became popular during the 19th century; this appears to be the influence of Alexander Campbell's essays on "A Restoration of the Ancient Order of Things" in the Christian Baptist. The term "Stone-Campbell Movement" emerged towards the end of the 19th century as a way to avoid the difficulties associated with some of the other names that have been used and to maintain a sense of the collective history of the movement.

== Principles ==
The Restoration Movement has been characterized by several key principles:

- Christianity should not be divided; Jesus intended the creation of one church.
- Creeds divide, but Christians should be able to find agreement by standing on the Bible (from which they believe all creeds are but human expansions or constrictions)
- Ecclesiastical traditions divide, but Christians should be able to find common ground by following the practice (as best as it can be determined) of the early church.
- Names of human origin divide, but Christians should be able to find common ground by using biblical names for the church (i.e., "Christian Church", "Church of God", or "Church of Christ" as opposed to "Methodist" or "Lutheran", etc.).

Thus, the church "should stress only what all Christians hold in common and should suppress all divisive doctrines and practices".

Several slogans have been used in the Restoration Movement to express some of the distinctive themes of the movement:

- "Where the Scriptures speak, we speak; where the Scriptures are silent, we are silent."
- "The church of Jesus Christ on earth is essentially, intentionally, and constitutionally one."
- "We are Christians only, but not the only Christians."
- "In essentials, unity; in opinions, liberty; in all things love."
- "No creed but Christ, no book but the Bible, no law but love, no name but the divine."
- "Do Bible things in Bible ways."
- "Call Bible things by Bible names."

== Background ==
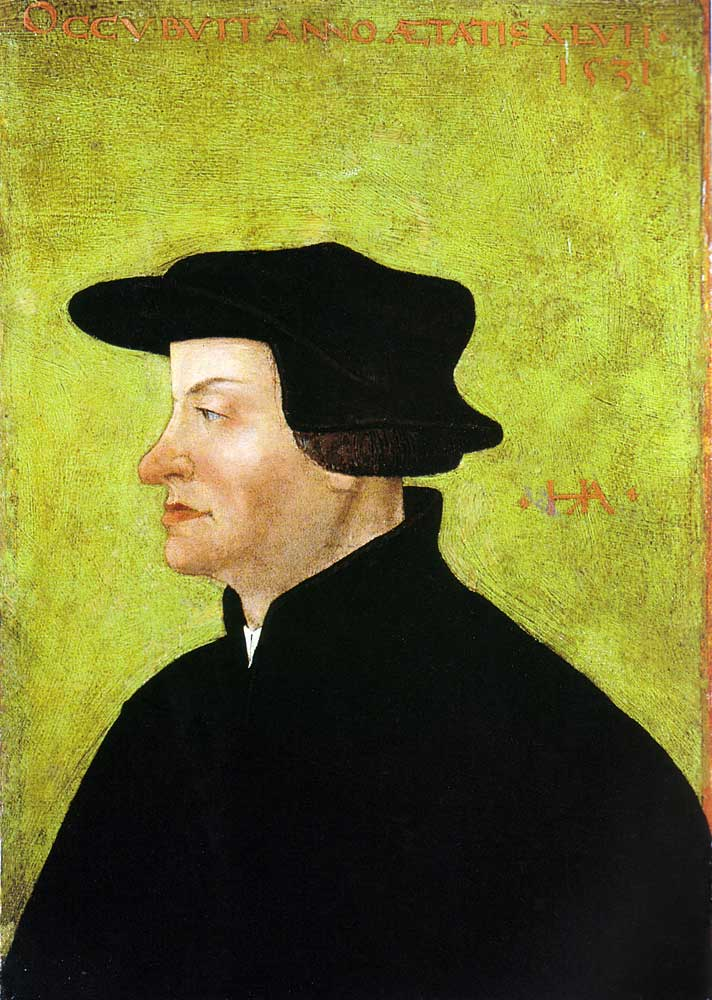
Huldrych Zwingli (oil, 1531) by Hans Asper (housed at Kunstmuseum)

During the late Middle Ages, dissenters such as John Wycliffe and Jan Hus called for a restoration of a primitive form of Christianity, but they were driven underground. As a result, it is difficult to find any direct links between such early dissenters and the Restoration Movement. Beginning with the Renaissance, intellectual roots become more straightforward to discern presently. At the heart of the Reformation was an emphasis on the principle of "scripture alone" (sola scriptura). This, along with the emphasis on individuals' rights to read the Bible and interpret it for themselves, and a movement to reduce rituals in worship, contributed to the intellectual background of early Restoration Movement leaders. The branch of the Reformation movement, which was represented by Huldrych Zwingli and John Calvin, contributed an emphasis on "restoring biblical forms and patterns."

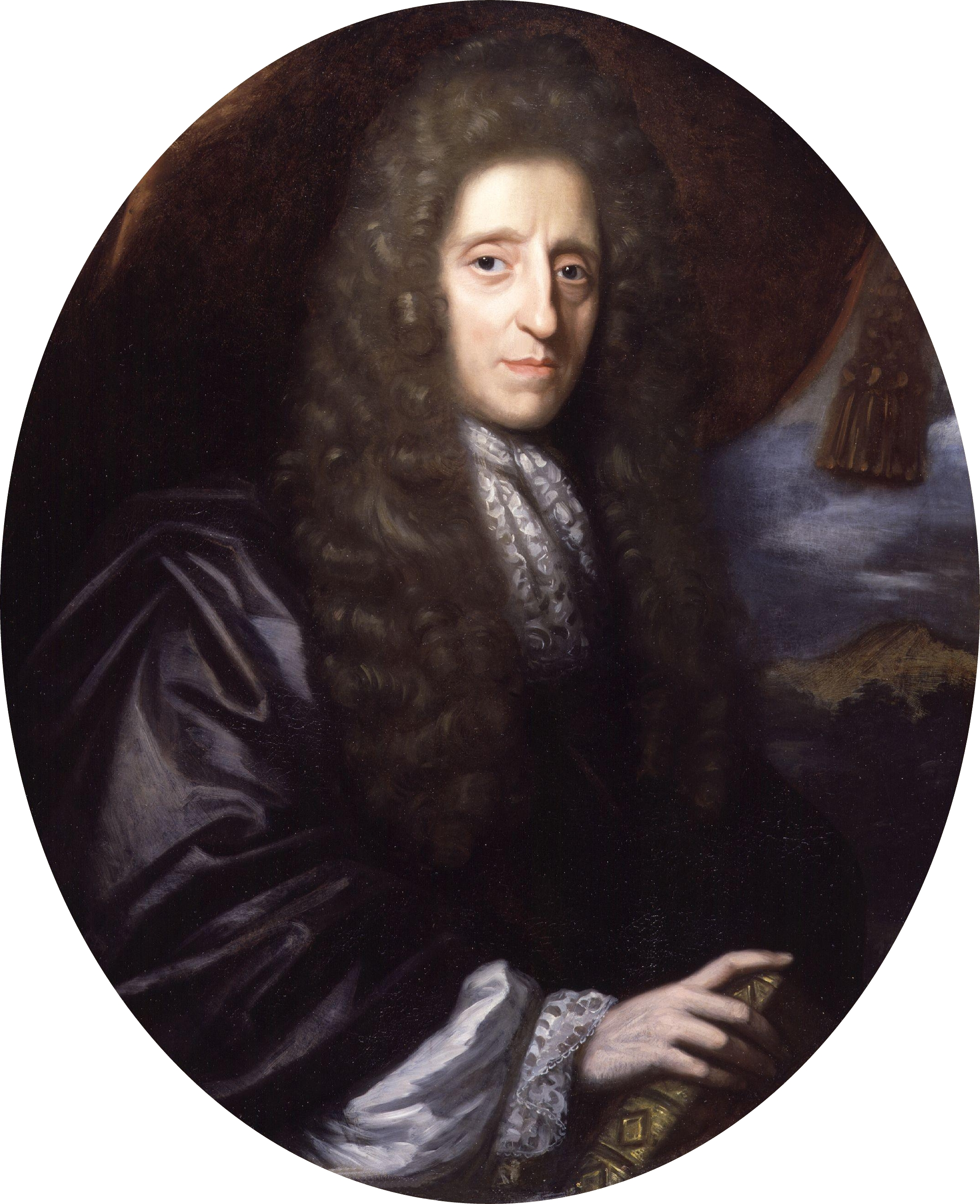
John Locke by Herman Verelst

The rationalism of John Locke provided another influence. Reacting to the deism of Edward Herbert, 1st Baron Herbert of Cherbury, Locke sought a way to address religious divisions and persecution without abandoning scripture. To do this, Locke argued against the right of government to enforce religious orthodoxy and turned to the Bible to supply a set of beliefs that all Christians could agree upon. The core teachings which he viewed as essential were the messiahship of Jesus and Jesus's direct commands. Christians could be devoutly committed to other Biblical teachings, but in Locke's view these were non-essentials over which Christians should never fight or try to coerce upon each other. Unlike the Puritans and the later Restoration Movement, Locke did not call for a systematic restoration of the early church. One of the basic goals of the English Puritans was to restore a pure, "primitive" church that would be a true apostolic community. This conception was a critical influence in the development of the Puritans in Colonial America. It has been described as the "oldest ecumenical movement in America":

Both the great founding documents of the movement are authentically ecumenical. In The Last Will and Testament of the Springfield Presbytery (1804), Barton Stone and his fellow revivalists dissolved their exclusive presbyterial relationship, desiring to "sink into union with the Body of Christ at large." Five years later Thomas Campbell wrote in The Declaration and Address of the Christian Association of Washington [PA] (1809) "The church of Christ on earth is essentially, intentionally and constitutionally one."

During the First Great Awakening, a movement developed among Baptists known as Separate Baptists. Two themes of the movement were the rejection of creeds and "freedom in the Spirit." The Separate Baptists saw scripture as the "perfect rule" for the church. However, while they turned to the Bible for a structural pattern for the church, they did not insist on complete agreement on the details of that pattern. The group originated in New England but was especially strong in the Southern United States, where the emphasis on a biblical pattern for the church grew stronger. In the latter half of the 18th century, Separate Baptists became more numerous on the western frontier of Kentucky and Tennessee, where the Stone and Campbell movements would later take root. The development of the Separate Baptists on the southern frontier helped prepare the ground for the Restoration Movement. The membership of both the Stone and Campbell groups drew heavily from the ranks of the Separate Baptists. Separate Baptist restorationism also contributed to the development of Landmarkism in the same region as the Stone-Campbell movement and at about the same time. Under the leadership of James Robinson Graves, the Landmark Baptists sought to define a blueprint of the so-called "primitive" church, believing that any deviation from that blueprint would prevent a person from being part of the "true" church.

James O'Kelly was an early advocate of seeking unity through a return to early Christianity. In 1792, dissatisfied with the role of bishops in the Methodist Episcopal Church, he created a schismatic movement of his own. O'Kelly's movement, centered in Virginia and North Carolina, were originally called the "Republican Methodists". In 1794, they adopted the name "Christian Church". During the same period, Elias Smith of Vermont and Abner Jones of New Hampshire led a movement espousing views similar to those of O'Kelly. They believed that members could—by looking to Christian scriptures—be Christians without being bound to human traditions

and the denominations brought by immigrants from Europe.

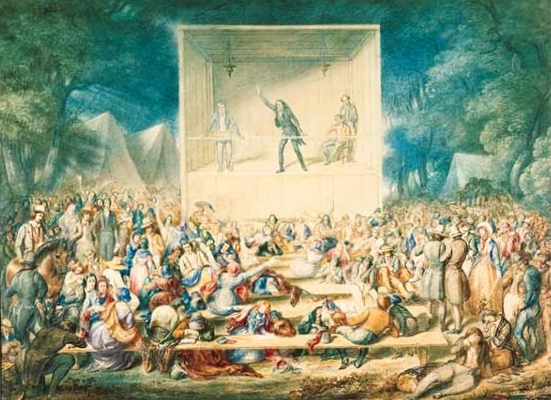
1839 Methodist camp meeting, watercolor from the Second Great Awakening

The ideal of restoring a "primitive" form of Christianity grew in popularity in the U.S. after the American Revolution. This desire to restore a purer form of Christianity played a role in the development of many groups during this period, known as the Second Great Awakening. These included the Church of Jesus Christ of Latter-day Saints, Baptists and Shakers. The Restoration Movement began during and was greatly influenced by, this Second Awakening. While the Campbells resisted what they saw as the spiritual manipulation of the camp meetings, the Southern phase of the awakening "was an important matrix of Barton Stone's reform movement" and shaped the evangelistic techniques used by both Stone and the Campbells.

== Stone movement ==
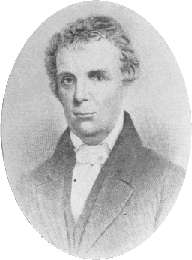
Barton W. Stone

=== Cane Ridge revival ===
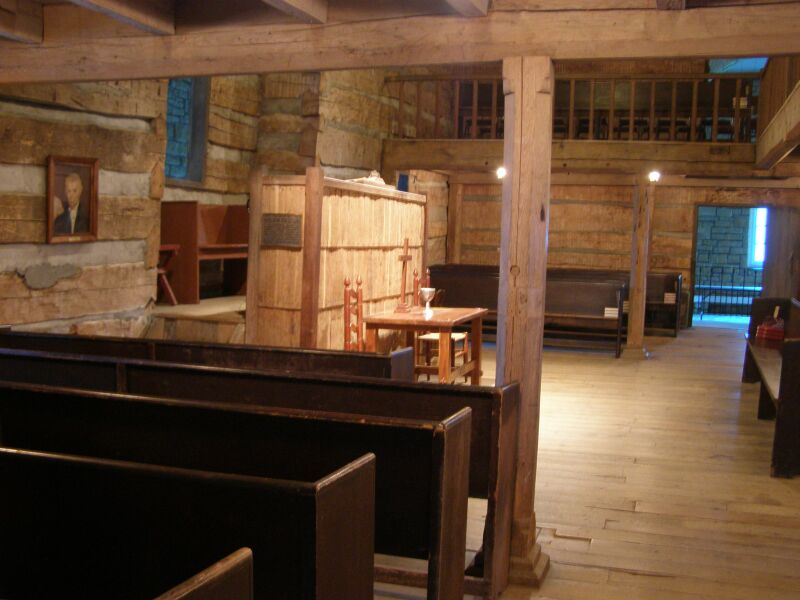
Interior of the original meeting house at Cane Ridge, Kentucky

In 1801, the Cane Ridge Revival in Kentucky planted the seed for a movement in Kentucky and the Ohio River valley to disassociate from Christian denominationalism. In 1803, Barton W. Stone and others withdrew from the Kentucky Synod and formed the Springfield Presbytery. The defining event of the Stone wing of the movement was the publication of Last Will and Testament of The Springfield Presbytery at Cane Ridge, Kentucky, in 1804. The brief document announces their withdrawal from Presbyterianism and their intention to be solely part of the broader Christian Church. The writers appeal for the unity of all who follow Jesus, suggest the value of congregational self-governance, and declare the Bible as the source for understanding the will of God. They denounced the "divisive" use of the Westminster Confession of Faith and adopted the name "Christian" to identify their group.

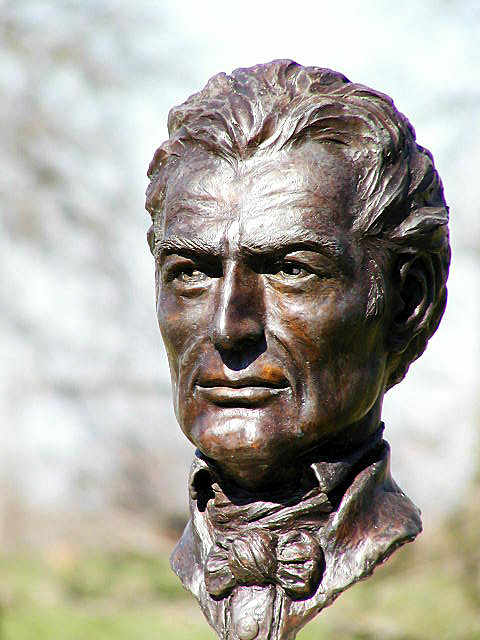
Bust of Barton W. Stone, in cemetery, at Cane Ridge

By 1804, Elias Smith had heard of the Stone movement; he had heard of the O'Kelly movement by 1808. Although not formally merged, the three groups were cooperating and fellowshiping by 1810. At that time the combined movement had a membership of approximately 20,000. This loose fellowship of churches was called by the names Christian Connection (also Christian Connexion) or "Christian Church."

=== Characteristics ===
The cornerstone of the Stone movement was Christian freedom. This ideal of freedom led them to reject all the historical creeds, traditions, and theological systems that had developed over time and to focus instead on a "primitive" Christianity based on the Christian Bible.

While restoring "primitive" Christianity was central to the Stone movement, they believed restoring the lifestyle of members of the early church was essential. During the early years, they "focused more... on holy and righteous living than on the forms and structures of the early church." The group also worked to restore the "primitive" church. Concerned that emphasizing particular practices could undermine Christian freedom, this effort tended to take the form of rejecting tradition rather than an explicit program of reconstructing New Testament practices. The emphasis on freedom was so strong that the movement avoided developing any ecclesiastical traditions; it was "largely without dogma, form, or structure." What held "the movement together was a commitment to primitive Christianity."

Another theme was that of millennialism. Many Christian Americans of the period believed that the millennium was near and based their hopes for the millennium on their new nation, the United States. Members of the Stone movement believed that only a unified Christianity based on the apostolic church, rather than a country or any of the existing denominations, could lead to the coming of the millennium. Stone's millennialism has been described as more "apocalyptic" than that of Alexander Campbell, in that he believed people were too flawed to usher in a millennial age through human progress. Rather, he believed that it depended on the power of God and that while waiting for God to establish His kingdom, one should live as if the rule of God were already fully established. For the Stone movement, this millennial emphasis had less to do with eschatological theories and more about a countercultural commitment to live as if the kingdom of God were already established on earth. This apocalyptic perspective or worldview led many in the Stone movement to adopt pacifism, avoid participating in civil government, and reject violence, militarism, greed, materialism, and slavery.

== Campbell movement ==
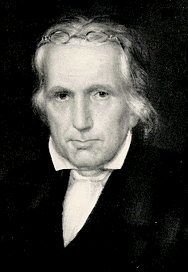
Thomas Campbell

=== Background ===
The Campbell wing of the movement was launched when Thomas Campbell published the Declaration and Address of the Christian Association of Washington in 1809. The Presbyterian Synod had suspended his ministerial credentials. In The Declaration and Address, he set forth some of his convictions about the church of Jesus Christ. He organized the Christian Association of Washington in Washington County, Pennsylvania on the western frontier of the state, not as a church but as an association of persons seeking to grow in faith. On May 4, 1811, the Christian Association reconstituted itself as a congregationally governed church. With the building it constructed at Brush Run, Pennsylvania, it became known as Brush Run Church. When their study of the New Testament led the reformers to begin to practice baptism by immersion, the nearby Redstone Baptist Association invited Brush Run Church to join with them for the purpose of fellowship. The reformers agreed, provided that they would be "allowed to preach and to teach whatever they learned from the Scriptures."

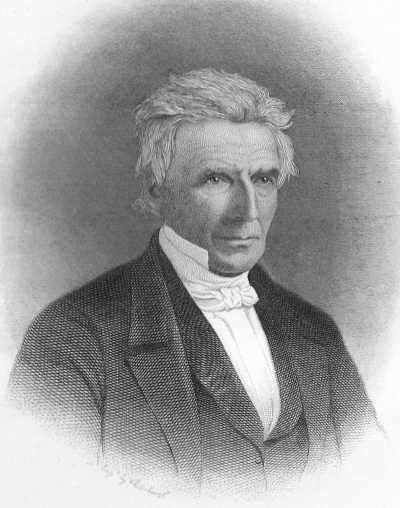
Alexander Campbell

Thomas' son Alexander came to the U.S. to join him in 1809. Before long, he assumed the leading role in the movement. The Campbells worked within the Redstone Baptist Association during the period 1815 through 1824. While both the Campbells and the Baptists shared practices of baptism by immersion and congregational polity, it quickly became clear the Campbells and their associates were not traditional Baptists. Within the Redstone Association, some of the Baptist leaders considered the differences intolerable when Alexander Campbell began publishing a journal, The Christian Baptist, which promoted reform. Campbell anticipated the conflict and moved his membership to a congregation of the Mahoning Baptist Association in 1824. In 1827, the Mahoning Association appointed Walter Scott as an evangelist. Through Scott's efforts, the Mahoning Association grew rapidly. In 1828, Thomas Campbell visited several of the congregations formed by Scott and heard him preach. Campbell believed that Scott was bringing an important new dimension to the movement with his approach to evangelism.

Alexander used The Christian Baptist to address what he saw as the key issue of reconstructing the apostolic Christian community in a systematic and rational manner. He wanted to clearly distinguish between essential and non-essential aspects of primitive Christianity. Among what he identified as essential were "congregational autonomy, a plurality of elders in each congregation, weekly communion, and immersion for the remission of sins." Among practices he rejected as non-essential were "the holy kiss, deaconesses, communal living, footwashing and charismatic exercises."

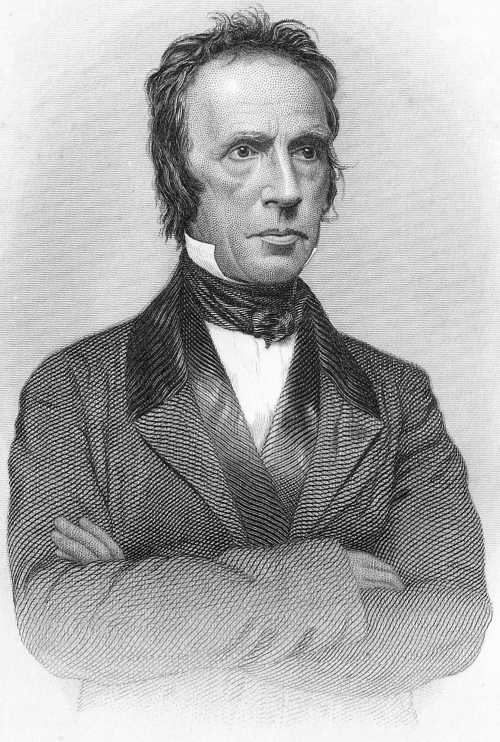
Walter Scott

Several Baptist associations began disassociating congregations that refused to subscribe to the Philadelphia Confession. The Mahoning Association came under attack. In 1830, The Mahoning Baptist Association disbanded. The younger Campbell ceased publication of the Christian Baptist. In January 1831, he began publication of the Millennial Harbinger.

=== Characteristics ===
The Age of Enlightenment had a significant influence on the Campbell movement. Thomas Campbell was a student of the Enlightenment philosopher John Locke. While he did not explicitly use the term "essentials" in the Declaration and Address, Thomas proposed the same solution to religious division as had been advanced earlier by Locke and Edward Herbert: "[R]educe religion to a set of essentials upon which all reasonable persons might agree." The essentials he identified were those practices for which the Bible provided: "a 'Thus saith the Lord,' either in express terms or by approved precedent." Unlike Locke, who considered the earlier efforts by Puritans to be inherently divisive, Thomas argued for "a complete restoration of apostolic Christianity." Thomas believed that creeds served to divide Christians. He also believed that the Bible was clear enough that anyone could understand it and, thus, creeds were unnecessary.

Alexander Campbell was also deeply influenced by Enlightenment thinking, in particular the Scottish School of Common Sense of Thomas Reid and Dugald Stewart. This group believed that the Bible related concrete facts rather than abstract truths, and advocated a scientific or "Baconian" approach to interpreting the Bible. It would begin with those facts, arrange the ones applicable to a given topic, and draw conclusions from them in a way that has been described as "nothing less than the scientific method applied to the Bible." Alexander reflected this Baconian approach when he repeatedly argued that "the Bible is a book of facts, not of opinions, theories, abstract generalities, nor of verbal definitions." Just as a reliance on facts provides the basis for agreement among scientists, Alexander believed that if Christians limited themselves to the facts found in the Bible they would necessarily come to agreement. He believed that those facts, approached in a rational and scientific manner, provided a blueprint or constitution for the church. Alexander was attracted to this scientific approach to the Bible because it offered a reliable basis for Christian unity.

Thomas Campbell combined the Enlightenment approach to unity with the Reformed and Puritan traditions of restoration. The Enlightenment affected the Campbell movement in two ways. First, it provided the idea that Christian unity could be achieved by finding a set of essentials that all reasonable people could agree on. Second, it also provided the concept of a rational faith that was formulated and defended based on facts derived from the Bible. Campbell's solution to achieve Christian unity combined forsaking the creeds and traditions, which he believed had divided Christians, and recovering the primitive Christianity, found in scripture, that was common for all Christians.

Alexander Campbell's millennialism was more optimistic than Stone's. He had more confidence in the potential for human progress and believed that Christians could unite to transform the world and initiate a millennial age. Campbell's conceptions were postmillennial, as he anticipated that the progress of the church and society would lead to an age of peace and righteousness before the return of Christ. This optimistic approach meant that, in addition to his commitment to primitivism, he had a progressive strand in his thinking.

== Merger of the Stone and Campbell movements ==
The Campbell movement was characterized by a "systematic and rational reconstruction" of the early church, in contrast to the Stone movement which was characterized by radical freedom and lack of dogma. Despite their differences, the two movements agreed on several critical issues. Both saw restoring apostolic Christianity as a means of hastening the millennium. Both also saw restoring the early church as a route to Christian freedom. And both believed that unity among Christians could be achieved by using apostolic Christianity as a model. The commitment of both movements to restoring the early church and to uniting Christians was enough to motivate a union between many in the two movements.

"Raccoon" John Smith

The Stone and Campbell movements merged in 1832. This was formalized at the Hill Street Meeting House in Lexington, Kentucky, with a handshake between Stone and "Raccoon" John Smith. Smith had been chosen by attendees as spokesman for the followers of the Campbells. A preliminary meeting of the two groups had been held in late December 1831, culminating with the merger on January 1, 1832. Two representatives of the assembly were appointed to carry the news of the union to all the churches: John Rogers for the Christians and Smith for the reformers. Despite some challenges, the merger succeeded. Many believed the union held great promise for the future success of the combined movement and greeted the news enthusiastically.

When the two movements united, only a minority of Christians participated. Those who did were from congregations west of the Appalachian Mountains that had come into contact with the Stone movement. The eastern members had several key differences with the Stone and Campbell group: an emphasis on conversion experience, quarterly observance of communion, and nontrinitarianism. Those who did not unite with Campbell (the Christian Connection) merged with the Congregational Churches in 1931 to form the Congregational Christian Churches. In 1957, the Congregational Christian Church merged with the Evangelical and Reformed Church to become the United Church of Christ.

=== Genealogical chart ===
Genealogy of the Restoration Movement

Elias Smith & Abner Jones	James O'Kelly	Barton W. Stone	Thomas & Alexander Campbell
New England	North Carolina	Kentucky	W. Virginia & Pennsylvania
Baptists	Methodist; Episcopal; Church	Presbyterian Church in the USA	Baptists	Associate Presbytery in America
Republican Methodist Church, later Christians (1792)	Cane; Ridge; Revival (1801)
Rice Haggard influences O'Kelly and subsequently Stone to use the name "Christians"	Springfield Presbytery (1803)	Christian Association of Washington (1809)	Declaration and Address
New England Christians (1801)	The "Christian" movements loosely associate together around 1810	Christians in the West (1804)	Last Will and Testament of the Springfield; Presbytery	Redstone Baptist Association (1815)	The Campbell's Brush Run Church joins RBA
Christian Church/ Christian Connection (c. 1810)	MBA appoints Walter Scott as evangelist (1827)	Mahoning Baptist Association (1824)	Brush Run withdraws from RBA and joins MBA
Disciples of Christ (1830)
Christian Connection	Most Christian Churches outside of the Ohio Valley remain separate	Most of Stone's Christians unite with Campbell's Disciples	Restoration Movement (1832)	"Racoon" John Smith represents the Disciples in merger meeting
ACMS (1849)	General Convention (1849)	Missionary societies governed by convention form among part of the Movement
Congregational; Churches	CWBM (1874)
Canadian Congregationalists, Methodists and Presbyterians merge	FCMS (1876)	Churches of Christ recognized as separate group	Churches of Christ (1906)
United Church of Canada (1925)	Congregational Christian Churches (1931)	International Convention (1917)	Convention reorganized; missionary societies merge soon after
Evangelical and Reformed; Church	United Christian Missionary Society (1919)	Formation of NACC starts separation of independents	North American Christian Convention (1926)
United; Church of Christ (1957)	Disciples officially organize as a denomination	Christian Church (Disciples of Christ) (1968)	Independents withdraw from CC(DOC), recognized separately in 1971	Christian Churches and Churches of Christ (1971)	Churches of Christ (non-institutional) (c. 1960)
DOC–UCC; Full Communion Agreement (1989)	Disciple Heritage Fellowship (1995)	International; Churches of Christ (1993)
UCCan–UCC; Full Communion Agreement (2015)	DOC–UCCan; Full Communion Agreement (2019)

== United movement (1832–1906) ==
The merger raised the question of what to call the new movement. Finding a biblical, non-sectarian name was important. Stone wanted to continue to use the name "Christians," while Alexander Campbell insisted upon "Disciples of Christ". Stone advocated using the name "Christians" based on its use in Acts 11:26, while Campbell preferred the term "disciples" because he saw it as both a more humble and an older designation. As a result, both names were used, and the confusion over names has continued ever since.

After 1832, use of the term "Reformation" became frequent among leaders of the movement. The Campbells had designated themselves as "Reformers," and other early leaders also saw themselves as reformers seeking Christian unity and restoring apostolic Christianity. The movement's language at the time included phrases such as "religious reformation," the "present reformation," the "current reformation" and "the cause of reformation." The term "Restoration Movement" became popular by the late 19th century. It appears to have been inspired by Alexander Campbell's essays on "A Restoration of the Ancient Order of Things" in the Christian Baptist.

The combined movement grew rapidly over the period from 1832 to 1906. According to the 1906 U.S. Religious Census the combined membership of the movement made it the 6th largest Christian group in the country at that time.

Estimated Membership
Year	1832	1860	1890	1900	1906
Membership	22,000	192,000	641,051	1,120,000	1,142,359

=== Journals ===
The Disciples do not have bishops; they have editors

— early movement historian William Thomas Moore

From the beginning of the movement, the free exchange of ideas among the people was fostered by the journals published by its leaders. Alexander Campbell published The Christian Baptist and The Millennial Harbinger. Stone published The Christian Messenger. Both men routinely published the contributions of persons whose positions differed radically from their own. Following Campbell's death in 1866, the journals were used to keep the discussions going. Between 1870 and 1900, two journals emerged as the most prominent. The Christian Standard was edited and published by Isaac Errett of Cincinnati. The Christian Evangelist was edited and published by JH Garrison from St. Louis. The two men enjoyed a friendly rivalry and kept the dialog going within the movement.

The Gospel Advocate was founded by the Nashville-area preacher Tolbert Fanning in 1855. Fanning's student William Lipscomb served as co-editor until the American Civil War forced them to suspend publication in 1861. After the end of the Civil War, publication resumed in 1866 under the editorship of Fanning and Lipscomb's younger brother David Lipscomb; Fanning soon retired, and David Lipscomb became the sole editor. While Lipscomb was the editor, the focus was on seeking unity by following scripture exactly, and the Advocate's editorial position was to reject anything that is not explicitly allowed by scripture.

The Christian Oracle began publication in 1884. It was later known as The Christian Century and offered an interdenominational appeal. In 1914, Garrison's Christian Publishing company was purchased by R.A. Long. He established a non-profit corporation, The Christian Board of Publication as the Brotherhood publishing house.

=== Anabaptism and materialism controversies ===
The Christadelphians, Church of the Blessed Hope, and Church of God (General Conference) also have roots in the restoration movement, but took their own direction about this time.

In 1832 Walter Scott baptised John Thomas, an English doctor who had emigrated to the United States. Thomas was a strong supporter of Alexander Campbell and the principles of the Disciples movement, and he quickly became a well-known leader and teacher. In 1834, however, Thomas took a contrary position to Campbell on the significance of baptism which led to a sharp conflict between the two men. While Campbell believed baptism by immersion to be very important, he recognised as Christians all who believed Jesus of Nazareth to be Messiah and Lord, and recognised any prior baptism. For this reason, members of Baptist churches who joined the Disciples movement were not required to be baptised again. Thomas, on the other hand, insisted that a baptism based on a different understanding of the gospel to that held in the Disciples movement was not a valid baptism, and he called for rebaptism in his periodical, the Apostolic Advocate. Campbell viewed this as sectarianism, which cut across the fundamental commitment of the Disciples movement to "the union of all Christians," and rejected "anabaptism." The two men became estranged.

Thomas began to refuse to share prayer, worship, or communion with those he considered not to be validly baptised Christians. His theological views also continued to develop. By 1837 he was teaching annihilationism, and he debated a Presbyterian clergyman, Isaac Watts. Campbell interpreted this as materialism and believed that it undermined the biblical doctrine of the resurrection, and he reacted strongly. In the Millennial Harbinger Campbell announced that he could no longer consider Thomas a brother. Many congregations of Disciples took this as an indication that they should withhold fellowship from Thomas, and he found himself on the margins of the movement. Thomas continued to have supporters among the Disciples but moved further from Christian orthodoxy. In 1846 he published a "Confession and Abjuration" of the faith he held at his baptism, and he arranged to be baptised again. Despite this, when he toured the United Kingdom to give prophetic lectures in 1848–1850 he played down his separation from the Disciples movement, in an endeavour to access congregations in Britain. But his true position was discovered by James Wallis and David King, and the movement closed ranks against him.

In 1864 he coined the name "Christadelphian" for those who shared his views and sought to register as conscientious objectors to military service. The name was adopted by Robert Roberts, the Scottish protege of Thomas, for the periodical which he had just begun to publish in Birmingham; and the sect began to grow rapidly.

Benjamin Wilson left the Disciples about the same time as Thomas, but split with Thomas in 1863 over disagreements about eschatology, forming the Church of God of the Abrahamic Faith. During the American Civil War his followers also sought to register as conscientious objectors. Some congregations were unable to register this name because of local regulations and chose an alternative name, Church of the Blessed Hope; but the two names referred to the same sect. The sect divided in 1921, and the Church of God (General Conference) was formed by the larger grouping.

=== Missionary society controversy ===
In 1849, the first national convention was held at Cincinnati, Ohio. Campbell had concerns that holding conventions would lead the movement into divisive denominationalism. He did not attend the gathering. Among its actions, the convention elected Campbell its president and created the American Christian Missionary Society (ACMS). By the end of the century, the Foreign Christian Missionary Society and the Christian Woman's Board of Missions were also engaged in missionary activities. Forming the ACMS did not reflect a consensus of the entire movement, and these para-church organizations became a divisive issue. While there was no disagreement over the need for evangelism, many believed that missionary societies were not authorized by scripture and would compromise the autonomy of local congregations.

The ACMS was not as successful as proponents had hoped. It was opposed by those who believed any extra-congregational organizations were inappropriate; hostility grew when the ACMS took a stand in 1863 favoring the Union side during the Civil War. A convention held in Louisville, Kentucky, in 1869 adopted a plan intended to address "a perceived need to reorganize the American Christian Missionary Society (ACMS) in a way that would be acceptable to more members of the Movement." The "Louisville Plan," as it came to be known, attempted to build on existing local and regional conventions and to "promote the harmonious cooperation of all the state and District Boards and Conventions." It established a General Christian Missionary Convention. Membership was congregational rather than individual. Local congregations elected delegates to district meetings, which in turn elected delegates to state meetings. States were given two delegates, plus an additional delegate for every 5,000 members. The plan proved divisive and faced immediate opposition. Opponents continued to argue that any organizational structure above the local congregational level was not authorized by scripture, and there was a general concern that the board had been given too much authority. By 1872 the Louisville Plan had effectively failed. Direct contributions from individuals were sought again in 1873, individual membership was reinstated in 1881, and the name was changed back to the American Christian Missionary Society in 1895.

=== Use of musical instruments in worship ===
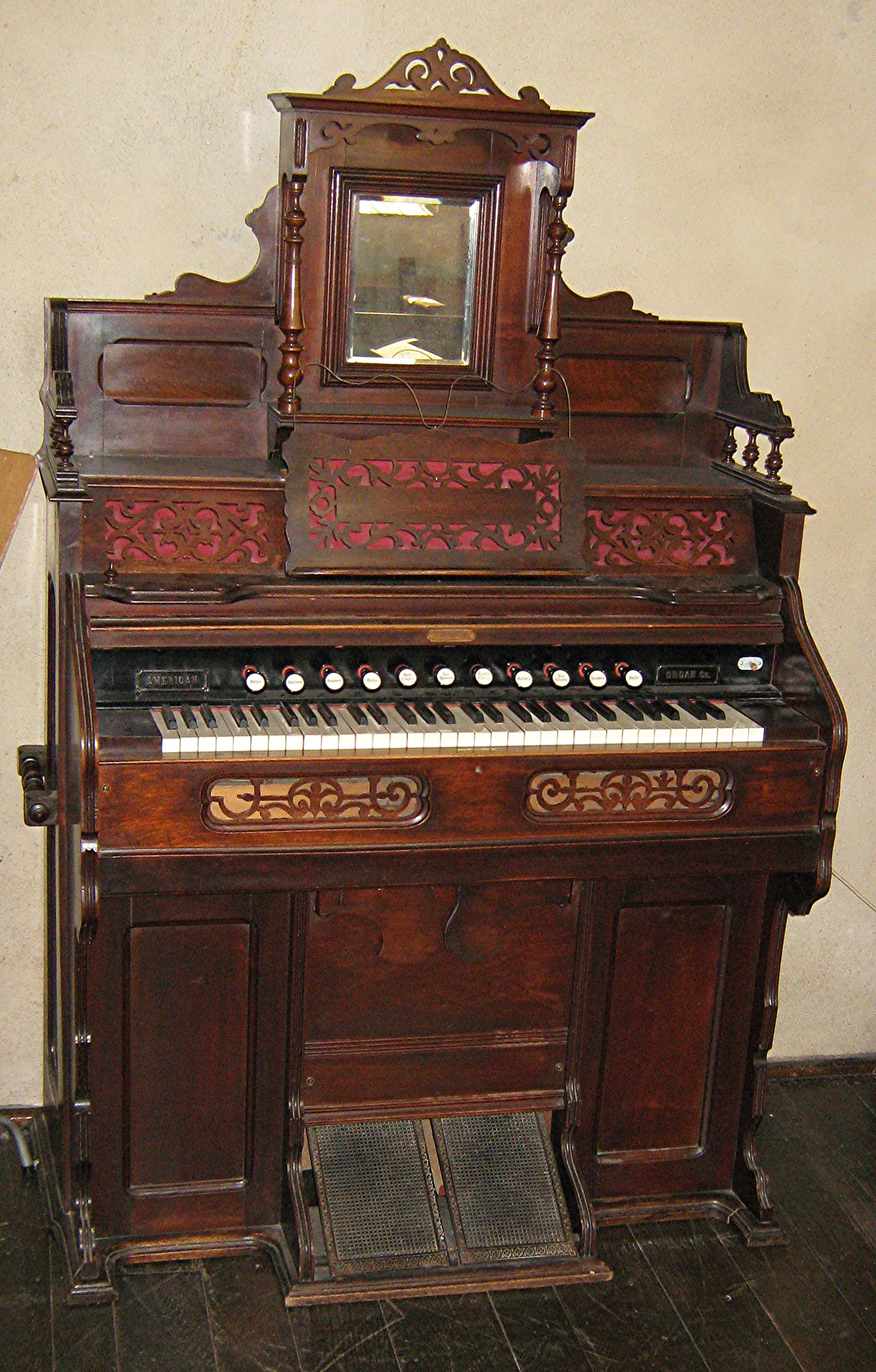
Melodeon

The use of musical instruments in worship was discussed in journal articles as early as 1849, but initial reactions were generally unfavorable. Some congregations, however, are documented as having used musical instruments in the 1850s and 1860s. An example is the church in Midway, Kentucky, which was using an instrument by 1860. A member of the congregation, L. L. Pinkerton, brought a melodeon into the church building. The minister had been distressed to his "breaking point" by the poor quality of the congregation's singing. At first, the instrument was used for singing practices held on Saturday nights but was then incorporated into worship on Sundays. One of the elders of that assembly removed the first melodeon, but it was soon replaced by another.

Both acceptance of instruments and discussion of the issue grew after the Civil War. Opponents argued that the New Testament provided no authorization for their use in worship, while supporters argued on the basis of expediency and Christian liberty. Affluent urban congregations were more likely to adopt musical instruments, while poorer and more rural congregations tended to see them as "an accommodation to the ways of the world."

The Encyclopedia of the Stone-Campbell Movement notes that Restoration Movement historians have tended to interpret the controversy over the use of musical instruments in worship in ways that "reflect their own attitudes on the issue." Examples are given of historians from different branches of the movement interpreting it in relation to the statements of early Restoration Movement leaders, in terms of social and cultural factors, differing approaches to interpreting scripture, differing approaches to the authority of scripture, and "ecumenical progressivism" versus "sectarian primitivism."

=== Biblical interpretation ===
The early 19th-century Restoration Movement encompassed very different views concerning the role of clergy: the Campbell branch was strongly anti-clergy, believing there was no justification for a clergy/lay distinction, while the Stone branch believed that only an ordained minister could officiate at communion.

Early leaders of the movement had a high view of scripture and believed that it was both inspired and infallible. Dissenting views developed during the 19th century. As early as 1849, Pinkerton denied the inerrancy of the Bible. According to the Encyclopedia of the Stone-Campbell Movement Pinkerton is "sometimes labeled the first 'liberal' of the Stone-Campbell Movement." In addition to rejecting the plenary inspiration of the Bible and supporting the use of instruments in worship, Pinkerton also supported "open membership" (recognizing as members individuals who have not been baptized by immersion) and was a strong supporter of the temperance and abolition movements. As the 19th century progressed, the denial of the inerrancy of the Bible slowly spread. In 1883 the editor of the Christian Standard, Isaac Errett, said "Admitting the fact of inspiration, have we in the inspired Scriptures an infallible guide?... I do not see how we can answer this question affirmatively." Others, including JW McGarvey, fiercely opposed these liberal views.

== Separation of the Churches of Christ and Christian Churches ==
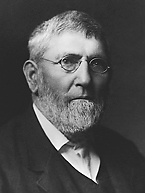
David Lipscomb

Nothing in life has given me more pain in heart than the separation from those I have heretofore worked with and loved

— David Lipscomb, 1899

=== Factors leading to the separation ===
Disagreement over centralized organizations above the local congregational level, such as missionary societies and conventions, was one important factor leading to the separation of the Churches of Christ from the Christian Church (Disciples of Christ). After the Civil War more congregations began using instruments, which led to growing controversy. The greatest acceptance was among urban congregations in the Northern states; very few congregations in the Southern United States used instruments in worship. While music and the approach to missionary work were the most visible issues, there were also some deeper ones, such as basic differences in the underlying approach to Biblical interpretation. For the Churches of Christ, any practices not present in accounts of New Testament worship were not permissible in the church, and they could find no New Testament documentation of the use of instrumental music in worship. For the Christian Churches, any practices not expressly forbidden could be considered. The Civil War exacerbated the cultural tensions between the two groups.

As the 19th century progressed, a division gradually developed between those whose primary commitment was to unity and those whose primary commitment was to the restoration of the primitive church. Those whose primary focus was unity gradually took on "an explicitly ecumenical agenda" and "sloughed off the restorationist vision." This group increasingly used the terms "Disciples of Christ" and "Christian Churches" rather than "Churches of Christ." At the same time, those whose primary focus was restoration of the primitive church increasingly used the term "Churches of Christ" rather than "Disciples of Christ." Reports on the changes and increasing separation among the groups were published as early as 1883.

The rise of women leaders in the temperance and missionary movements, primarily in the North, also contributed to the separation of the unaffiliated Christian Church/Church of Christ congregations. In the Christian Churches, many women spoke in public on behalf of the Christian Woman's Board of Missions and Woman's Christian Temperance Union. In contrast, the Churches of Christ largely discouraged women from joining activist women's organizations and speaking in public about any issue. In 1889 the Erie, Illinois, Christian Church confirmed the leadership role of women by ordaining Clara Babcock as the first known woman Disciple preacher.

=== Formal recognition in 1906 ===
The United States Census Bureau began a religious census in 1906. Special Agents were used to collect information on those groups which had little or no formal organizational structure, such as the churches associated with the Restoration Movement. Officials working on the census noticed signs that the movement was no longer unified: the Gospel Advocate appeared at times to distance itself from the Disciples of Christ, and the Bureau had received at least one letter claiming that some "churches of Christ" were no longer affiliated with the "Disciples of Christ."

To resolve the question, Census Director Simon Newton Dexter North wrote a letter to David Lipscomb, the editor of the Advocate. He asked:

I would like to know: 1. Whether there is a religious body called "Church of Christ," not identified with the Disciples of Christ, or any other Baptist body? 2. If there is such a body, has it any general organization, with headquarters, officers, district or general conventions, associations or conferences? 3. How did it originate, and what are its distinctive principles? 4. How best can there be secured a complete list of the churches?

Lipscomb summarized the early history of the movement, described the "general organization of the churches under a missionary society with a moneyed membership" and the "adoption of instrumental music in the worship" as "a subversion of the fundamental principles on which the churches were based," and then continued:

There is a distinct people taking the word of God as their only and sufficient rule of faith, calling their churches "churches of Christ" or "churches of God," distinct and separate in name, work, and rule of faith from all other bodies of people.

The 1906 U.S. Religious Census for the first time listed the "Churches of Christ" and the "Disciples of Christ" as separate and distinct groups.This, however, was simply the recognition of a division that had been growing for years, with published reports as early as 1883. The process that led to this separation had begun prior to the Civil War.

For Lipscomb, an underlying theological concern was the adoption of German liberal theology by many among the Disciples wing of the Restoration Movement. He saw them as taking a direction very different from the principles enunciated by Thomas and Alexander Campbell. Lipscomb's response to the Census Bureau, and its official listing of the two groups in 1906, became another source of friction between the groups. James Harvey Garrison, editor of The Christian-Evangelist, accused Lipscomb of "sectarianism." Lipscomb said that he had "done nothing to bring about the present condition of affairs," the Census Bureau had started the discussion, and he had simply answered the question they brought to him.

Movement historian Douglas Foster has summarized the events this way:

The data reflected what had already happened (and what continued to happen for at least another decade). The Census Bureau itself had noticed a rift between Churches of Christ and Disciples of Christ, and in the interest of reliable data collection tried to ascertain if that was true. Lipscomb agreed that it was accurate to list the two separately; Garrison did not. The division did not begin or happen in 1906—it was nearing its end. The government did not declare the division; the Census Bureau simply published data it received.

=== Aftermath ===
When the 1906 U.S. Religious Census was published in 1910 it reported combined totals for the "Disciples or Christians" for comparison to the 1890 statistics on the movement, as well as separate statistics for the "Disciples of Christ" and the "Churches of Christ." The Disciples were by far the larger of the two groups at the time.

Relative Size of Disciples of Christ and Churches of Christ in 1906
	Congregations	Members
"Disciples of Christ"	8,293 (75.8%)	982,701 (86.0%)
"Churches of Christ"	2,649 (24.2%)	159,658 (14.0%)
Total "Disciples or Christians"	10,942	1,142,359

Generally speaking, the Disciples of Christ congregations tended to be predominantly urban and Northern, while the Churches of Christ were predominantly rural and Southern. The Disciples favored college-educated clergy, while the Churches of Christ discouraged formal theological education because they opposed the creation of a professional clergy. Disciples congregations tended to be wealthier and constructed larger, more expensive church buildings. Churches of Christ congregations built more modest structures and criticized the wearing of expensive clothing at worship. One commentator has described the Disciples "ideal" as reflecting the "businessman," and the Church of Christ "ideal" as reflecting "the simple and austere yeoman farmer."

Churches of Christ have maintained an ongoing commitment to purely congregational structure, rather than a denominational one, and have no central headquarters, councils, or other organizational structure above the local church level.

After the separation from the Churches of Christ, tensions remained among the Disciples of Christ over theological liberalism, the nascent ecumenical movement and "open membership." While the process was lengthy, the more conservative unaffiliated Christian Church/Church of Christ congregations eventually emerged as a separately identifiable religious body from the Christian Church (Disciples of Christ). Some commentators believe divisions in the movement have resulted from the tension between the goals of restoration and ecumenism, and see the Churches of Christ and unaffiliated Christian Church/Church of Christ congregations resolving the tension by stressing restoration while the Christian Church (Disciples of Christ) resolve the tension by stressing ecumenism.

All of the three major U.S. branches of the movement share the following characteristics:

- A high view, compared to other Christian traditions, of the office of the elder; and
- A "commitment to the priesthood of all believers".

The term "restoration movement" has remained popular among the Churches of Christ and the unaffiliated Christian Church/Church of Christ congregations. Because of the emphasis it places on the theme of restoration, it has been a less comfortable fit for those whose primary focus has been on the theme of unity. Historically, the term "Disciples of Christ" has also been used by some as a collective designation for the movement. It has evolved, however, into a designation for a particular branch of the movement—the Christian Church (Disciples of Christ)—as a result of the divisions of the late 19th and early 20th centuries.

The movement as a whole grew significantly over the course of the 20th century, and the relative size of the different groups associated with the movement shifted as well.

Relative Size of Restoration Movement Groups in 2000
	Congregations	Members
Christian Church (Disciples of Christ)	3,625	785,776
Unaffiliated Christian Church/Church of Christ congregations	5,293	1,453,160
Churches of Christ	12,584	1,584,162
International Churches of Christ	450	120 000

== Subsequent development of the Christian Churches (Disciples of Christ) ==
Following the 1906 separation of the Churches of Christ, controversy still existed within the movement over whether the missionary efforts should be cooperative or independently sponsored by congregations. Questions on the role of the methods of biblical criticism to the study and interpretation of the Bible were also among the issues in conflict. An awareness of historical criticism began developing in the 1880s, and by the 1920s many Disciples accepted the work of the higher critics. By that time the question of "open membership," or "admission of the pious unimmersed to membership" had arisen as an additional source of tension. During the first half of the 20th century the opposing factions among the Christian Churches coexisted but with discomfort. The three missionary societies were merged into the United Christian Missionary Society in 1920. Human service ministries grew through the National Benevolent Association providing assistance to orphans, the elderly and the disabled. By mid century, the cooperative Christian Churches and the independent Christian Churches were following different paths.

By 1926 a split began to form within the Disciples over the future direction of the church. Conservatives within the group began to have problems with the perceived liberalism of the leadership, upon the same grounds described earlier in the accepting of instrumental music in worship. In 1927 they held the first North American Christian Convention, and the unaffiliated Christian Church/Church of Christ congregations began to emerge as a distinct group from the Disciples, although the break was not formalized until the late 1960s. By this time the decennial religious census was a thing of the past and could not be used as a delineation as it was in 1906.

Following World War II, it was believed that the organizations that had been developed in previous decades no longer effectively met the needs of the postwar era. After several discussions throughout the 1950s, the 1960 International Convention of Christian Churches adopted a process to plan the "restructure" of the entire organization. The Commission on Restructure, chaired by Granville T. Walker, held its first meeting October 30 and November 1, 1962. In 1968, at the International Convention of Christian Churches (Disciples of Christ), those Christian Churches that favored cooperative mission work adopted a new "provisional design" for their work together, becoming the Christian Church (Disciples of Christ). Those congregations that chose not to be associated with the new denominational organization went their own way as the unaffiliated Christian Church/Church of Christ congregations, completing a separation that had begun decades before.

The Disciples of Christ still have their own internal conservative-liberal tension. In 1985, a movement of conservative congregations and individuals among the Disciples formed the "Disciple Renewal." They thought that others in the Disciples fellowship had increasingly liberal views on issues such as the lordship of Christ, the authority of the Bible, and tolerance of homosexuality. In 1985 the Disciples General Assembly rejected a resolution on the inspiration of scripture; afterward, the Disciple Renewal planned to encourage renewal from within the fellowship through founding a journal entitled Disciple Renewal. Conservative members were concerned that the Disciples had abandoned the fundamental principles of the Restoration Movement.

In 1995 the Disciple Heritage Fellowship was established. It is a fellowship of autonomous congregations, about half of which are formally associated with the Disciples of Christ. As of 2002 the Disciples Heritage Fellowship included 60 congregations and 100 "supporting" churches. The Christian Church (Disciples of Christ) has experienced a significant loss of membership since the middle of the 20th century. Membership peaked in 1958 at just under 2 million. In 1993, membership dropped below 1 million. In 2009, the denomination reported 658,869 members in 3,691 congregations. As of 2010, the five states with the highest adherence rates were Kansas, Missouri, Iowa, Kentucky and Oklahoma. The states with the largest absolute number of adherents were Missouri, Texas, Indiana, Kentucky and Ohio.

== Subsequent development of the unaffiliated congregations ==
Independent Christian churches and churches of Christ have both organizational and hermeneutic differences with the Churches of Christ. For example, they have a loosely organized convention, and they view scriptural silence on an issue more permissively. Nonetheless, they are much more closely related to the Churches of Christ in their theology and ecclesiology than they are with the Christian Church (Disciples of Christ).

The development of the unaffiliated Christian Church/Church of Christ congregations as a separately identifiable religious body from the Christian Church (Disciples of Christ) was a lengthy process. The roots of the separation can be found in the polarization resulting from three major controversies that arose during the early 20th century. One, which was a source of division in other religious groups, was "the theological development of modernism and liberalism." The early stages of the ecumenical movement, which led in 1908 to the Federal Council of Churches, provide a second source of controversy. The third was the practice of open membership, in which individuals who had not been baptized by immersion were granted full membership in the church. Those who supported one of these points of view tended to support the others as well.

The Disciples of Christ were, in 1910, a united, growing community with common goals. Support by the United Christian Missionary Society of missionaries who advocated open membership became a source of contention in 1920. Efforts to recall support for these missionaries failed in a 1925 convention in Oklahoma City and a 1926 convention in Memphis, Tennessee. Many congregations withdrew from the missionary society as a result.

The North American Christian Convention was organized by the more conservative congregations in 1927. The Christian Standard served as a source of cohesion for these congregations. From the 1960s on, newer unaffiliated missionary organizations like the Christian Missionary Fellowship (today, Christian Missionary Fellowship International) were working more on a national scale in the United States to rally Christian Church/Church of Christ congregations in international missions. By this time the division between liberals and conservatives was well established.

The official separation between the independent Christian churches and Churches of Christ and the Christian Church (Disciples of Christ) is difficult to date. Suggestions range from 1926 to 1971 based on the events outlined below:

- 1926: The first North American Christian Convention in 1927 was the result of disillusionment at the Memphis convention.
- 1944: International Convention of Disciples elects as president a proponent of open membership
- 1948: The Commission on Restudy, appointed to help avoid a split, disbands
- 1955: The Directory of the Ministry was first published listing only the "Independents" on a voluntary basis.
- 1968: Final redaction of the Disciples Year Book removing Independent churches
- 1971: Independent churches listed separately in the Yearbook of American Churches.

Because of this separation, many independent Christian churches and Churches of Christ are not only non-denominational, they can be anti-denominational, avoiding even the appearance or language associated with denominationalism holding true to their Restoration roots.

== Subsequent development of the Churches of Christ ==
One of the issues leading to the 1906 separation was the question of organizational structures above the level of the local congregation. Since then, Churches of Christ have maintained an ongoing commitment to church governance that is congregational only, rather than denominational. Churches of Christ purposefully have no central headquarters, councils, or other organizational structure above the local church level. Rather, the independent congregations are a network with each congregation participating at its own discretion in various means of service and fellowship with other congregations (see Sponsoring church (Churches of Christ)). Churches of Christ are linked by their shared commitment to restoration principles.

Since Churches of Christ are autonomous and purposefully do not maintain an ecclesiastical hierarchy or doctrinal council, it is not unusual to find variations from congregation to congregation. There are many notable consistencies, however; for example, very few Church of Christ buildings display a cross, a practice common in other Christian churches. The approach taken to restoring the New Testament church has focused on "methods and procedures" such as church organization, the form of worship, and how the church should function. As a result, most divisions among Churches of Christ have been the result of "methodological" disputes. These are meaningful to members of this movement because of the seriousness with which they take the goal of "restoring the form and structure of the primitive church."

Three quarters of the congregations and 87% of the membership are described by The Encyclopedia of the Stone-Campbell Movement as "mainstream," sharing a consensus on practice and theology. The remaining congregations may be grouped into four categories which generally differ from the mainstream consensus in specific practices, rather than in theological perspectives, and tend to have smaller congregations on average. The largest of these four categories is the "non-institutional" Churches of Christ. This group is notable for opposing congregational support of institutions such as orphans homes and Bible colleges. Approximately 2,055 congregations fall in this category. The remaining three groups, whose congregations are generally considerably smaller than those of the mainstream or "non-institutional" groups, also oppose institutional support but differ from the "non-institutional" group by other beliefs and practices:

- One group opposes separate "Sunday school" classes; this group consists of approximately 1,100 congregations.
- Another group opposes the use of multiple communion cups (the term "one-cupper" is often used, sometimes pejoratively, to describe this group); there approximately 550 congregations in this group, and this group overlaps somewhat with those congregations that oppose separate Sunday school classes.
- The smallest group "emphasize[s] mutual edification by various leaders in the churches and oppose[s] one person doing most of the preaching." This group includes roughly 130 congregations.

While there are no official membership statistics for the Churches of Christ, growth appears to have been relatively steady through the 20th century. One source estimates total U.S. membership at 433,714 in 1926; 558,000 in 1936; 682,000 in 1946; 835,000 in 1965; and 1,250,000 in 1994.

=== Separation of the International Churches of Christ ===
The International Churches of Christ (ICOC) had their roots in a "discipling" movement that arose among the mainline Churches of Christ during the 1970s. This discipling movement developed in the campus ministry of Chuck Lucas. In 1967, Chuck Lucas was minister of the 14th Street Church of Christ in Gainesville, Florida (later renamed the Crossroads Church of Christ). That year he started a new project known as Campus Advance (based on principles borrowed from the Campus Crusade and the Shepherding movement). Centered on the University of Florida, the program called for a strong evangelistic outreach and an intimate religious atmosphere in the form of soul talks and prayer partners. Soul talks were held in student residences and involved prayer and sharing overseen by a leader who delegated authority over group members. Prayer partners refers to the practice of pairing a new Christian with an older guide for personal assistance and direction. Both procedures led to "in-depth involvement of each member in one another's lives," and critics accused Lucas of fostering cultism.

The Crossroads movement later spread into some other Churches of Christ congregations. One of Lucas' converts, Kip McKean, moved to the Boston area in 1979 and began working with the Lexington Church of Christ. He asked the congregation to "redefine their commitment to Christ," and introduced the use of discipling partners. The congregation grew rapidly and was renamed Boston Church of Christ. In the early 1980s, the focus of the movement moved to Boston where McKean and the Boston Church of Christ became prominently associated with the trend. With the national leadership located in Boston, during the 1980s it commonly became known as the "Boston movement."

In 1990 the Crossroads Church of Christ broke with the Boston movement and, through a letter written to The Christian Chronicle, attempted to restore relations with the mainline Churches of Christ. By the early 1990s some first-generation leaders had become disillusioned by the movement and left. The movement was first recognized as an independent religious group in 1992 when John Vaughn, a church growth specialist at Fuller Theological Seminary, listed them as a separate entity. Time magazine ran a full-page story on the movement in 1992 calling them "one of the world's fastest-growing and most innovative bands of Bible thumpers" that had grown into "a global empire of 103 congregations from California to Cairo with total Sunday attendance of 50,000".

A formal break was made from the mainline Churches of Christ in 1993 when the movement organized under the name "International Churches of Christ." This designation formalized a division that was already in existence between those involved with the Crossroads/Boston movement and "mainline" Churches of Christ. Other names that have been used for this movement include the "Multiplying Ministries" and the "Discipling Movement".

== Reunion efforts ==
Efforts have been made to restore unity among the various branches of the Restoration Movement. In 1984 a "Restoration Summit" was held at the Ozark Christian College, with 50 representatives of both the Churches of Christ and the unaffiliated Christian Church/Church of Christ congregations. Later meetings were open to all and were known as "Restoration Forums." Beginning in 1986 they have been held annually, generally in October or November, with the hosting venue alternating between the Churches of Christ and the Christian churches and churches of Christ. Topics discussed have included issues such as instrumental music, the nature of the church, and practical steps for promoting unity.

Efforts were made in the early 21st century to include representatives of the Christian Church (Disciples of Christ). These efforts followed the "Stone-Campbell Dialogue," which was a series of meetings beginning in 1999 that included representatives of all three major U.S. branches of the Restoration Movement. The first full meeting in 1999 included six representatives from each of the three traditions. Meetings were held twice annually, and in 2001 were expanded to include anyone associated with the Restoration Movement who was interested in attending. Also, special efforts were made in 2006 to create more intentional fellowship between the various branches of the Movement. This was in conjunction with the centennial anniversary of the "official" recognition of the split between the Christian Church and the Churches of Christ by the U.S. Census in 1906. One example of this was the hosting by Abilene Christian University (ACU) of the annual Restoration Unity Forum for 2006 as part of the university's annual Bible lectureship. During the program Don Jeanes, president of Milligan College and Royce Money, president of ACU, jointly gave a presentation on the first chapter of the Gospel of John. The 2004 ACU Lectureship included a forum with leaders from the Churches of Christ and the ICOC that included apologies from both groups.

== Churches outside North America ==
Restoration Movement churches are found around the world, and the World Convention of Churches of Christ provides many national profiles. Their genealogies are representative of developments in North America. Their theological orientation ranges from fundamentalist to liberal to ecumenical. In some places they have joined with churches of other traditions to form united churches at local, regional or national level.

A group in Nottingham withdrew from the Scotch Baptist church in 1836 to form a Church of Christ. James Wallis, a member of that group, founded a magazine named The British Millennial Harbinger in 1837. In 1842 the first Cooperative Meeting of Churches of Christ in Great Britain was held in Edinburgh. Approximately 50 congregations were involved, representing a membership of 1,600. The name "Churches of Christ" was formally adopted at an annual meeting in 1870. Alexander Campbell influenced the British Restoration Movement indirectly through his writings; he visited the Britain for several months in 1847, and "presided at the Second Cooperative Meeting of the British Churches at Chester." At that time the movement had grown to encompass 80 congregations with a total membership of 2,300. Annual meetings were held after 1847. The use of instrumental music in worship was not a source of division among the Churches of Christ in Great Britain before World War I. More significant was the issue of pacifism; a national conference was established in 1916 for congregations that opposed the war. A conference for "Old Paths" congregations was first held in 1924. The issues involved included concern that the Christian Association was compromising traditional principles in seeking ecumenical ties with other organizations and a sense that it had abandoned Scripture as "an all-sufficient rule of faith and practice." Two "Old Paths" congregations withdrew from the association in 1931; an additional two withdrew in 1934, and 19 more withdrew between 1943 and 1947. Membership declined rapidly during and after the First World War. The Association of Churches of Christ in Britain disbanded in 1980. Most association congregations (approximately 40) united with the United Reformed Church in 1981. In the same year, 24 other congregations formed a Fellowship of Churches of Christ. The fellowship developed ties with the unaffiliated Christian Church/Church of Christ congregations during the 1980s.

Historically, Restoration Movement groups from Great Britain were more influential than those from the United States in the early development of the movement in Australia. Churches of Christ grew up independently in several locations. While early Churches of Christ in Australia saw creeds as divisive, towards the end of the 19th century they began viewing "summary statements of belief" as useful in tutoring second generation members and converts from other religious groups. The period from 1875 through 1910 also saw debates over the use of musical instruments in worship, Christian Endeavor Societies and Sunday schools. Ultimately, all three found general acceptance in the movement. Currently, the Restoration Movement is not as divided in Australia as it is in the United States. There have been strong ties with the Christian Church (Disciples of Christ), but many conservative ministers and congregations associate with the unaffiliated Christian Church/Church of Christ congregations instead. Others have sought support from non-instrumental Churches of Christ, particularly those who felt that "conference" congregations had "departed from the restoration ideal." The Fellowship of Churches of Christ and some Australian and New Zealand Churches advocate a "missional" emphasis with an ideal of "five fold leadership." Many people in more traditional Churches of Christ see these groups as having more in common with Pentecostal churches. The main publishing organs of traditional Churches of Christ in Britain are The Christian Worker magazine and the Scripture Standard magazine.

There are believed to be more than 1 million members of the Churches of Christ in Africa. The total number of congregations is approximately 14,000. The most significant concentrations are in "Nigeria, Malawi, Ghana, Zambia, Zimbabwe, Ethiopia, South Africa and Kenya".

India has historically been a target for missionary efforts; estimates are that there are 2,000 or more Restoration Movement congregations in India, with a membership of approximately 1,000,000. More than 100 congregations exist in the Philippines. Growth in other Asian countries has been smaller but is still significant.

== See also ==
- History of Christianity
- Christianity in the 18th century
- Christianity in the 19th century
- New religious movement
- Non-denominational Christianity
- List of notable women of the Restoration Movement

=== Notable people ===
- Rice Haggard (1769–1819)
- Abner Jones (1772–1841)
- Thomas Campbell (1763–1854)
- Elijah Martindale (1793–1874), active in Indiana
- Amos Sutton Hayden (1813–1880)
- James A. Garfield (1831–1881), first Restoration Movement member to be elected United States President, the others being Lyndon B. Johnson (1908–1973) and Ronald Reagan (1911–2004)
- Marshall Keeble (1878–1968) His successful preaching career notably bridged a racial divide in the Restoration Movement prior to the American Civil Rights Movement.
- Caroline Neville Pearre
- John Oakes
- William Robinson

== Bibliography ==
- Allen, C Leonard; Hughes, Richard T (1988), Discovering Our Roots: The Ancestry of Churches of Christ, Abilene, TX: ACU Press.
- Fife, Robert Oldham (Fall 1999), "The Restoration Movement and the Ecumenical Movement", Leaven, vol. 7, no. 4.
- Foster, Douglas Allen; Dunnavant, Anthony L; Blowers, Paul M; et al., eds. (2004), The Encyclopedia of the Stone-Campbell Movement: Christian Church (Disciples of Christ), Christian Churches/Churches of Christ, Churches of Christ, Grand Rapids, MI: William B Eerdmans, ISBN 978-0-8028-3898-8, 854 pp.
- Foster, Douglas Allen; Reese, Jack; Childers, Jeff W (2000), The Crux of the Matter: Crisis, Tradition, and the Future of Churches of Christ, ACU Press, ISBN 0-89112-035-1.
- Garrett, Leroy (2002), The Stone-Campbell Movement: The Story of the American Restoration Movement, College Press, p. 104, ISBN 978-0-89900-909-4, 573 pp.
- Garrison, Winfred Earnest; DeGroot, Alfred T (1948), The Disciples of Christ, A History, St Louis, MO: The Bethany Press.
- Jones, Jerry (1991–93), What Does the Boston Movement Teach?, vol. 1–3, Bridgeton, MO: Jerry Jones, 12880 Bittick.
- Jennings, Walter Wilson (1919), Origin and Early History of the Disciples of Christ, Cincinnati: Standard.
- Morrill, Milo True (1912), History of the Christian Denomination in America, Dayton: The Christian Publishing Association.
- Murch, James DeForest (1962), Christians Only, Cincinnati: Standard.
- North, James B (1994), Union in Truth: An Interpretive History of the Restoration Movement, Cincinnati, OH: The Standard, ISBN 0-7847-0197-0.
- West, Earl Irvin (2002), The Search for the Ancient Order, vol. 1, Gospel Light, ISBN 0-89225-154-9.
- Wooten, Martin Edward (1990), The Boston Movement as a 'Revitalization Movement' (D.Min. thesis), Harding Graduate School of Religion.
- Yeakley, Flavil R, ed. (1988), The Discipling Dilemma: A Study of the Discipling Movement Among Churches of Christ, Nashville: Gospel Advocate.
- Zuber, Glenn (1993), "The Gospel of Temperance: Early Disciple Women Preachers and the WCTU", Discipliana, 53: 47–60.
- ——— (2002), "Mainline Women Ministers: Women Missionary and Temperance Organizers Become 'Disciples of Christ' Ministers, 1888–1908", in Casey, Michael; Foster, Douglas A (eds.), The Stone-Campbell Movement: An International Religious Tradition, pp. 292–316.
- ——— (2004), "Temperance", in Foster, Douglas Allen; Dunnavant, Anthony L; Blowers, Paul M; Williams, D Newell (eds.), The Encyclopedia of the Stone-Campbell Movement: Christian Church (Disciples of Christ), Christian Churches/Churches of Christ, Churches of Christ, Grand Rapids, MI: William B Eerdmans, pp. 728–9, ISBN 978-0-8028-3898-8.
- Department of Commerce and Labor, Bureau of the Census, ed. (1910), Religious Bodies, 1906, United States: United States Printing Office, p. 236.
