= John Smith (Restoration Movement) =

Early leader in the Restoration Movement

- "Raccoon John" Smith
- Born: 1784; Sullivan County, Tennessee, U.S.
- Died: February 28, 1868 (aged 83–84); Mexico, Missouri, U.S.
- Education: Self educated
- Occupation: American Christian minister
- Years active: 1808–1868
- Known for: Helping unite the Campbell and Stone Restoration movements
- Spouses: Anna Townsend, 1806-1815; Nancy Hurt, December 1815-

"Raccoon" John Smith (1784 – February 28, 1868) was an early leader in the Restoration Movement. His father, George Smith (originally Schmidt) was of German ancestry, and may have been born in Germany, while his mother, Rebecca Bowen Smith, was of Welsh and Irish ancestry. He played a critical role uniting the movement led by Thomas and Alexander Campbell with the similar movement led by Barton W. Stone and in spreading the message of the movement over much of Kentucky.

== Personal life ==
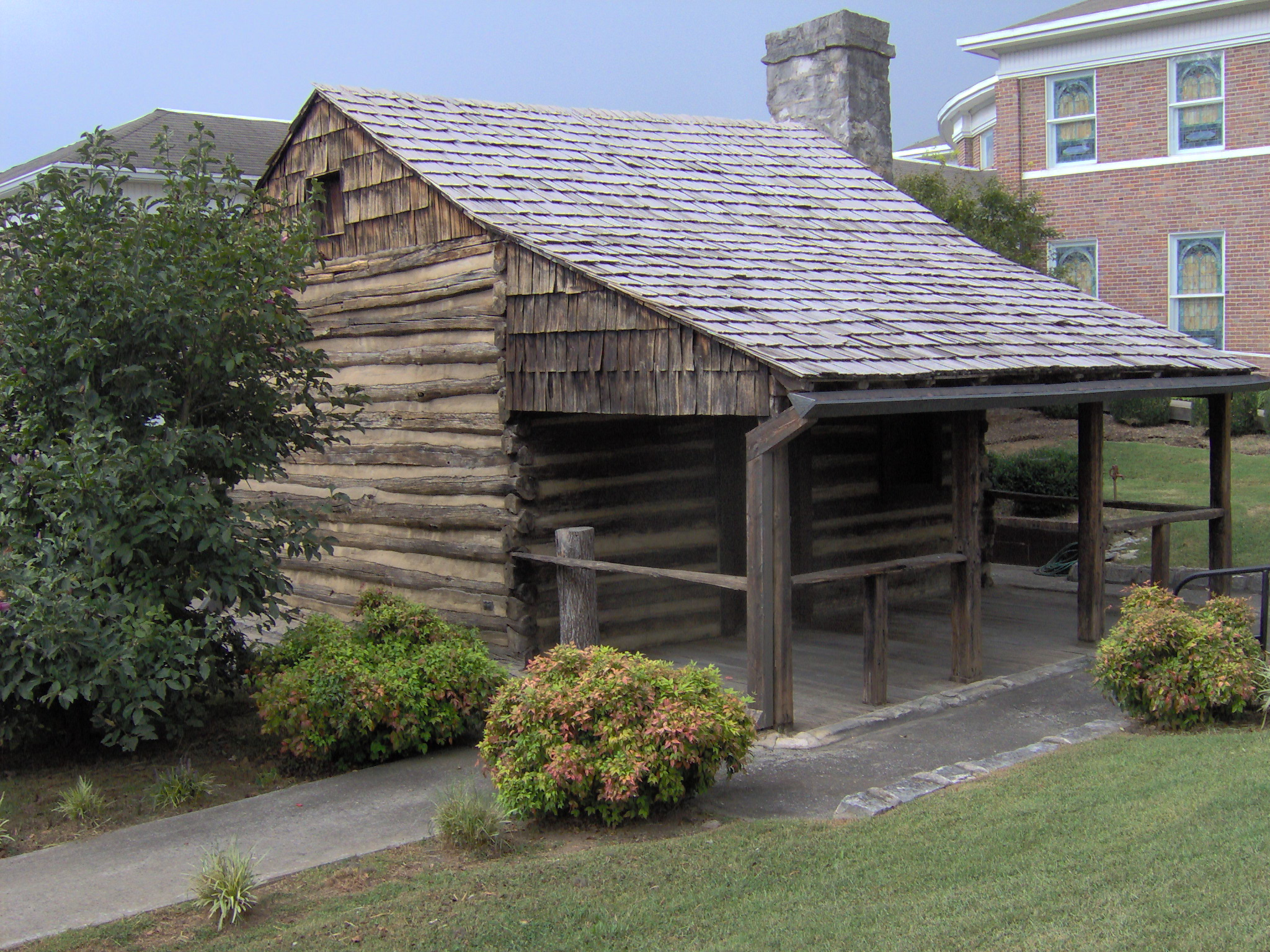
Log cabin in downtown Monticello, Kentucky, built in the early 19th century by "Raccoon" John Smith (1784–1868). The cabin was originally located in Horse Hollow on the Little South Fork River.

Smith was born in what is now Sullivan County, Tennessee, in 1784 to a family of Regular Baptists. His nickname, "Raccoon", reportedly resulted from him saying he lived in such a remote location that his only neighbors were raccoons. Smith moved with his family to what is now Clinton County, Kentucky. He was largely self-educated, with no more than six months of formal schooling. He was baptized in 1804, and ordained as a minister in 1808. Smith married Anna Townsend in 1806. They lost two of their four children to a cabin fire, and Anna died from shock shortly afterward in 1815. Smith remarried in December of the same year to Nancy Hurt.

As a preacher, Smith began to wrestle with the Calvinist teachings of predestination and total depravity as taught in The Philadelphia Confession of Faith. His doubts regarding these doctrines meant that when he met Alexander Campbell in 1824 he was open to the Restoration Movement themes that salvation is open to all based on faith in Christ, repentance from sin and baptism by immersion.

He died in Mexico, Missouri on February 28, 1868, and was buried next to Nancy.

The Raccoon John Smith House, in Owingsville, Kentucky, is listed on the National Register of Historic Places.

== Career ==
After meeting Alexander Campbell, Smith soon became a leader in the Restoration Movement, working primarily among the Baptists in Kentucky. Because preachers of the time were typically unpaid, he worked as a farmer for most of his life. He was willing, though, to go anywhere and preach to anyone who would listen and was successful in persuading many in Kentucky to join the movement.

He also played a key role in bringing the Stone and Campbell movements together in late 1832 and early 1833. This was formalized at the High Street Meeting House in Lexington, Kentucky, with a handshake between Barton Stone and Smith. Smith was selected by the audience to speak on behalf of the Campbells' supporters. A preliminary meeting of the two groups was held in late December 1831, culminating with the merger on January 1, 1832. Two representatives of those assembled were appointed to carry the news of the union to all the churches: John Rogers, for those associated with Stone; and Smith for those associated with the Campbells. They spent three years reporting the news to the associated churches. Despite some challenges, the merger succeeded. Many believed the union held great promise for the future success of the combined movement and greeted the news enthusiastically. Smith spent three years traveling through Kentucky with Rogers encouraging congregations associated with the Stone and Campbell movements to unite.
