= Millennial Harbinger =

- Editor: Alexander Campbell
- Categories: Restoration Movement
- Frequency: Monthly
- First issue: January 1, 1830
- Final issue: 1870
- Country: United States
- Based in: Bethany, West Virginia
- Language: English

The Millennial Harbinger was a religious magazine established by the early Restoration Movement leader Alexander Campbell in 1830. Campbell viewed the magazine as an important vehicle for promoting the religious reforms that he believed would help usher in the millennium.

== History ==
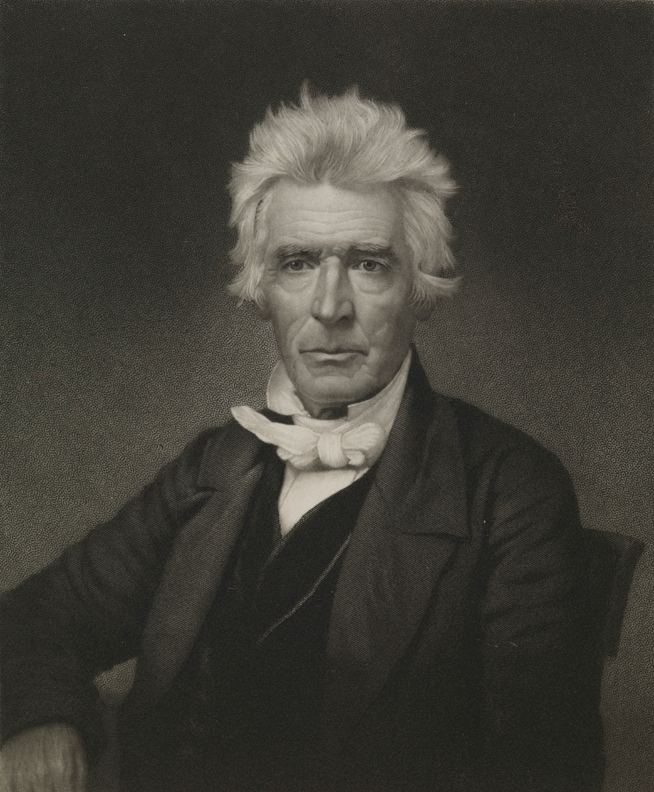
Alexander Campbell

Campbell began publishing the Harbinger on January 1, 1830, and it soon became a leading forum for the Restoration Movement during the period prior to the Civil War. The Harbinger was intended as a successor to Campbell's prior magazine, the Christian Baptist, even though he published both magazines during the first seven months of 1830. Campbell had become concerned about the denominational associations suggested by the name of the Christian Baptist. Differences of opinion were arising between Campbell and the Baptists, and in many cases Baptist associations were expelling those who were associated with the Campbell movement. He was concerned that "Christian Baptist" - which he considered to be less appropriate than the biblical term "Disciples" - was becoming the de facto name of the group. He also wanted the new journal to have a more positive tone, promoting reform and preparing the world for the second coming of Christ. During the 1830s the Harbinger provided reporting on the merger of the Disciples of Christ (Campbell Movement) with the Christians (Stone Movement). During the 1840s Campbell used the Harbinger to urge greater cooperation between congregations and to avoid polarization and fragmentation of the movement over the issue of slavery.

Campbell became less active in publishing the Harbinger during the late 1850s, turning most of the work over to his son-in-law W. K. Pendleton. Pendleton continued publishing the Harbinger after Campbell's death in 1866. Increased competition led to the Harbinger's decline, and Pendleton discontinued publishing it in 1870.

== See also ==
- The British Millennial Harbinger
