= Church of Christ =

Church of Christ may refer to:

== Church groups ==
- Christianity, the Abrahamic monotheistic religion based on the life and teachings of Jesus Christ
- Christian Church, an ecclesiological term used by denominations to describe the true body of Christians, can include only the denomination itself or a larger group of Christians from multiple denominations or traditions

=== Restoration Movement ===
- The Restoration Movement originated on the American frontier in the early 19th century, many congregations used the name "Church of Christ" along with a geographic descriptor. The Restoration Movement has split into several different groups and denominations, all of which have used the term "Church of Christ" or "Churches of Christ". These include:
  - Churches of Christ, a conservative group of congregations distinguished by their prohibition of instrumental music in worship
    - Churches of Christ (non-institutional), an identifiable subgroup within the Churches of Christ which opposes organizations beyond the local congregation
    - International Churches of Christ, a group of churches that split off from the main Churches of Christ in the 1970s and 1980s
      - International Christian Church, a group of churches that split off from the International Churches of Christ in the early 2000s
  - Christian churches and churches of Christ, a conservative group of congregations often referred to as "Independents" due to their official separation from the Christian Church (Disciples of Christ) in the mid-20th century. These churches can often be distinguished from the Churches of Christ by their use of instrumental music in worship.
  - Christian Church (Disciples of Christ), a mainline Protestant denomination in the United States and Canada. Historically many of its congregations used the name "Church of Christ". After the Churches of Christ were recognized as a distinct group in 1906, congregations using "Church of Christ" that remained with the portion of the movement that would become the Disciples slowly changed their name to Christian Church during the first half of the 20th century
  - Churches of Christ in Europe, a group of churches in Europe with connections to the Restoration Movement of the United States. Most Restoration Movement congregations in the United Kingdom have been part of the United Reformed Church since 1981.
  - Churches of Christ in Australia, a denomination in Australia influenced by the Restoration Movement in the United States and the United Kingdom. Part of the Disciples Ecumenical Consultative Council.
  - Evangelical Christian Church in Canada, a small denomination in Canada with roots in the Restoration Movement
- The World Convention of Churches of Christ is a global convention of the Churches of Christ, Christian Churches and Christian churches and churches of Christ, and Christian Church (Disciples of Christ)
- Other historically-related groups:
  - Christian Connection, a group of churches begun in the 1790s which briefly combined with the group of Christians led by Barton W. Stone in Kentucky during the early 19th century. When Stone united with the Disciples led by Alexander Campbell to form the mainstream Restoration Movement most churches from the Christian Connection remained separate, later becoming part of the Congregational Christian Churches in 1931 and then the United Church of Christ in 1957. The UCC has since entered into a full communion agreement with the Christian Church (Disciples of Christ), reuniting congregations with roots in the Christian Connection with the mainline Restoration Movement denomination.
  - Christadelphians, a movement which split off from the mainstream Restoration Movement in the mid-19th century
  - Churches of Christ in Christian Union, a small denomination with roots in the Wesleyan Holiness movement and Restoration Movement

=== Latter-day Saint denominations ===
- Church of Christ (Latter-day Saints), the original church founded by Joseph Smith, Jr. on April 6, 1830
- Pure Church of Christ, the first schismatic sect in the Latter Day Saint movement, this denomination was organized in 1831 in Kirtland, Ohio, by Wycam Clark and Northrop Sweet and is now extinct
- Church of Christ (Ezra Booth), an extinct schismatic sect organized in 1836 by Ezra Booth in Kirtland, Ohio
- Church of Christ (Parrishite), an extinct Latter Day Saint denomination organized in 1837 by Warren Parrish in Kirtland, Ohio
- Church of Christ (William Chubby), an extinct Latter Day Saint denomination organized in the Late 1830s by William Chubby
- Church of Christ (Hiram Page), an extinct Latter Day Saint denomination organized in 1842 by Hiram Page, one of the Eight Witnesses to the Book of Mormon's golden plates
- Church of Christ (Wightite), this denomination, founded by Lyman Wight in 1844, split from the Church of Christ (Latter Day Saints) at the death of Joseph Smith
- Church of Christ (Temple Lot), informally referred to as "Hedrickites", this denomination is headquartered in Independence, Missouri, on what is known as the Temple Lot; it was founded by Granville Hedrick in July 1863
- Church of Christ (Fettingite), informally referred to as the "Fettingites", after its founder Otto Fetting, this denomination is split from the Church of Christ (Temple Lot) in 1929
- Church of Christ with the Elijah Message, which broke away from the Temple Lot church in 1929
- Church of Christ (Restored), this denomination split from the Church of Christ (Fettingite) in the late 1930s under the leadership of A. C. DeWolf
- Church of Christ at Halley's Bluff, which broke away from the Temple Lot church in 1932
- Church of Christ (Hancock), founded by Pauline Hancock, this denomination is split from the Church of Christ (Temple Lot) in 1946
- Church of Christ (Whitmerite), a denomination, founded in 1847 and reformed 1871, based on the claims of David Whitmer, one of the Three Witnesses to the Book of Mormon
- Church of Christ (Brewsterite), a denomination founded in 1848 by James C. Brewster and Hazen Aldrich
- Latter Day Church of Christ, a Mormon fundamentalist denomination based in Utah
- Church of Christ (David Clark), also known as "Lion of God Ministry"; Clark broke from the Reorganized Church of Jesus Christ of Latter Day Saints in November 1985
- Church of Christ (Leighton-Floyd/Burt) - This denomination, founded by Howard Leighton-Floyd and H. H. Burt in 1965, split from the Church of Christ with the Elijah Message

=== Others ===
- Churches of Christ in Europe, autonomous congregations using the name "church of Christ" that have no historical connection to the Restoration Movement
- Church of Christ, Instrumental, also known as the Kelleyites, a Baptist denomination in Arkansas
- Church of Christ, Scientist, also known as Christian Science

=== Country-specific churches known as Church of Christ ===
- Church of Christ in Congo, the administrative and spiritual union of denominations in the Democratic Republic of the Congo
- Church of Christ in Thailand, the largest Protestant Church in Thailand.
- Iglesia ni Cristo (Filipino translation for "Church of Christ"), an independent church originating in the Philippines
- United Church of Christ in the Philippines, the largest Protestant group in the Philippines
- United Church of Christ – Congregational in the Marshall Islands, the largest religious group in the Marshall Islands
- United Church of Christ, a mainline Protestant denomination in the United States amalgamated from four congregationalist groups in 1957 (see also Christian Connection)

== Individual church buildings or congregations ==
In Denmark:

- Church of Christ, a church in the Vesterbro district of Copenhagen

In the United States:

- Church of Christ (Guy, Arkansas), listed on the NRHP in Arkansas and associated with the Churches of Christ.
- Church of Christ (Perry, Illinois), listed on the NRHP in Illinois
- Church of Christ (Revere, Massachusetts), listed on the NRHP in Massachusetts
- Church of Christ, Swansea, Massachusetts, listed on the NRHP in Massachusetts
- Church of Christ in LaRoche Township, Academy, South Dakota, listed on the NRHP in South Dakota.

== See also ==
- Church of Jesus Christ (disambiguation)
- First Church of Christ (disambiguation)
- Church of God
- Churches of God General Conference (Winebrenner)
