= Common Era =

Era names equivalent to AD/BC

Today (at UTC+00)
- Friday, 6 November 2026
- Common Era: 6 November 2026 CE
Other calendars
| Akan | Monofie |
| Armenian | 19 Trē 1476 |
| Aztec | Atlcahualo 15, 2 Tōchtli |
| Babylonian | 24 Tashritu, 2337 SE |
| Balinese pawukon | Luang, Pepet, Kajeng, Laba, Paing, Maulu, Sukra of Sinta, Brahma, Gigis, Manuh |
| Bengali | 21 Kartik, BS 1433 |
| Chinese | Yang Wood Monkey・Ghost Mansion; Fire Horse Year, Month 9, Day 28 (Shuangjiang, 1 day until Lidong) |
| Coptic | 27 Paopi, AM 1743 |
| Egyptian | 24 Phamenoth, 2775 NE |
| Ethiopian | 27 Ṭeqemt, 2019 Amätä Məhrät |
| French Republican | Décade II, Quintidi de Brumaire de l'Année 235 de la République |
| Gregorian | 6 November, AD 2026 |
| Hebrew | 26 Cheshvan, AM 5787 |
| Hindu | Hasta・Vaidhṛti; Solar: 20 Kārtika, 1948 SE; Lunisolar: Dvādaśī, Kṛishna pakṣa of Āśvina, 2083 VE; Rāudra・5127 KY・1,872,885 |
| Icelandic | Föstudagur, 14 Gormánuður 2026 |
| Islamic | 25 Jumada al-awwal, AH 1448 (using tabular method) |
| ISO week date | 2026-W45-5 |
| Japanese | 27 Nagatsuki, Reiwa 8 (Sōkō, 1 day until Rittō) |
| Julian | 24 October, AD 2026 (AM 7535) |
| Julian day | 2461351 |
| Korean | 27 Gaedal, 4359 DE |
| Maya | 13.0.14.1.8; 1 Ceh, 2 Lamat |
| Roman | ante diem IX Kalendas Novembres, MMDCCLXXIX AUC |
| Solar Hijri | 15 Aban, SH 1405 |
| Tibetan | 27 tha skar, me pho rta 2153 or 1772 or 1000 |

Common Era (CE) and Before the Common Era (BCE) are conventions used in the Gregorian or Julian calendar to specify whether the year is before or after the epoch. They correspond exactly to Anno Domini (AD) and Before Christ (BC): "2026 CE" is the same year as "AD 2026", as are "400 BCE" and "400 BC". BCE/CE are used to avoid religious associations by not referring to Jesus as Dominus ('Lord'). (Note: AD is shortened from anno Domini nostri Jesu Christi ("in the year of Our Lord Jesus Christ").)

== History ==
=== Anno Domini ===
Around the year 525, the Christian monk Dionysius Exiguus devised the principle of taking the moment that he believed to be the date of the incarnation of Jesus to be the point from which years are numbered (the epoch) of the Christian ecclesiastical calendar. Dionysius labeled the column of the table in which he introduced the new era as "Anni Domini Nostri Jesu Christi" ('the years of our Lord Jesus Christ'). He did this to replace the Era of the Martyrs system (then used for some Easter tables) because he did not wish to continue the memory of the tyrant who persecuted Christians.

This way of numbering years became more widespread in Europe, with Bede using it in England in 731. Bede also introduced the practice of dating years before 1 backwards without a year zero. (Note: As noted in the history of zero, the use of zero in Western civilization was uncommon before the twelfth century. Two other systems that also do not use religious titles, the astronomical system and the ISO 8601 standard, do use zero. The year 1 BCE (or BC) is 0 in these systems, and 2 BCE is -1.) The use of AD, BC, or any other abbreviations did not happen until much later.

=== Vulgar Era ===
The term vulgar era was used in both English and Latin for AD, and can be translated into modern English as common era. The word "vulgar" originally meant "of the ordinary people", with no derogatory associations.

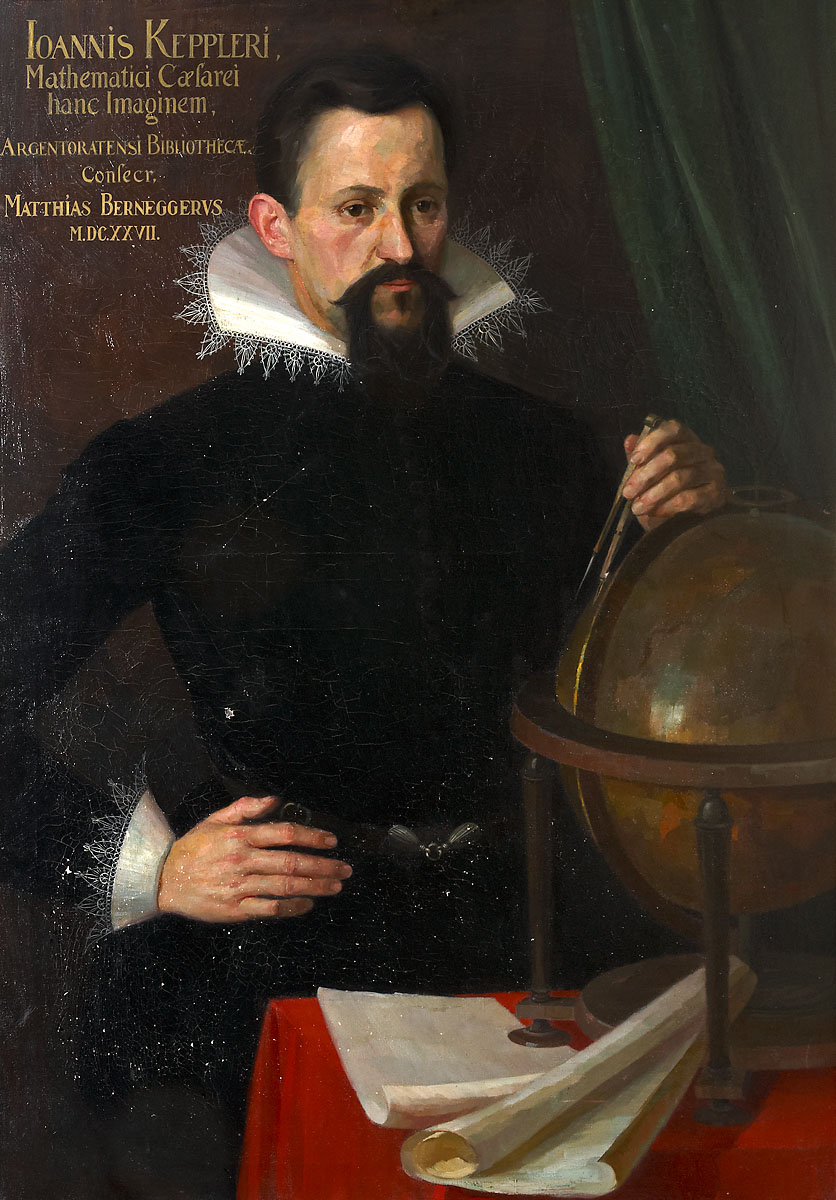
Johannes Kepler (1571–1630), the German astronomer, mathematician, astrologer, natural philosopher and writer on music

The first use of the Latin term anno aerae nostrae vulgaris (Note: In Latin, 'Common Era' is written as Aera Vulgaris. It also occasionally appears, in Latin declination, as æræ vulgaris, aerae vulgaris, aeram vulgarem, anni vulgaris, vulgaris aerae Christianae, and anni vulgatae nostrae aerae Christianas.) may be in a 1615 book by Johannes Kepler. Kepler's intent was to distinguish the Anno Domini era, which was in popular use, from the dates of the German regnal year—i.e., the year of the reign of a sovereign—typically used in national law. Kepler used it again, as ab Anno vulgaris aerae, in a 1616 table of ephemerides, as well as in 1617 (albeit as ab anno vulgaris aerae). An English-language 1635 edition of that book, in its title page, may contain the earliest known use of "Vulgar Era". (Note: As England did not adopt the Gregorian calendar until 1752, "vulgar" dates were determined according to the Julian calendar.) A 1701 book edited by John le Clerc includes the phrase "Before Christ according to the Vulgar Æra, 6".

The Merriam-Webster Dictionary gives 1716 as the date of first use of the term "vulgar era" (which it defines as "Christian era"). (Note: The probable source is a 1716 book in English by Dean Humphrey Prideaux which refers to, "...the vulgar Æra of Christ's incarnation and not from the true time of it." This citation is given in the 1933 edition of Oxford English Dictionary but without any assertion of first use.)

In 1835, in his book Living Oracles, Alexander Campbell wrote: "The vulgar Era, or Anno Domini; the fourth year of Jesus Christ, the first of which was but eight days".

=== Common Era ===
The English phrase Common Era appears at least as early as 1708, and in a 1715 book on astronomy, it is used (but with "of Christ" added). The phrase before the common era may have first appeared in a 1770 work that also uses common era and vulgar era as synonyms in a translation of a book originally written in German. The 1797 edition of the Encyclopædia Britannica uses the terms vulgar era and common era synonymously. In 1835 Alexander Campbell refers to the common era as a synonym: "the fact that our Lord was born on the 4th year before the vulgar era, called Anno Domini, thus making (for example) the 42d year from his birth to correspond with the 38th of the common era". The Catholic Encyclopedia (1909), in at least one article, reports three terms (Christian, Vulgar, Common) being commonly understood by the early 20th century.

The phrase common era, in lower case, also appeared in the 19th century in a "generic" sense, not necessarily to refer to AD, but to any system of dates in everyday use throughout a civilization. Thus, "the common era (or æra) of the Jews", "the common era of the Mahometans", "common era of the world", or "the common era of the foundation of Rome". When it did refer to AD it was sometimes qualified (e.g., "common era of the Incarnation", "common era of the Nativity", or "common era of the birth of Christ").

An adapted translation of Common Era into Latin as Era Vulgaris (Note: era – or, with a macron, ēra – being an alternative form of aera; aera is the usual form) was adopted in the 20th century by some followers of Aleister Crowley, and thus the abbreviation "e.v." or "EV" may sometimes be seen as a replacement for AD.

=== Judaism ===
Although Jews have the Hebrew calendar, they often use the Gregorian calendar without the AD prefix, as Judaism does not recognize Jesus as the Messiah. As early as 1825, the abbreviation VE (for Vulgar Era) was in use among Jews to denote years in the Western calendar. Common Era has been in use for Hebrew lessons since before 1905. Jews have also used the term Current Era.

== Contemporary usage ==
Some academics in the fields of theology, education, archaeology and history have adopted CE and BCE notation despite some disagreement. A study conducted in 2014 found that the BCE/CE notation is not growing at the expense of BC and AD notation in the scholarly literature, and that both notations were used in a relatively stable fashion.

=== Australia ===
In 2011, media reports suggested that the BC/AD notation in Australian school textbooks would be replaced by BCE/CE notation. The change drew opposition from some politicians and church leaders. Weeks after the story broke, the Australian Curriculum, Assessment and Reporting Authority denied the rumours and stated that the BC/AD notation would remain, with CE and BCE as an optional suggested learning activity.

=== Canada ===
In 2013, the Canadian Museum of Civilization (now the Canadian Museum of History) in Gatineau (opposite Ottawa), which had previously switched to BCE/CE, decided to change back to BC/AD in material intended for the public while retaining BCE/CE in academic content.

=== Nepal ===
The CE notation is in particularly common use in Nepal, because of the need to disambiguate between this calendar and the local version of the Hindu calendar, the Vikram or Bikram Sambat. Disambiguation is needed because its epoch is quite close to that of the Common Era.

=== United Kingdom ===
In 2002, an advisory panel for the religious education syllabus for England and Wales recommended introducing BCE/CE dates to schools, and by 2018 some local education authorities were using them.

In 2018, the National Trust said it would continue to use BC/AD as its house style. English Heritage explains its era policy thus: "It might seem strange to use a Christian calendar system when referring to British prehistory, but the BC/AD labels are widely used and understood." Some parts of the BBC use BCE/CE, but some presenters have said they will not. As of October 2019, the BBC News style guide has entries for AD and BC, but not for CE or BCE. The style guide for The Guardian says, under the entry for CE/BCE: "some people prefer CE (common era, current era, or Christian era) and BCE (before common era, etc.) to AD and BC, which, however, remain our style".

=== United States ===
In the United States, the use of the BCE/CE notation in textbooks was reported in 2005 to be growing. Some publications have transitioned to using it exclusively. For example, the 2007 World Almanac was the first edition to switch to BCE/CE, ending a period of 138 years in which the traditional BC/AD dating notation was used. BCE/CE is used by the College Board in its history tests, and by the Norton Anthology of English Literature. Others have taken a different approach. The US-based History Channel uses BCE/CE notation in articles on non-Christian religious topics such as Jerusalem and Judaism. The 2006 style guide for the Episcopal Diocese Maryland Church News says that BCE and CE should be used. The US-based Society of Biblical Literature style guide for academic texts on religion prefers BCE/CE to BC/AD.

In June 2006, in the United States, the Kentucky State School Board reversed its decision to use BCE and CE in the state's new Program of Studies, leaving education of students about these concepts a matter of local discretion.

== Rationales ==
=== Support ===
The use of CE in Jewish scholarship was historically motivated by the desire to avoid the implicit "Our Lord" in the abbreviation AD. Although other aspects of dating systems are based in Christian origins, AD is a direct reference to Jesus as Lord. Proponents of the Common Era notation assert that the use of BCE/CE shows sensitivity to those who use the same year numbering system as the one that originated with and is used by Christians, but who are not themselves Christian. Former Secretary-General of the United Nations Kofi Annan has argued:

[T]he Christian calendar no longer belongs exclusively to Christians. People of all faiths have taken to using it simply as a matter of convenience. There is so much interaction between people of different faiths and cultures – different civilizations, if you like – that some shared way of reckoning time is a necessity. And so the Christian Era has become the Common Era.

Adena K. Berkowitz, in her application to argue before the United States Supreme Court, opted to use BCE and CE because, "Given the multicultural society that we live in, the traditional Jewish designations—B.C.E. and C.E.—cast a wider net of inclusion." In the World History Encyclopedia, Joshua J. Mark wrote "Non-Christian scholars, especially, embraced [CE and BCE] because they could now communicate more easily with the Christian community. Jewish, Islamic, Hindu and Buddhist scholars could retain their [own] calendar but refer to events using the Gregorian Calendar as BCE and CE without compromising their own beliefs about the divinity of Jesus of Nazareth." In History Today, Michael Ostling wrote: "BC/AD Dating: In the year of whose Lord? The continuing use of AD and BC is not only factually wrong but also offensive to many who are not Christians."

=== Opposition ===
Critics note that there is no difference in the epoch of the two systems—both chosen to be close to the date of birth of Jesus. Since the year numbers are the same, the use of BCE and CE dates should be equally offensive to adherents of religions other than Christianity as the use of BC and AD dates. Roman Catholic priest and writer on interfaith issues Raimon Panikkar argued that the BCE/CE usage is the less inclusive option since the notation still uses the Christian calendar numbers, forcing it on non-Christian nations and individuals. In 1993, the English-language expert Kenneth G. Wilson speculated a slippery slope scenario in his style guide: "If we do end by casting aside the AD/BC convention, almost certainly some will argue that we ought to cast aside as well the conventional numbering system [that is, the method of numbering years] itself, given its Christian basis."

== Conventions in style guides ==
The abbreviation BCE, just as with BC, always follows the year number. Unlike AD, which still often precedes the year number, CE always follows the year number (if context requires that it be written at all). For example, the year may be written as 2026 in both notations (or, if further clarity is needed, as 2026 CE, or as AD 2026), and the year that Socrates died is represented as 399 BCE (the same year as 399 BC in the BC/AD notation). The abbreviations are sometimes written with small capital letters (e.g., "BCE") or with periods (e.g., "C.E.").

== Similar conventions in other languages ==
- In Germany, Jews in Berlin seem to have already been using words translating to "(before the) common era" in the 18th century, while others like Moses Mendelssohn opposed this usage as it would hinder the integration of Jews into German society. The formulation seems to have persisted among German Jews in the 19th century in forms like vor der gewöhnlichen Zeitrechnung (before the common chronology). In 1938 Nazi Germany, the use of this convention was also prescribed by the National Socialist Teachers League. However, it was soon discovered that many German Jews had been using the convention ever since the 18th century, and Time magazine found it ironic to see "Aryans following Jewish example nearly 200 years later".
- In Spanish, common forms used for "BC" are a. C. and a. de C. (for "antes de Cristo", "before Christ"), with variations in punctuation and sometimes the use of J. C. (Jesucristo) instead of C. The Real Academia Española also acknowledges the use of a. n. e. (antes de nuestra era, 'before our era') and d. n. e. (después de nuestra era, 'after our era'). In scholarly writing, a. e. c. is the equivalent of the English "BCE", "antes de la era común" or "Before the Common Era".
- In Welsh, OC can be expanded to equivalents of both AD (Oed Crist) and CE (Oes Cyffredin); for dates before the Common Era, CC (traditionally, Cyn Crist) is used exclusively.
- In Russian since the October Revolution (1917) до н.э. (до нашей эры, lit. before our era) and н.э. (нашей эры, lit. of our era) are used almost universally. Within Christian churches до Р.Х./от Р.Х. (до/от Рождества Христова, i.e. before/after the birth of Christ, equivalent to Latin: Ante Christum natum) remains in use.
- In Polish, "p.n.e." (przed naszą erą, lit. before our era) and "n.e." (naszej ery, lit. of our era) are commonly used in historical and scientific literature. Przed Chrystusem (before Christ) and po Chrystusie (after Christ) see sporadic usage, mostly in religious publications.
- In China, upon the foundation of the Republic of China, the Government in Nanking adopted the Republic of China calendar with 1912 designated as year 1, but used the Western calendar for international purposes. The translated term was Chinese: 西元 (xī yuán, "Western Era"), which is still used in Taiwan in formal documents. In 1949, the People's Republic of China adopted 公元 (gōngyuán, "Common Era") for both internal and external affairs in mainland China. This notation was extended to Hong Kong in 1997 and to Macau in 1999 (de facto extended in 1966) through Annex III of the Hong Kong Basic Law and the Macau Basic Law, thus eliminating the ROC calendar in these areas. BCE is translated into Chinese as 公元前 (gōngyuánqián, "Before the Common Era").
- In Czech, the "n. l." (našeho letopočtu which translates as of our year count) and "př. n. l." or "před n. l." (před naším letopočtem meaning before our year count) is used, always after the year number. The direct translation of AD (léta Páně, abbreviated as L. P.) or BC (před Kristem, abbreviated as př. Kr.) is seen as archaic.
- In Croatian the common form used for BC and AD are pr. Kr. (prije Krista, "before Christ") and p. Kr. (poslije Krista, after Christ). The abbreviations pr. n. e. (prije nove ere, before new era) and n. e. (nove ere, (of the) new era) have also been in usage.
- In Danish, "f.v.t." (før vor tidsregning, before our time reckoning) and "e.v.t." (efter vor tidsregning, after our time reckoning) are used as BCE/CE are in English. Also commonly used are "f.Kr." (før Kristus, before Christ) and "e.Kr." (efter Kristus, after Christ), which are both placed after the year number in contrast with BC/AD in English.
- In Macedonian, the terms "п.н.е." (пред нашата ера "before our era") and "н.е." (наша ера "our era") are used in every aspect.
- In Estonian, "e.m.a." (enne meie ajaarvamist, before our time reckoning) and "m.a.j." (meie ajaarvamise järgi, according to our time reckoning) are used as BCE and CE, respectively. Also in use are terms "eKr" (enne Kristust, before Christ) and "pKr" (pärast Kristust, after Christ). In all cases, the abbreviation is written after the year number.
- In Finnish, "eaa." (ennen ajanlaskun alkua, before time reckoning) and "jaa." (jälkeen ajanlaskun alun, after the start of time reckoning) are used as BCE and CE, respectively. Also (decreasingly) in use are terms "eKr" (ennen Kristusta, before Christ) and "jKr". (jälkeen Kristuksen, after Christ). In all cases, the abbreviation is written after the year number.

== See also ==
- Astronomical year numbering
- Before Present
- Calendar
- Calendar reform
- Holocene Era
- List of calendars
