= Waterloo Bible College =

Evangelical seminary in Canada

Coordinates: 43.47198°N 80.51083°W

Waterloo Bible College is a conservative, evangelical, Stone-Campbell Restoration Movement college and seminary in Waterloo, Ontario, Canada, training clergy for the Evangelical Christian Church in Canada.

== History ==
Waterloo Bible College (WBC) was founded in 1998 under the name, School of Christian Ministry. Its current president is Dr. David Lavigne.

== Programs ==
The purpose of Waterloo Bible College is to train new leadership for the Evangelical Christian Church. The college offers post-secondary, distance education and classroom diploma programmes to believers and clergy who wish to complete their ministerial training to enter ministry.

== School network ==
Waterloo Bible College offers courses covering each area of the five-fold ministry to serve the church as a network, especially in various cultural settings, in restoring the church to the New Testament model found in the Book of Acts.

== Affiliation ==
Waterloo Bible College is affiliated with the Evangelical Christian Church in Canada, a non-denominational, Canadian religious body that was founded in 1804 under the leadership of The Evangelical Christian Church (Christian Disciples) by Barton Stone and Alexander Campbell, from within the Restoration Movement. Waterloo Bible College is also affiliated with other Restoration Movement schools known as Philadelphia Christian University.

== Faculty ==
- Dr. David Lavigne - President
- Dr. Steve Smethers - Director
- Dr. Gary Barkman - Director
- Dr. Andrew Cha - Director
