= Pearre =

Pearre is a surname. Notable people with the name include:

- Caroline Neville Pearre (1834–1910), American Christian
- Charles Pearre Cabell (1903–1971), United States Air Force General and Deputy Director of the Central Intelligence Agency
- George Alexander Pearre (1860–1923), American politician

== See also ==
- Pearre-Metcalfe House, is a historic home located at New Windsor, Frederick County, Maryland, United States
