= Declaration and Address =

Founding document for a religious association

Declaration and address
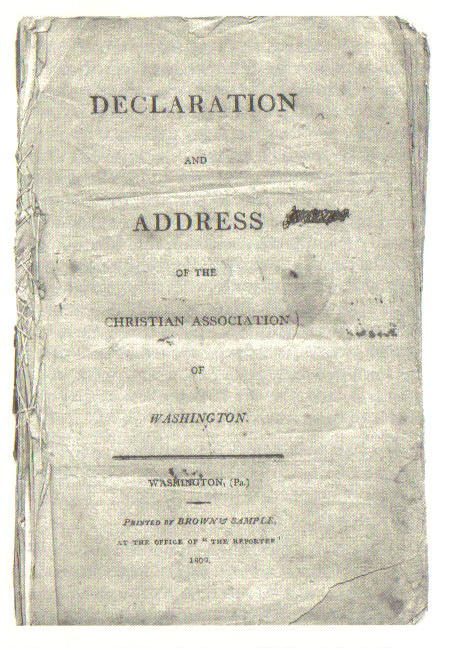
- Declaration and Address, published December 1809

- Location within Pennsylvania
- 40.16908°N 80.2448°W

The Declaration and Address was written by Thomas Campbell in 1809. It was first published in Washington, Pennsylvania, in 1809. It was the founding document for the Christian Association of Washington, a religious association that was a precursor to the Restoration Movement. In many ways, Thomas Campbell was before his time. He had an ecumenical spirit long before the ecumenical movement began. The Declaration and Address is a testimony to his appeal for Christian unity.

== Historical background ==
=== Thomas Campbell ===
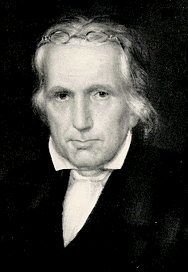
Thomas Campbell

Thomas Campbell (1763–1854) began his career as a Presbyterian minister. After serving in Ireland for a while, he migrated to the American frontier in 1807. A number of his associates from Ireland lived in Pennsylvania, and the Presbyterian church accepted his request to be stationed in Pennsylvania. He had high expectations for the American frontier; he felt it represented a new life and a new era for the church. As such, he was often seen as an unorthodox minister. His position as a minister under the Presbyterian Synod of Pennsylvania only lasted 2 years. He was reprimanded for certain "irregularities", including offering communion to Presbyterians outside of his Synod's jurisdiction.

Campbell continued his ministerial practices despite the Synod's disciplinary actions. Both his conflict with the Presbyterians and his desire for a united church led him to organize the Christian Association of Washington. This organization's main purpose was promoting "simple evangelical christianity, free from all mixture of human opinions and inventions of men." It was Campbell's hope that the Association would instigate a religious reformation. While this did not occur immediately, the Association did lead directly to the Restoration movement and the formation of the Disciples of Christ, who have been a continuing force for reformation and ecumenism.

=== Christian Association of Washington and beyond ===
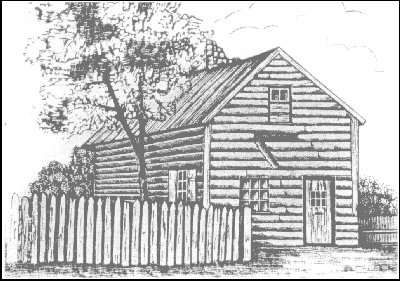
First Meeting house of the Disciples in Brush Run, Pennsylvania. It was built in 1810 by the Christian Association of Washington.

The Christian Association of Washington consisted of Thomas Campbell and 21 of his associates. During their second meeting, the committee decided that a document should be drafted outlining the purpose and function of the Association. The Declaration and Address was drafted by Campbell and read at a special meeting in September 1809. Ideally, this association, which promoted "simple evangelical Christianity", would also create similar associations elsewhere. The founders' vision was that a grassroots movement would spring up and spread from the Eastern states to the vast expanses of the Western frontier, ushering in a brand new age for the church.

These grand expectations were never fulfilled. The Christian Association of Washington quickly abandoned the title "association" on May 4, 1811, becoming the Brush Run Church. The Declaration and Address had passed with little notice from the greater world. Similarly, the Christian Association of Washington was simply not accepted in the religious realm. Since their experiment failed to produce the desired results, Thomas Campbell (along with his more influential son Alexander) felt that they needed to become an independent church for their dreams to be realized. In many ways, this left the Declaration portion of the Declaration and Address obsolete, but the Address still maintained its rhetorical strength. Thus ended the short life of the Christian Association of Washington.

== Content ==
The Declaration and Address of the Christian Association of Washington is divided into the Declaration, the Address, and the Appendix. The document is written in the style of early 19th century American religious literature, making it difficult for many to read. Paragraphs sometimes stretch on for pages at a time, while the text is unfortunately void of any subheadings. This makes Knofel Staton's 1976 paraphrase of this document particularly helpful.

=== Declaration ===
The Declaration was intended to describe the form and function of the Christian Association. It begins with a brief statement revealing their personal religious conviction. "It is high time for us not only to think, but also to act... to take our measures directly and immediately from the Divine Standard [i.e. scripture]; to this alone we feel ourselves to be divinely bound." It is clear that Thomas Campbell, as well as the founders of the Christian Association, believed that scripture revealed one divinely inspired truth from which the early church could be recreated. They felt "divinely bound" to see that truth was given to the masses. This was the reason they founded the Christian Association of Washington. In the Declaration, Campbell described the function of the Christian Association in 9 points, outlined below in both Campbell's original text (modified for readability) and Staton's paraphrase.

Thomas Campbell's Declaration and Address	Knofel Staton's paraphrase
I. That we form ourselves into a religious association under the denomination of the Christian Association of Washington—for the sole purpose of promoting simple evangelical Christianity, free from all mixture of human opinions and inventions of men.	1. That we form a religious association free from all opinions to be called "The Christian Association of Washington".
II. That each member... subscribe a certain specified sum, to be paid half yearly, for the purpose of raising a fund to support a pure Gospel Ministry, that shall reduce to practice that whole form of doctrine, worship, discipline, and government, expressly revealed and enjoined in the word of God. And also for supplying the poor with the Holy Scriptures.	2. That each member designate whatever sum of money he can for (1) supporting a preaching ministry that will put into practice whatever the Bible says about doctrine, worship, discipline, and government (2) giving Bibles to the poor.
III. That this society consider it a duty, and shall use all proper means in its power, to encourage the formation of similar associations; ... to correspond with, and render all possible assistance to, such as may desire to associate for the same desirable and important purposes.	3. (Not included in Staton's paraphrase)
IV. That this society by no means considers itself a church... nor do the members, as such, consider themselves as standing connected in that relation... but merely as voluntary advocates for church reformation; and, as possessing the powers common to all individuals, who may please to associate in a peaceable and orderly manner...	4. That we do not consider ourselves a church, but merely as an association concerned with church reformation.
V. That this society, formed for the sole purpose of promoting simple evangelical Christianity, shall... countenance and support such ministers, and such only, as exhibit a manifest conformity to the original standard in conversation and doctrine... only such as reduce to practice that simple original form of Christianity, expressly exhibited upon the sacred page; without attempting to inculcate any thing of human authority, of private opinion, or inventions of men, as having any place in the constitution, faith, or worship, of the Christian church—or, any thing, as matter of Christian faith, or duty, for which there cannot be expressly produced a thus saith the Lord either in express terms, or by approved precedent.	5. That we exist for just one purpose—to promote simple evangelical Christianity. Let us support those ministers who will preach and practice pure New Testament Christianity without imposing anything for which there is not a clear "Thus saith the Lord."
VI. That a standing committee of twenty-one members of unexceptionable moral character, inclusive of the secretary and treasurer, be chosen annually to superintend the interests, and transact the business, of the society...	6. That we select a committee of 21 members to manage the business.
VII. That this society meet at least twice a year, viz. On the first Thursday of May, and of November, and that the collectors appointed to receive the half yearly quotas of the promised subscriptions, be in readiness... to make their returns to the treasurer, that he may be able to report upon the state of the funds...	7. That we meet at least twice a year.
VIII. That each meeting of the society be opened with a sermon, the constitution and address read, and a collection lifted for the benefit of the society—and that all communications of a public nature be laid before the society at its half yearly meetings.	8. That each meeting be public and opened with a sermon, the reading of our constitution and address, and an offering.
IX. That this Society, relying upon the all-sufficiency of the Church's Head; and, through his grace, looking with an eye of confidence to the generous liberality of the sincere friends of genuine Christianity; holds itself engaged to afford a competent support to such ministers as the Lord may graciously dispose to assist... in promoting a pure evangelical reformation, by the simple preaching of the everlasting Gospel, and the administration of its ordinances in an exact conformity to the Divine standard as aforesaid...	9. That we rely upon Jesus as the Church's head and depend upon Christian friends to donate monies to support preachers who will preach the eternal Gospel and administer the ordinances in exact conformity with the Bible.

=== Address ===
The Address is the bulk of Campbell's argumentation, culminating in 13 propositions approximately two-thirds of the way through it. It is here that Thomas Campbell writes his argument calling for the unification of the catholic (universal) church. The Address begins with the following:

"To all that love our Lord Jesus Christ, in sincerity, throughout all the Churches, the following Address is most respectfully submitted.
Dearly Beloved Brethren,
That it is the grand design and native tendency of our holy religion to reconcile and unite men to God, and to each other, in truth and love, to the glory of God, and their own present and eternal good, will not, we presume, be denied, by and of the subjects of Christianity."

Campbell then spends considerable time describing the current crisis facing the church. Continuing with this theme of uniting "men to God, and to each other, in truth and love", he argues that a divided church is hardly a proclamation of the gospel. "Campbell discourses on ecclesial schism as outright sin, and presupposes that the urgent summons to Christian unity is not his own but belongs to the whole church."

He continues, "Are not such the visible effects of our sad divisions, even in this otherwise happy country. Say, dear brethren, are not these things so? Is it not then your incumbent duty to endeavor, by all Scriptural means, to have those evils remedied. Who will say that it is not?" This task of uniting the church falls not on the shoulders of the Christian Association of Washington, but on the church at large. If this is done, then the church will certainly begin a new era. In many ways, the Declaration and Address has Zionist expectations of biblical proportions. Campbell believed that God ordained America as a new promised land, in which God's kingdom be renewed, for "then should our eyes soon behold the prosperity of Zion; we should soon see Jerusalem a quiet habitation." If the Churches unite as one, then they will be able to take the gospel to the vast expanses of the unreached west.

Campbell continues using such "Promised Land" terminology, specifically terminology reminiscent of the conquest. "'Union in Truth' is our motto. The Divine word is our standard; in the Lord's name do we display our banners." In a metaphorical way, the Western frontier of the 19th century was a new Promised Land where they would take the banners of union in truth to victory. Historically, these grand expectations for the church matched similar expectations for the greater political realm in the United States of America in the early 19th century.

Campbell presents 13 propositions for the reformation which he expected would follow suit. These clearly display his heart for Christian unity. They are outlined below in both the original Declaration and Address (modified for readability) and Stanton's paraphrase. Both are summarized because of length.

Thomas Campbell's Declaration and Address	Knofel Staton's paraphrase
1. That the Church of Christ upon earth is essentially, intentionally, and constitutionally one; consisting of all those in every place that profess their faith in Christ and obedience to him in all things according to the Scriptures...	1. The Church of Christ on earth is indispensably, intentionally, and structurally one. It includes everyone in any place who professes trust and obedience to Christ in all matters according to the Scriptures; and who demonstrates such in character and conduct...
2. That although the Church of Christ upon earth must necessarily exist in particular and distinct societies, locally separate one from another, yet there ought to be no schisms, no uncharitable divisions among them... And for this purpose they ought all to walk by the same rule... and to be perfectly joined in the same mind...	2. Although the Church of Christ on earth exists in different locations, there should be no divisions among congregations. Each congregation should receive the other as Christ Jesus has... To facilitate this, all congregations should observe the same practices and speak the same principles.
3. That in order to do this, nothing ought to be inculcated upon Christians as articles of faith; nor required of them as terms of communion, but what is expressly taught and enjoined upon them in the word of God. Nor ought anything to be admitted, as of Divine obligation... but what is expressly enjoined by the authority of our Lord Jesus Christ and his apostles upon the New Testament Church; either in express terms or by approved precedent.	3. In order to carry this out, nothing should be forced upon Christians except what is clearly taught in the Word of God... Thus human traditions, regardless of "how long we've done it that way," cannot be our authority.
4. That although the Scriptures of the Old and New Testaments are inseparably connected... one perfect and entire revelation of the Divine will... [and] therefore in that respect can not be separated..., the New Testament is as perfect a constitution for the worship, discipline, and government of the New Testament Church, and as perfect a rule for the particular duties of its members, as the Old Testament was for ... the Old Testament Church....	4. Although God's revealed will is expressed in both the Old and New Testament books, the New Testament books contain the immediate constitution for the worship, discipline, and government of the corporate Church and for the duties of the individual members.
5. That with respect to the commands and ordinances of our Lord Jesus Christ... no human authority has power to interfere... by making laws for the Church; nor can anything more be required of Christians in such cases, but only that they observe these commands and ordinances... Much less has any human authority power to impose new commands or ordinances upon the Church, which our Lord Jesus Christ has not enjoined. Nothing ought to be received into the faith or worship of the Church, or be made a term of communion among Christians, that is not as old as the New Testament.	5. Nothing ought to be received into the beliefs and worship of the Church nor made the test for fellowship which is not as old as the New Testament books. No one should dictate binding directives outlining exactly how procedures have to be carried out if the New Testament is silent about such procedures....
6. That although inferences and deductions from Scripture premises, when fairly inferred, may be truly called the doctrine of God's holy word, yet are they not formally binding upon the consciences of Christians farther than they perceive the connection.... Therefore, no such deductions can be made terms of communion... Hence, it is evident that no such deductions or inferential truths ought to have any place in the Church's confession.	6. The "conclusions" we arrive at from systematic Scriptural study, as doctrinally valid and valuable as they may be, should not be used as tests of fellowship... a man's faith must stand upon the power and truth of God, not in the wisdom of men. Our "conclusions" should be used for building up those who are already Christians, not for admittance exams to those who are not.
7. That although doctrinal exhibitions of the great system of Divine truths... be highly expedient, and the more full and explicit they be for those purposes, the better; yet, as these must be in a great measure the effect of human reasoning... they ought not to be made terms of Christian communion; unless we suppose, what is contrary to fact, that none have a right to the communion of the Church, but such as possess a very clear and decisive judgment... whereas the Church from the beginning did, and ever will, consist of little children and young men, as well as fathers.	7. Our "conclusions" will certainly vary as we systematically study the many various topics within Christianity. The more comprehensibly we study and communicate a topic, the better. However, let us realize that the Church is made up of all levels of spiritual maturity... That means we will always have differences in our understandings and thus in our conclusions. But these differences should not be used as tests of fellowship.
8. That as it is not necessary that persons should have a particular knowledge or distinct apprehension of all Divinely revealed truths in order to entitle them to a place in the Church; neither should they, for this purpose, be required to make a profession more extensive than their knowledge; but... having a due measure of Scriptural self-knowledge respecting their lost and perishing condition... and of the way of salvation through Jesus Christ... is all that is absolutely necessary to qualify them for admission into his Church.	8. It is not necessary that people see all God's truth exactly alike before they are added to His Church. What is necessary is that they recognize two things: (1) their lost condition and (2) Jesus' way of salvation. And then declare their faith in Him and their willingness to obey Him in all things.
9. That all that are enabled through grace to make such a profession, and to manifest the reality of it in their tempers and conduct, should consider each other as the precious saints of God, should love each other as brethren, etc.... Whom God hath thus joined no man should dare to put asunder.	9. Anyone who has made such a declaration should consider anyone else who has made such an acknowledgment as saints of God and should love such as brothers, etc... And whom God hath joined no man should dare to put aside.
10. That division among the Christians is a horrid evil, fraught with many evils. It is antichristian, as it destroys the visible unity of the body of Christ; as if he were divided against himself, excluding and excommunicating a part of himself. It is antiscriptural, as being strictly prohibited by his sovereign authority; a direct violation of his express command. It is antinatural, as it excites Christians to contemn, to hate, and oppose one another, who are bound by the highest and most endearing obligations to love each other as brethren, even as Christ has loved them....	10. Division among Christians is a repulsive evil filled with many tragedies. Here are three of those tragedies: (1) It is antichristian... (2) It is antiscriptural... (3) It is antinatural....
11. That (in some instances) a partial neglect of the expressly revealed will of God, and (in others) an assumed authority for making the approbation of human opinions and human inventions a term of communion... are, and have been, the immediate, obvious, and universally acknowledged causes of all the corruptions and divisions that ever have taken place in the Church of God....	11. All the past and present corruptions and divisions in the Church have resulted from two causes: (1) The partial neglect of the clearly expressed will of God; (2) The insistence that human opinions and hobby horses be accepted in the belief, life, and worship of the Church.
12. That all that is necessary to the highest state of perfection and purity of the Church upon earth is, first, that none be received as members but such as having that due measure of Scriptural self-knowledge described above... nor, secondly, that any be retained in her communion longer than they continue to manifest the reality of their profession by their temper and conduct. Thirdly, that her ministers, duly and Scripturally qualified, inculcate none other things than those very articles of faith and holiness expressly revealed and enjoined in the word of God. Lastly, that in all their administrations they keep close by the observance of all Divine ordinances, after the example of the primitive Church, exhibited in the New Testament; without any additions whatsoever of human opinions or inventions of men.	12. There are four practices necessary if the Church is to manifest the maturity and manners God wants: (1) That no one be admitted who does not acknowledge faith in Christ and obedience to Him. (2) That no one be kept who doesn't back up that acknowledgment with character and conduct. (3) That properly qualified preachers teach nothing other than what is clearly expressed in the Word of God. (4) That those preachers observe all the Divine ordinances which the Church in the New Testament books observed—in the way that the Church observed them.
13. Lastly. That if any circumstantials indispensably necessary to the observance of Divine ordinances be not found upon the page of express revelation, such, and such only, as are absolutely necessary for this purpose should be adopted under the title of human expedients, without any pretense to a more sacred origin, so that any subsequent alteration or difference in the observance of these things might produce no contention nor division in the Church.	13. When the observances of the ordinances are altered due to circumstances and the alteration is essential or the observance would not have been possible (due to the circumstances) then that alteration must be seen as a human expedient only. No higher sanction can be given to it.

The homepage for the Christian Churches/Churches of Christ summarized these 13 propositions into the following 5 principles:

1. That the church of Christ upon earth is essentially, intentionally, and constitutionally one; consisting of all those in every place that profess their faith in Christ and obedience to him in all things according to the Scriptures. . . .
2. That . . . there ought to be no schisms, no uncharitable divisions among [local congregations].
3. That . . . nothing ought to be inculcated upon Christians as articles of faith; nor required of them as terms of communion; but what is expressly taught and enjoined upon them, in the Word of God.
4. That . . . the New Testament is as perfect a constitution for the worship, discipline, and government of the New Testament church, and as perfect a rule of the particular duties of its members, as the Old Testament was for the worship, discipline, and government of the Old Testament church. . . .
5. That . . . [no] human authority [has] power to impose new commands or ordinances upon the church, which our Lord Jesus Christ has not enjoined.

=== Appendix ===
The Appendix comprises approximately half of the Declaration and Address. Here, Campbell confronts possible points of contention. While presenting nothing new, he expands on previous arguments hoping to clear up possible misunderstandings. For example, Campbell and his associates may have been viewed as anti-creedal, but they did not reject all use of creeds. They merely viewed creeds as instruments of study rather than lenses of interpretation.

As to creeds and confessions, although we may appear to our brethren to oppose them, yet this is to be understood only in so far as they oppose the unity of the Church, by containing sentiments not expressly revealed in the word of God; or, by the way of using them, become the instruments of a human or implicit faith, or oppress the weak of God's heritage. Where they are liable to none of those objections, we have nothing against them. It is the abuse and not the lawful use of such compilations that we oppose.

Another point of interest in the Appendix is Campbell's discussion of the reason for varying interpretations of scripture. It is his understanding that scripture reveals a single distinct and clear truth. Despite this single distinct and clear truth, generations of Christians have often disagreed with how to apply different portions of scripture. Rather than acknowledging that scripture is sometimes ambiguous and difficult to understand, he framed his response in the language of Romans 14, the weak and the strong believer. It is his belief that further exposure to scripture, as well as greater discussion with the saints, will reveal God's clear truth. This truth, as revealed in scripture, is the sole basis for restoring the true church. In short, if unity if to happen, it must be done around the scriptures.

It was not Campbell's intention to create more schisms and divisions in the church, only to offer them a way in which the church might unite. Thomas Campbell ends the Appendix with this statement revealing his character and humility:

"Thus, upon the whole, have we briefly attempted to point out those evils, and to prevent those mistakes which we earnestly desire to see obviated for the general peace, welfare, and prosperity of the Church of God. Our dear brethren, giving credit to our sincere and well-meant intention, will charitably excuse the imperfections of our humble performance, and by the assistance of their better judgment correct those mistakes, and supply those deficiencies which in a first attempt of this nature may have escaped our notice"

== Analysis ==
=== Argumentation and use of scripture ===
Thomas Campbell was highly educated for a preacher of the 18th century. He studied at Glasgow university under George Jardine, who was a friend and student of Thomas Reid. As such, Thomas Campbell employed a highly developed rhetoric in the Declaration and Address clearly influenced by Common Sense Hermeneutics (as discussed below).

His use of scripture falls into 3 categories:

1. References to scripture using citations (Ezek. 44:6-9), but without actually quoting the verse.
2. Quotations taken from scripture, with or without a citation.
3. Allusion to scripture without using a citation or quotation.

The allusions to scripture are woven throughout the entire Declaration and Address. It is clear that he assumed the readers to be well acquainted with the Bible. He refers to a wide array of books from both the Old Testament and New Testament (21 from the OT and 25 from the NT). His favorite Old Testament references are the Prophets and the Psalms. His favorite New Testament section, as noted above, comes from Romans 14–15. He frequently alludes to the strong and the weak and opens the Declaration with an allusion to the individual judgment inherent in humanity (Rom. 14:3,10). In addition to Romans, Campbell frequents references to Zion. Zion, the mountain of the Lord, shall be rebuilt here in America. Now is the set time, a new time ordained by God. Campbell uses a rhetoric that states this as fact, and then employs a technique that encourages the ministers to take part in what God has already ordained.

Surely, then, the time to favor her is come; even the set time. And is it not said that Zion shall be built in troublous times? Have not greater efforts been made, and more done, for the promulgation of the Gospel among the nations, since the commencement of the French Revolution, than had been for many centuries prior to that event? And have not the Churches, both in Europe and America, since that period, discovered a more than usual concern for the removal of contentions, for the healing of divisions...? Should we not, then, be excited by these considerations to concur with all our might, to help forward this good work;

=== Common sense hermeneutics ===
Thomas Campbell was heavily influenced by the teachings of John Locke (specifically Locke's Essay Concerning Human Understanding) and common sense philosophy. In the 18th and 19th centuries, common sense philosophy was a powerful rhetoric. Its philosophy is based on the collective sense ("common sense") of humanity. That which is universally agreed to be right and true is, in fact, right and true. In the 18th century, common sense philosophy was applied to the principle of hermeneutics, or the interpretation of texts. This "common sense hermeneutic", one that allowed for individuals to approach and understand scripture directly, meshed well with the ideals of the American frontier. It was also combined with the rationalism of the Enlightenment, namely that reason was the epitome of the philosophical endeavor and that scholars can systematically figure out the mysteries of the world. This blending of the common sense hermeneutic and the rationalism of the Enlightenment created a distinctive understanding of scripture that may be outlined in the following principles:

- God is revealed in God's Holy Word, namely scripture, and that He reveals in it one single truth.
- God is also revealed in the collective intellect of humanity, so that when the people of God endeavor to study the scriptures together, God's one truth will be understood clearly and plainly.

This very systematic approach to the study of scripture became foundational for the Restoration Movement. Each person is entitled to examine the scriptures for him/herself. This allows for varied interpretations, while simultaneously giving the power of interpretation back to the local congregation.

=== Criticisms ===
The primary criticism of the Declaration and Address concerns the conflict between unity and restoration. These two principles, which run throughout the document, "have been seen as in tension with each other, if not contradictory, and consequently the source of faction within the movement."

== Historic designation ==
In 1994, the Pennsylvania Historical and Museum Commission installed a historical marker noting the historic importance of the publishing of the document.

== See also ==
- Christian Church (Disciples of Christ)
