= Sarah Bostick =

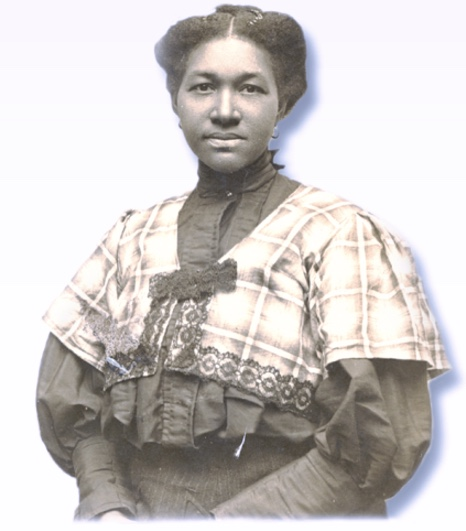
Sarah Bostick

Sarah Lue Bostick (1868–1948) born Sarah Lue Howard near Glasgow, Kentucky, on May 27, 1868, was key in organizing the first African-American Christian Woman's Board of Missions auxiliary in 1892 and subsequent clubs throughout the south at the turn of the 20th century.

In 1892, she was the first African American woman ordained in the Disciples.

== Works ==
- Bostick, Sarah Lou; Bertha Caroline Fuller; T R Moore; Claude E Spencer (1949). The Life Story of Sarah Lou Bostick: A Woman of the Negro Race. Little Rock, Arkansas.

== See also ==
- Sadie McCoy Crank
- Jessie Trout
