= Jessie Trout =

Canadian missionary to Japan

Jessie M. Trout
- Born: July 26, 1895; Owen Sound, Ontario, Canada
- Died: 1990 (aged 94–95)
- Occupations: Missionary to Japan & church leader
- Years active: 1921–1961
- Employer: Christian Church (Disciples of Christ)

Jessie M. Trout (July 26, 1895 – 1990) was a Canadian missionary to Japan for nearly 20 years until she left Japan during World War II. She was a leader in the Christian Church (Disciples of Christ), including being the first woman vice president of the denomination's United Christian Missionary Society. She co-founded the Christian Women's Fellowship (1950) and the International Christian Women's Fellowship (1953), both Disciples groups for women. She also was a writer and translator.

She received an honorary doctorate from Bethany College in 1955.

== Early life ==
Jessie Mary Trout was born to Archibald Trout on July 26, 1895 at Owen Sound off of Georgian Bay in Ontario, Canada. She graduated from Owen Sound Collegiate Institute and studied at the teachers college, Toronto Normal School. She was a school teacher, when she traveled to Indianapolis in 1920. She also studied at The College of Missions in Indianapolis, which trained missionaries for the Disciples. The school was founded by the Christian Woman's Board of Missions.

== Career ==
=== Japan ===
Inspired by a church member, Trout was a missionary in Japan for the Disciples from 1921 to 1940, spending the first two years learning Japanese. Then she served women and girls in Akita. She taught at the Margaret K. Long for Girls (Japanese: Joshi Se Gakun, meaning Girl’s Holy School) in Tokyo beginning in 1931. She worked from 1935 to 1940 in an ecumenical program in Kagawa, under Toyohiko Kagawa. She entertained notable people and translated his works. She took a leave in 1940 and due to increased nationalism was unable to return to Japan, losing her belongings, including an extensive print collection.

While in Japan, she met and mentored Itoko Maeda, a young girl attending the Christian school. Trout aided Maeda in getting scholarships to continue her Christian education, both in Japan and the United States. Itoko Maeda would later go on to become an important missionary in her own right.

=== Japanese-American internment camps ===
During World War II, Trout left Japan and returned to the United States. She was one of the church leaders who visited Japanese Internment camps during World War II to conduct "mass meetings, seminars, open forums, ministers' conferences, [and] Bible study sessions," serving the Emergency Million Movement as Associate Director. The Disciples of Christ was outspoken in its opposition to the internment of Japanese Americans and as Conner writes, "[It] took a leading role in a well-coordinated, national public and private effort to move Japanese Americans out of internment camps and resettle them in towns and cities across the nation’s heartland." Trout, as a Disciples missionary, aided in this effort by touring rural Indiana communities to determine the availability of employment for, and sentiments towards, the internees.

=== Leadership ===
In the 1940s, she was the national secretary of World Call, the magazine of the United Christian Missionary Society. In January 1946, she became the executive secretary of the department of missionary education; in that role she oversaw a large field staff and worked with 5,000 organizations throughout the United States. From 1950 to 1961, she was vice president of the United Christian Missionary Society in Indianapolis; The first woman to assume that position. Trout worked for the Division of World Missions as a field liaison. Over her career, she traveled to 35 countries, some of which were during revolutionary control. She was a leader in the Disciples of Christ (Campbell Movement) of Thomas and Alexander Campbell.

Trout helped co-found the Christian Women's Fellowship in 1950 and was chief executive of the Christian Women's Fellowship. Throughout United States and Canada, there were about 250,000 members in more than 4,200 groups. This was a significant effort to organize efforts of women and make their efforts more meaningful during a conservative period when women's leadership roles within the Christian Church was limited. It merged local women's guilds and missionary organizations. She founded the International Christian Women's Fellowship (1953). Trout also helped establish women's groups in Britain and visited women's groups in Thailand, Germany, Japan, the Philippines, Britain, and Pakistan.

== Later years ==
She returned to missionary work in Japan 1961 and retired in 1963, intending to continue her efforts as a translator and a speaker and living in Indianapolis in the winter and Owen Sound in the summer.

== Works ==
- Kagawa, Toyohiko (author); Jessie M. Trout (translator); Kiyozumi Ozawa (translator). (circa 1936) Christian Brotherhood and Economic Reconstruction. London: Student Christian Movement Press.
- Kagawa, Toyohiko; Maxine Shore; Jessie Trout; M. M. Oblinger (1941). The Two Kingdoms. Lutterworth Press.
- Trout, Jessie M. (1942). Forward in Missions and Education: Disciples of Christ help build the Kingdom; a study course for adults and young people. United Christian Missionary Society.
- Trout, Jessie M. (1953). Where We Have Served. Indianapolis: United Christian Missionary Society.
- Trout, Jessie. (1954). Like a Watered Garden. Bethany Press.
- Kagawa, Toyohiko; Wright, Rose; Trout, Jessie (translator). (1956). Pine, bamboo, and plum.
- Trout, Jessie. (1957). Bertha Fidelia Her Story. Bethany Press.
- Kagawa, Toyohiko; Trout, Jessie M. (1960). Kagawa, Japanese prophet: His witness in life and word. New York: Association Press. WorldCat Link
