= Archibald Campbell (abolitionist) =

American lawyer, abolitionist and journalist (1833–1899)

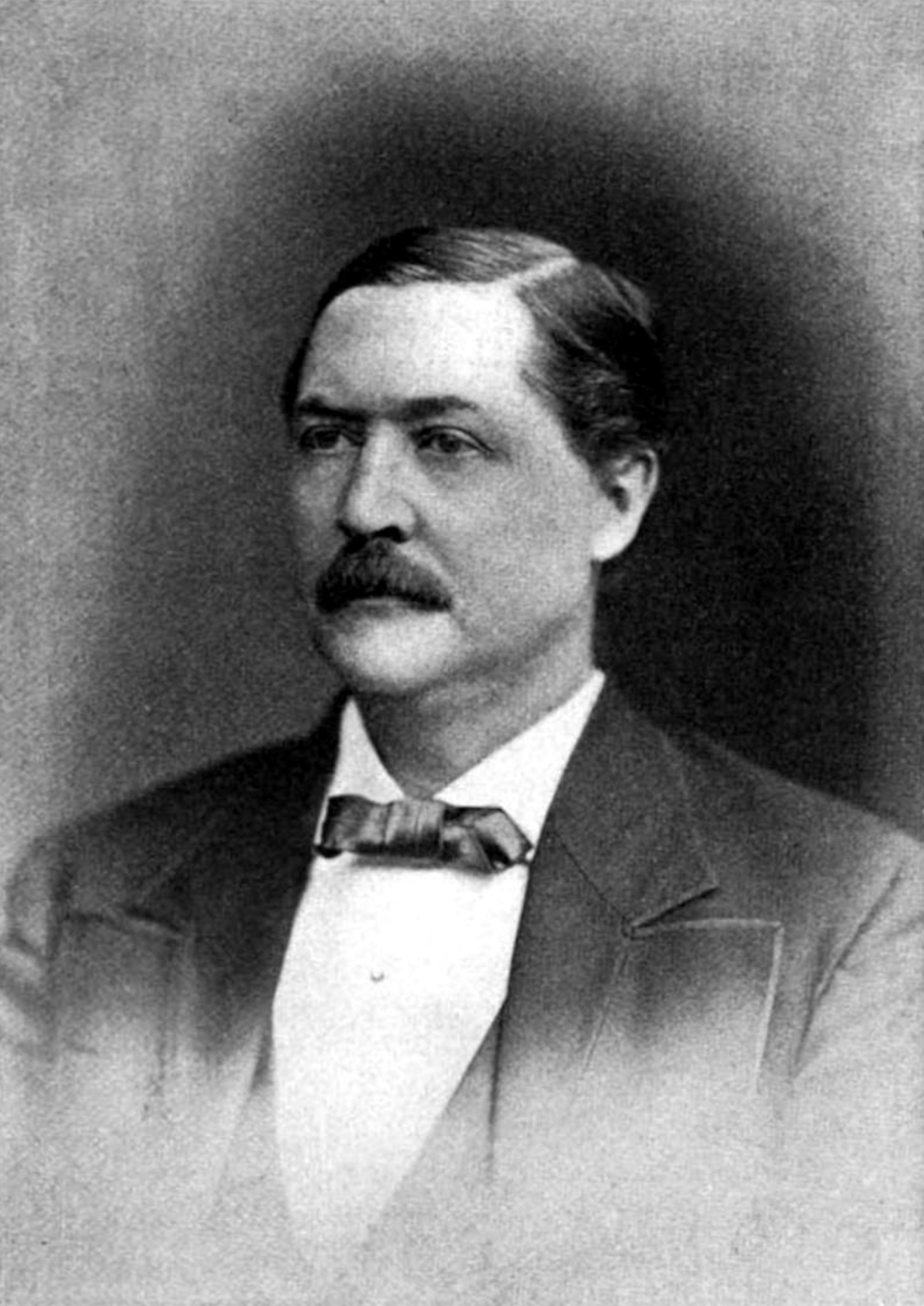
- Campbell in 1902
- Born: Archibald W. Campbell; April 4, 1833; Jefferson County, Ohio, U.S.
- Died: February 13, 1899 (aged 65); Webster Groves, Missouri, U.S.
- Resting place: Greenwood Cemetery, Wheeling, West Virginia, U.S. 40.06192°N 80.67931°W
- Other name: Archie Campbell
- Occupations: Lawyer; publisher; abolitionist
- Known for: Promoting the creation of West Virginia as a slave-free state
- Spouses: Annie W. Crawford (m. 1864, died): Mary H.
- Relatives: Alexander Campbell, Uncle; Thomas Alexander, Grandfather

Archibald W. Campbell (/kæmˈbʊl/; April 4, 1833 – February 13, 1899) was a lawyer, abolitionist, journalist, and member of the nascent Republican Party. He was born in Ohio in 1833 and raised in the western portion of Virginia. He met future Secretary of State, William H. Seward while studying law in New York. Influenced by Seward, Campbell joined the Republican Party. He bought the Wheeling Daily Intelligencer in 1856 and endeavored to expand its influence in Virginia. Campbell used the influence of his newspaper to advocate for the creation of West Virginia against the backdrop of the Civil War.

== Early life ==
Born on April 4, 1833, in Jefferson County, Ohio, Campbell's parents were Archibald W. Campbell and Phebe Clapp. His father's older brother was the influential Christian reformer, Alexander Campbell. Young Archibald grew up in the vicinity of Bethany, Virginia where his family had moved and where his uncle had started Bethany College, while his father served the community as a physician. Graduating from Bethany College in 1852, he subsequently studied law in New York at Hamilton College, receiving his law degree in 1855. There he met William H. Seward, and under his influence joined the newly formed Republican Party and took up the abolitionist cause.

== Public life ==
Partnering with John F. McDermot to buy the Wheeling Daily Intelligencer in 1856, Campbell assumed the role of the paper's editor in October of that year. He leveraged the paper's growing circulation over the next couple years to espouse his views against slavery.

In 1859, Campbell lobbied Republican Party leaders to hold its 1860 national convention in Wheeling, but was unsuccessful. At the convention which was held in Chicago, Campbell initially backed his mentor Seward in the latter's pursuit of the party's presidential nomination. With insufficient support for Seward within the party, Campbell subsequently endorsed the nomination of Abraham Lincoln.

Campbell viewed the policies of Virginia's state government as harmful to the residents of northwestern Virginia. When the Ordinance of Secession was adopted at the Convention of 1861, Campbell again turned to the power of the press by using his newspaper's popularity to promote the perceived benefits western Virginians might enjoy by establishing a new state. President Lincoln purportedly told West Virginia's Governor Pierpont that a timely letter written by Archibald Campbell had persuaded him to sign the bill that admitted West Virginia to the Union as a new state over his cabinet's opposition. Campbell also used his influence to champion the abolition of slavery as a provision in the first constitution of West Virginia.

During and after the Civil War, Campbell viewed himself as a staunch Republican. But that allegiance was tested when he felt Party interests did not align with what he felt was best for West Virginia. By 1880, his vocal disagreements with party leaders on several issues had nearly resulted in his expulsion from the national convention. Despite the threat, he was able to lend his support to his friend, James A. Garfield's presidential nomination. After his election, President Garfield selected Campbell to serve as ambassador to China, but was killed before the supporting paperwork was finalized. Campbell, himself, appears to have been content to avoid seeking public office or government appointment.

== Personal life ==
Campbell married Annie W. Crawford in Wheeling, West Virginia, on March 10, 1864. Annie subsequently gave birth to a son and later, a daughter. After Annie later died, Campbell took a second wife named Mary H., whose surname is unknown. One daughter is known to have been born to the couple.

== Death and legacy ==
Campbell gradually withdrew from his day-to-day editing and publishing responsibilities at the Intelligencer to allocate more time to other business pursuits and personal interests. He suffered a stroke and died on February 13, 1899, while visiting his sister in Missouri. He is interred at Greenwood Cemetery in Wheeling.

Campbell was inducted into the Wheeling Hall of Fame in 1980.
