= Redstone Baptist Association =

The Redstone Baptist Association was an association of Baptist churches in Western Pennsylvania. The early Restoration Movement leader Alexander Campbell and the congregation he led, the Brush Run Church, were members of the Association for several years during the early 19th century.

== Relations with the Disciples of Christ (Campbell Movement) ==
When their study of the New Testament led the Campbells and their associates to begin practicing baptism by immersion, the nearby Redstone Baptist Association invited Brush Run Church to join with them for the purpose of fellowship. They agreed, provided that they would be "allowed to preach and to teach whatever they learned from the Scriptures." This position was made explicit in their official application for membership, which was submitted in 1815 and insisted on the right to teach whatever they found in the Bible without being limited by the Philadelphia Confession of Faith. Thomas and Alexander worked within the Redstone Baptist Association during the period 1815 through 1824. Alexander was active in the business of the Association, serving 1817 and 1818 as clerk of the meeting and in various other committee roles.

While both the Campbells and the Baptists shared practices of baptism by immersion and congregational polity, it was soon clear that the Campbells and their associates were not traditional Baptists. Within the Redstone Association, some of the Baptist leaders considered the differences intolerable when Alexander Campbell began publishing a journal, The Christian Baptist, which promoted Restoration Movement ideas. The Campbells anticipated the conflict and moved their membership to a congregation of the Mahoning Baptist Association in 1824. Factors contributing to the separation included the "Sermon on the Law" that Alexander preached in the 1816 annual meeting of the Association, an 1820 debate in which he argued the Old Testament should not be used as a basis for determining how Christians should live, his emphasis on baptism for the remission of sins, and the positions he took in the Christian Baptist. The Redstone Association responded by withdrawing fellowship from the Brush Run church in 1824 and expelling four other congregations associated with the Campbells in 1826.
