= Sadie McCoy Crank =

American temperance activist (1863–1948)

Sadie McCoy Crank, born Sarah Catherine McCoy, (August 15, 1863 – September 20, 1948) was one of the earliest ordained (1892) female preachers in the Stone-Campbell Movement and an organizer for the Illinois Woman's Christian Temperance Union. This is notable because around this time a vigorous debate about the role of women as preachers was taking place in religious periodicals like the Gospel Advocate, Christian Standard, and Christian-Evangelist.

== Early life ==
Sarah Catherine McCoy, nicknamed Sadie, was born on August 15, 1863, near Breckenridge, Illinois. Her mother had twelve children from two husbands. Her second husband, Sadie's father, was an alcoholic who failed to support the family and was abusive. Despite her father's efforts to make her stay, she went to work for the county school superintendent when she was 16 years of age. In exchange, she was given room and board and was able to continue attending school. The small salary that she earned provided support for her mother and the children who were at home. She then became a schoolteacher.

Although exposes to the Primitive Baptist religion of her parents, Crank found an affinity with the preachings of Elder Wilson, a Christian Church minister and was baptized in May 1887 at Bear Creek in Illinois.

== Preacher ==
She was hired by Sunday school evangelist for the Illinois State Sunday School Society by James Rawser Crank. While holding an institute at Marcelline, Illinois, 96 attendees decided that they wished to be baptized into the faith. Sadie, at first reluctantly, continued to preach after this impressive response. As Sechler writes, "At the Marceline Institute she was asked to go on with a meeting since so many young people were interested. She told them she could not as her sermons were used and she had no more ready. The old Elder there told her that people were interested who had never been interested before, and that if she left their blood would be on her soul. She thought it over and stayed. That was the first regular meeting." So that she could baptize people, she was ordained on March 17, 1892, in Marceline by J.S. Clemments (a general evangelist for the American Missionary Society). One year later, she was married to James Rawser Crank, with whom she later had four children.

The Cranks received pressure for Sadie to retire from preaching after marriage. There were also offers for her to serve churches in the cities. She remained a preacher in rural Illinois and served on the Christian Woman's Board of Missions. Together with her husband, an evangelist, Crank helped organize and build numerous churches throughout Illinois and Missouri. During her lifetime, she baptized thousands of people and officiated many weddings and funerals.

== See also ==
- Sarah Bostick
