= Christian Association of Washington =

Christian organization in Pennsylvania, United States

The Christian Association of Washington was an organization established by Thomas Campbell in 1809 to promote Christian unity. It was a study group that Campbell formed with like minded friends and acquaintances in the local neighborhood of Washington, Pennsylvania. The group sought to foster unity by focusing on a common form of Christianity that they could all agree upon. This charter that Campbell wrote for this group, the Declaration and Address of the Christian Association of Washington, became one of the most important early texts of the Restoration Movement.

== History ==
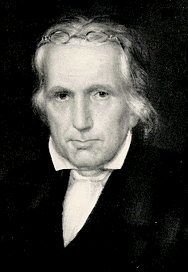
Thomas Campbell

After arriving in the United States in 1807, Thomas Campbell began working with the Associate Synod of North America, which assigned him to the Chartiers Presbytery in Western Pennsylvania. He was censured by the Presbytery for extending communion to individuals who were not seceder Presbyterians, and withdrew from the synod. After withdrawing, he continued to preach, working with Christians without regard to their denominational affiliation.

In 1809 Campbell decided to establish a Christian society which individuals could join, but that would not be a church. During a first meeting in the summer of 1809, Campbell discussed his concern about the divisions among Christians, and proposed that unity could be restored by taking the Bible as the only standard for faith and practice. The group adopted the "rule" he proposed, "Where the Scriptures speak, we speak; and where they are silent, we are silent," as its only creed.

During a second meeting, held on August 17, 1809, the name "Christian Association of Washington" was chosen and Campbell was asked to draft a statement of the purposes and objectives of the Association. The Declaration and Address of the Christian Association of Washington was adopted unanimously on September 7, 1809 and published shortly before the end of the year. The Declaration received little attention at the time.

Campbell soon became concerned that, despite his intentions, the Association was taking on the characteristics of a church. After the Association unsuccessfully sought to be accepted into fellowship with the Pittsburgh Synod of the Presbyterian Church in the United States of America, Campbell became convinced that it would have to become an independent church in order to continue to function. On May 4, 1811, the Association reconstituted itself as a congregationally governed church. With the building it constructed at Brush Run, Pennsylvania, it became known as the Brush Run Church.
