= Christian Woman's Board of Missions =

The Christian Woman's Board of Missions (CWBM) was a missionary organization associated with the Restoration Movement. Established in 1874, it was the first such group managed entirely by women. It hired both men and women, and supported both domestic and foreign missions.

== History ==
The Christian Woman's Board of Missions was created by the American Christian Missionary Society on October 21, 1874. It was a grassroots organization intended to serve women and children worldwide. While many members also supported other 19th century causes such as temperance and suffrage, "CWBM was the 'grand passion' in the lives of many nineteenth- and twentieth-century Christian Church women."

The CWBM's first mission was in Jamaica, where Dr. and Mrs. W.H. Williams were sent in 1876. The first missionary who was a single woman, Jennie Laughlin, was sent in 1876. India became the major focus of the CWBM's overseas efforts, which included evangelistic efforts focusing on women and children, as well as building a variety of social service facilities such as schools, hospitals and orphanages. The organization was particularly effective, both at home and abroad, in reaching women and children in settings where it would be difficult or impossible for men to go.

For an example of the work being done, see the full program of the Kentucky C.W.B.M. Convention, September 21–22, 1903, published in The Bourbon (Paris, Ky.) News.

The CWBM merged with several other organizations in 1919 to form the United Christian Missionary Society.

== Notable people ==
- Sarah Bostick (1868–1948), co-organized the first African-American Christian Woman's Board of Missions auxiliary in 1892
- Selina Huntington Bakewell Campbell (1802-1897), an important woman in the Restoration Movement
- Eunice Caldwell Cowles (1811-1903), educator
- Anne Alexander Dickey (1843–1940), clubwoman
- Clara H. Hazelrigg (1859–1937), author, educator, reformer
- Luella St. Clair Moss (1865-1947), educator, suffragist
- Caroline Neville Pearre (1834–1910), founder of the Christian Woman's Board of Missions
- Jessie Trout (1895–1990), missionary

== See also ==
- Women's missionary societies
