= Selina Huntington Bakewell Campbell =

Leader in the Stone-Campbell Movement (1802–1897)

- Born: Selina Huntington Bakewell; October 11, 1802; Lichfield, Staffordshire, England
- Died: June 28, 1897 (aged 94); Bethany, West Virginia, USA
- Notable work: Home Life and Reminiscences of Alexander Campbell

Selina Huntington Bakewell Campbell (11 October 1802 – 28 June 1897) was an important woman in the Restoration Movement, which is sometimes referred to as the Stone-Campbell Movement. She was the second wife of Alexander Campbell.

== Biography ==
The daughter of Samuel and Anna Maria (Bean) Bakewell, her birth was registered as having occurred in the Parish of St. Mary at Lichfield in Staffordshire County, England. Her birth record notes that her family were non-conformists, indicating they were not members of the Anglican Church, but were either Presbyterian, Independent, or Baptist.

Selina Bakewell was baptized at nineteen years of age by her mentor, Alexander Campbell, and had a close relationship with his wife, Margaret Brown Campbell. She became a member of the Wellsburg, West Virginia, Church of Christ and formed a very close relationship with the Campbell family. So close that, as Margaret lay dying of tuberculosis, Margaret secured a promise from her husband to consider the young miss Bakewell for the role of stepmother to their five daughters.

Campbell was instrumental in the planning of Bethany College with her husband.

In 1856, she became the first woman within the Disciples of Christ to call for funds to support foreign missions in her Millennial Harbinger article "To My Christian Sisters in Common Faith". The article was written in support of Mary Williams, the sole missionary of the Stone-Campbell movement at the time.

Campbell's efforts to promote the Gospel outside of preaching served as an example of how women could take on a more active role within the Disciples of Christ. Campbell "believed women's preaching was in no way supported by Scripture, but she found plenty of evidence for participation in other ways, such as teaching children, in the New Testament." Selina believed that scriptures in the Bible should be the final authority regarding the subject of female preachers. One of her foundational arguments rested on the fact that Jesus chose all men to be his twelve disciples. Another of her arguments related to Paul's words in 1 Corinthians 14:34, "women should remain silent in the church." Selina believed there was a lack of scriptural precedent to support female preachers. In addition, she questioned the motives of the women of her time, stating, "Many of my sex are seeking notoriety by coming forward without being called or sent to do the work."

Selina did not use her position "as a soapbox". Instead she "shared her views with other women, hoping they would find truth in her words."

She later served as president of the West Virginia chapter of the Christian Woman's Board of Missions.

In 1881, Campbell completed a book about her husband's life, Home Life and Reminiscences of Alexander Campbell, which provides domestic and biographical details of Alexander Campbell.
