= Evangelical Christian Church in Canada =

Logo of the Evangelical Christian Church in Canada

The Evangelical Christian Church (Christian Disciples) is an evangelical Protestant Canadian church body. The Evangelical Christian Church's national office in Canada is in Waterloo, Ontario.

== History ==
The church has its origins in the formal organization of the Christian Church (Disciples of Christ) in 1804, in Bourbon County, Kentucky under the leadership of Barton Warren Stone (1772–1844).

The Evangelical Christian Church, also known as "Christian Disciples" became the Stone-Campbell Movement, also called the Restoration Movement which arose on the frontiers of early 19th-century America. Like minded Methodists, Baptists, and Presbyterians abandoned denominational labels in order to be "Christians only" from the Stone group, and "Disciples" from the Campbell group. They called followers from both groups to join in Christian unity and restore the ideals of the primitive New Testament church, holding only the Bible as authoritative.

The Evangelical Christian Church (Christian Disciples), founded in 1804, joined with other Canadian branches in 1832, and the first work of the Christian Disciples of Evangelical Christian Church to form was in 1810 in Stratford, PEI, in the Maritime provinces Canada. The oldest Christian Disciples Church in Canada was founded in 1810 by John R. Stewart, an immigrant from Perthshire, Scotland. The first Meeting House (Cross Roads Christian Church) was a log cabin built in 1813. The church was designed by members of the congregation, which were then Christian Disciples whose faith was influenced by Baptist theology. From 1907 to 1947, the church was operated as a Baptist charge in conjunction with Scottish Baptists churches in Alexandra and Hazelbrook, when it apparently again became an Evangelical Christian Church. The following year, the church was visited by the noted evangelist, Alexander Crawford, who was then also working in Yarmouth, Nova Scotia. Crawford would remain with the Cross Roads congregation for almost two years before moving to Tryon, Prince Edward Island.

It was after the Second World War that a collaboration between an All-Canadian and North-American (Evangelical Christian Churches) Movement began as a way to coordinate and unite the various churches and ministries within Canada. As this movement developed, in Canada, following up to the early 1940s, .... the Great Western Revival caused a tidal wave of religious interest and excitement in the Canadian Evangelical Christian Church to sweep across North America, revolutionizing a spiritual hunger for God, and unifying Christians on the basis of New Testament basic principles, while liberating the spiritual landscape in Canada. The leaders of this movement sought to reform the church along non-sectarian, non-creedal lines with the preaching of the gospel of the Kingdom of Heaven.

The Evangelical Christian Church (Christian Disciples) as a separate group within the Restoration tradition was reorganized in 2001. The leaders believed in the essential unity of the body of Christ, they could not accept the sectarianism that was all around them. Several church bodies identifying with the Stone-Campbell movement today are very creedal and range from ultra-conservative to ultra-liberal as can be seen in the United Church of Christ which is an attempt to unite all Christian denominations into one national Church body as well as the National Association of Congregational Christian Churches which merged English Christians with American-Canadian Christians in 1931.

== Organization and structure ==
The Evangelical Christian Church (Christian Disciples) in Canada is non-denominational and its member churches are self-governing in the tradition of congregational polity. Ministers who are the Elders of the church are held accountable only to the scriptures, and guaranteed freedom of thought and conscience to practice their faith without doctrinal restrictions. The ECC maintains a high commitment to religious freedom, Christian unity, and the priesthood of all believers who make up the body of Christ. The ECC permits only those practices that it believes are found in the guidelines of New Testament living and worship as taught by the early church. The ECC divides the country into 10 districts assigned to district superintendents for liaison with the congregations and ministers in the appointed province. A hierarchical leadership is in place nationally, including the provincial superintendents, the general minister, the board of directors or general council, and regional field representatives. The general superintendent or constitute the executive staff. Ordinations are approved by the Credentials Standing Committee and ministerial credentials come from Central Office. Ordained or licensed ministers, both male and female, provide leadership for the church and preside over the ordinances.

== Ministries ==
The early participants in the Evangelical Christian Church (Christian Disciples) consisted of those who came away from a variety of fundamental, evangelical denominations, not in an attempt to reform any particular denomination, but rather in an effort to "restore" the "original" church according to the New Testament pattern, while basing its Biblical mission on the Great Commission found in the gospel of Matthew. They believed that history was moving toward a spiritual climax where God's power will be poured out on the church without the use of self-made religious doctrines. Promoters of restoration believed that this supernatural move could be the Lord's final move where the church will be endued with power to Christianize the world with the gospel of the Kingdom of God. In order for this Kingdom dominion pursuit to be realized, the Five-fold ministry expounded in Eph.4:11 (apostles, prophets, evangelists, pastors, and teachers) needed to be commissioned by the Church at large and given room to exercise their spiritual gifts with authority in the church of Jesus Christ.

== Membership trends ==
Within the North America Evangelical Christian Church, the Region of Canada, which had 30 churches and some 3500 members in the mid-1990s is unique in that it functions as a national church and has full denominational status at national and international levels. All Christian faiths were free to establish places of worship, train clergy, and proselytize to their faith.

== Sacraments ==
The Evangelical Christian Church (Christian Disciples) teaches that Jesus Christ instituted two ordinances as instruments of his grace, found in:

- Baptism, which is limited to those old enough to make a profession of faith and is commonly administered by immersion.
- The Lord's Supper is performed weekly, at which time all members partake of the emblems.

== Doctrine ==
The Evangelical Christian Church (Christian Disciples) in Canada has eleven Articles of Faith that are considered to be their definitive doctrinal statement:

== Colleges and universities ==
- Waterloo Bible College

== Memberships ==
The Evangelical Christian Church in Canada is an affiliated denominational member of the Evangelical Fellowship of Canada. The ECCC serves to work and network with other affiliated denominations on critical ministry issues, as well as public issues facing all evangelical Christians. The ECCC and other affiliated denominations participate in the consultations, forums and roundtables that are hosted by the EFC in order to promote collaboration and ministry partnerships.

== Key figures ==
- Barton Stone (1772–1844)
- Alexander Campbell (1788–1866)
- Thomas Campbell (clergyman) (1763–1854)

== See also ==
- List of Christian denominations
- List of Christian denominations by number of members
- Christian Church
- Christian primitivism
- History of Christianity
- Second Great Awakening
- Christianity
- Christianity in the 18th century
- Christianity in the 19th century
