= Church of Christ, Instrumental =

The Church of Christ, Instrumental, also known as Kelleyites, are a baptistic body of Christians based in central Arkansas.

== Names ==
In the only book written about this group they are called the Church of Christ, Instrumental or Kelleyites. Elder E. J. Lambert, a Primitive Baptist minister who was raised among this body, and whose father was a minister of the Church of Christ, Instrumental, in his autobiography consistently refers to them as the Church of Christ (Kelly Division of Missionary Baptists). They are referred to as Kelleyites in official documents of the Works Progress Administration in the 1940s.

== History ==
The Kelleyites owe their name and origin to Samuel Kelley. Kelley was born in 1817 in what is now Pike County, Arkansas, but in early adulthood he moved to Illinois. In Illinois, he first connected himself to the Methodists, but later joined the Baptists and was ordained by them in 1838. Shortly after this he returned to Arkansas. A difference in practice between the Baptists with whom he was connected in Illinois and the Baptists in Arkansas was evidently a contributing factor to the rise of the Kelley division of the missionary Baptist church. Among other things, the Baptists in Illinois received Samuel Kelley on his Methodist baptism, which was foreign to the practice of Arkansas Baptists.

Kelley was a prominent and successful citizen by the standards of his day. He lived in Pike County and later in Howard County. He was elected to at least one term in the State Legislature. His church was a member of the Red River Baptist Association. In 1856, Kelley was invited to preach at the meeting of the Caddo River Baptist Association. In this sermon, he preached the doctrine of apostasy, or falling from grace. The next morning the Caddo River Association passed resolutions against Elder Kelley, his doctrine of apostasy, the fact he had not been baptized by a Baptist, and also withdrew fellowship from the Red River Association. The next year the Red River Association excluded Samuel Kelley and his followers. Kelley evidently preached between 1857 and 1870 wherever he could. In 1870, Kelley convinced the Philippi Baptist Church to adopt open communion and change their name to the Philippi Church of Christ. The only change to "Church of Christ" would simply mean dropping the Baptist name from the common practice of that day (i.e., Philippi Baptist Church of Christ becomes Philippi Church of Christ). This church withdrew from the Caddo River Association that year, and the Caddo River Association also withdrew from them. This can be considered the official date of the division of the Kelleyites from the Baptists (although persons such as Elder Lambert still considered them to be Missionary Baptists). Other churches were organized and existing churches adopted the doctrine and practice of the Kelleyites, and this movement grew for a time. Later the movement would decline, and now (2003) survives with 5 churches - 4 in Hot Spring County, Arkansas and 1 in Clark County, Arkansas. Membership is estimated at 400 in the 5 congregations. Perhaps the ecumenical nature of the church's doctrine, rather than lack of evangelization, has led to the decline in churches and membership.

== Doctrine and practice ==
After their separation from the Caddo River and Red River Associations, the Kelleyites formed The Council of the Church of Christ. This council is fashioned on the order of a Baptist association and meets annually. Rules are similar and they preserve the autonomy of the local church. The council has no authority to act on local church matters, nor even to advise unless the church asks them to do so.

The major differences doctrinally between the Kelleyites and the missionary Baptists of Arkansas at the time of division was that the Kelleyites held final apostasy (or falling from grace), open communion, and alien baptism. The Kelleyite theology is somewhat of a mixture of old time Methodist and Baptist doctrine. They are similar in doctrine and practice to the Free Will Baptists, but have evidently never had any connection with them. In addition to baptism and the Lord's supper, they also hold feet washing as an ordinance. This is an issue that would separate them from most present-day missionary Baptists in Arkansas, but would have been of little consequence in the mid-19th century. The church has three offices: pastor, elder, and deacon. The Kelleyites preserve their links to the Baptists by using the Sunday School literature of the American Baptist Association.

The church doctrine is ecumenical in nature, but article 14 (adopted in 1952) of their constitution states, "No minister, except regular ordained ministers of the Church of Christ, shall be permitted to preach or conduct services in any individual church without special permission from the pastor and members of that particular church. (Exceptions being made for funerals.)" This article reveals an interest in self-preservation - though they desire fellowship with other Christians, they also seek to preserve what they feel in their unique heritage.

The churches often label their church signs as Church of Christ, Instrumental to differentiate them from the Churches of Christ (non-instrumental) movement of Alexander Campbell and others.
