= Brush Run Church =

Church building in Pennsylvania, U.S.

Coordinates: 40°12′55.18″N 80°24′31.66″W

The Brush Run Church was one of the earliest congregations associated with the Restoration Movement that arose during the Second Great Awakening of the early 19th century. In 1811, a congregation of Christian reformers known as the Christian Association of Washington (Pennsylvania) reconstituted itself as a church and constructed a new building to replace the temporary log building where they began. Because it was built on the farm of William Gilchrist, near a stream called Brush Run, both the building and the congregation became known as Brush Run Church. It was the center of activity for Thomas and Alexander Campbell, father and son respectively, in their movement for Christian reform on the American frontier. The meeting house was later used as a blacksmith shop, then as a post office and finally it was moved to Bethany, Virginia (now West Virginia).

== History of the church ==
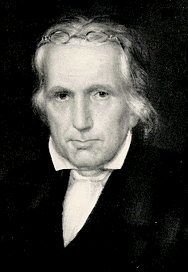
Thomas Campbell

In 1809, Thomas Campbell, a "seceder" Presbyterian minister who had emigrated from Scotland to western Pennsylvania, established the Christian Association of Washington as a result of his groundbreaking theological treatise, entitled "The Declaration and Address of the Christian Association of Washington." On May 4, 1811, the Association reconstituted itself as a congregationally governed church. It constructed a meeting house which became known as the Brush Run Church. It, along with the Cane Ridge Meeting House in Paris, Kentucky, is considered to be one of the first churches in the Christian group which later became known as the Christian Church (Disciples of Christ).

For nearly fifteen years the Brush Run Church served as the principal worship and communion location for the Thomas Campbell (father) and Alexander (son) inspired and led portion of an American frontier reform movement called at various times and in varying locations: The New Reformation; The disciples of Christ; the Reformers; the Primitive New Testament Church; the Restoration Movement; the Brotherhood; the Church (or Churches) of Christ; the Campbellites; the Christians—as well as other labels attempting an identification depicting the central message or emphasis of the Movement.

At the first meeting in the Brush Run Church, June 16, 1811, three people requested immersion. Inasmuch as they had not previously been sprinkled Thomas Campbell baptized them. The birth of Alexander Campbell's first child, March 13, 1812, made the question of infant baptism of vital importance to him. He restudied the whole question and became convinced that infant baptism is without New Testament sanction. He decided that the child should not be sprinkled. This raised a further question in his mind. If infant baptism is without New Testament sanction, then one who was sprinkled in infancy has not been baptized. On June 12, 1812, Thomas and Alexander Campbell, their wives, and three others were immersed by a Baptist preacher (Rev. Mathias Luce) in Buffalo Creek on a simple confession of faith in Christ.

Alexander Campbell seems to have taken the lead from this time. It was not long until most of the members of the Brush Run Church had been immersed, and this brought them favor with the Baptists. Alexander Campbell visited the Redstone Baptist Association shortly after he had been immersed, but was not favorably impressed. During the year, however, he visited among the Baptist churches and formed a more favorable opinion. After much discussion the Brush Run Church made application to the Redstone Association in the autumn of 1813 for admission. They presented a lengthy statement of the conditions under which they would be willing to unite with the Association. They formally accepted the Philadelphia Confession, provided they be allowed to preach and teach whatever they learned from the Holy Scriptures "regardless of any creed or formula in Christendom."

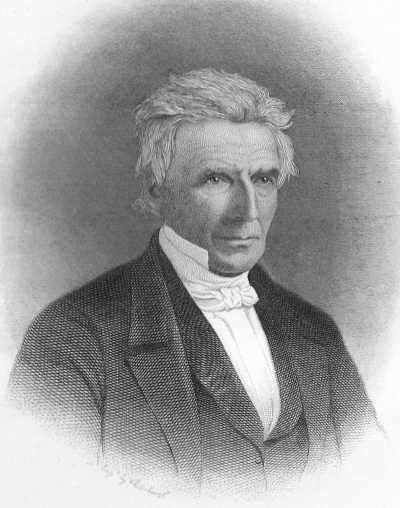
Alexander Campbell, Age 65

A majority of the Redstone Association voted to receive the Brush Run Church on the basis of its statement. Some of the ministers protested, insisting that such a course was to invite trouble. There were many fundamental points of difference between the Brush Run Church and the regular Baptist churches, and these were gradually to become more pronounced. In 1816 Alexander Campbell preached his famous Sermon on the Law, in which he maintained that we are under the new covenant, and hence must be guided by the New Testament rather than the Old Testament.

After Alexander Campbell's marriage to Miss Margaret Brown, her father deeded him a fine farm, which is now the site of Bethany, West Virginia. This provided him a living so that he was free to travel among the churches where he was received with great favor. John Walker, the pastor of the Presbyterian Church of Mount Pleasant, Ohio, had challenged Mr. Birch, who was pastor of the Baptist Church in that place, or any other Baptist preacher, to debate the subject of baptism. Alexander Campbell was urged to accept this challenge, and the debate was held June 19 and 20, 1820. His success in this debate made him many friends among the Baptists especially in the Mahoning Association where the debate was held.

Because of increased opposition on the part of some of the leaders of the Redstone Association, Alexander Campbell and some others withdrew from the Brush Run Church and established a church in Wellsburg in 1823. This church was received into the Mahoning Association in Ohio. In 1823 Mr. Campbell debated the subject of infant baptism with W. L. Maccalla in Mason County, Kentucky. As a result of this debate his popularity increased, and he was urged to make a tour of the Baptist churches of Kentucky. Thus his influence was extended in those sections where the Disciples were to have the greatest strength when they became separated from the Baptists.

According to Leroy Garrett, the Brush run church existed until about 1828, at which time it moved into Bethany.

== History of the meeting house ==
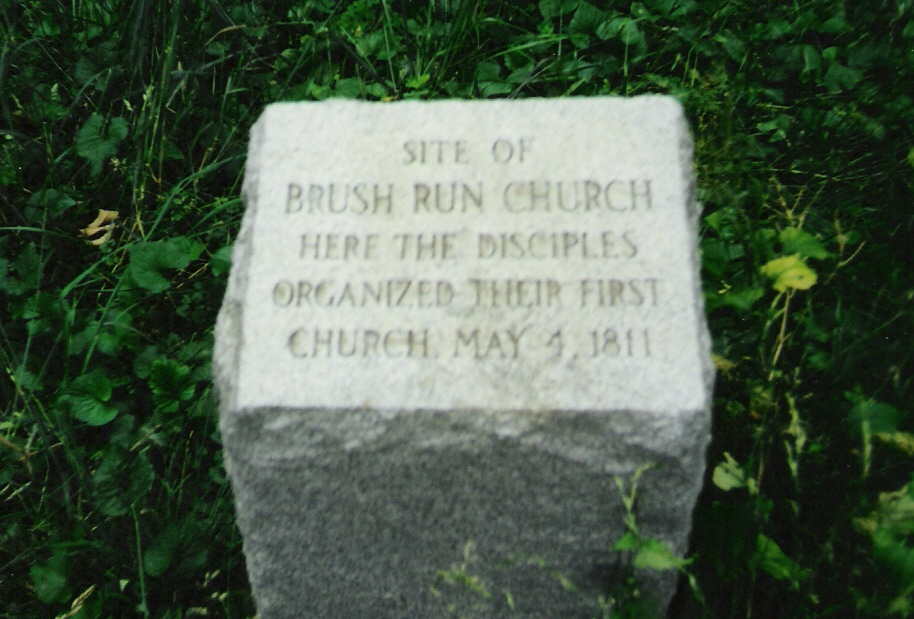
Brush Run Historic Marker

The meeting house was located in Washington County, Pennsylvania on the farm of William Gilchrist in the valley of the Brush Run, about two miles (3 km) above the junction of that stream with Buffalo Creek. Currently, the original location of the building is commemorated by a stone marker.

John Boyd, who had a saw mill on Brush Run a short distance from the construction site, was contracted, with the help of members, to build the Meeting House. The congregation of Christian reformers was evolving from the Christian Association of Washington (Pennsylvania). The Meeting House was then used in conjunction with the "Cross Roads" log building, in which the Association had been meeting, and replaced a temporary shelter (often called a "brush arbor") which had been used on this site for preaching—including Alexander Campbell's first sermon. This site was located on a "Saddle Ridge" between Hanen Creek and Brush Run on 2 acres (8,100 m^{2}) of land transferred ($1.00 bill-of-sale) from the farm of William Gilchrist, an active member of the Association and one of four deacons in the new congregation. The building and congregation were soon known as the Brush Run Church, despite the fact that on the Ordination Certificate of Alexander Campbell (1812), the ordaining body is referred to as "The First Christian Church of the Christian Association of Washington."

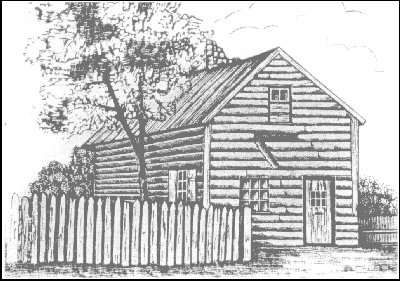
Later illustration of Brush Run Church after it became a post office

The actual Meeting House, a post and beam structure pinned together with wooden pins, was a treasure in framing and could be taken down and moved. Never completely finished and having ceased to be used regularly, with churches now developed in the home communities of many members, the church building was sold to George McFadden, dismantled and moved to West Middletown in 1842. Here he used it as his blacksmith shop until appointed postmaster in 1869 at which time he located the post office in this building. When he retired William Anderson, the neighbor across the road, received the building as a gift for his willingness to move it. On the Anderson property it served as a barn and stable, until visitors from the 1909 Centennial Convention held in Pittsburgh, PA some thirty miles distance, instituted a program to reconstruct, from remaining timbers, the old Meeting House onto the Campbell Homestead in Bethany, West Virginia.

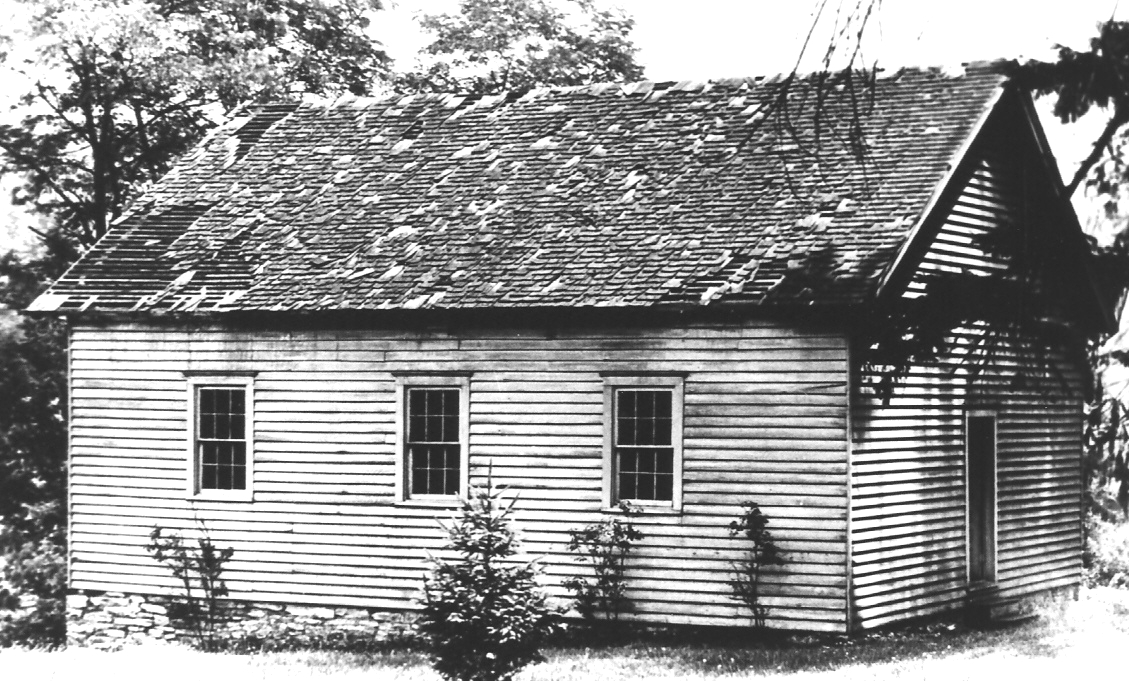
Photo of Brush Run Church at Bethany

The picture reproduced above right is a drawing of the Meeting House when it served as a post office following several years as a blacksmith shop. This becomes evident by observing in the picture the letter slot in the door (i.e. post office) and the well worn chimney top (i.e. blacksmith furnace heat) remembering that this Meeting House, on its original location, had no means of heating. Subsequent paintings of the structure apparently used this drawing as an example, placing the slot in the door, worn chimney at roof ridge and showing the drooping clapboard siding on the front.

According to The Encyclopedia of the Stone-Campbell Movement, the Brush Run meeting house was sold in 1842 and moved to West Middletown, Pennsylvania. It was eventually moved to the Campbell homestead. The structure deteriorated, and its remainder was removed in 1990.

== See also ==
- Disciples of Christ (Campbell Movement)
