= Churches of Christ in Europe =

Christian groups of autonomous congregations in Europe

Churches of Christ
- Classification: Protestant
- Orientation: Restorationist
- Polity: Congregationalist

The Churches of Christ in Europe are Christian groups of autonomous congregations using the name "church of Christ" which may or may not have a historical association with the Restoration Movement. These groups are characterized by an emphasis on basing doctrine and practice on the Bible alone in order to restore the New Testament church they believe to have been established by Jesus.

== Worship and devotion ==
Key features of the church's worship are the weekly observance of the Lord's Supper presided over by one or more of the men of the church, believer's baptism leading to salvation, and a cappella singing.

== History in Central Europe ==
The time in which the churches of Christ in Central Europe began is not agreed upon. Some have said that the churches of Christ began with the American Restoration Movement. However, Hans Godwin Grimm, author of the book Tradition and History of the Early Churches of Christ In Central Europe, born in 1899, wrote that in March 1955 he met for the first time in his life "a member of the restored churches of Christ of America." Grimm continued, saying, "What he had to tell me was not other than the faith of my ancestors which I had taught and practiced all my life. ... the American Restoration Movement had been totally unknown to us."

== History in Great Britain ==
Whilst the Churches of Christ in Britain initially grew as separate and spontaneous local, self-inspired movements, only later joining up into a coordinated movement, John Davies of Mollington was essentially the founding leader among the key figures who created the Churches of Christ in Britain. He had become the movement's first preacher at the age of 16 in 1809, even before he knew of the existence of like-minded people in America or elsewhere in Britain, he later connected with Alexander Campbell to connect the British and American movements, and served as the British Churches of Christ's first President from their inaugural meeting in 1842 until his death in 1865. In the early 1800s, Scottish Baptists were influenced by the writings of Alexander Campbell in the Christian Baptist and Millennial Harbinger. A group in Nottingham withdrew from the Scotch Baptist church in 1836 to form a Church of Christ. James Wallis, a member of that group, founded a magazine named The British Millennial Harbinger in 1837. In 1842 the first Cooperative Meeting of Churches of Christ in Great Britain was held in Edinburgh. Approximately 50 congregations were involved, representing a membership of 1,600. The name "Churches of Christ" was formally adopted at an annual meeting in 1870. Alexander Campbell influenced the British Restoration Movement indirectly through his writings; he visited Britain for several months in 1847, and "presided at the Second Cooperative Meeting of the British Churches at Chester". At that time the movement had grown to encompass 80 congregations with a total membership of 2,300. Annual meetings were held after 1847.

The use of instrumental music in worship was not a source of division among the Churches of Christ in Great Britain before World War I. More significant was the issue of pacifism; a national conference was established in 1916 for congregations that opposed the war. A conference for "Old Paths" congregations was first held in 1924. The issues involved included concern that the Christian Association was compromising traditional principles in seeking ecumenical ties with other organizations and a sense that it had abandoned Scripture as "an all-sufficient rule of faith and practice". Two "Old Paths" congregations withdrew from the Association in 1931; an additional two withdrew in 1934, and nineteen more withdrew between 1943 and 1947.

Membership declined rapidly during and after the First World War. The Association of Churches of Christ in Britain disbanded in 1980. Most Association congregations (approximately 40) united with the United Reformed Church in 1981. In the same year, twenty-four other congregations formed a Fellowship of Churches of Christ. The Fellowship developed ties with the Christian churches and churches of Christ during the 1980s.

=== Theology ===
As a result of their different history and the influence of the Scottish Baptists, British Churches of Christ have, when compared to the American Restoration Movement, placed a relatively greater emphasis on restoring the New Testament church than they have on unity. During the 1800s, the internal dialogue of the British churches was characterized more by rationalism than by evangelicalism. They put greater emphasis on convincing adherents of other churches than on converting non-Christians. In the early 20th century, they became more open to ecumenism. By the 1960s relatively few ministers of the British Churches of Christ had a conservative, evangelical approach to theology. By the 1980s, strong allegiance to restorationism was limited to the a cappella congregations.
