= Living Oracles =

New Testament translation by Alexander Campbell

- Full name: The Living Oracles
- NT published: 1826
- Copyright: Public Domain
- John 3:16...for God so loved the world, as to give his only begotten Son, that whoever believes on him, may not perish, but obtain eternal life.

The Living Oracles is a translation of the New Testament compiled and edited by the early Restoration Movement leader Alexander Campbell. Published in 1826, it was based on an 1818 combined edition of translations by George Campbell, James MacKnight and Philip Doddridge, and included edits and extensive notes by Campbell.

== Characteristics ==
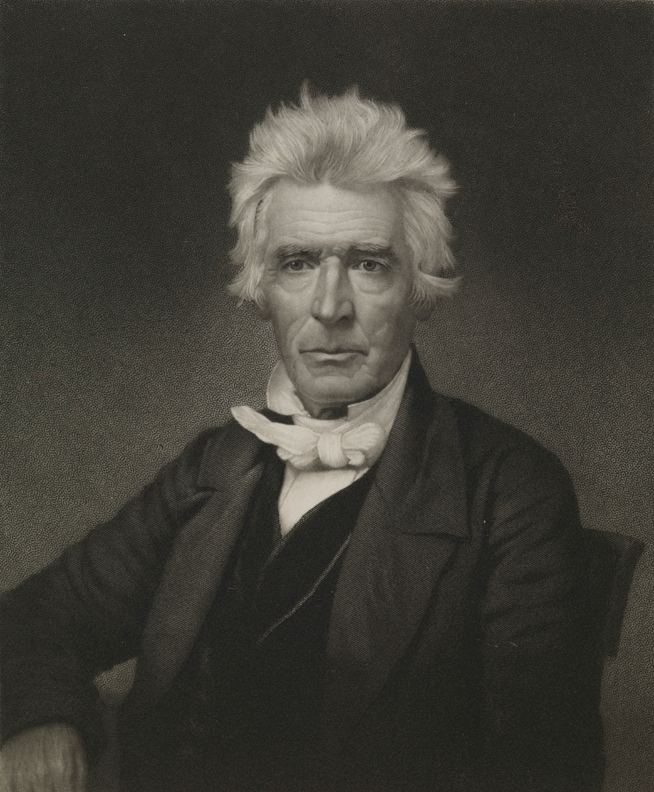
Alexander Campbell

Campbell was motivated by a belief that changes in the English language and the availability of improved critical editions of the Greek New Testament had made the Authorized King James Version obsolete. In developing the translation, Campbell relied on the critical Greek text published by Johann Jakob Griesbach. One notable feature of the translation is the replacement of traditional ecclesiastical terms such as "church" and "baptise" with alternative translations such as "congregation" and "immerse". The Living Oracles has been described as a forerunner of modern language translations in its updating of the traditional King James language and use of the work of textual critics such as Griesbach.

== Reception ==
The translation was widely used within the Restoration Movement, but was criticized by others for its translation of βαπτίζω (baptizô) as "immerse" rather than "baptize". Because of the way this word was translated, the Living Oracles was most often used by those who believed in immersion baptism and most vigorously criticized by groups practicing infant baptism by sprinkling.
