= Caroline Neville Pearre =

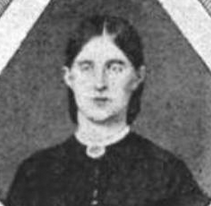
- Caroline Neville Pearre, 1894
- Born: 1834
- Died: 1910 (aged 75–76); Kentucky
- Known for: Founder of Christian Woman's Board of Missions

Caroline Neville Pearre (1834–1910) began the Christian Woman's Board of Missions (CWBM) in 1874, after she felt that she was called to do so by God. Pearre was living in Iowa City, Iowa at the time, having taught at Christian colleges in Missouri, Kentucky and Ohio. The wife of a Disciples of Christ pastor, Pearre organized a missionary society in her own church in Iowa City. Friends of hers in other Christian churches organized similar missionary societies in their churches. These various societies united and formed the American Christian Missionary Society which became the Christian Women's Board of Missions (CWBM).

Pearre died in 1910, in her sister's home in Kentucky. She was buried in Lexington.
