= Church of Christ in LaRoche Township =

Historic church in South Dakota, United States

- U.S. National Register of Historic Places
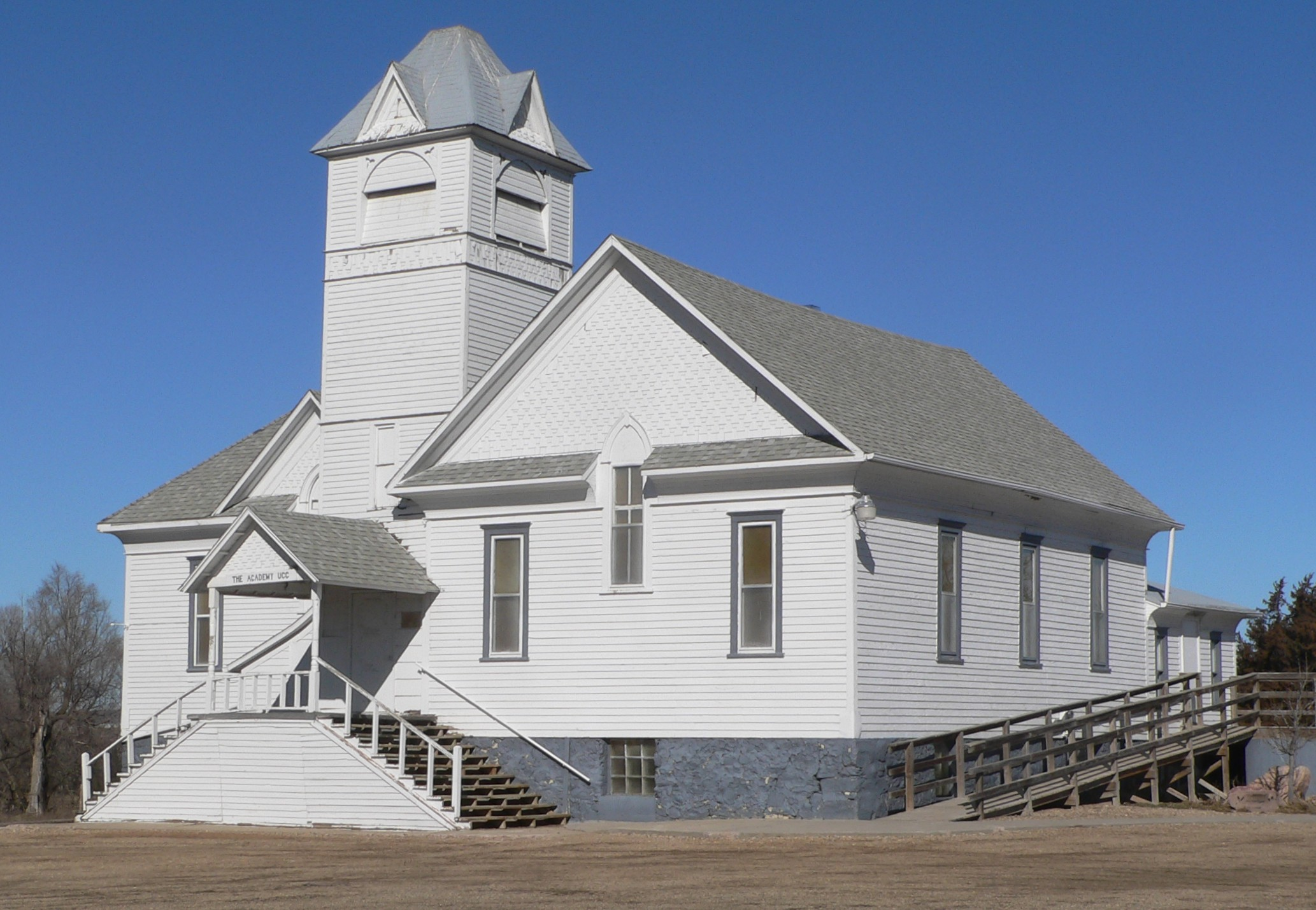

- Location within South Dakota Location within the United States
- Location: Academy, South Dakota
- Coordinates: 43.455645°N 99.082491°W
- Built: 1900
- NRHP reference No.: 82003920
- Added to NRHP: July 1, 1982

Church of Christ in LaRoche Township (also known as Academy Congregational Church) is a church in Academy, South Dakota. It was added to the National Register of Historic Places in 1982.

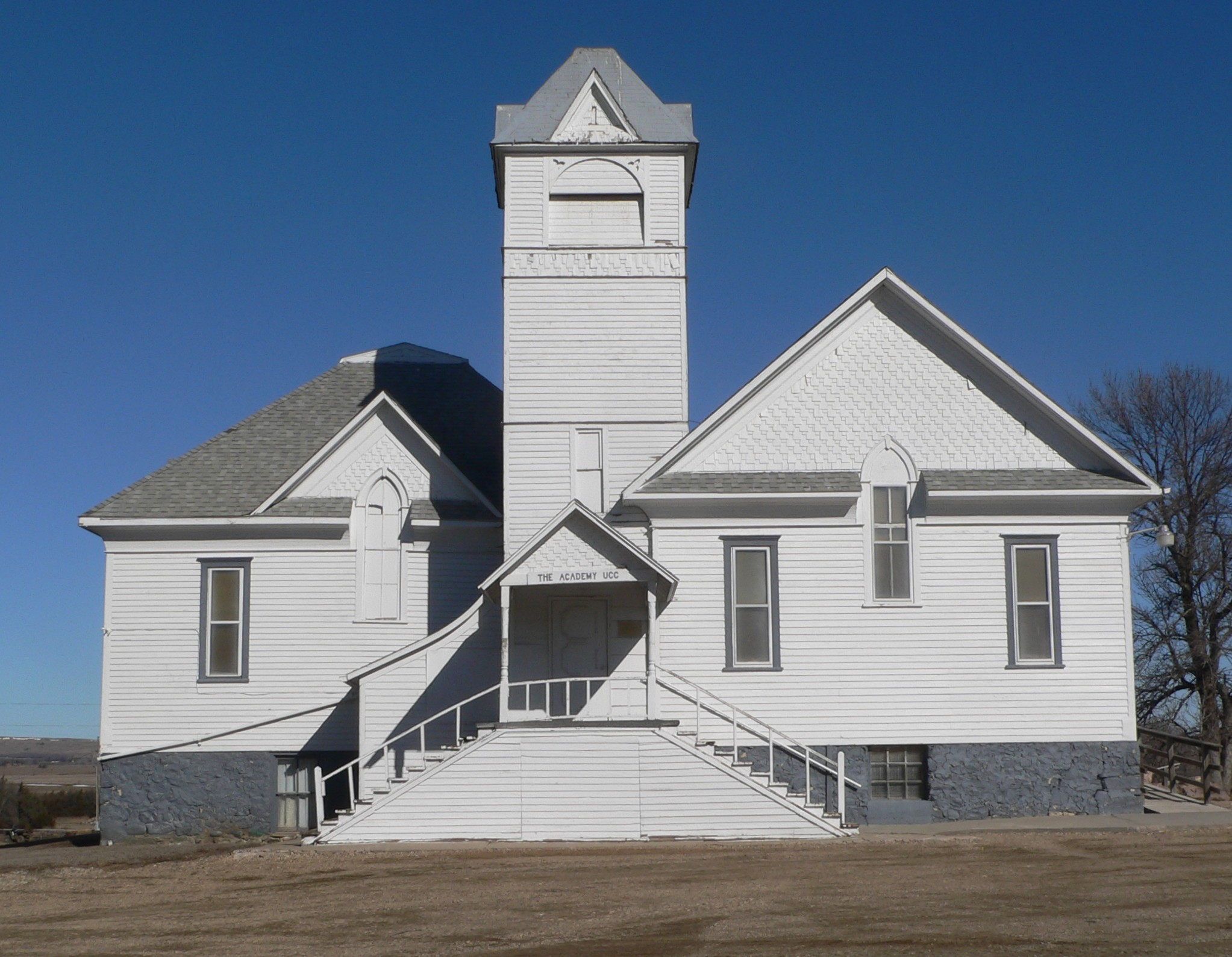
View from south

The church was built in three sections, the first being the original, one-story Church of Christ in LaRoche Township built in 1893. In 1898 the Colvin Church was moved to 6.5 feet (2.0 m) to the site by 42 horses, and was attached to the west side. In 1902 a rear annex was added.
