= Church of Christ, Swansea =

Historic church in Massachusetts, United States

- United Church of Christ, Swansea
- U.S. National Register of Historic Places
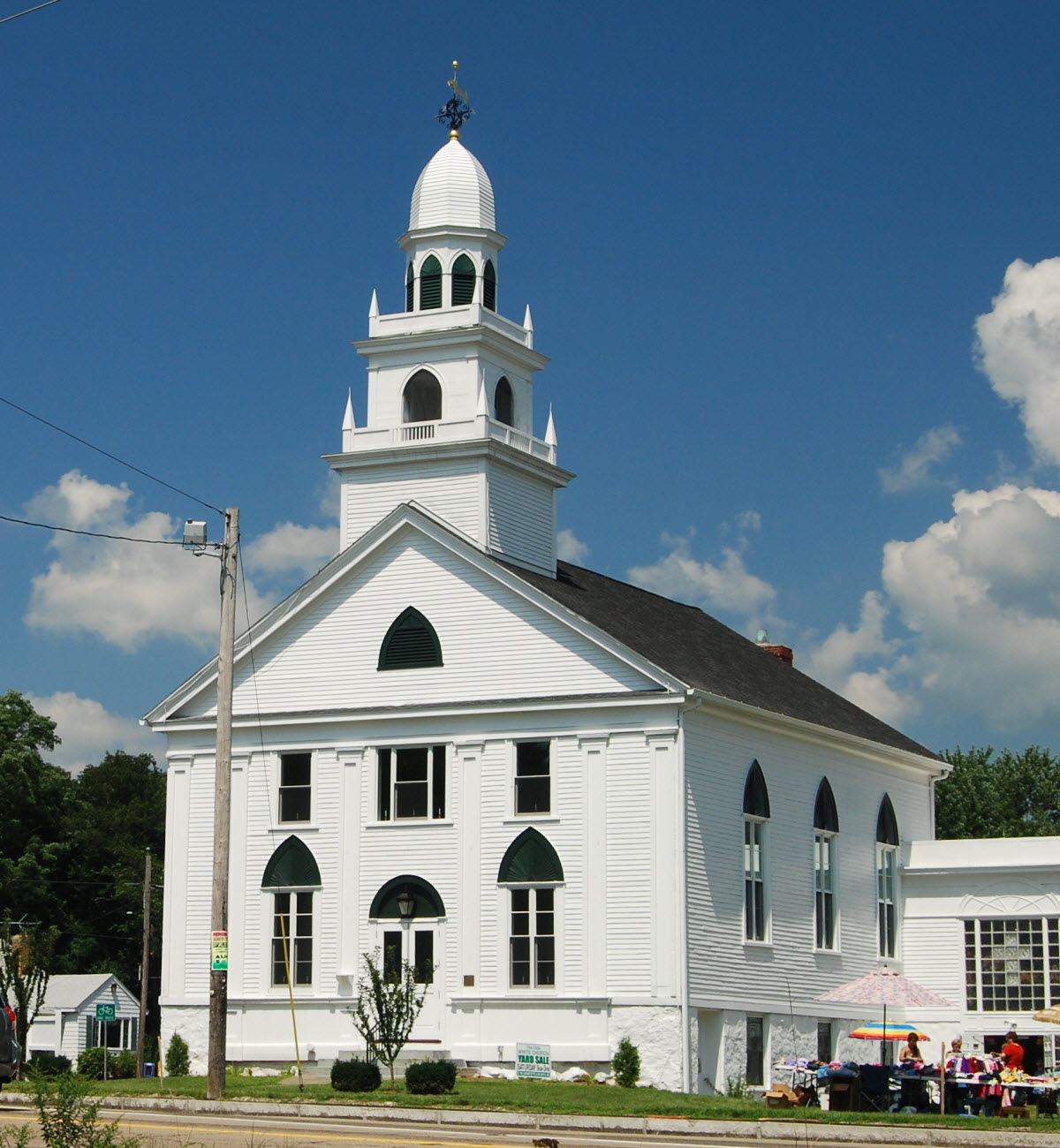

- Location within Massachusetts Location within the United States
- Location: 1113 G.A.R. Highway, Swansea, Massachusetts
- Coordinates: 41°45′3″N 71°13′31″W
- Built: 1833
- Architectural style: Greek Revival
- MPS: Swansea MRA
- NRHP reference No.: 90000075
- Added to NRHP: February 16, 1990

The United Church of Christ, Swansea (also known as First Christian Congregational Church and Swansea White Church) is a historic church along United States Route 6 in Swansea, Massachusetts. The current Greek Revival church building was built in 1833 for a congregation with a recorded history of meetings dating to 1680. The church was listed on the National Register of Historic Places in 1990. The congregation is affiliated with the United Church of Christ; its current pastor is Rev. Anne Weirich.

The church is well known for its ecclesiastical independence, never having had a legal connection with the town and therefore never supported by taxation.

== Architecture and history ==
The United Church of Christ, Swansea, is located at the northeast corner of GAR Highway and Maple Avenue in central Swansea. It is a 1 1/2-story wood-frame structure, oriented to face south, with a gable roof and a three-stage tower. The main facade is divided into five bays by six pilasters, with a double-door entrance at the center under a rounded arch. Flanking windows on the first floor are topped by lancet-arch fans, a detail repeated at the center of the fully pedimented gable end above, and above the windows on the side walls. The tower's first stage is plain, with a railing and corner pinnacles surrounding the smaller belfry stage above. The railing and pinnacles are repeated at the top of the belfry, which is topped by an octagonal cupola with louvered lancet openings. The original main block is extended to the rear, with a modern addition extending eastward from those additions.

The church was built in 1830–33 for a congregation that is one of the oldest in New England, and is distinctive for its lack of municipal support in the colonial years when there was no separation of church and state. The congregation's earliest documented services were held in 1680, although it was not formally organized until 1693; its first meetinghouse was built in 1720. The current church is its second building, and was constructed after the roof was blown off the first one.

== See also ==
- National Register of Historic Places listings in Bristol County, Massachusetts
