= Thomas Campbell (minister) =

Irish Presbyterian minister (1763–1854)

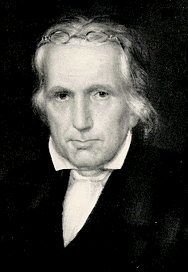
- Born: 1 February 1763; County Down, Ireland
- Died: 4 January 1854 (aged 90); Bethany, West Virginia, U.S.
- Occupation: Minister
- Known for: Beginning the "Disciples of Christ" movement in America
- Notable work: Declaration and Address of the Christian Association of Washington (1809)
- Children: Alexander Campbell

Thomas Campbell (1 February 1763 – 4 January 1854) was an Irish–American Presbyterian minister who became prominent during the Second Great Awakening of the United States. Born in County Down, he began a religious reform movement on the American frontier. He was joined in the work by his son, Alexander. Their movement, known as the "Disciples of Christ", merged in 1832 with the similar movement led by Barton W. Stone to form what is now described as the American Restoration Movement (also known as the Stone-Campbell Restoration Movement).

== Early life ==
Campbell was born in County Down, Ireland (now Northern Ireland), and raised as an Anglican. He was ordained a minister in the Scottish Seceder Presbyterian Church sometime after graduating from the University of Glasgow in 1786. Campbell left Ireland for the United States in April 1807. This move was prompted by the advice of his physician. Once in America, disagreement arose between Thomas and other Presbyterians over certain points related to Calvinist doctrine and the administration of the Eucharist.

== Role in the early Restoration Movement ==
The Campbell wing of the movement was launched when Thomas Campbell published the Declaration and address of the Christian Association of Washington in 1809. The Presbyterian Synod had suspended his ministerial credentials. In The Declaration and Address he set forth some of his convictions about the church of Jesus Christ, as he organised the Christian Association of Washington, in Washington County, Pennsylvania, not as a church but as an association of persons seeking to grow in faith. On 4 May 1811, the Christian Association reconstituted itself as a congregationally governed church. With the building it constructed at Brush Run, Pennsylvania, it became known as Brush Run Church.

When their study of the New Testament led the reformers to begin to practice baptism by immersion, the nearby Redstone Baptist Association invited Brush Run Church to join with them for the purpose of fellowship. The reformers agreed, provided that they would be "allowed to preach and to teach whatever they learned from the Scriptures."

Thomas and his son Alexander worked within the Redstone Baptist Association during the period 1815 through 1824. While both the Campbells and the Baptists shared practices of baptism by immersion and congregational polity, it was soon clear that the Campbells and their associates were not traditional Baptists. Within the Redstone Association, some of the Baptist leaders considered the differences intolerable when Alexander Campbell began publishing a journal, The Christian Baptist, which promoted reform. The Campbells anticipated the conflict and moved their membership to a congregation of the Mahoning Baptist Association in 1824.

== Theological influences ==
Campbell was a student of the Enlightenment philosopher John Locke. While he did not explicitly use the term "essentials", in the Declaration and Address, Campbell proposed the same solution to religious division as had been advanced earlier by Herbert and Locke: "[R]educe religion to a set of essentials upon which all reasonable persons might agree." The essentials he identified were those practices for which the Bible provided "a 'Thus saith the Lord,' either in express terms or by approved precedent." Unlike Locke, who saw the earlier efforts by Puritans as inherently divisive, Campbell argued for "a complete restoration of apostolic Christianity." Thomas believed that creeds served to divide Christians. He also believed that the Bible was clear enough that anyone could understand it and, thus, creeds were unnecessary.

Thomas Campbell combined the Enlightenment approach to unity with the Reformed and Puritan traditions of restoration. The Enlightenment affected the Campbell movement in two ways. First, it provided the idea that Christian unity could be achieved by finding a set of essentials that all reasonable people could agree on. The second was the concept of a rational faith that was formulated and defended on the basis of a set of facts derived from the Bible.

== Life events ==
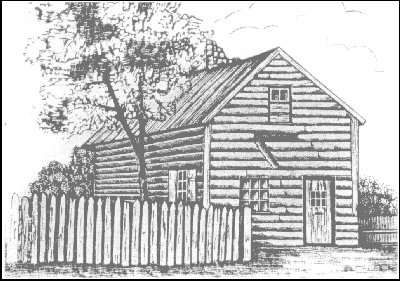
First Meeting house of the Disciples in Brush Run, Pennsylvania, built in 1811 by the Christian Association of Washington

- Born 1 February 1763 in County Down, Ireland.
- Immigrated to the United States in 1807, settling in western Pennsylvania.
- In 1809, Campbell published The Declaration and Address of the Christian Association of Washington, a document stating his ideas about how the Christian faith should be practised. It was a starting point for the Campbell–Stone Movement, which led to development of the Christian Church (Disciples of Christ), the Churches of Christ and the Christian churches and churches of Christ.
- In 1812, Campbell joined his son Alexander and began practising baptism by immersion.
- Shortly after his oldest son, Alexander Campbell, was ordained in 1812, Thomas began playing a supporting role to Alexander. Thomas was generally less radical than his son, and was a stabilising influence on the movement.
- Thomas died on 4 January 1854 in Bethany, West Virginia and was buried next to his wife in the Campbell family cemetery.
