= Alexander Campbell (minister) =

Scots-Irish American ordained minister (1788–1866)

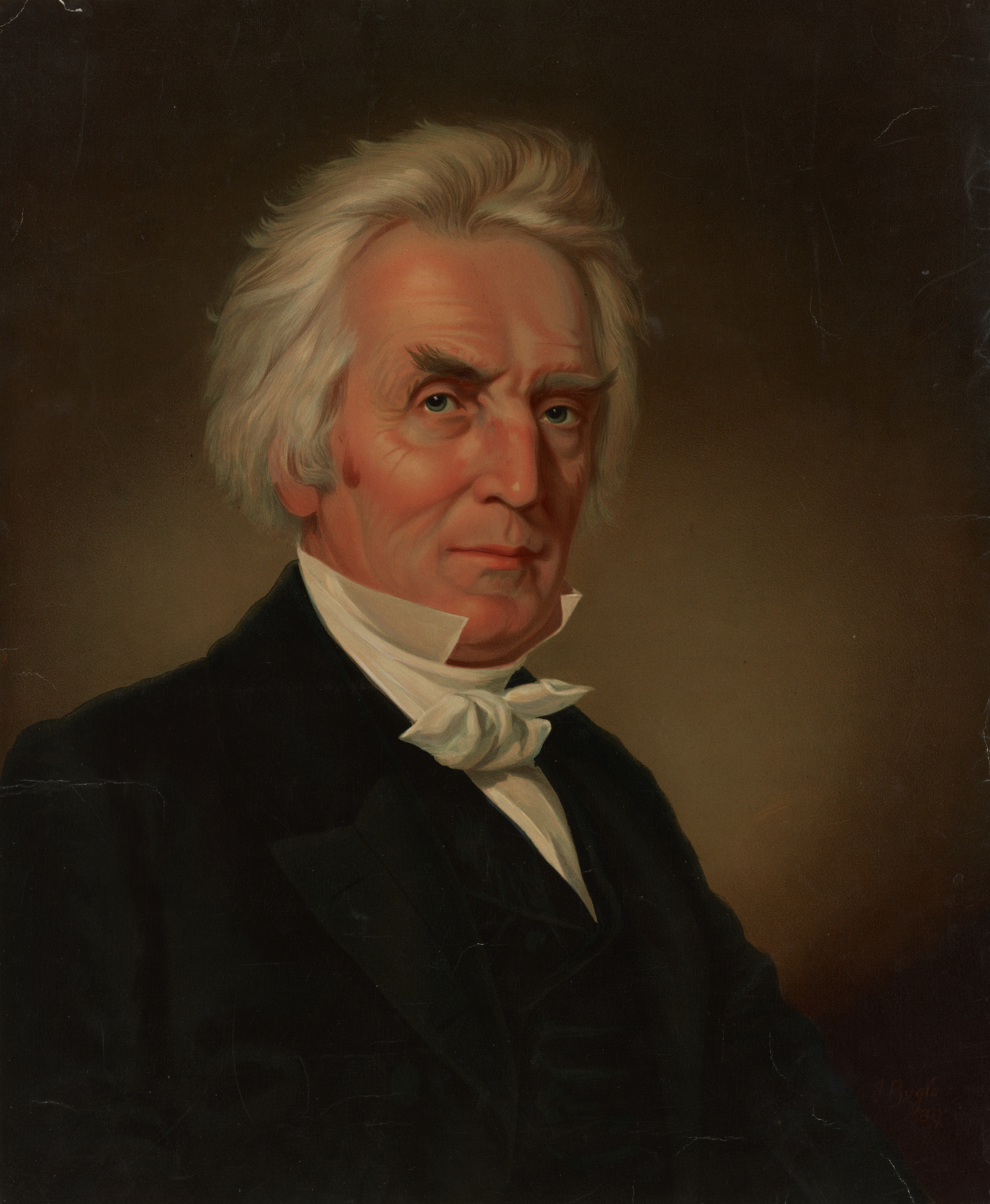
- Campbell around 1855
- Born: 12 September 1788; Broughshane, County Antrim, Ireland
- Died: 4 March 1866 (aged 77); Bethany, West Virginia, U.S.
- Burial place: God's Acre, Bethany, West Virginia, U.S.
- Education: University of Glasgow
- Spouses: Margaret Brown (m. 1811; died 1827) Selina Huntington Bakewell (m. 1828)
- Children: 14
- Father: Thomas Campbell

Ecclesiastical career
- Religion: Christianity (Churches of Christ)
- Ordained: 1 January 1812
- Writings: Christian Baptist; Living Oracles; Millennial Harbinger; The Christian System
- Congregations: Brush Run Church; Bethany Church of Christ

1st President of Bethany College
- In office 1840 – 4 March 1866
- Preceded by: Position established
- Succeeded by: William K. Pendelton

2nd President of the General Convention of the American Christian Missionary Society
- In office 1850–1866
- Preceded by: David S. Burnet
- Succeeded by: David S. Burnet

Alexander Campbell (12 September 1788 – 4 March 1866) was an Ulster Scots immigrant who became an ordained minister in the United States and joined his father Thomas Campbell as a leader of a reform effort that is historically known as the Restoration Movement, and by some as the "Stone-Campbell Movement". It resulted in the development of non-denominational Christian churches, which stressed reliance on scripture and few essentials.

Campbell was influenced by similar efforts in Scotland, in particular, by James and Robert Haldane, who emphasized their interpretation of Christianity as found in the New Testament. In 1832, the group of reformers led by the Campbells merged with a similar movement that began under the leadership of Barton W. Stone in Kentucky. Their congregations identified as Disciples of Christ or Christian churches.

Several church groups have some historical ties with Campbell's efforts. The three main groups are the Churches of Christ, the Christian Church (Disciples of Christ), and the independent Christian churches and churches of Christ. Additionally, there are the International Churches of Christ, the International Christian Church, the Churches of Christ in Australia, the Churches of Christ in Europe, and the Evangelical Christian Church in Canada. Campbell also founded Bethany College in what became Bethany, West Virginia.

== Early life and education ==
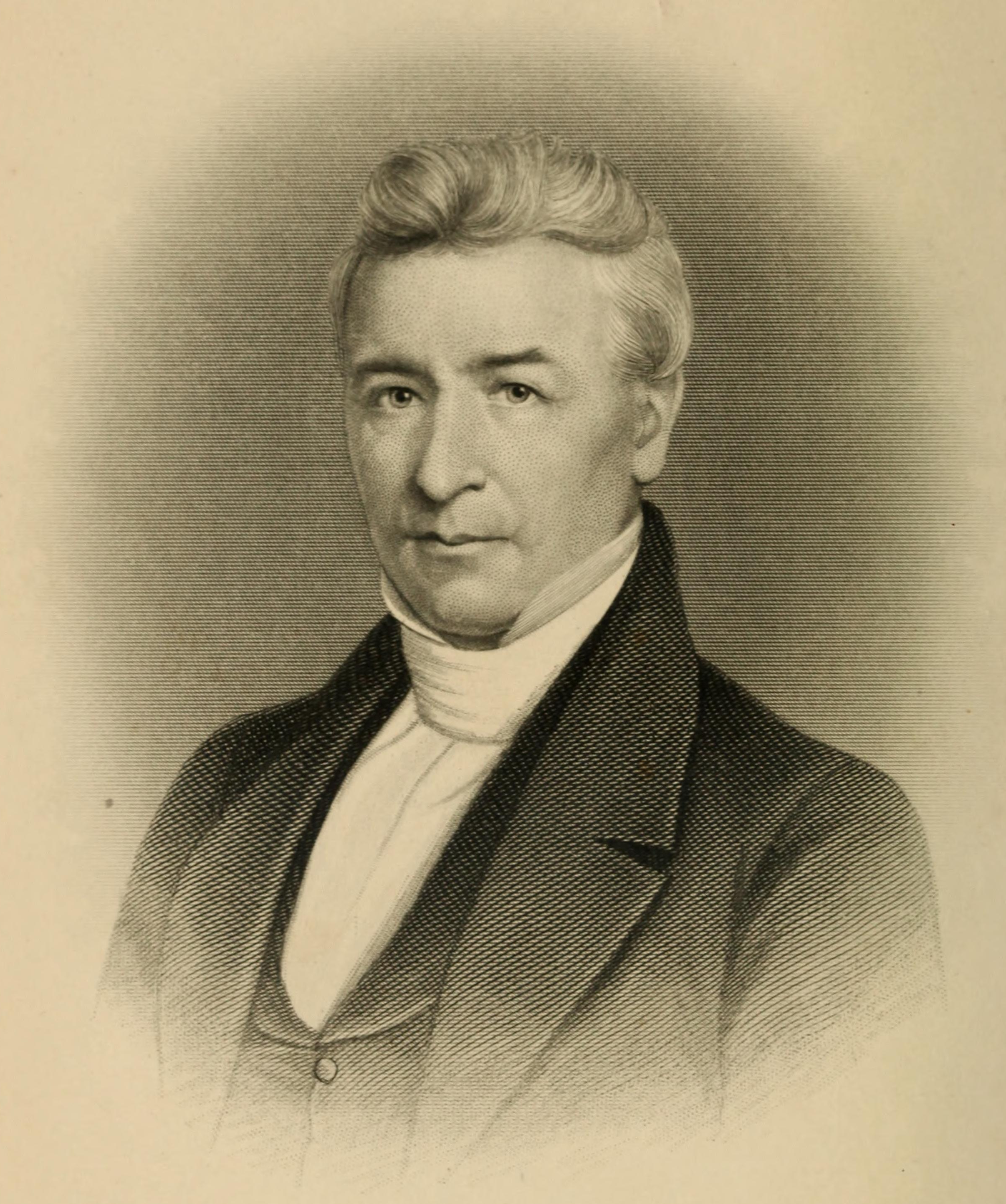
Young Alexander Campbell

Alexander Campbell was born 12 September 1788 near Ballymena, in the parish of Broughshane, County Antrim, Ireland. His parents were Thomas Campbell and Jane Corneigle Campbell, who were of Scots descent. Like his father, he was educated at the University of Glasgow, where he was greatly influenced by Scottish Enlightenment philosophy. He was also influenced by the English philosopher John Locke.

In 1809 at the age of 21, Alexander emigrated to the United States with his mother and siblings from Scotland, to join his father Thomas, who had emigrated there in 1807. They sailed from Scotland on the Latonia on 3 August 1809 and landed in New York City on 29 September, then traveled overland to Philadelphia. They continued to western Pennsylvania, where the senior Campbell was serving as a minister in Washington County on the frontier. Alexander was ordained by his father's Brush Run Church on 1 January 1812.

== Marriage and personal life ==
The year before, Campbell had married Margaret Brown on 12 March 1811. Margaret's father John Brown owned a significant amount of land in the Bethany, Virginia, area (now in West Virginia). The couple resided in what is now known as the Alexander Campbell Mansion near Bethany, and had eight children. Their first child, a daughter, was born on 13 March 1812.

His daughter's birth spurred Campbell to study the subject of baptism. He ultimately concluded that scripture did not support the baptism of infants. He came to believe that individuals had to choose conversion for themselves and baptism was not appropriate until they did so.

After the death of Margaret in 1827, Campbell married again the next year, to Selina Huntington Bakewell on 31 July 1828; they had six children.

== Public life ==
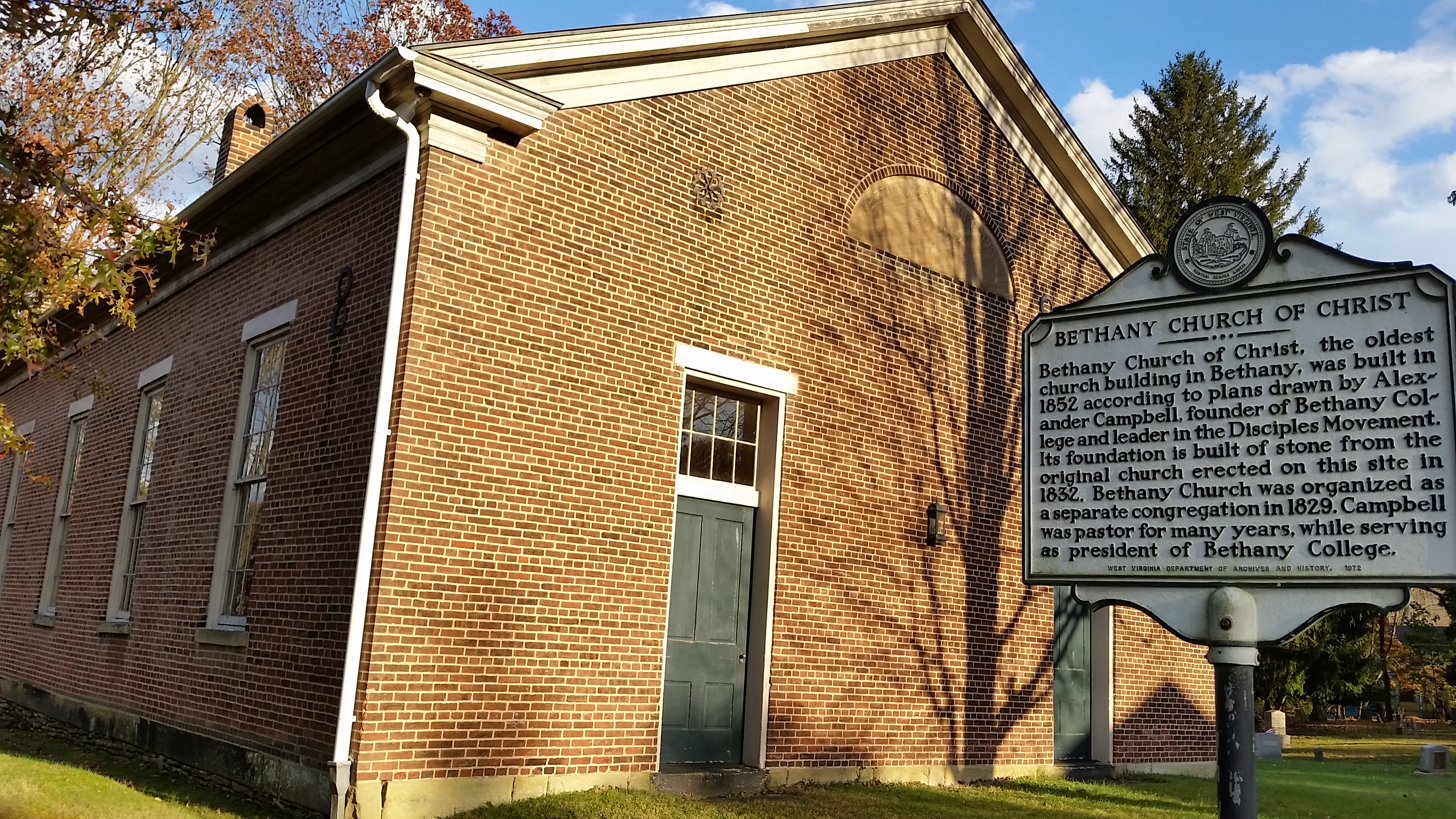
Old Bethany Church with Historical Marker

From 1815 to 1824, Campbell and his father kept the Brush Run Church affiliated with a local Baptist association. After disagreements over some issues, they allied with the Mahoning Baptist Association.

Campbell's only formal political service was as a delegate to the Virginia Constitutional Convention of 1829–1830, held in Richmond. He met some of the leading politicians of the day and was invited to preach in several churches in the capital city.

In 1840, Campbell founded Bethany College in Bethany, Virginia (now West Virginia). He believed that the clergy should be college educated. Many future leaders of the Disciples of Christ and Churches of Christ graduated from the college, although some latter congregations did not attach the same value to theological study and professional clergy.

Campbell visited the United Kingdom in 1847. During the trip he gave public lectures in England and Scotland. He went to Ireland to deliver funds that U.S. Restoration Movement churches had raised for relief in the Great Famine. While at Glasgow, he was challenged by James Robertson to a debate on the subject of slavery, which the American South protected and Campbell defended as moral. As a result of the fierce exchange, Robertson sued Campbell for libel. The American denied the charge, but he was arrested and imprisoned for ten days. Campbell was released when the warrant for his arrest was declared to be illegal. The case was ultimately tried, and the jury decided in his favor.

== Writings and works ==
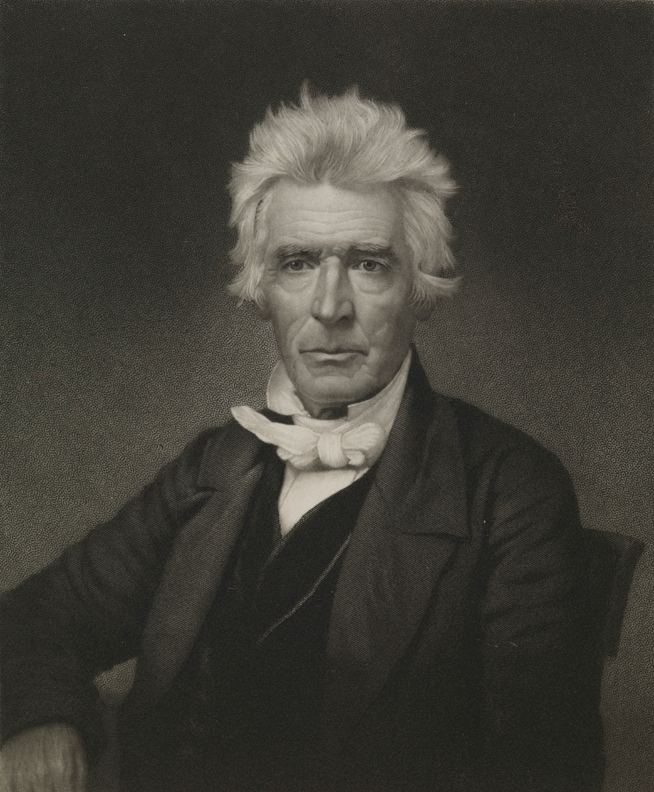
Alexander Campbell

While in his early 20s, Campbell wrote several moral essays under the pseudonym "Clarinda". and published them in a local paper. In 1820, his debate with the Presbyterian John Walker was published, reminding him of the efficacy of writing and publishing. He bought a press and built a small print shop in 1823, establishing what proved to be a successful publishing operation.

Campbell edited and published two journals. The first was the Christian Baptist, which he edited from 1823 through 1830. The second was The Millennial Harbinger, which he began in 1830 and continued to edit until his death in 1866. He became less active in it during the 1850s. In both, he advocated the reform of Christianity along the lines as it was practiced on the American frontier. He encouraged contributions by writers who thought differently from him, and the journals encouraged a lively dialogue about issues in the reform movement.

Campbell expanded his printing operation in 1830 for the Millennial Harbinger. The change from the Christian Baptist to the Harbinger was prompted by several concerns. Differences of opinion were arising between Campbell and the Baptists, and in many cases Baptist associations were expelling persons connected with the Campbell movement. He was concerned that "Christian Baptist" – which he considered to be less appropriate than the biblical term "Disciples" – was becoming the de facto name of the group. He also wanted the new journal to have a more positive tone, promoting reform and preparing the world for the millennium and the second coming of Christ.

Campbell wrote several books, including The Christian System. He also wrote hymns, including "Upon the Banks of Jordan Stood". Campbell compiled and published a translation of the New Testament under the title The Living Oracles. Published in 1826, it was based on an 1818 translation by George Campbell, James MacKnight and Philip Doddridge, and included edits and extensive notes by Campbell.

His known works include:

- The Living Oracles (1826) – Campbell's translation of the New Testament
- Psalms, Hymns and Spiritual Songs (1828)
- Prospectus of the Millennial Harbinger (1829)
- Delusions: An Analysis of the Book of Mormon (1832)
- The Christian Preacher's Companion (1836)
- The Christian System (1839) – summary of Campbell's theology
- The Christian Hymnbook (1843)
- A Tract for the People of Kentucky (1849)
- Christian Baptism—Its Antecedents and Consequents (1851)
- The Acts of the Apostles (1858) – Campbell's translation
- Memoirs of Elder Thomas Campbell (1861)
- Popular Lectures and Addresses (1863)
- Familiar Lectures on the Pentateuch (1867)

== Public debates ==
For a time, Campbell was wary of public debates. In June 1820, he debated with Rev. John Walker, a Baptist preacher, at Mount Pleasant, Ohio, on baptism, and since then, regularly participated in debates. Some of them gained national and international attention after their transcripts were published. In 1823, he debated with Rev. William L. McCalla, a Presbyterian minister, on infant baptism; in April 1829, with Robert Owen on socialism and Christianity; in January 1837, with Archbishop of Cincinnati, John Baptist Purcell on Protestantism and Roman Catholicism; in September 1843, he defended the Restoration Movement in a debate with Rev. Nathan L. Rice, who represented traditional Presbyterianism.

== Death, legacy, and honors ==
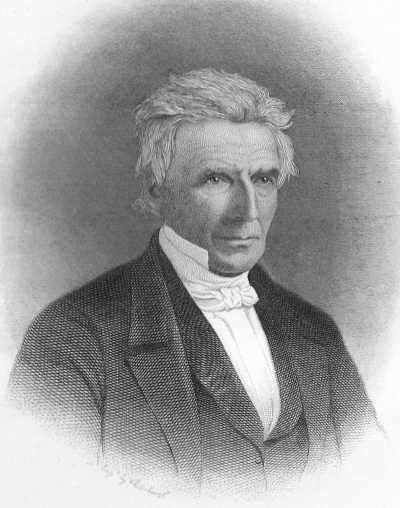
Alexander Campbell, age 65

Alexander Campbell died at the age of 77 on 4 March 1866 at Bethany, West Virginia. His widow died more than three decades later, on 28 June 1897. His nephew Archibald Campbell (1833–1899) had already become an important abolitionist and Republican party leader, and as editor of the Wheeling Daily Intelligencer helped found what became the state of West Virginia.

- Campbell was instrumental in the Restoration Movement, which resulted in a new direction for American Christians and founding of numerous new, non-denominational churches as well as the Christian Church (Disciples of Christ).
- His house in Bethany, West Virginia, the Alexander Campbell Mansion, was designated as a National Historic Landmark.
- The Alexander Campbell Auditorium at Culver–Stockton College is named in his honor.
- Campbell is known to have preached at the Slash Church, now on the National Register of Historic Places in rural Hanover County, Virginia and still used by a Disciples of Christ congregation.

== See also ==
- José María Jesús Carbajal, spiritually mentored by Campbell
- Old Bethany Church
