= ICC =

ICC or icc commonly refers to:

- International Criminal Court, an intergovernmental organization and international tribunal seated in The Hague, Netherlands
- International Cricket Council, the global governing body of cricket

ICC or icc may also refer to:

== Buildings ==
- Iloilo Convention Center, a convention center in Iloilo City
- International Commerce Centre, a skyscraper in Hong Kong
- International Commercial Center, a skyscraper in Ulaanbaatar, Mongolia
- International Convention Centre (disambiguation), any of several convention centers
- Internationales Congress Centrum Berlin, Germany
- Edward B. Bunn S.J. Intercultural Center, on the campus of Georgetown University, US
- International Convention Centre, Birmingham, a conference centre in Birmingham, UK

== Games ==
- Interstellar Confederation of Corporations, in the MMORPG Anarchy Online
- International Cricket Captain (series), a video game series about cricket management
- Internet Chess Club, a website for playing chess
- Icecrown Citadel, in the MMORPG World of Warcraft: Wrath of the Lich King

== Judicial courts ==
- Illinois Commerce Commission, a quasi-judicial tribunal which regulates public utility services in the U.S. state of Illinois
- International Criminal Court, an intergovernmental organization and international tribunal seated in The Hague, Netherlands

== Organizations ==
=== Government ===
- Interstate Commerce Commission, a now-defunct U.S. government regulatory body
- International Control Commission, which oversaw the 1954 Geneva Accords ending the First Indochina War
- International communication centers, Chinese state media institutions
- International Computing Centre, based in Geneva, Switzerland, established by the UN in 1971
- International Computation Centre, in Rome, Italy, created by UNESCO in 1951, now the Intergovernmental Bureau for Informatics
- International Certificate for Operators of Pleasure Craft, informally known as the International Certificate of Competence, an international certificate of boating competence established under UNECE resolutions
- International Chancery Center, a diplomatic enclave in Washington DC housing a number of chanceries of foreign missions
- Isthmian Canal Commission, a body set up to administer the Panama Canal Zone

=== Politics ===
- International Communist Current, a communist organization
- Inuit Circumpolar Council, a non-governmental organization representing several peoples in the far north
- International Coordinating Committee of National Human Rights Institutions
- Israel on Campus Coalition, a pro-Israel activist organization in the US

=== Religion ===
- International Christian Concern, a human rights organization
- International Christian Church, a group of Stone-Campbell Restoration churches led by Kip McKean and split off from the ICOC
- International Churches of Christ, a group of Stone-Campbell Restoration Movement Christian churches
- International Critical Commentary, an academic level biblical commentary series
- Irish Council of Churches, an ecumenical Christian body

=== Sports ===
- International Champions Cup, friendly association football tournament of mostly European clubs
- International Co-ordination Committee of World Sports Organizations for the Disabled, 1982–1989 predecessor of the International Paralympic Committee
- International Cricket Council, the global governing body of cricket
- Illinois College Conference, a defunct American collegiate athletic conference
- Indiana Collegiate Conference, a defunct American collegiate athletic conference

=== Business ===
- Industrial Credit Company, (later Industrial Credit Corporation) purchased by the Halifax
- Information Control Company, an information technology consulting firm headquartered in Columbus, Ohio
- Innovation Collaboration Centre, a startup incubator in Adelaide, South Australia
- Innovative Communications Corporation, a telecommunications company in the US Virgin Islands
- International Chamber of Commerce, supporting global trade and globalisation
- International Code Council, US-based building codes organisation
- International Controls Corporation, an American holding company founded by Robert Vesco
- International Culinary Center, a cooking school with several locations

=== Other organizations ===
- Imperial Camel Corps, an historic British Commonwealth military unit
- Incarnation Children's Center, a New York orphanage, specializing in care of children with HIV/AIDS
- Indian Cinematograph Committee, an Indian government committee overseeing censorship and cinema
- Inter-Cooperative Council at the University of Michigan, a student housing cooperative in Ann Arbor, Michigan
- International Association for Cereal Science and Technology, formerly International Association for Cereal Chemistry
- International Camp on Communication and Computers, European organisation for blind and partially sighted students
- International Centre for Choreography, based at the Australian Dance Theatre in Adelaide, South Australia
- International Code Council, a US-based organization that publishes the International Building Code
- International Color Consortium, a standards body for computer color management
- Institute for Computational Cosmology, an academic research institute at Durham University
- NTT InterCommunication Center, a media art gallery in Tokyo, Japan

== Science and technology ==
=== Biology and psychology ===
- Immunocytochemistry, interaction of chemicals with immune responses of cells
- Intercellular communication, in cell biology
- International consensus criteria, proposed diagnostic criteria for chronic fatigue syndrome (myalgic encephalomyelitis)
- Interstitial cell of Cajal, a type of interstitial cell found in the gastrointestinal tract
- Item characteristic curve, curves used in item response theory

=== Computing ===
- I_{CC}, the transistor collector current in an NPN bipolar junction transistor
- ICC profile, for characterising a color space or device
- Intel C++ Compiler, a group of C and C++ compilers from Intel
- Smart card, or integrated circuit card or integrated chip card
  - Integrated circuit card identifier (ICCID), the identifier of SIM card

=== Other uses in science and technology ===
- Infinite conjugacy class property, or ICC group in mathematics
- Information Coding Classification, a system for classification of literature or other information by knowledge domains
- International calling code, a prefix to call to a phone number from abroad
- Intraclass correlation or intraclass correlation coefficient

== Schools ==
=== United Kingdom ===
- Icknield Community College, a comprehensive school in Watlington, Oxfordshire
- Ifield Community College, a school in Crawley, West Sussex
- International Christian College, Glasgow, Scotland
- Ivybridge Community College, a secondary school in Ivybridge, Devon

=== United States ===
- Illinois Central College, main campus in East Peoria; two campuses in Peoria, one in Pekin, Illinois
- Independence Community College, a community college in Independence, Kansas
- Isothermal Community College, a community college in Spindale, North Carolina
- Itasca Community College, a community college in Grand Rapids, Minnesota
- Itawamba Community College, campuses in Fulton and Tupelo, Mississippi
- Izard County Consolidated High School, a high school and school district in Brockwell, Arkansas
- Dr. William M. Scholl College of Podiatric Medicine, formerly known as the Illinois College of Chiropody

== Events ==
- International Cartographic Conference, an academic conference of the International Cartographic Association
- International Conference on Communications, an academic conference for engineers
- International Conference on Creationism, a conference in support of young earth creationism
- International Coastal Cleanup, a worldwide day of trash cleanup activities founded by Ocean Conservancy staff member Linda Maraniss in 1986

== Other uses ==
- Independent component city, a legal class of cities in the Philippines
- Commerce Clause, also known as the Interstate Commerce Clause and Indian Commerce Clause, an enumerated power of the US Constitution
- Integration competency center, a shared service function within an organization for performing methodical data integration, system integration or enterprise application integration
- Maryland Route 200 or Intercounty Connector, a highway between the two Maryland suburban counties bordering Washington, DC, US
- International Certificate of Competence, a boating certificate
