= ICOC =

ICOC may refer to:

- International Churches of Christ, a global family/network of churches.
- International Code of Conduct against Ballistic Missile Proliferation, also known as the "Hague Code of Conduct"
- International Commission for Orders of Chivalry, a scholarly organization studying chivalric orders.
- International Code of Conduct for Private Security Service Providers

== See also ==
- ICC (disambiguation), listing many organizations whose names may also be abbreviated "ICOC"
