= International Center =

International Center or International Centre may refer to:

== Buildings ==
- International Centre, a convention centre in Toronto, Ontario, Canada
- International Center, Dallas, a neighborhood of high-rise buildings in Texas, US
- Honolulu International Center, the former name of the community center Neal S. Blaisdell Center, Hawaii, US
- International Centre, Goa, a conference centre in India

== Other uses ==
- International Center Station, a subway station in Japan

== See also ==
- International Convention Centre (disambiguation)
