= ICC members =

ICC members may refer to:

- List of International Cricket Council members
- States parties to the Rome Statute of the International Criminal Court

== See also ==
- ICC (disambiguation)
