= International Convention Centre =

International Convention Centre or International Convention Center may refer to:

== Africa ==
- Kenyatta International Convention Centre, Kenya
- Cape Town International Convention Centre, South Africa
- Durban International Convention Centre, South Africa

== Asia ==
- International Convention Center (Jerusalem)
- International Convention Center Jeju, South Korea
- Dubai International Convention Centre, UAE
- Suntec Singapore International Convention and Exhibition Centre
- Taipei International Convention Center, Taiwan
- ICC Tainan, Taiwan
- International Convention Center Kaohsiung, Taiwan
- Cebu International Convention Center, Philippines
- Philippine International Convention Center, Philippines
- International Convention Centre, Pune, India
- Hyderabad International Convention Centre, India
- Rajgir International Convention Centre, Rajgir, India
- India International Convention & Expo Centre – IICC, Delhi, India
- King Salman International Convention Center, Medina, Kingdom of Saudi Arabia

== Europe ==
- International Convention Centre, Birmingham, England
- International Convention Centre Wales, Newport, Wales
- Ukrainian House, officially known as the International Convention Center, in Kyiv, Ukraine

== North America ==
- Georgia International Convention Center, US
- Kentucky International Convention Center, US

== Oceania ==
- International Convention Centre Sydney, Australia
