= The Christian Chronicle =

- Type: Monthly newspaper
- Owner: The Christian Chronicle Inc.
- President: Erik Tryggestad
- Editor-in-chief: Bobby Ross Jr.
- Associate editor: Audrey Jackson
- Opinion editor: Jeremie Beller
- Founded: 1943
- Headquarters: Oklahoma Christian University; Oklahoma City, Oklahoma
- Circulation: 132,000 (as of 2024)
- OCLC number: 16538784
- Website: christianchronicle.org

The Christian Chronicle is an American religious newspaper associated with the Churches of Christ. The Chronicle has a "news not views" editorial policy.

== History ==
The Christian Chronicle was established in 1943, by journalist and Bible scholar Olan Hicks as a newspaper with the primary goal of providing information about Churches of Christ. Has been characterized as "one of the most important sources of primary historical information on the worldwide missions carried out by Churches of Christ." The paper was acquired by Sweet Publishing Company in the late 1960s. In 1981 the Chronicle was redesigned by Charlie Marler, a journalism professor from Abilene Christian University. It has been supported since 1981 by Oklahoma Christian University.

A survey conducted in the early 1990s found that 68 percent of ministers in the Churches of Christ read the Chronicle, and 88 percent of those readers said they agreed with the content. The Encyclopedia of the Stone-Campbell Movement describes the Chronicle as "by far the most-read paper in the Churches of Christ and [it] exercises an influence for cohesiveness in this part of the Stone-Campbell Movement". The Chronicle has a "news not views" editorial policy.

The newspaper's print edition was redesigned in April 2000 and again in May 2024. Following the second redsign, articles will be classified under the headers: Matter of Fact (top stories), National, International, Life Matters (includes opinion), Q&A interviews and reviews.
