= International Association for Cereal Science and Technology =

International scientific association

The International Association for Cereal Science and Technology (ICC) was founded in 1955 and was originally called the International Association for Cereal Chemistry. It was set up to develop international standard testing procedures for cereals and flour. It has currently more than fifty member countries and headquarters in Vienna, Austria. The ICC celebrated its 50th anniversary in 2005.

== History ==
The International Association for Cereal Science and Technology (ICC) was founded in 1955 in Hamburg, Germany, and was originally named the International Association for Cereal Chemistry. The founding took place at the third International Bread Congress. The impetus was to develop "internationally approved and accepted standard testing procedures for cereals and flour". Leading scientists involved in the establishment of the association included Dr. Friedrich Schweitzer (Austria), Dr. Fuchs and Dr. Paul F. Pelshenke (Germany), Dr. Hintzer (The Netherlands), Prof. Maes (Belgium), Prof. Buré (France), and Dr. Widhe (Sweden). The United States and Canada were represented by Dr. Shellenberger, Dr. Zeleny, and Dr. Andersen. Schweitzer was the first president of the ICC.

In 1978, the name of the association was changed to the International Association for Cereal Science and Technology, as members felt it better reflected the association's scope. The ICC celebrated its 50th anniversary in 2005. Its headquarters are in Vienna.

== Activities ==
The ICC holds an international congress, the Cereals and Bread Congress, as well as local meetings and symposia around the world. Friedrich Schweitzer organised the first international meeting of the association, which was held in Vienna on 5–8 December 1956, and a second ten years later, also in Vienna.

The ICC confers a number of awards and honours significant contributions with Fellow of the ICC Academy. The foremost medal is the Clyde H. Bailey Medal, which was initiated in 1969 and is awarded for "outstanding achievements in cereals science and technology". The Friedrich Schweitzer Medal, created in 1989, is awarded for distinguished service to the ICC.
