= Kip McKean =

American minister

Thomas McKean

Personal details
- Born: May 31, 1954 (age 72) Indianapolis, Indiana, United States
- Spouse: Elena Garcia-Bengochea
- Children: 3
- Education: University of Florida
- Website: www.kipmckean.com

Thomas Wayne "Kip" McKean II (born May 31, 1954) is an American minister. He was the founder of the International Churches of Christ and of the International Christian Church. He was former world missions evangelist of the International Christian Churches, also known as the "Portland/Sold-Out Discipling Movement".

== Personal life and education ==
McKean's father was a rear admiral in the US Navy. McKean has a brother and a sister. He is married and has three children.

Kip baptized his brother, Randy, in 1973. Randy then served as an Evangelist in the denomination Kip founded, the International Churches of Christ. He served as an Evangelist until his retirement.

McKean graduated from the University of Florida in 1975 with a degree in speech and communications. He later attended Eastern Baptist Theological Seminary, but left over disputes with university academics' biblical interpretation. He also faced criticism from other ministers for his own strict personal style. McKean also attended the Harding Graduate School of Religion for two years but never received a master's degree.

McKean's negative academic experience, combined with his success as an evangelist, convinced him that seminary education was not effective at training evangelists. Instead he developed a mentoring "discipleship" approach modeled on the Apostle Paul's mentoring of Timothy and Titus as well as McKean's own earlier mentoring by pastor Chuck Lucas who started the Crossroads Movement in Gainesville, Florida.

In 1976, McKean, with Roger Lamb, took the Campus Advance plan to Eastern Illinois University's campus ministry, as supported by the Memorial Drive Church of Christ in Houston, Texas. However, a year later, their financial support was terminated due to legalism and problems.

== Lexington Church of Christ ==
McKean moved to the Boston area in 1979 and began working in the Lexington Church of Christ. He asked them to "redefine their commitment to Christ," and introduced the use of discipling partners. The congregation grew rapidly, and was renamed the Boston Church of Christ.

== International Churches of Christ ==
In the mid-1980s, McKean became leader of both Boston and Crossroads Movements, eventually splitting from mainstream Churches of Christ, to become the International Church of Christ (ICOC).

The movement was first recognized as an independent religious group in 1992 when John Vaughn, a church growth specialist at Fuller Theological Seminary, listed them as a separate entity. Time magazine ran a full-page story on the movement in 1992 calling them "one of the world's fastest-growing and most innovative bands of Bible thumpers" that had grown into "a global empire of 103 congregations from California to Cairo with total Sunday attendance of 50,000", and which also raised concerns about authoritarian leadership, pressure placed on members, and whether the group should be considered a cult.

A formal break was made from the mainline Churches of Christ in 1993 when the movement organized under the name "International Churches of Christ." This new designation formalized a division that was already in existence between those involved with the Crossroads/Boston Movement and "mainline" Churches of Christ.

In 1990, the McKeans moved to Los Angeles to lead the Los Angeles International Church of Christ, where they presided through the 1990s.

=== Resignation from the International Churches of Christ ===
Beginning in the late 1990s, McKean's moral authority as the leader of the movement came into question. Expectations for continued numerical growth and the pressure to sacrifice financially to support missionary efforts took its toll. Added to this was the loss of local leaders to new planting projects. In some areas, decreases in membership began to occur. At the same time, the realization was growing that the accumulated cost of his leadership style and associated advantages were outweighing the benefits. In 2001, McKean was asked by a group of long-standing elders in the ICOC to take a sabbatical from overall leadership of the ICOC. On 12 November 2001, McKean wrote that he had decided to take a sabbatical from his role as the leader of the International Churches of Christ. He issued the following statement:

During these days Elena and I have been coming to grips with the need to address some serious shortcomings in our marriage and family. After much counsel with the Gempels and Bairds and other World Sector Leaders as well as hours of prayer, we have decided it is God's will for us to take a sabbatical and to delegate, for a time, our day-to-day ministry responsibilities so that we can focus on our marriage and family.

One year later, In November 2002, McKean announced his resignations from his roles as World Missions Evangelist and head of the world sector leaders. He cited ongoing family problems, apologized for his own arrogance and said that his sins "have weakened and embittered many in our churches", and "these sins have surfaced in my family as well as the church." A year earlier one of his children had left the church. Referring to this event, McKean said: "This, along with my leadership sins of arrogance, and not protecting the weak caused uncertainty in my leadership among some of the World Sector Leaders." Additionally, his over emphasis on numerical goals, not seeking discipling in his own life and claiming God's victories as his own, were cited by McKean as the reasons for his resignation.

His resignation was acknowledged by a letter from the elders the following day.

After a period leading an ICOC congregation in Portland, Oregon, he started a new church separated from the ICOC. This movement was named the International Christian Church by him. The period following McKean's resignation from leadership and departure was followed by a number of changes in the ICOC.

== International Christian Church ==
On 15 October 2006, McKean published in the Portland church bulletin the first of a three-part series entitled, "Partners in the Gospel." Though the names "Portland Movement" and "Sold-Out Discipling Movement" had been used for over a year, these three articles were the first formal announcement of the birth of the International Christian Church. It was only after this October 2006 date that any church affiliated with the Portland Church changed their name to ICC.

Since 2006, the congregations under McKean's leadership have been called the International Christian Church.

In April 2007, McKean and his wife Elena left the Portland International Christian Church to plant the City of Angels International Christian Church in Los Angeles. McKean and his wife were accompanied by 40 other leaders from the Portland ICC.

In 2008, McKean began the benevolent arm of the movement: Mercy WorldWide.

In 2012, the founding of the International College of Christian Ministries (ICCM) occurred. "Bachelor’s, Master’s and Doctorate Degrees are granted according to the SoldOut Movement’s convictions."

In late 2022 and early 2023, McKean was named as a defendant in several federal lawsuits alleging that the International Churches of Christ and the International Christian Church "covered up sexual abuse of children as young as three years old and financially exploited church members". The federal lawsuits were withdrawn by the plaintiffs in July 2023.

The Dublin International Christian Church became active in 2023 and began recruiting students from the city's universities. They preached anti-abortion and anti-LGBT messages on social media. In 2025, University College Dublin warned students about the ICC and wrote a letter to them requesting that they stop attempting to recruit students on campus.

A BBC investigation in 2026 found that the London and Edinburgh ICC pressured members into donating funds and asked to view their bank statements. Members were also advised to cut off relationships with friends and family outside the church.

== See also ==
- Churches of Christ
- Restoration Movement
