= International Convention Centre, Pune =

Building in India

Coordinates: 18.5661036°N 73.9153581°E

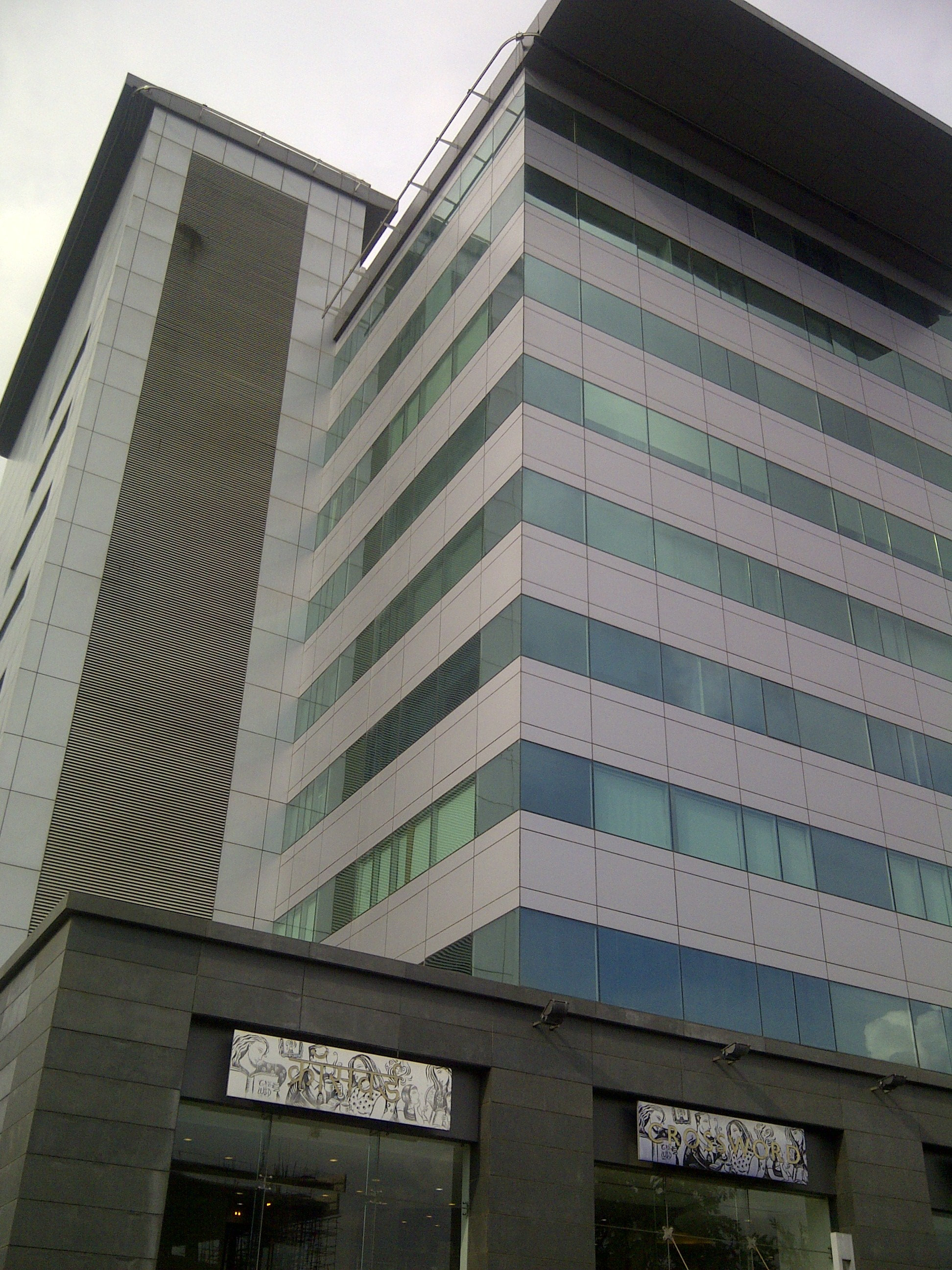
ICC Trade Centre

International Conventional Centre, Pune (locally known as ICC Trade Towers) is the largest composite trade and convention centre in South Asia, located on Senapati Bapat Road (S. B. Road) in Pune, Maharashtra, India. International Convention Centre complex includes the ICC Trade Tower, ICC Tech Park and Pune Marriott Hotel and Convention Centre.

The Trade Tower has a built-up area of 480,000 sq ft and is used for office purposes. The Marriott Hotel and Convention Centre has 418 rooms. The S. L. Kirloskar Convention Centre, located within the Pune Marriott Hotel and Convention Centre, measures 40,000 sq ft and is used for meetings and exhibitions, with a seating capacity of up to 1,800 people. The ICC Mall measures about 665,500 sq. ft. and consist of mall, office space, multiplex and family entertainment facilities.

== Buildings inside ICC ==
=== ICC Trade Tower ===
The tower is registered as Software Technology Park of India. It comprises office blocks, showrooms and multi-level parking with two basements which can accommodate more than 500 cars. The total area is 475,000 sq. ft. and floor plate with 60,000 sq. ft.

=== ICC Tech Park ===
This has two office blocks with 150,000 sq. ft. and 170,000 sq. ft. respectively. Each office has 21,000 sq. ft. floor plate. LTIMindtree is the main tenant in the Tower.

=== Pune Marriott Hotel and Convention Centre ===
This consist of open air exhibition ground, an art gallery, function rooms and auditoriums. This has 418 rooms and 40,000 sq. ft. meeting and exhibition space to accommodate 1800 people. There are 12 meeting rooms which accommodate 1800 people. The ICC Mall is located in this building.
