= International Churches of Christ =

Group of Stone-Campbell Restoration Movement Christian churches

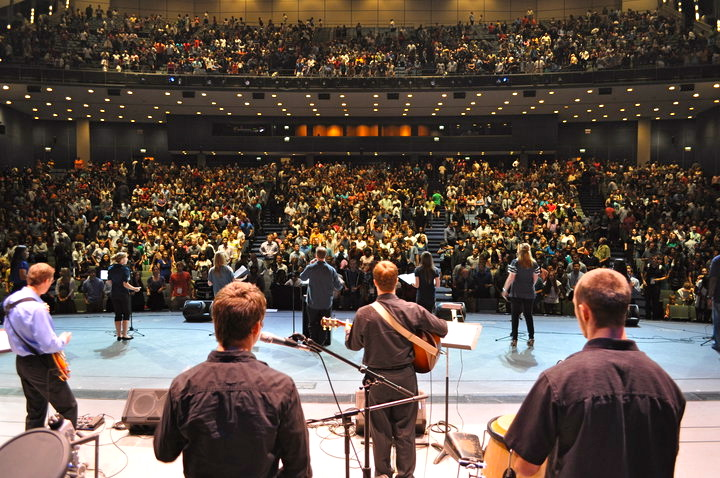
- An International Church of Christ worship service
- Classification: Protestant
- Orientation: Restorationist
- Polity: Congregationalist
- Associations: HOPE Worldwide; Disciples Today; IPI Books
- Region: Global (144 nations)
- Official website: International Churches of Christ

The International Churches of Christ (ICOC) is a decentralized fellowship of cooperating, religiously conservative, and racially integrated Christian congregations. With its origins in the Stone-Campbell Restoration Movement, the ICOC emerged from the discipling movement within the Churches of Christ during the 1970s. Under the leadership of Kip McKean, a key figure until 2003, the church expanded from its beginnings in Gainesville to Boston, becoming one of the fastest-growing Christian movements by focusing heavily on US college campuses. While experiencing rapid growth, McKean's leadership also attracted criticism. As of March 2024, the ICOC reported a membership of 112,000.

The ICOC operates under a cooperative leadership structure divided into regional families, each with its own representative delegates. The church views the Bible as its sole authority and emphasizes its identity as a non-denominational body united under Christ. Its doctrines advocate for salvation through faith and baptism, rejecting the concept of "faith alone," while stressing global unity. Historically, the ICOC practiced exclusive baptism and strict "discipling." However, since 2002, it has shifted toward a more decentralized and voluntary approach to discipleship. The church promotes racial integration, opposes abortion and recreational drug use, and supports international service efforts through HOPE Worldwide.

According to David V. Barrett in 2001, the ICOC faced significant criticism from the anti-cult movement throughout the 1990s. A major point of contention was the church's discipling system under Kip McKean, which some former members claimed humiliated vulnerable individuals. The ICOC was also criticized for "love bombing"—a tactic of showering new recruits with affection that later turned conditional, which was seen as preying on the lonely and vulnerable. These practices led to the church being barred from recruiting or gaining student organization status on many university campuses.

More recently, the ICOC was implicated in 2022 US federal lawsuits alleging that its leaders covered up child sexual abuse and financially exploited members from 1987 to 2012. Although the plaintiffs voluntarily dismissed these federal cases in July 2023, they subsequently filed similar lawsuits in the Superior Court in Los Angeles, California.

== History ==
=== Origins in the Stone-Campbell Movement ===
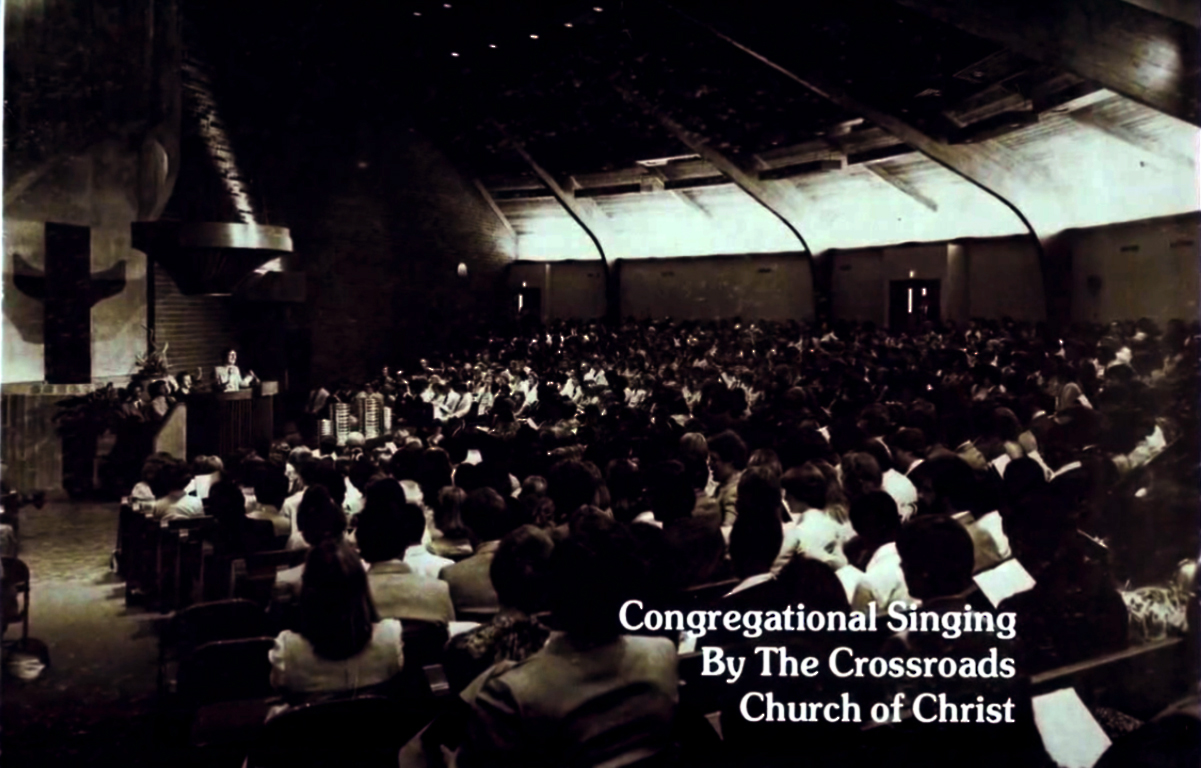
Crossroads Church of Christ in 1970s.

The ICOC has its roots in a movement that dates back to the Second Great Awakening (1790–1870) in early nineteenth-century America. Barton W. Stone and Alexander Campbell are credited with founding what is now known as the Stone-Campbell or Restoration Movement. The Restoration Movement itself has several branches, and the ICOC was formed from within one of them, the Churches of Christ. Specifically, the ICOC originated from a discipling movement that emerged among the Churches of Christ in the 1970s. This discipling movement began within the campus ministry of Chuck Lucas.

In 1967, Chuck Lucas was the minister of the 14th Street Church of Christ in Gainesville, Florida (which was later renamed the Crossroads Church of Christ). That year, he initiated a new project called Campus Advance, which was based on principles borrowed from the Campus Crusade and the Shepherding Movement. Centered on the University of Florida, the program emphasized strong evangelical outreach and an intimate religious atmosphere through "soul talks" and "prayer partners." Soul talks were meetings held in student residences that involved prayer and sharing; these groups were overseen by a leader who delegated authority over the members. The term "prayer partners" referred to the practice of pairing a new convert with a more experienced guide for personal assistance and direction. Together, these practices led to what was described as the "in-depth involvement of each member in one another's lives".

The ministry grew as its younger members appreciated the new emphasis on commitment and the models for communal activity. This activity was associated by many with the broader forces of radical change characterizing American society in the late 1960s and 1970s. The campus ministry in Gainesville thrived and maintained strong support from the elders of the local congregation, the Crossroads Church of Christ. By 1971, the church was adding as many as a hundred new members per year. A particularly significant development was the creation of a training program for potential campus ministers.

=== From Gainesville to Boston: 1970s–1980s ===
Among the converts in Gainesville was Kip McKean, a student who was baptized by Chuck Lucas. McKean was introduced to the Florida Church of Christ’s controversial recruitment methods in 1967. Born in Indianapolis, McKean completed a degree while training at Crossroads, after which he served as the campus minister at several Churches of Christ locations. By 1979, his ministry had grown from just a few individuals to over 300 members, making it the fastest-growing Church of Christ campus ministry in the United States.

McKean then moved to Massachusetts, where he assumed leadership of the Lexington Church of Christ, which would later be renamed the Boston Church of Christ. Building on Lucas’ initial strategies, McKean agreed to lead the Lexington church only under the condition that every member would be 'totally committed'. Under his leadership, the church grew from 30 members to 3,000 in just over a decade, a period known as the 'Boston Movement'. McKean taught that the church represented "God's true and only modern movement". Under his direction, the church established a tightly structured community that sought to replicate the doctrines and lifestyle of first-century Christian churches, with the goal of evangelizing the world within a generation. According to journalist Madeleine Bower, “The group became known for its extreme views and rigid teaching of the Bible, but mainstream churches quickly disavowed the group”.

Sociologist David G. Bromley and religious historian J. Gordon Melton note that while the International Churches of Christ (ICOC) experienced rapid growth in the 1980s, its relationships with several established religious institutions deteriorated. The church’s doctrine emphasized its perceived superiority over other Christian groups, teaching that it alone had rediscovered essential biblical doctrines for individual salvation. It also insisted on rebaptizing new members to ensure their salvation. Bromley and Melton also point out that tensions increased due to the ICOC’s “aggressive evangelizing tactics” and its practice of 'discipling' or 'shepherding', in which new members received spiritual guidance and their personal lives were closely monitored by more established members. “Members were taught that commitment to the church superseded all other relationships”, they write. As a result, “the main branch of the Churches of Christ disavowed its relationship with ICOC; a number of universities banned ICOC recruiters; and ICOC became a prominent target of media and anticult group opposition”.

In 1985, Dr. Flavil Yeakley, a Church of Christ minister and professor, administered the Myers-Briggs Type Indicator (MBTI) test to members of the Boston Church of Christ (BCC), the founding church of the ICOC. Yeakley distributed three MBTI tests, which asked members to evaluate their past, present, and future personality types. Of the over 900 members tested, 835 completed all three forms. The results revealed that a majority of respondents adjusted their perceived or imagined personality scores to align with a single type. After analyzing the data, Yeakley concluded, "The data in this study of the Boston Church of Christ does not prove that any certain individual has actually changed his or her personality in an unhealthy way. The data, however, does prove that there is a group dynamic operating in that congregation that influences its members to change their personalities to conform to the group norm".

By the end of 1988, the churches associated with the Boston Movement had effectively become a distinct fellowship, marking the beginning of a fifteen-year period with little interaction between the Churches of Christ and the Boston Movement. By that time, McKean had become the recognized leader of the movement. During this period, the Boston church launched Hope Worldwide, a program focused on outreach to the poor. In 1988, McKean selected a group of couples whom he and his wife, Elena, had personally trained, naming them World Sector Leaders. In 1989, mission teams were sent to cities including Tokyo, Honolulu, Washington, DC, Manila, Miami, Seattle, Bangkok, and Los Angeles. That year, McKean and his family relocated to Los Angeles to lead a new church that had been “planted” (a term the church uses to mean “established”) there months earlier. Within a few years, Los Angeles, not Boston, became the central hub of the movement.

=== The ICOC: 1990s ===
In 1990 the Crossroads Church of Christ broke with the movement and, through a letter written to The Christian Chronicle, attempted to restore relations with the Churches of Christ. By the early 1990s some first-generation leaders had become disillusioned by the movement and left. The movement was first recognized as an independent religious group in 1992 when John Vaughn, a church growth specialist at Fuller Theological Seminary, listed them as a separate entity. TIME magazine ran a full-page story on the movement in 1992 calling them "one of the world's fastest-growing and most innovative bands of Bible thumpers" that had grown into "a global empire of 103 congregations from California to Cairo with total Sunday attendance of 50,000". A formal break was made from the Churches of Christ in 1993 when the group organized under the name "International Churches of Christ." This new designation formalized a division that was already in existence between those involved with the Crossroads/Boston Movement and "original" Churches of Christ. In September 1995, the Washington Post reported that for every three members joining the church, two left, attributing this statistic to church officials.

Growth in the ICOC was not without criticism. Other names that have been used for this movement include the "Crossroads movement," "Multiplying Ministries," and the "Discipling Movement". One Church is formed per city, and as it expands it is broken down into "sectors" that oversee "zones" which have their own neighborhood Bible study groups. Claims that this structure too authoritarian were responded to by McKean saying, "I was wrong on some of my initial thoughts about biblical authority". Al Baird, former ICOC spokesperson adds, "It's not a dictatorship,"; "It's a theocracy, with God on top". The Pittsburgh Post-Gazette reported in 1996 that "The group is considered so aggressive and authoritarian in its practices that other evangelical Protestant groups have labeled it 'aberrational' and 'abusive'. It has been repudiated by the mainstream Churches of Christ, a 1.6 million-member body from which it grew".

Growth continued globally and in 1996 the independent organisation "Church Growth Today" named the Los Angeles ICOC as the fastest growing Church in North America for the second year running and another eight ICOC churches were in the top 100. By 1999, the Los Angeles church reached a Sunday attendance of 14,000. By 2001, the ICOC was an independent worldwide movement that had grown from a small congregation to 125,000 members and had planted a church in nearly every country of the world in a period of twenty years. In his 2001 book The New Believers: A Survey of Sects, 'Cults' and Alternative Religions, David V. Barrett wrote that the ICOC was "currently causing perhaps more concern than almost any other" evangelical church in the United Kingdom. Barrett writes that "In the last decade ICOC has attracted a huge amount of criticism and hostility from anti-cultists", noting that it had been made aware of various criticisms "but unlike some of the other movements founded in the 1970s, does not yet have appeared to reached the point in its development where it becomes sensitive to the genuine distress of some of its members and their families have experienced, and willing to modify some of its practices to reduce the possibility of causing such distress". In 1998, Ron Loomis, an expert on cults and leader of a cult-awareness program at the College of Lake County, called the ICOC "the most intensive cult in existence since the mid-1970s".

Barrett also noted in 2001 that as with other new religious movements, membership turnover in the ICOC was high, with "many leaving after a few months because they find the discipline of life in the movement too demanding or oppressive". He concluded that "There are probably far more ex-members of ICOC than current members", though noted ICOC attempts to discourage members from leaving and that communal living arrangements and the fact that the ICOC encouraged the breaking-off of friendships with non-members made it difficult for some to leave.

=== The ICOC: 2000s ===
Membership growth stopped as the 90's finished. In 2000, the ICOC announced the completion of its six-year initiative to establish a church in every country with a city that had a population over 100,000. In spite of this, numerical growth continued to slow. Beginning in the late 1990s, problems arose as McKean's moral authority as the leader of the movement came into question. Expectations for continued numerical growth and the pressure to sacrifice financially to support missionary efforts took its toll. Added to this was the loss of local leaders to new planting projects. In some areas, decreases in membership began to occur. At the same time, realization was growing that the accumulated costs of McKean's leadership style and associated disadvantages were outweighing the benefits. In 2001, McKean's leadership weaknesses were affecting his family, with all of his children disassociating themselves from the church, and he was asked by a group of long-standing elders in the ICOC to take a sabbatical from overall leadership of the ICOC. On November 12, 2001, McKean, who had led the International Churches of Christ, issued a statement that he was going to take a sabbatical from his role of leadership in the church:

During these days Elena and I have been coming to grips with the need to address some serious shortcomings in our marriage and family. After much counsel with the Gempels and Bairds and other World Sector Leaders as well as hours of prayer, we have decided it is God's will for us to take a sabbatical and to delegate, for a time, our day-to-day ministry responsibilities so that we can focus on our marriage and family.

Nearly a year later, in November 2002 he resigned from the office and personally apologized citing arrogance, anger and an over-focus on numerical goals as the source of his decision.

Referring to this event, McKean said:

This, along with my leadership sins of arrogance, and not protecting the weak caused uncertainty in my leadership.

Ronald Enroth writes that McKean "was forced to step down because of his own rule that leaders must resign if their children leave the church".

The period following McKean's departure included a number of changes in the ICOC, including decentralization and a dismantling of its headquarters and central leadership. Some changes were initiated from the leaders themselves and others brought through members. Most notable was Henry Kriete, a leader in the London ICOC, who circulated an open letter detailing his feelings about theological exclusivism and authority in the ICOC. This letter affected the ICOC for the decade after McKean's resignation. Christianity Today reported in 2003 that following McKean's resignation, "leadership now is in the hands of 10 elders ruling by consensus".

Critics of the ICOC claim that Kip McKean's resignation sparked numerous problems. However, others have noted that since McKean's resignation the ICOC has made numerous changes. The Christian Chronicle, a newspaper for the Churches of Christ, reports that the ICOC has changed its leadership and discipling structure. According to the paper, "the ICOC has attempted to address the following concerns: a top down hierarchy, discipling techniques, and sectarianism". In September 2005, nine members were elected to serve as a Unity Proposal Group. They subsequently developed a 'Plan for United Cooperation', published in March 2006. In September 2012, it was reported that around 93% of ICOC churches supported the plan.

Over time, McKean attempted to re-assert his leadership over the ICOC, yet was rebuffed. Sixty-four Elders, Evangelists and Teachers wrote a letter to McKean expressing concern that there had been "no repentance" from his publicly acknowledged leadership weaknesses. McKean then began to criticize some of the changes that were being made, as he did in the 1980s toward Mainline Churches of Christ. After attempting to divide the ICOC he was disfellowshipped in 2006 and founded a church that he called the International Christian Church.

The Christian Chronicle reports that the ICOC's reported membership peaked at 135,000 in 2002, before dropping to 89,000 in 2006. ICOC leaders reported that a mid-2012 survey revealed that membership had grown again to 97,800 members in 610 churches across 148 countries.

=== Legal issues ===
==== Lawsuit by an ICOC member church alleging defamation ====
On November 23, 1991, two Singapore Newspapers, The New Paper (English) and Lianhe Wanbao (Chinese), published articles stating that the Singapore Central Christian Church (a member of ICOC) was a "cult". The church sued the papers, alleging defamation. An initial court ruling held that what the papers had written was fair and in the public interest. An appeals court, however, overruled the lower court, stating that the papers had stated that the church was a cult as if that was a fact, when it was not a fact, but a comment. The papers were each ordered to pay the church S$20,000. The New Paper had to pay the founder of the church, John Philip Louis, S$30,000. The papers also had to pay the legal fees of the church and its founder. In the same ruling, the appeals court held that an article that had also characterized the church as a cult, in the bi-monthly, Singapore-based, Christian magazine Impact, was written fairly from the standpoint of a Christian publication written for the Christian community. The church and Louis were ordered to pay Impact's legal fees.

==== Lawsuits related to alleged coverup of sexual abuse ====
In 2022, the ICOC and the International Christian Churches were named in multiple US federal lawsuits. They alleged that between 1987 and 2012, leaders of the two churches covered up the sexual abuse of children, some of whom were as young as three, and financially exploited members. The lawsuits alleged that the ICOC, together with its affiliates the International Christian Church, the City of Angels International Christian Church, HOPE Worldwide and Mercy Worldwide, "indoctrinated" the plaintiffs, keeping them isolated while they were sexually exploited and manipulated through the ICOC's "rigid" belief system. The lawsuit also named ICOC leaders, founder Kip McKean and the estate of Chuck Lucas, as defendants. The plaintiffs alleged that the ICOC and its leaders created a "system of exploitation that extracts any and all value it can from members". The lawsuits alleged that members were forced to give 10% of their income as a tithe to the church and additionally to fund twice-yearly special mission trips, which drove some to depression and suicide. The Los Angeles ICOC responded to the lawsuits by stating: "As the Church's long-standing policies make clear, we do not tolerate any form of sexual abuse, sexual misconduct, or sexual coercion, and we will fully cooperate with the authorities in any investigations of this type of behavior". The federal lawsuits were voluntarily dismissed without prejudice at the request of the plaintiffs in July 2023. Similar lawsuits were then filed in the Superior Court in Los Angeles, California (i.e., State Court).

== Church governance ==
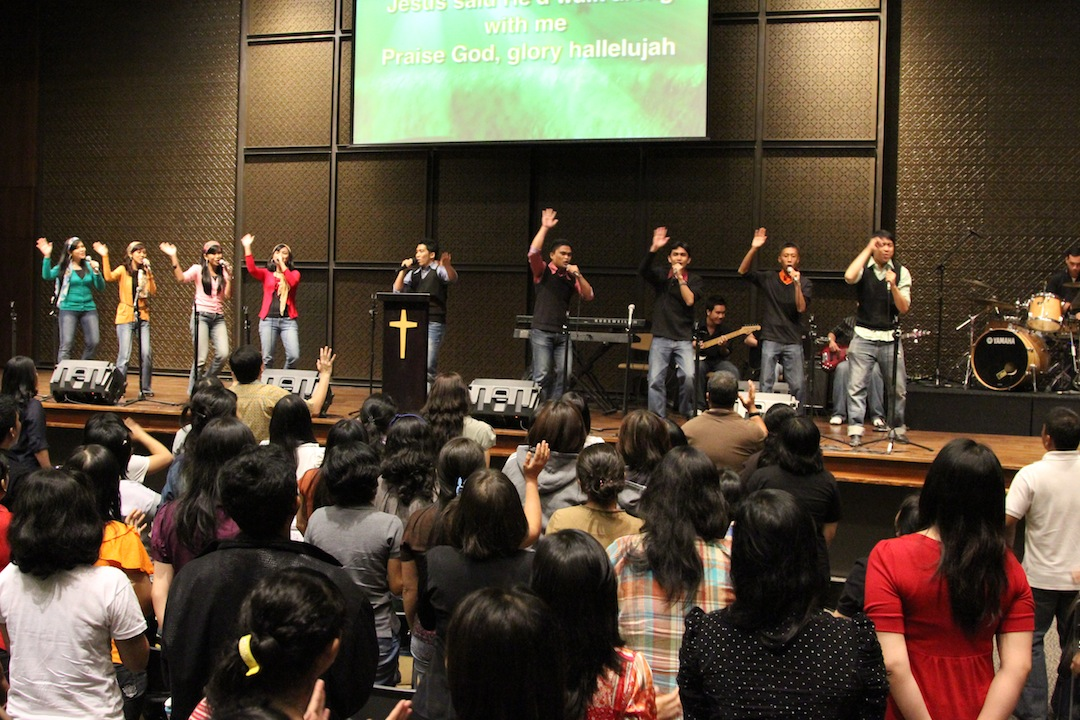
The 2000-member church in Jakarta, Indonesia

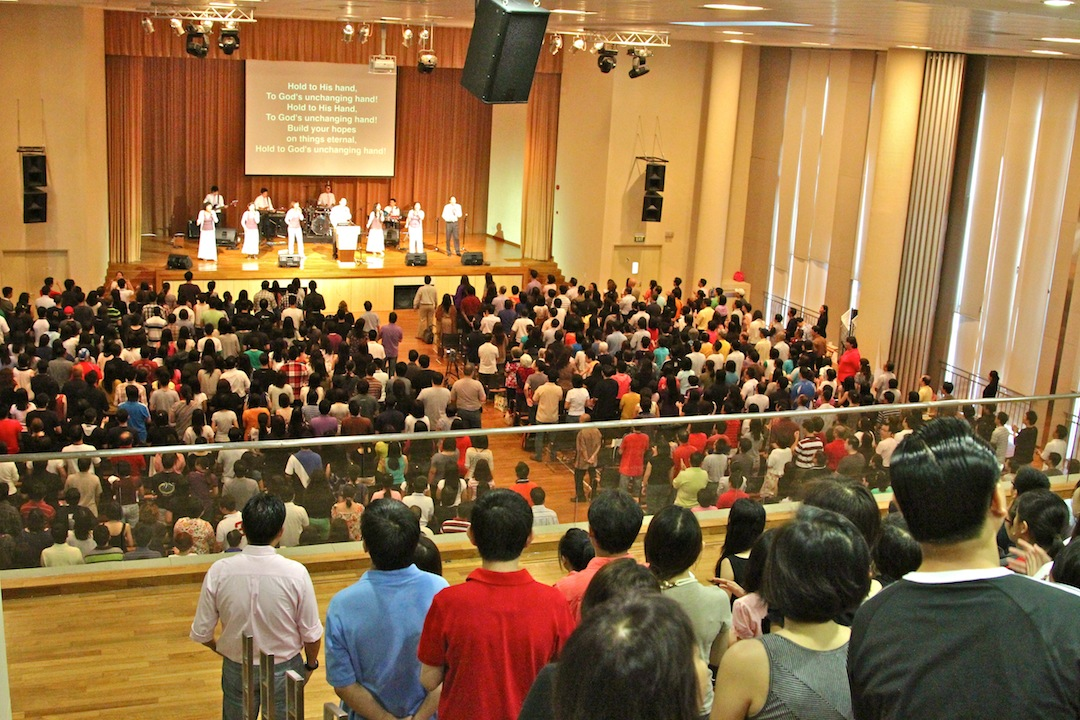
The Church in Singapore, which numbers over 1000 congregants

The International Churches of Christ are a family of over 750 independent churches in 155 nations around the world. The 750 churches form 34 Regional Families of churches that oversee mission work in their respective geographic areas of influence. Each regional family of churches sends Evangelists, Elders and Teachers to an annual leadership conference, where delegates meet to pray, plan and co-operate world evangelism. "Service Teams" provide global leadership and oversight. The Service Teams consists of an Elders, Evangelists, Teachers, Youth & Family, Campus, Singles, Communications & Administration, and HOPEww & Benevolence teams.

=== Ministry Training Academy ===
The education and ministerial training program in the ICOC is the Ministry Training Academy (MTA). In 2013, the MTA finalized a curriculum consisting of twelve core courses that are divided into three areas of study: biblical knowledge, spiritual development, and ministry leadership. Each course requires at least 12 hours of classroom study in addition to course work. An MTA student who completes the twelve core classes receives a certificate of completion.

=== ICOC's relationship with mainstream Churches of Christ ===
With the resignation of McKean, some efforts at healing between the International Churches of Christ and the mainstream Churches of Christ are being made. In March 2004, Abilene Christian University held the "Faithful Conversations" dialog between members of the Churches of Christ and International Churches of Christ. Those involved were able to apologize and initiate an environment conducive to building bridges. A few leaders of the Churches of Christ apologized for use of the word "cult" in reference to the International Churches of Christ. The International Churches of Christ leaders apologized for alienating the Churches of Christ and implying they were not Christians. Despite improvements in relations, there are still fundamental differences within the fellowship. Early 2005 saw a second set of dialogues with greater promise for both sides helping one another.

=== HOPE Worldwide ===
Founded in 1991, HOPE Worldwide is a non-profit organization established by the ICOC that supports disadvantaged children and the elderly. It relies on donations from ICOC churches, companies and individuals and on government grants. As of September 1997, HOPE Worldwide was operating 100 projects in 30 countries. As of 2023, the organization reported serving on average more than one million people per year, in more than 60 countries.

HOPE Worldwide received grants from US president George W. Bush's AIDS program for its work in several countries, and arranged for Chris Rock to visit South Africa for an AIDS prevention event.

== Beliefs and practices of the ICOC ==
=== Beliefs ===
The ICOC considers the Bible the inspired word of God. Through holding that their doctrine is based on the Bible alone, and not on creeds and traditions, they claim the distinction of being "non-denominational". Members of the International Churches of Christ generally emphasize their intent to simply be part of the original church established by Jesus Christ in his death, burial, and resurrection, which became evident on the Day of Pentecost as described in Acts 2. They believe that anyone who follows the plan of salvation as laid out in the scriptures is saved by the grace of God, through their faith in Jesus, at baptism. The ICOC has over 700 churches spread across 155 nations, with each church being a racially integrated congregation made up of a diversity of people from various age groups, economic, and social backgrounds. They believe Jesus came to break down the dividing wall of hostility between the races and people groups of this world and unite mankind under the Lordship of Christ

Like the Churches of Christ, the ICOC recognizes the Bible as the sole source of authority for the church and it also believes that the current denominational divisions are inconsistent with Christ's intent, believing instead that Christians ought to be united. The ICOC, like the Christian Church (Disciples of Christ), in contrast to the CoC, consider permissible practices that the New Testament does not expressly forbid.

The ICOC teaches that "anyone, anywhere who follows God's plan of salvation in the Bible and lives under the Lordship of Jesus, will be saved. Christians are saved by the grace of God, through their faith in Jesus Christ, at baptism." They claim that "faith alone" (e.g., saying the Sinner's Prayer) is not sufficient unless an individual by faith obeys God and gets baptized, believing that baptism is necessary for the forgiveness of sins. The belief in the necessity of baptism is in agreement with the prevailing view in the Churches of Christ and Restoration Movement. It is in contrast with the beliefs of Baptist churches that teach that faith alone is adequate for salvation.

==== One True Church (OTC) doctrine ====
Originally, the ICOC taught that only baptisms within ICOC member churches were legitimate and hence only members of ICOC churches had had their sins forgiven and were saved. This is known as the One True Church (OTC) doctrine.

In 2003, however, after the departure of McKean, the leadership of ICOC issued letters of apology stating that they had been "too judgmental" in applying this doctrine. As a consequence, many within ICOC began to accept that baptisms outside of ICOC churches, particularly those of family members who belonged to other Christian denominations, could be legitimate.

This is consistent with their historical roots in the Churches of Christ, which believe that Christ established only one church, and that the use of denominational creeds serves to foster division among Christians. This belief dates to the beginning of the Restoration Movement; Thomas Campbell expressed an ideal of unity in his Declaration and address: "The church of Jesus Christ on earth is essentially, intentionally, and constitutionally one."

==== Lifestyle beliefs ====
The ICOC is opposed to abortion, recreational drugs, and non-marital sexual relations. Homosexuals are welcome, but they must lead a life of chastity. Members' romantic partners require approval by the church.

=== Practices ===
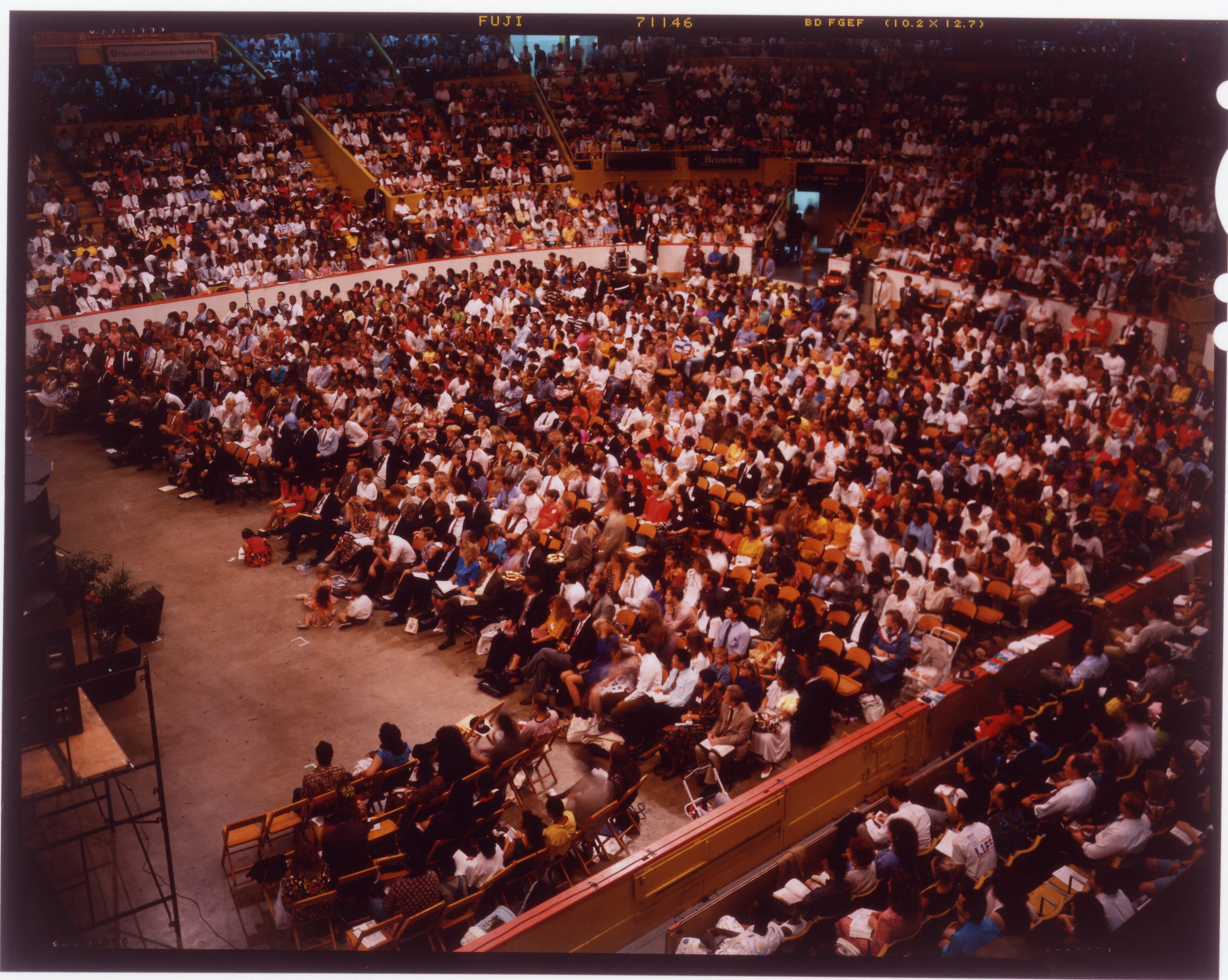
An ICOC Church Service in the Boston Garden. Prior to the building's demolition in 1998, the Massachusetts congregation held Sunday services in the Boston Garden arena.

==== Sunday worship ====
A typical Sunday morning service involves singing, praying, preaching, and the sacrament of the Lord's Supper. An unusual element of ICOC tradition is the lack of established church buildings. Congregations meet in rented spaces: hotel conference rooms, schools, public auditoriums, conference centers, small stadiums, or rented halls, depending on the number of parishioners. Though the church is not static, neither is it ad hoc – the leased locale is converted into a worship facility. "From an organizational standpoint, it's a great idea", observes Boston University Chaplain Bob Thornburg. "They put very little money into buildings...You put your money into people who reach out to more people in order to help them become Christians."

This practice of not owning buildings changed when the Tokyo Church of Christ became the first ICOC church to build its own church building. This building was designed by the Japanese architect Fumihiko Maki. This became an example for other ICOC churches to follow.

==== Discipling ====
===== McKean era (1979–2002) =====
A distinguishing feature of the ICOC under McKean was an intense form of discipleship. McKean's mentor, evangelist Chuck Lucas, developed this practice based in part on the book "The Master Plan of Evangelism" by Robert Coleman. Coleman's book taught that "Jesus controlled the lives of the apostles, that Jesus taught the apostles to 'disciple' by controlling the lives of others, and that Christians should imitate this process when bringing people to Christ." Under McKean, "discipling" entailed members being "assigned a more senior adviser who is always available and frequently present in their lives, even at intimate moments, which mentors them through relationship difficulties. In this practice, individuals interact with other group members in hierarchical relationships". According to Kathleen E. Jenkins's ethnography of the church, McKean viewed discipling as "the most efficient way to achieve the movement's stated goal: 'to evangelize the world in one generation'".

The church's emphasis on discipling during this period was the subject of criticism. A number of ex-members expressed problems with discipling in the ICOC. Critics and former members allege that discipling "involved public scorn as a way to humiliate vulnerable members, to keep them humble". Jenkins notes that "[t]his ICOC structure has been greatly criticized by anti-cult organizations, university officials (the ICOC has been banned from several campuses), and ex-members".

Discipling under McKean was mandatory. All disciples (i.e., baptized members) had to be paired with and mentored by a more mature Christian. They had to check in with their discipler frequently, such as daily or weekly, and were held accountable by them. This included the activities and Church contribution a disciple would give (typically 15-30% including "special contribution"). Disciples were also held accountable for how many new people they met on a daily basis and recruited into the church. Anyone criticizing the authority of a discipler was publicly rebuked in group meetings.

According to Jenkins's ethnography of the church, those who left the ICOC were to be shunned, and disciples were told that only those baptized within the ICOC were saved; all other people were damned. Furthermore, anyone that left the church would also lose their salvation.

A 1999 study found that a substantial minority of former ICOC members included in the study "reached clinically significant levels of psychological distress, depression, dissociation, anxiety, and posttraumatic stress disorder (PTSD) symptoms." Two-thirds of them had sought psychotherapy after leaving the church.

Nonetheless, many disciples, including some who left, got a great deal out of the structure of the discipling system. They found "meaning and community" and formed close friendships across racial and class lines within the ICOC. Sociologist Dr. Joseph E. Lee posits that the strict discipling program helped lead to a lowering of barriers between races and classes. He found this to be a general characteristic of organizations (e.g., martial arts schools) with strong formal beliefs and discipline. Kathleen Jenkins found that "Discipling [...] created tightly bound networks that threw members into frequent contact with disciples from different backgrounds who intimately and routinely intervened in all aspects of an individual's life. These intimate racially and ethnically diverse discipling networks provided members with social resources such as childcare, teen counseling, tutoring, employment opportunities, domestic help, and other kinds of assistance in day-to-day living."

===== Post McKean era (2002–present) =====
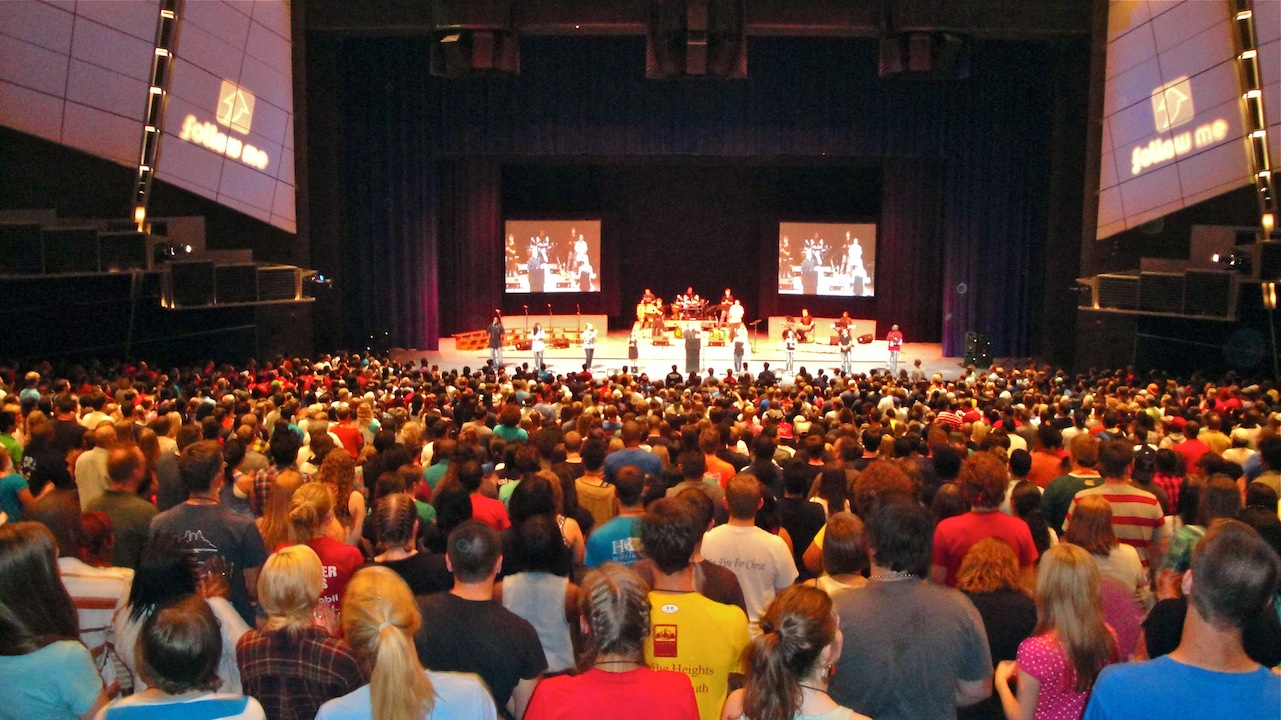
The International Campus Ministry Conferences held in Chicago in 2009

According to Joseph Yi, writing in 2009, with the departure of McKean in 2002 the ICOC transitioned from a top-down organization to a "loose federation of autonomous local churches". This led to a change in discipling practices. One of the local ICOC churches, the Chicago Church of Christ, made discipling voluntary and not mandatory. Instead of a top-down hierarchy, they adopted a "servant leadership" model.

==== Love bombing ====
The ICOC has been accused of using the tactic of "love bombing", which David Barrett describes as "showing a great deal of love, affection and attention to prospective members to draw them in", resulting in the criticism that "vulnerable or lonely people, and this includes many students, will be attracted by this". Journalist Alasdair Belling has noted that this attention and praise "slowly becomes more conditional over time".

=== Racial integration in ICOC churches ===
ICOC churches generally demonstrate a higher level of racial integration than many other religious congregations, reflecting a core value of the denomination. Racial prejudice is considered a personal sin that is believed to be overcome upon baptism and entry into church membership. Jenkins notes that “mandatory close and frequent social interaction forced members to develop such strong cross-racial and ethnic networks”. In 2004, Kevin S. Wells reported that the multicultural nature of ICOC congregations had attracted positive attention from national media.

In 2017, the ICOC launched an initiative called SCUAD (Social, Cultural, Unity, and Diversity) to promote racial dialogue, education, and action within its churches. By 2021, many local congregations had formed their own SCUAD groups. However, some members expressed concern, viewing SCUAD’s explicit discussions on racism as aligned with critical race theory. Despite this backlash, by 2022 most congregations had begun engaging in conversations around racial inclusion, diversity, and justice. Still, as Michael Burns observed, “It seemed [...] that very few had undertaken to carefully examine their history, beliefs, practices, and systems and subsequently engaged in significant structural change”.

== University campuses ==
Starting from his own college days in the 1970s, McKean and the churches he has led (e.g., ICOC and its predecessors and successors) made recruiting on college campuses a priority.

In 1994, the New York Times reported that Campus Advance, the ICOC's campus ministry, had been accused of using "high-pressure tactics" to "systematically target and isolate recruits and deprive them of food and sleep in carefully coordinated steps to break down resistance and cause mental confusion", saying former members compared the group's tactics to those of a cult. In response, a spokesperson for the New York Church of Christ stated that "This word 'cult' is so inflammatory and thrown around so loosely that it is completely unfair and totally unfounded". The articles noted that "representatives of the church say their actions are misrepresented by religious groups jealous of their ability to appeal to young adults". The New York Times noted that "complaints against the church and its campus affiliates are strikingly uniform in portraying church members as adept in singling out vulnerable targets, like lonely students, and enveloping them rapidly with a psychological dependency that is difficult to break", while the Church leaders rejects nearly every allegation.

In 1996, the dean of Boston University's Marsh Chapel, Rev. Robert Watts Thornburg, referred to the church as "the most destructive religious group I've ever seen". Thornburg stated that the church's "[r]ecruitment techniques include the duplicitous use of love and high pressure harassment, producing incredibly high levels of false guilt" and that "The group cuts across the very core of what higher education is about. It refuses to receive questions or have any kind of discussion of an idea. It simply says 'Believe and obey', and if you do anything else you are hard of heart". An evangelist for the church responded to the allegations by stating that "We are a very, very different church from what's already established" and that "Whenever you see something radical or different, of course you're going to get that label that it's a cult".

In 2000, a U.S. News & World Report article by Carolyn Kleiner on proselytizing on college campuses described the ICOC as a "fast-growing Christian organization known for aggressive proselytizing to college students" and as "one of the most controversial religious groups on campus". Kleiner states that "some ex-members and experts on mind-control assert [it] is a cult". The article quotes ICOC spokesperson Al Baird, who stated "We're no more a cult than Jesus was a cult", and sociologist Jeffrey K. Hadden, who was in agreement with Baird and stated that "every new religion experiences a high level of tension with society because its beliefs and ways are unfamiliar. But most, if they survive, we come to accept as part of the religious landscape".

A 2004 edition of the Encyclopedia of Evangelism reported that academics had complained that their students who get involved with the group tend to lose interest in their studies.

Anna Kira Hippert and Sarah Harvey of the Religion Media Centre noted in 2021 that the ICOC's discipling system together with its university campus activities "made the ICOC one of the more controversial new Christian groups in the UK".

As investigation by the Simmons Voice found that the ICOC has been using the name Alpha Omega on campuses since 2015 or earlier.

=== University responses ===
Boston University banned the group in either 1987 or 1989; by that time, it was reported that 50 students per year were dropping out of school to join the church. The ICOC was reportedly the first religious group to have been banned by Boston University. This was followed in 1994 when the ICOC was also banned from American University and George Washington University.

By November 1996, information compiled by the American Family Foundation indicated that the ICOC had been barred from recruiting students or denied official student organization status by 22 US colleges and universities. The decisions were primarily based on accusations of harassment or violations of campus policies. The group has also faced restrictions internationally, and in 1998 it was reported that the ICOC had been banned from some university campuses in the United Kingdom, including in London, Edinburgh, Glasgow, and Manchester.

A specific incident at the State University of New York at Purchase led to a court case that was settled in March 2000. The case stemmed from a 1998 event in which the university had suspended an ICOC member for allegedly "intimidating ... harassing ... and detaining" another student and had banned the church from holding services on campus. As part of the settlement, the student was reinstated and the ICOC was again permitted to use campus facilities. That same year, a report from US News & World Report noted that "[a]t least 39 institutions, including Harvard and Georgia State, [had] outlawed the organization at one time or another for violating rules" concerning recruiting and harassment.

During the 2020s, the ICOC was banned from operating at a number of Australian universities. For example, the group is formally banned at the University of New South Wales; however, the student group has repeatedly renamed itself to maintain a presence on campus. In April 2025, the Swarthmore Phoenix reported that "A current and complete tally of institutions where the ICOC is banned is complicated by the church's international reach and frequent name changes" but that "among the institutions where the ICOC is banned, however, are Harvard University, Vanderbilt University, Boston University, Northeastern University, Marquette University, the College of the Holy Cross, Smith College, the University of Texas at Arlington, and the University of New South Wales".

== See also ==
- History of Christianity
- New religious movement
- Restorationism
- Second Great Awakening
- Non-denominational Christianity
- John Oakes (apologist)

== Works cited ==
- Barrett, David V. (2001). The New Believers: A Survey of Sects, 'Cults' and Alternative Religions. London: Cassell & Co. ISBN 0304355925.
- Chryssides, George D.; Wilkins, Margaret Z. (2014). Christians in the Twenty-First Century. Abingdon: Routledge. ISBN 9781845532130.
- Jenkins, Kathleen E. (2005). Awesome Families: The Promise of Healing Relationships in the International Churches of Christ. New Brunswick, NJ: Rutgers University Press. ISBN 9780813536637. JSTOR j.ctt5hj239.
- Stanczak, Gregory C. (2000). "The Traditional as Alternative: The GenX Appeal of the International Church of Christ". In Flory, Richard W.; Miller, Donald E. (eds.). GenX Religion. New York, NY: Psychology Press. pp. 113–135. ISBN 9780415925709.
- Yi, Joseph E. (2009). God and Karate on the Southside: Bridging Differences, Building American Communities. Lanham, MD: Lexington Books. ISBN 978-0739138373.
