= International Camp on Communication and Computers =

Disability organization based in Austria

The International Camp on Communication and Computers (ICC) is a non-profit organisation organising annual camps for partially sighted and blind youth in Europe. Every year, the camp is hosted by a different institution (typically schools for the blind or universities) in a European country.

== Concept ==
The idea behind the camp is very simple. It focuses on enhancing the participants' technical and social skills, both of which are of great importance to enable the students being integrated into mainstream education. The usage of IT and AT is highly encouraged and taught in workshops driven by participants' choice. Also, the participants are supported in the process of choosing their future study and get information how to organise it. Besides that, the participants get to build up and strengthen an international network, which serves as a platform for exchange and advice.

=== Programme ===
The day typically starts with breakfast at 7.30 am. Workshops are held in the morning (9.00 am - 12.00 pm) and afternoon (2.00 pm - 5.00 pm). During the workshops, there are small coffee breaks. In the evening, there are different leisure time activities, as well as the opportunity to go to the city. The participants are basically responsible for themselves, although there are always staff members and volunteers ready to help. There's always an excursion day, on which all the participants can discover a special place near the host.

The workshops deal with every aspect of the participants' lives. While there workshops dealing with general life skills, social issues and culture, there are others dealing with specific software (e.g. JAWS).

Leisure time activities may differ on the host and its environment. They can again range from crafting to sightseeing.

== History ==
The efforts to support blind and partially sighted students at the universities of Linz and Karlsruhe led to considerations on how to support the transition from school to university. These considerations encouraged founders Klaus Miesenberger and Joachim Klaus to make up a concept to get in touch with possible students at an early stage. To get some experiences, there was a national computer camp in Austria in 1993.

=== Camps and locations ===
Since 1993, the camp took place in various European countries and brought together about 1700 participants and 1300 staff members.

- 1st Integrating Computer Camp 1993, Graz, Austria
- 1st International Computer Camp 1994, Graz and Linz, Austria
- 2nd International Computer Camp 1995, Graz and Linz, Austria
- 3rd International Computer Camp 1996, Graz and Linz, Austria
- 4th International Computer Camp 1997, Zeist, Netherlands
- 5th International Computer Camp 1998, Villeurbanne and Clermont-Ferrand, France
- 6th International Computer Camp 1999, Stockholm, Sweden
- 7th International Computer Camp 2000, Stuttgart, Germany
- 8th International Computer Camp 2001, Škofja Loka, Slovenia
- 9th International Computer Camp 2002, Loughborough, United Kingdom
- 10th International Computer Camp 2003, Zollikofen, Switzerland
- 11th International Computer Camp 2004, Budapest, Hungary
- 12th International Camp on Communication and Computers 2005, Brno, Czech Republic
- 13th International Camp on Communication and Computers 2006, Königs Wusterhausen, Germany
- 14th International Camp on Communication and Computers 2007, Espoo, Finland
- 15th International Camp on Communication and Computers 2009, Vienna, Austria
- 16th International Camp on Communication and Computers 2010, Nea Erythraia, Greece
- 17th International Camp on Communication and Computers 2011, Florence and Ferrara, Italy
- 18th International Camp on Communication and Computers 2012, Cluj-Napoca, Romania
- 19th International Camp on Communication and Computers 2013, Telč, Czech Republic
- 20th International Camp on Communication and Computers 2014, Riga, Latvia
- 21st International Camp on Communication and Computers 2015, Zeist, Netherlands
- 22nd International Camp on Communication and Computers 2016, Dresden, Germany
- 23rd International Camp on Communication and Computers 2017, Leuven, Belgium
- 24th International Camp on Communication and Computers 2018, Zadar, Croatia
- 25th International Camp on Communication and Computers 2019, Hereford, United Kingdom
- The International Camp 2020 did not happen due to COVID-19, it was going to be in Avero, Portugal
- 26th International Camp on Communication and Computers 2021, held digitally
- 27th International Camp on Communication and Computers 2022, held digitally
- 28th International Camp on Communication and Computers 2023, Telč, Czech Republic
- 29th International Camp on Communication and Computers 2024, Rome, Italy
- 30th International Camp on Communication and Computers 2025, Aveiro, Portugal

In 2026, the ICC takes place in Croatia. Be
