= Information Control Company =

g2o
- Company type: Private
- Industry: Digital experience and technology
- Founded: 1979 as DEC VAX VAR
- Headquarters: Columbus, Ohio, USA
- Key people: Kelly Gratz, Chief Executive Officer Blane Walter, Chairman of the Board
- Revenue: $80+ million
- Number of employees: 500+
- Website: www.g2o.com

G2O, formerly Information Control Company (ICC), formerly Information Control Corporation, is headquartered in Columbus, Ohio, United States. It is the largest Ohio-owned digital experience and technology consulting company.

The company employs more than 500 analysts, designers, developers, system and data engineers, researchers, and strategists.

Their client list includes financial institutions, health care organizations, government agencies, insurance companies, retailers, and educators.

== History ==
The company was founded in 1979 as DEC VAX VAR, a software reseller and consultant. In the mid-1980s, one-time CEO Steven Glaser became a partner and investor in the company along with former President, John Kratz.

By the 1990s, the company had become ICC and expanded its offerings to include software development and IT staffing services. This evolution continued into the 2000s when ICC formed Clutch, a division focused on interactive design. During this time the company experienced tremendous growth, becoming the largest privately held IT consulting firm based in Central Ohio, with over 500 employees.

Over the years the company shifted its focus from software reseller to IT staffing company. Most recently the company has focused on technology development more broadly. In 2013, Blane Walter joined the company as Chairman of the Board and one of three equal partners in the firm.

In October, 2013, ICC acquired Farsite Group, a team of data scientists with expertise in Predictive Analytics, to augment its existing data and analytics services.

In 2018, Kelly Gratz joined the company as its new president and was promoted to CEO in 2019.

In addition to its Columbus headquarters, g2o opened a Cleveland office in 2019.

== Rebranding ==
In August 2019, ICC announced that its Clutch division, a brand focused on human-centered design, would be integrated with its two other divisions to form a new company, g2o.

== See also ==
- MVC4WPF
