= Branhamism =

Religious doctrine taught by William Marrion Branham

"Branhamism" (also known as "Branhamology") refers to the unique theology and key doctrines taught by William Marrion Branham, including his eschatological views, annihilationism, oneness of the Godhead, predestination, eternal security, and the serpent's seed. Branham's followers refer to his teachings collectively as "The Message" and call themselves "Message Believers".

Most of Branham's teachings have precedents within sects of the Pentecostal movement or in other non-Pentecostal denominations. The doctrines Branham imported from non-Pentecostal theology and the unique combination of doctrines that he created as a result led to widespread criticism from Pentecostal churches and the Charismatic movement. His unique arrangement of doctrines, coupled with the highly controversial nature of the serpent seed doctrine, caused the alienation of many of his former supporters.

The Full Gospel tradition, which has its roots in Wesleyan Arminianism, is the theology generally adhered to by the Charismatic movement and Pentecostal denominations. Branham's doctrines are a blend of both Calvinism and Arminianism, which are considered contradictory by many theologians; the teachings have been described as "jumbled and contradictory and difficult to categorize". As a result, the theology he developed in the later years of his life seemed "complicated and bizarre" to many people who admired him personally during the years of the healing revival. Many of his followers regard his sermons as oral scripture and believe Branham had rediscovered the true doctrines of the early church.

Paul Schäfer, Robert Martin Gumbura, Leo Mercer, the Malindi cult and other followers of William Branham's teachings have been in the news due to the serious crimes which they committed. Followers of Branham's teachings in Colonia Dignidad were portrayed in the 2015 film Colonia.

== Divine healing ==
Throughout his ministry, Branham taught a doctrine of faith healing that was often his central teaching during the healing campaign. He believed healing was the main focus of the ministry of Jesus Christ and believed in a dual atonement; "salvation for the soul and healing for the body". He believed and taught that miracles ascribed to Christ in the New Testament were also possible in modern times.

Branham believed that all sickness was a result of demonic activity and could be overcome by the faith of the person desiring healing. Branham argued that God was required to heal when faith was present. This led him to conclude that individuals who failed to be healed lacked adequate faith. Branham's teaching on divine healing were within the mainstream of Pentecostal theology and echoed the doctrines taught by Smith Wigglesworth, Bosworth, and other prominent Pentecostal ministers of the prior generation.

== Restorationism ==
Of all of Branham's doctrines, his teachings on Christian restorationism have had the most lasting influence on modern Christianity. Charismatic writer Michael Moriarty described his teachings on the subject as "extremely significant" because they have "impacted every major restoration movement since". As a result, Moriarty concluded Branham has "profoundly influenced" the modern Charismatic movement. Branham taught the doctrine widely from the early days of the healing revival, in which he urged his audiences to unite and restore a form of church organization like the primitive church of early Christianity.

The teaching was accepted and widely taught by many of the evangelists of the healing revival, and they took it with them into the subsequent Charismatic and evangelical movements. Paul Cain, Bill Hamon, Kenneth Hagin, and other restoration prophets cite Branham as a major influence. They played a critical role in introducing Branham's restoration views to the Apostolic-Prophetic Movement, the Association of Vineyard Churches, and other large Charismatic organizations. The Toronto Blessing, the Brownsville Revival, and other nationwide revivals of the late 20th century have their roots in Branham's restorationist teachings.

The teaching holds that Christianity should return to a form mirroring the primitive Christian church. It supports the restoration of apostles and prophets, signs and wonders, spiritual gifts, spiritual warfare, and the elimination of non-primitive features of modern Christianity. Branham taught that by the end of the first century of Christianity, the church "had been contaminated by the entrance of an antichrist spirit". As a result, he believed that from a very early date, the church had stopped following the "pure Word of God" and had been seduced into a false form of Christianity.

He stated the corruption came from the desire of early Christianity's clergy to obtain political power, and as a result became increasingly wicked and introduced false creeds. This led to denominationalism, which he viewed as the greatest threat to true Christianity. Branham viewed Martin Luther as the initiator of a process that would result in the restoration of the true form of Christianity, and traced the advancement of the process through other historic church figures. He believed the rapture would occur at the culmination of this process. Although Branham referred in his sermons to the culmination of the process as a future event affecting other people, he believed he and his followers were fulfilling his restoration beliefs.

== Annihilationism ==
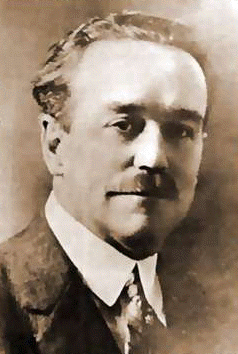
Charles Parham, an early leader of Pentecostalism and preacher of annihilationism

Annihilationism, the doctrine that the damned will be totally destroyed after the final judgment so as to not exist, was introduced to Pentecostalism in the teachings of Charles Fox Parham (1873–1929). Not all Pentecostal sects accepted the idea. Prior to 1957, Branham taught a doctrine of eternal punishment in Hell. By 1957 he began promoting an annihilationist position in keeping with Parham's teachings.

He believed that "eternal life was reserved only for God and his children". In 1960, Branham claimed the Holy Spirit had revealed this doctrine to him as one of the end-time mysteries. Promoting annihilationism led to the alienation of Pentecostal groups that had rejected Parham's teaching on the subject.

== Godhead ==
Like other doctrines, the Godhead formula was a point of doctrinal conflict within Pentecostalism. As Branham began offering his own viewpoint, it led to the alienation of Pentecostal groups adhering to Trinitarianism. Branham shifted his theological position on the Godhead during his ministry. Early in his ministry, Branham espoused a position closer to an orthodox Trinitarian view.

By the early 1950s, he began to privately preach the Oneness doctrine outside of his healing campaigns. By the 1960s, he had changed to openly teaching the Oneness position, according to which there is one God who manifests himself in multiple ways; in contrast with the Trinitarian view that three distinct persons comprise the Godhead.

Branham came to believe that Trinitarianism was tritheism and insisted members of his congregation be re-baptized in Jesus's name in imitation of Paul the Apostle. Branham believed his doctrine had a nuanced difference from the Oneness doctrine and to the end of his ministry he openly argued that he was not a proponent of Oneness doctrine. He distinguished his baptismal formula from the Oneness baptism formula in the name of Jesus by teaching that the baptismal formula should be in the name of Lord Jesus Christ. He argued that there were many people named Jesus but there is only one Lord Jesus Christ. By the end of his ministry, his message required an acceptance of the oneness of the Godhead and baptism in the name of Lord Jesus Christ.

== Opposition to modern culture ==
As Branham's ministry progressed, he increasingly condemned modern culture. According to Weaver, Branham's views on modern culture were the primary reason the growing Charismatic movement rejected him; his views also prevented him from following his contemporaries who were transitioning from the healing revival to the new movement. He taught that immoral women and education were the central sins of modern culture. Branham viewed education as "Satan's snare for intellectual Christians who rejected the supernatural" and "Satan's tool for obscuring the 'simplicity of the Message and the messenger'". Weaver wrote that Branham held a "Christ against Culture" opinion, according to which loyalty to Christ requires rejection of non-Christian culture.

Pentecostalism inherited the Wesleyan doctrine of entire sanctification and outward holiness from its founders, who came from Wesleyan-influenced denominations of the post-American Civil War era. The rigid moral code associated with the holiness movement had been widely accepted by Pentecostals in the early twentieth century. Branham's strict moral code echoed the traditions of early Pentecostalism but became increasingly unpopular because he refused to accommodate mid-century Pentecostalism's shifting viewpoint. He denounced cigarettes, alcohol, television, rock and roll, and many forms of worldly amusement.

Branham strongly identified with the lower-class roots of Pentecostalism and advocated living an ascetic lifestyle. When he was given a new Cadillac, he kept it parked in his garage for two years out of embarrassment. Branham openly chastised other evangelists, who seemed to be growing wealthy from their ministries and opposed the prosperity messages being taught. Branham did not view financial prosperity as an automatic result of salvation. He rejected the financial aspects of the prosperity gospel that originated in the teachings of Oral Roberts and A. A. Allen. Branham condemned any emphasis on expensive church buildings, elaborate choir robes, and large salaries for ministers, and insisted the church should focus on the imminent return of Christ.

Branham's opposition to modern culture emerged most strongly in his condemnation of the "immorality of modern women". He taught that women with short hair were breaking God's commandments and "ridiculed women's desire to artificially beautify themselves with makeup". Branham believed women were guilty of committing adultery if their appearance was intended to motivate men to lust, and viewed a woman's place as "in the kitchen". Citing the creation story in which Eve is taken from Adam's side, Branham taught that woman was not part of God's original creation, and she was a byproduct of man.

There is nothing designed to stoop so low, or be filthy, but a woman. A dog can't do it, a hog can't do it, a bird can't do it. No animal is immoral, nor it can be, for it is not designed so it can be. A female hog can't be immoral, a female dog can't be immoral, a female bird can't be immoral. A woman is the only thing can do it. She is designed, alone, for filth and unclean living. ... A dog can't, and no other female can. It's just the woman that can. A dog or any other animals, once a year, and that for her babies; not for sexual pleasure, but for her babies. The old sow hog, the old slut dog, once a year, one moment, that's for her babies. But a woman is designed for any time she desires. ... A woman is a by-product of a man. She's not even in the original creation. That's exactly right. ... By her beauty and her sex control, her shape that was given to her by Satan, the by-product that Satan did, she is sent to deceive sons of God. And she can sway more of them to hell than any other instrument Satan has got. That's exactly right. Only a piece, scrap, made of a man, to deceive him by; God made it, right here has proved it. That's what she was made for.

— William Branham, "Marriage and Divorce", February 21, 1965

According to Weaver, "his pronouncements with respect to women were often contradictory". Branham once told women who refused to dress according to his instructions "not to call themselves Christians" but qualified his denunciations by affirming that obedience to the holiness moral code was not a requirement for salvation. While he did not condemn women who refused the holiness moral code to Hell, he insisted they would not be part of the rapture.

Weaver wrote that Branham's attitude to women concerning physical appearance, sexual drive, and marital relations was misogynistic, and he also wrote that Branham saw modern women as "essentially immoral sexual machines who were to blame for adultery, divorce and death. To Branham, modern women were the tools of the Devil." Some of Branham's contemporaries accused him of being a "woman hater", but he insisted he only hated immorality. According to Edward Babinski, women who follow the holiness moral code Branham supported regard it as "a badge of honor".

== Serpent seed, predestination, and race ==
Branham taught an unorthodox doctrine about the source of original sin. He believed that the story of the fall of man in the Garden of Eden is allegorical and interpreted it to mean that the serpent had sexual intercourse with Eve, and their offspring was Cain. Branham also taught the belief that Cain's modern descendants were masquerading as educated people and scientists, and they were "a big religious bunch of illegitimate bastard children" who comprised the majority of society's criminals. He believed that the serpent was an intelligent human-like ape which he described as the missing link between the chimpanzee and man. Branham believed that the serpent was transformed into a reptile or a snake after it was cursed by God.

Branham believed that the term "predestination" was widely misunderstood and as a result, he preferred to use the word "foreknowledge" to describe his views. Branham's teachings about predestination were deeply connected to his serpent seed doctrine. Branham taught the belief that humanity's choice in salvation was negated by their ancestry, and he also taught the belief that genetics determined one's eternal destiny; the offspring of Cain were foreordained to damnation while the offspring of Seth were foreordained to salvation.

Weaver commented that Branham seemed to be unaware that his teachings conflicted with free will. Branham taught a Calvinistic form of the doctrine of predestination and the doctrine of preservation, supporting a belief in eternal security, both of which were at odds with the Arminian view of predestination which was held by adherents of Pentecostalism. Unlike his views on the Godhead and Annihilationism, there was no precedent for his views on predestination within Pentecostalism, a fact which opened him up to widespread criticism. Branham lamented the fact that more so than any other teaching, Pentecostals criticized him for his predestination teachings.

According to Steven Hassan, "Branham's sermons lay the foundation for the belief that black people are members of an inferior race." Branham used the term "hybrid" to describe anything which he believed was tainted by the serpent. Branham accused Eve of producing a "hybrid" race, and he provided a way to trace the hybrid line of the serpent's seed to Africans and Jews through Ham the biblical progenitor of the African peoples, King Ahab, and Judas Iscariot.

Branham reportedly discussed the belief that blacks were descended from apes as early as 1929, but he claimed that he rejected the belief at that time. In his recorded sermons, Branham first publicly hinted at his belief in the serpent seed doctrine in 1953. He began to openly teach serpent seed in 1958 at the height of racial unrest in the United States.

Doug Weaver, Jon Schambers, and Michael Barkun have investigated Branham's serpent seed doctrine to identify the origin of it. Weaver suggested that Branham may have become acquainted with the serpent seed doctrine through his Baptist roots. All three have suggested that Branham may have been influenced by the teachings of Baptist minister Daniel Parker's two-seed doctrine. Although it was not widely accepted, Parker's teachings were well known among Baptists in Indiana and Kentucky; Parker also connected the serpent's seed to the non-white races.

Barkun and Schambers also connected Branham's teaching to the white supremacy movement and Christian Identity preacher Wesley Swift. Branham was baptized and ordained by Roy Davis, a founding member and later an Imperial Wizard of the Ku Klux Klan; Branham and Davis continued to associate with each other throughout Branham's life. Barkun wrote that Branham was the most significant proponent of the racial teaching along with Wesley Swift and other proponents of the Christian Identity movement. Steven Hassan described Branham's serpent seed teachings as "rebranded" Christian Identity theology.

Branham was open about the implications of his beliefs and he publicly supported segregation.

God is a segregationalist [sic]. I am too. Any Christian's a segregation. God segregates His people from all the rest of them. They're... They've always been a segregation. He chose a nation. He chooses a people. He is a segregationalist [sic]. He made all nations. But still, a real genuine Christian has to be a segregationalist [sic]. Separating himself from the things of the world and everything, and come into one purpose, Jesus Christ.

— William Branham, Who Do You Say This Is?, December 27, 1964

Branham also openly opposed interracial relationships and he connected people of mixed race ancestry to the wicked "hybrid" race of the serpent.

What good would a white woman want to have a baby by a colored man making him a mulatto child? It's not sensible. ... If I was a colored man, or a brown man, or a yellow man, or a red man, I would be just as happy about it. Yes, sir. I sure would. That's the way that my Maker wanted me and that's the way I am. Right. Why does man want to tamper with anything for? When man gets into it, he ruins it. Let it alone the way God made it. Let a man be what he is; by the grace of God let him be. But he has to cause great fusses now calling our... causing riots, and big fusses, and everything else across the nations, and across the world just because he wanted to stick his head out about something. That's the ignorance of the man. That's right; hybrid again. Instead of leaving it the way God wants it, he wants to make his own way. He has to do something about it, you know. He has to make his own self a name. God be merciful to him. It's a pitiful thing.

— William Branham, But It Wasn't So From The Beginning, April 11, 1960

According to the Southern Poverty Law Center, "Not all Branham churches are racist or embrace the anti-race-mixing position," "but the theology clearly invites racism." Weaver called Serpent Seed Branham's "most disreputable" doctrine. Branham's embrace of the serpent seed doctrine alienated most of the members of his Pentecostal audience. According to Pearry Green, the broader Pentecostal movement considers Branham's version of the serpent seed doctrine repugnant and in their point of view, it was the "filthy doctrine ... that ruined his ministry." No other mainstream Christian group held a similar view; Branham was widely criticized for spreading the doctrine.

Branham's followers consider the serpent seed doctrine one of his greatest revelations, and they also consider it his most original revelation; despite its racist nature, most of them are unaware of the origins of the teaching within the white supremacy movement. When confronted with the accusations of racism, some of his followers have denied the teaching of serpent seed has any connection to white supremacy or racism, and have pointed out that non-white followers of Branham accept the doctrine and its implications. Some African followers of Branham's teachings have embraced the racial components and openly call for the "submission of the black man to the white man". Hassan wrote that Branham's followers use "deceptive tactics to recruit and indoctrinate unsuspecting people," and that "recruiters do not tell new members" about the historic "deep ties to white supremacy groups." Leaders in Branham's movement have taken actions to prevent followers from discovering the true origin of the serpent seed teaching.

Branham reportedly referred to Paul the Apostle as "a short, stooped over, hook nose, high-tempered Jew".

== Eschatology and the seven seals ==
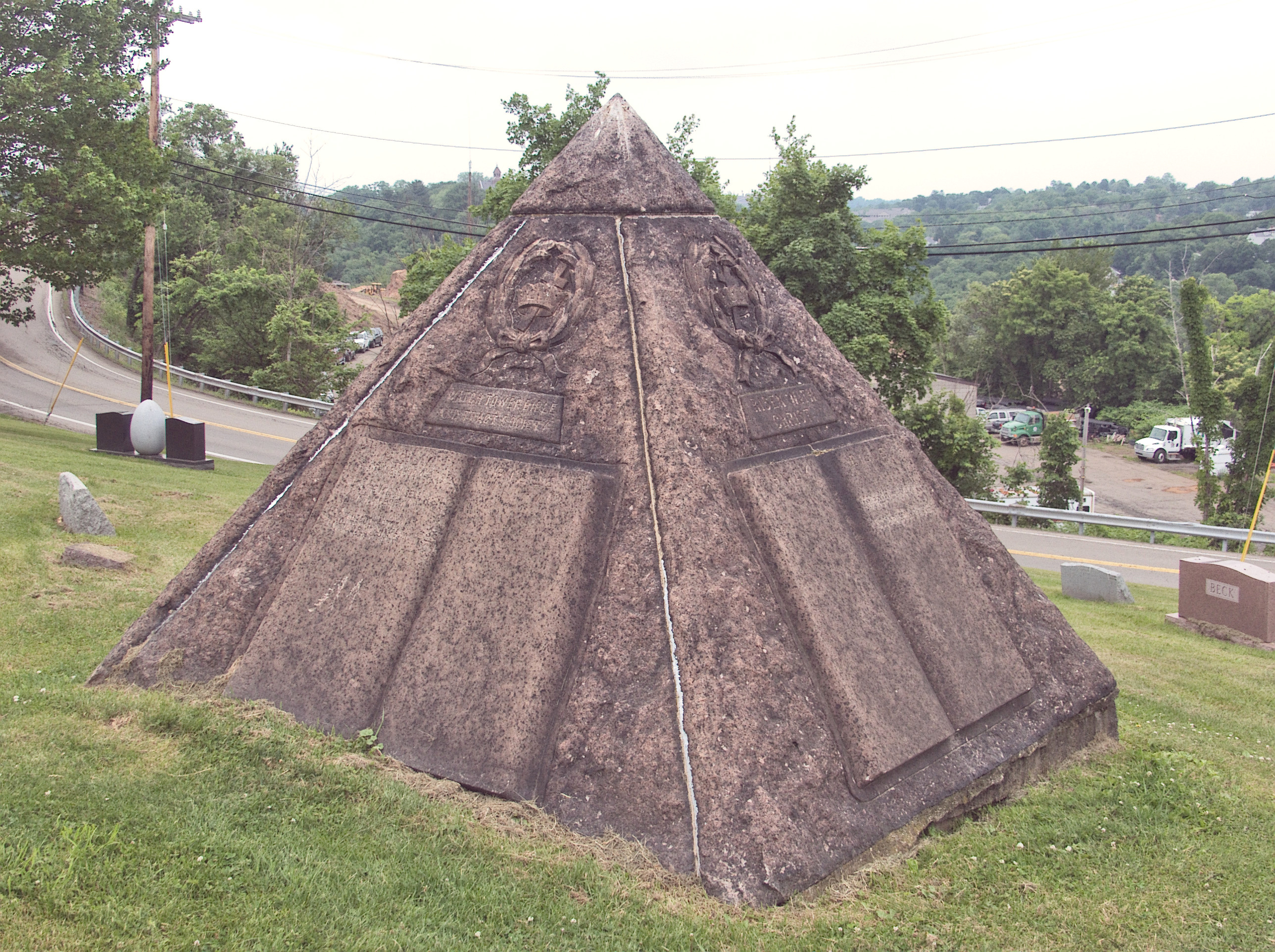
A pyramid monument at the grave of Jehovah's Witness founder Charles Taze Russell (1852–1916), early preacher of the church ages and the first to claim to be the Laodicean Messenger. Russell's teachings were a major influence on Branham.

In his later years, Branham began to preach almost exclusively on biblical prophecy. In 1960, Branham preached a series of sermons on the seven church ages based on chapters two and three of the Book of Revelation. The sermons used the dispensational system of C. I. Scofield, Clarence Larkin, and Jehovah's Witness founder Charles Taze Russell. As in their dispensational systems, Branham said each church represents a historical age, and that the angel of each age was a significant church figure. Branham identified historical Christian figures as church age messengers, naming some of the same men as Russell.

Whereas Russell had claimed to be the seventh messenger himself during the 1890s, Branham's sermons differed and he described his own characteristics as the attributes of the Laodicean Church age messenger; Branham believed the age would immediately precede the rapture. Branham explained the Laodicean age would be immoral in a way comparable to Sodom and Gomorrah, and it would be a time in which Christian denominations rejected Christ. As described by Branham, the characteristics of the Laodicean age resemble the modern era.

Branham also asserted the final messenger would be a mighty prophet who put the Word of God first, that he would be a lover of the wilderness, that he would hate wicked women, and be an uneducated person. Branham compared the messenger to this last age to John the Baptist and said he would come in the spirit of Elijah the prophet and cited the Book of Malachi 4:5–6 (3:23–24 in Hebrew) as the basis for claiming the Elijah spirit would return.

Branham preached a series of sermons in 1963 on the seven seals, which he regarded as a highlight of his ministry. Branham believed the sermons would produce "rapturing faith" which was necessary for his followers to escape the tribulation, and that the sermons contained "the complete revelation of Jesus Christ". Weaver wrote that "the importance of the revelation of the seals to Branham's 'prophetic' identity cannot be overestimated". Branham viewed the revelation of the seals as the crowning achievement of his ministry and the ultimate fulfillment of his purpose as a prophet.

According to Weaver, the sermons were primarily "a restatement of the dispensationalism espoused in the sermons on the seven church ages". The sermons focused on the Book of Revelation 6:1–17, and provided an interpretation of the meaning of each of the seals, which Branham connected with his prior sermons on the church ages. Like his sermons on the church ages, Branham's sermons on the seals were largely borrowed from the writings of Charles Taze Russell and Clarence Larkin.

Branham claimed the sermons were inspired through an angelic visitation and the appearance of what he believed to be a supernatural cloud in Arizona that was visible in the American Southwest on February 28, 1963. Branham interpreted the cloud to be the face of Jesus Christ, and a fulfillment of 1 Thessalonians 4:16: "For the Lord himself shall descend from heaven with a shout". Branham believed the events of 1963 indicated the rapture was imminent. As a result of his teachings, many of Branham's followers believe that Jesus Christ returned in some form in 1963.

By 1987, it was widely known the cloud Branham believed to be supernatural had been manmade and was reported as such by Weaver in his first biography of Branham. James McDonald of the University of Arizona Institute of Atmospheric Physics was present when the 1963 cloud phenomena appeared. He investigated the phenomena and discovered that the cloud had been created by an exploded Thor rocket carrying a classified spy satellite launched from Vandenberg Air Force Base that failed to make orbit.

The United States Air Force later declassified the launch records and acknowledged the manmade origin of the cloud. Military personnel involved in the launch stated that they had "immediately recognized the McDonald cloud as from an explosion of a rocket the afternoon of 28 February 1963". Branham claimed to his audiences that he was hunting in Arizona when angels appeared to him and created the cloud overhead. Peter Duyzer presented evidence that Branham falsely claimed to be hunting in Arizona when the cloud appeared, and was actually in Texas where he was assisting with efforts to have the death sentence of Leslie Elaine Perez overturned.

In his sermons on the seven seals, Branham again indicated he was a prophet who had the anointing of Elijah and was a messenger heralding the second coming of Christ. Branham did not directly claim to be the end-time messenger in either of his sermons on the church ages or the seven seals. Weaver believed Branham desired to be the eschatological prophet he was preaching about, but had self-doubt. At the time, Branham continued to leave the identity of the messenger open to the interpretation of his followers, who widely accepted that he was that messenger.

Beginning in 1958, Branham began to claim Luke 17:30 was being fulfilled. By the 1960s, he began to make frequent references to the scripture claiming that through his ministry the "Son of Man was being revealed". (Note: "Let me close by saying this: that the Son of man is now being revealed from heaven. "Will it come after while, Brother Branham?" It is now." William Branham, Called Out – January 9, 1958) According to Weaver, Branham's "obsession with Luke 17:30 and Malachi 4:5–6 dominated the end of his ministry". In 1964 and 1965 he began to make special emphasis that the Son of Man could only be revealed through the ministry of a prophet. Branham's teachings on the subject caused confusion among his followers who repeatedly asked him to clarify his relationship to Christ. Some of his followers believed he was claiming divinity and were prepared to accept his claims.

Branham's responses and statements on the subject of his divinity were contradictory, leaving his followers divided on the subject. In his final revival meetings before his death, Branham stated "The Elijah of this day is the Lord Jesus Christ. He is to come according to Luke 17:30. The Son of Man is to reveal Himself among His people. Not a man, God. But it'll come through a prophet." His final statement on the subject convinced a number of his followers he was indeed claiming divinity.

== Anti-denominationalism ==
Branham believed that denominationalism was "a mark of the beast", which added to the controversy which surrounded his later ministry. (Note: Weaver records Branham believed that it was "the mark of the beast", whereas Harrell records that he believed that it was "a mark of the beast".) Branham stated that he was not opposed to organizational structures; his concern focused on the "road block to salvation and spiritual unity" he believed that denominations emphasized loyalty to their organizations rather than salvation and spiritual unity. Branham's doctrine was similar to the anti-Catholic rhetoric which was used by proponents of classical Pentecostalism and Protestantism, which commonly associated the mark of the beast with Catholicism.

However, Branham espoused the teaching of Charles Taze Russell, which associated the image of the beast with Protestant denominations. (Note: "... he is now operating to produce a Protestant 'image of the beast' with life, which will cooperate with the chief Antichrist..." Russel, The Finished Mystery, p. 272) In his later years, he came to believe that all denominations were "synagogues of Satan". Branham's teaching was particularly damaging to his relationship with Pentecostal denominations who were angered that he would associate them with the mark of beast.

Scholar Robert Price and Doug Weaver suggested that Branham's stance on denominations was developed in response to their rejection of his teachings in an attempt to maintain the loyalty of his closest followers. Throughout the 1960s, Branham demanded that to demonstrate their loyalty to him and his message, his followers should leave the denominations which they were members of. He argued that continued allegiance to any denomination would lead to an acceptance of the mark of the beast, which would mean that his followers would miss the rapture. He insisted that when he cooperated with denominations, the prior healing revival had been a preparatory step to his campaign to get the attention of God's chosen people, so he could eventually inform them about their need to exclusively follow his teaching ministry.

== Prophecies ==
Branham issued a series of prophecies during his lifetime. One of his first was a prophetic vision he reported having in 1916 foretelling that 16 men would fall to their death during the construction of the Clark Memorial Bridge. Branham claimed repeatedly throughout his ministry that the vision was fulfilled during the 1927–1929 construction of the bridge. According to Douglas Weaver there was no evidence of the drownings having ever occurred. Newspapers reported in June and September of 1929 that two workers had died during construction, but no sources have yet been found for Branham's vision of 16 deaths. Branham also claimed that he foretold the coming of the 1937 Ohio River Flood, the same flood he told his audience led to the death of his wife and daughter.

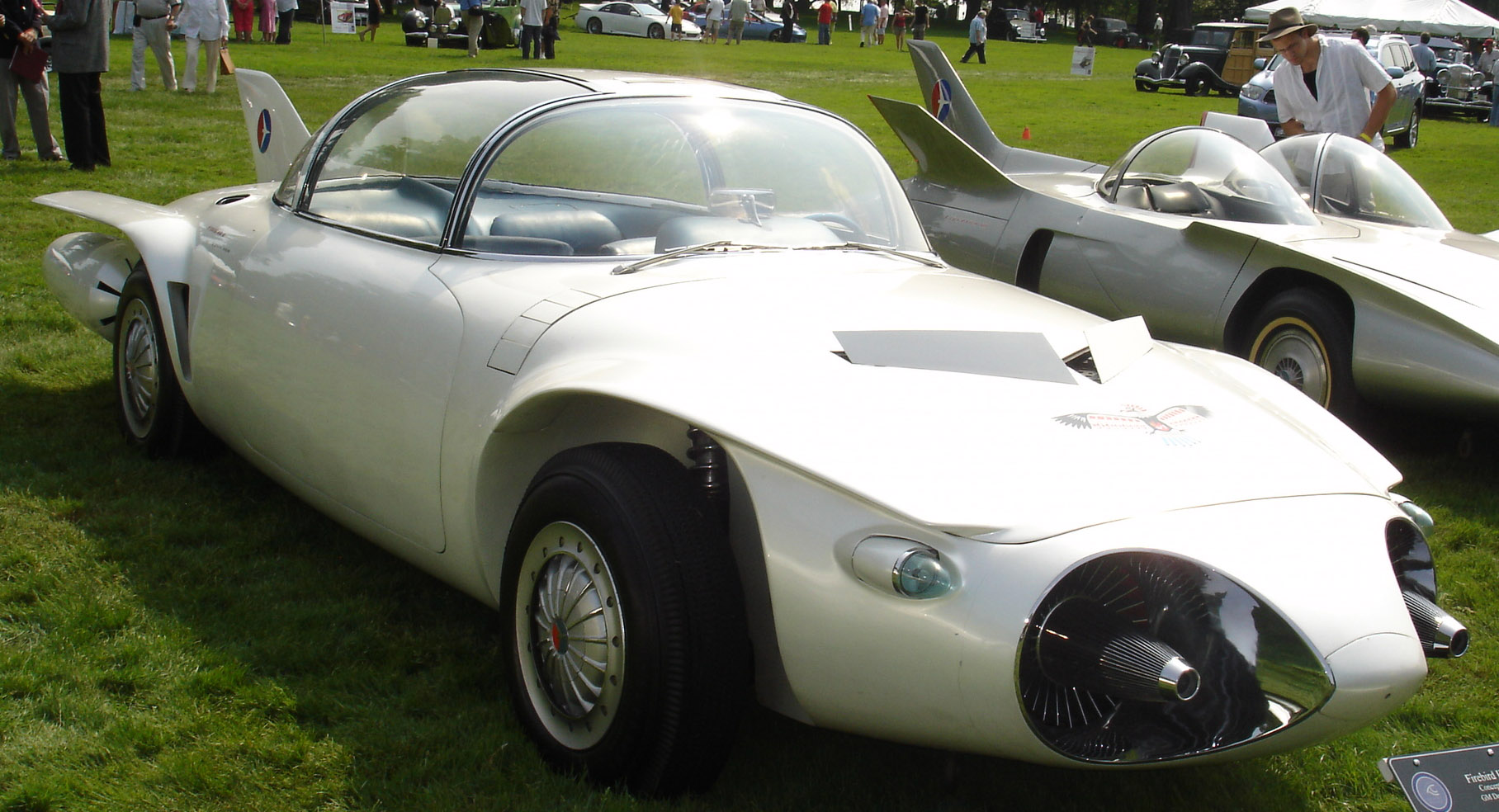
A General Motors self-driving 1956 Firebird II

His most significant prophecies were a series of prophetic visions he claimed to have had in June 1933. The first time he published any information about the visions were in 1953. Branham reported that in his visions he saw seven major events would occur before the second coming of Christ, including the prediction of the rise of Adolf Hitler, the Second World War, the Italian occupation of Ethiopia, and the rise of communism. Most of his predictions had already been fulfilled by the first time he reported the visions in 1953.

In the 1933 visions, he reported seeing self-driving "egg-shaped" cars in one vision. Branham later claimed he saw a car in 1960 that fulfilled his vision. Among the prophecies was also a prediction that the United States would "elect the wrong president" as a result of giving women the right to vote, which he later interpreted to be John F. Kennedy. He also predicted a powerful woman would take control of the United States, which he later interpreted to be the Roman Catholic Church, which he reported as also being fulfilled with the election of Kennedy who was Roman Catholic. His visions ended with the apocalyptic destruction of the United States that left the nation's cities in smoldering ruins.

In 1964, Branham said judgement would strike the west coast of the United States and that Los Angeles would sink into the ocean. Following the 1964 prophecy, Branham was deeply anti-Catholic, and viewed the pope and the Roman Catholic Church as the agents of Satan who would bring about the end of the world.

Weaver wrote that Branham gradually revised and embellished some of his prophecies over time, sometimes substantially. Critics of Branham investigated his prophecies. They claimed that many of Branham prophecies were only publicly reported after their fulfillment. Duzyer also reported that several of Branham's prophecies, like the 16 drownings or the destruction of the United States, were never fulfilled. Branham's followers believe his prophecies came true, or will do so in the future.

Followers of Branham's teachings can be found around the world; Branham claimed to have made over one million converts during his campaign meetings. In 1986, there were an estimated 300,000 followers. (Note: Weaver based his estimate on numbers reported by Branham's son. The estimate included 50,000 in the United States, with a considerable following in Central and South America (including 40,000 in Brazil), India, and Africa; particularly in Kenya, Nigeria, Ghana, and the Democratic Republic of the Congo.) In 2000, the William Branham Evangelical Association had missions on every inhabited continent – with 1,600 associated churches in Latin America and growing missions across Africa. In 2018, Voice of God Recordings claimed to serve Branham-related support material to about two million people through the William Branham Evangelical Association, and estimated there were 2–4 million total followers of Branham's teachings.

Branham's followers do not have a central unifying leadership. Shortly after Branham's death, his followers divided in multiple feuding groups. Many different followers of Branham's teachings have claimed to be his immediate successor, or an Elisha to his Elijah. Many also believe that Branham's son Joseph has claimed the inheritance of his father's ministry. Each of the men claiming to be his successor have established new sects of Branham's followers.

Branham's sons Joseph and Billy Paul lead the William Branham Evangelical Association and hold influence over many churches.

Pearry Green (1933–2015) in Arizona and Ewald Frank in Germany both held influence over a significant number of churches. Tensions over Branham's identity are one the primary causes of divisions between the groups. Followers of Branham's son expect the resurrection of Branham to fulfill unfinished prophecies. Followers of the Green and Frank believe Branham's prophecies will have a spiritual fulfillment and not require his return. Still other groups believe Branham was the return of Christ.

His followers "range widely in belief in practice." Some followers have attempted to reform Branham's most extreme teachings. While most churches adhere to a common set of tenets, the "extreme local authority" of the church promoted by Branham has led to widespread differences in interpretation of Branham's prophetic teachings. One common theme among all groups is the belief that Branham was the return of Elijah the prophet and receiving his prophetic revelations is necessary to escape the impending destruction of the world.

Some groups of Branham's followers refuse medical treatment because of their divine healing beliefs. Many followers of Branham's teachings live within insular communities, with their own schools and with no access to television or internet or outside media. Some groups prohibit their members from having relationships with outsiders. Those who leave are often shunned or disowned.

People who try to leave the teachings of Branham often face extreme repercussions. Carl Dyck wrote, "Those who have come out of this group give solemn evidence of the devastating effect that Branhamism had on them, both emotionally and psychologically. In fact, the followers of Branham pray that evil will come upon people who leave their church." Branham's followers have harassed critics and individuals who reject Branham's teachings. Dyck reported that people who published material critical of Branham's teachings have been threatened by his followers and warned they may be killed. The news media have also reported critics of Branham's teaching being threatened and harassed by his followers.

In his book Churches that Abuse, Ronald Enroth wrote that some churches use Branham's teachings to "belittle, insult, and berate" their members as part of their discipleship teachings on submission, humility, and obedience. According to Enroth, Branham's followers believe subjecting themselves to this treatment is necessary for them to "be refined and perfect" and "ready to meet Jesus" at this second coming. Enroth reported instances of families being separated, with children being taken from their parents and reassigned to other families to be raised as a form of discipline. He also reported multiple cases of physical abuse against both adults and children in the United States and Mexico.

Branham's followers are widely spread throughout the world. In Iran, Branham's followers have faced persecution, with the government shutting down ten of their house churches in 2018 and jailing several Branham followers. In 2020, the Russian government labeled missionaries of Branham's teaching as "extremists" and banned the importation of Branham related publications to the Russian Federation.

Branham's followers are often in the news for criminal activity. In a 2008 California court case, authorities investigating Leo Mercer's group of Branham followers in Arizona discovered that following "Branham's death in 1965, Mercer gradually became more authoritative, employing various forms of punishment. He would ostracize people from the community and separate families. Children were beaten for minor infractions like talking during a march or not tying their shoes. Mercer would punish girls by cutting their hair, and force boys to wear girls' clothing. There was also evidence that Mercer sexually abused children."

"In one instance, Mercer ordered that [a girl's] hair be cut off to punish her because he had had a vision from God that she was being sexually inappropriate with young children. [She] was beaten and forced to wear masculine clothes that covered much of her body, hiding her bruises. Her fingertips were burned so she would know what hell felt like." Mercer sexually abused children and adults. Survivors reported that they subjected themselves to Mercer's abuses because of direction they received personally from Branham.

The Living Word Fellowship, a group of over 100 churches at its peak, was founded by John Robert Stevens, who had been heavily influenced by Branham and promoted many of his doctrines, was often reported in the news during the 1970s and 1980s as a doomsday cult. The organization disbanded in 2018 following widespread allegations of sexual molestation of children.

In 2002, Ralph G. Stair, a leader of a Branham's followers in United States, was arrested and convicted of molesting minors, raping multiple women in his church, and financial crimes.

Paul Schäfer, a follower and promoter of William Branham's teachings based in Chile, was discovered to have been running a compound where he was sexually molesting and torturing children in 1997. "Strong ties were forged" between Schäfer, William Branham, and Ewald Frank during Branham's time in Germany. Schäfer and other members of his church served as William Branham's personal security detail on his 1955 European tour. William Branham's second sermon during his visit to Karlsruhe, Germany, left a deep impression on Schäfer. Schäfer claimed to experience a healing in the meeting, and thereafter began to put more of William Branham's doctrines into practice in his group, and began to insist to his followers that they were the "only faithful ones" to William Branham's teachings. Schäfer had a history of child molestation dating to the 1950s. Schäfer was later arrested in 2006, convicted, and died in prison.

The government of Chile banned Ewald Frank from entering the country after finding he had been visiting and holding revival meetings with Schäfer's followers at Colonia. Court records indicate Frank was a key figure in helping Colonia establish its weapons factories by contracting with German arms producers to assist the colony in setting up their operations. Alleged accomplices in Schäfer's crimes who were charged and awaiting trial fled Chile and took refuge in Frank's church in Germany, where they were protected from extradition. German protestors picketed in front of Frank's church to protest his actions. Schäfer and his compound were portrayed in the 2015 film Colonia.

In 2014, Robert Martin Gumbura, a leader of Branham's followers in Zimbabwe, was arrested and convicted for raping multiple women in his congregation. Gumbura and his followers were polygamous. Gumbura reportedly had relations with over 100 women. He died in prison in 2021.

In April 2023, government authorities discovered shallow graves where over 100 bodies were buried. The investigation is ongoing, and authorities believe more than 500 individuals may be buried in the graves. They had been allegedly starved to death by P. N. Mackenzie, a leader of Branham's followers in Kenya. Some had been buried alive, and authorities were able to rescue one who had been buried for three days. News reports labeled the group as the Malindi cult. Homicide detectives working the case said the group was radicalized by Branham's teachings, leading to their deaths. Investigators discovered some of the bodies were missing organs, and accused the cult of harvesting and selling the organs of the victims.

Polygamist followers of Branham's teachings have also been reported by news media in the United States for marriage to minors. Authorities have gone so far as to raid one church and threaten members with legal action for violating bigamy laws. Polygamy is a point of conflict among Branham's followers; not all groups accept the practice. Supporters of polygamy claim Branham authorized the practice in his 1965 sermon entitled "Marriage and Divorce".

Roberts Liardon commented, "According to Branham, since women introduced men to sex, polygamy was brought about. Women had to be punished. So men could have many wives, but women only one husband."

In 2020, Joaquim Gonçalves Silva, a prominent leader of Branham's followers in Brazil, was accused of raping multiple women. Sivas died while awaiting trial for his alleged crimes.

In 1997, the O'odham Nation in Arizona accused Wayne Evans of defrauding their tribe of over $1 million and giving that money to Voice of God Recordings. The tribe filed a racketeering case against them to recover their money. In 2001, Evans pleaded guilty to charges of embezzlement, and Voice of God Recordings returned the funds to the tribe.

Joseph Coleman, a follower of William Branham in the United States with influence over multiple churches, was connected to "a multi-million dollar fraud through an investment management company". News reported that Coleman's son had solicited over $20 million in funds under false claims. He and his fellow conspirators pleaded guilty in 2010 and in 2011 were sentenced to two years in prison and ordered to pay millions in restitution. The FBI reported that, "rather than using the investors' capital to support the two funds, the defendants used the vast majority of investor money to purchase lavish gifts for their friends and themselves".

In 2020, Vinworth Dayal, a minister who promoted Branham's teachings in Trinidad, was arrested and charged with money laundering through his church.

Pearry Green was a defendant in multiple criminal cases concerning his financial dealings. In a 2003 case, he pleaded guilty to theft of government property in U.S. District court.

In 2014, Pastor Donny Reagan made news in the United States for promoting Branham's racial teachings. Several news outlets labeled Reagan as the "most racist pastor in America." Kacou Philippe, a leader of Bramham's followers in Africa, was arrested in 2017 for hate speech and sentenced to one year prison after preaching in multiple African nations that blacks should be submissive towards whites. Philippe insisted decolonization of Africa was a sin, and that Africans could only prosper when in servitude to Europeans.

In 2017, street preachers promoting Branham in Canada began to make national news in the United States and Canada for their aggressive behavior. Their tactics prompted officials to pass legislation targeting their activities in 2019. They were arrested multiple times in both countries for harassing women for their appearance and disrupting church services. The CBC investigated Branham and focused their reporting on his connections to Jim Jones and the Ku Klux Klan and labeled Branham's followers a "doomsday cult". In 2021, they were reported in the news again as fugitives who were evading arrest after attacking women at a Presbyterian church in Canada.

In 2018, Pastor Théodore Mugalu, a leader of Branham's followers in the Democratic Republic of Congo encouraged his followers to violence against Catholics in his country. News reports claimed that Mugala's followers forced 145 priests and nuns to strip naked, cover their heads, and filmed their whippings.

In 2021, Steven Hassan's Freedom of Mind Institute published an article labeling Branham's followers a cult stating, "Branham's ministry was characterized by white supremacy and deeply misogynist attitudes." "The Message cult has always been deeply connected to white supremacy groups."

According to Hassan, Branham's followers use "deceptive tactics to recruit and indoctrinate unsuspecting people. Recruiters do not tell new members that the cult originated with deep ties to white supremacy groups." Hassan concluded by stating that "The Message churches have a significant following and an enormous potential to influence people and create violence."

== Bibliography ==
- Babinski, Edward T. (1995). Leaving the Fold: Testimonies of Former Fundamentalists. Prometheus Books. ISBN 978-1615921676.
- Basso, Carlos (2022). La Secta Perfecta (in Spanish). Penguin Random House Grupo Editorial. ISBN 9789566063650.
- Burkun, Michael (1997). Religion and the Racist Right: The Origins of the Christian Identity Movement. University of North Carolina Press. ISBN 978-0807846384.
- Dyck, Carl (1984). William Branham : The Man And His Message. Saskatoon: Western Tract Society. ISBN 9780919847002.
- Duyzer, Peter M. (2014). Legend of the Fall, An Evaluation of William Branham and His Message. Independent Scholar's Press. ISBN 978-1927581155.
- Enroth, Ronald M. (1992). Churches That Abuse. Zondervan Publishing House. ISBN 0310532906.
- Harrell, David (1978). All Things Are Possible: The Healing and Charismatic Revivals in Modern America. Indiana University Press. ISBN 0525241361.
- Kydd, Ronald A. N. (1998). Healing through the Centuries: Models for Understanding. Hendrickson Publishers, Inc. ISBN 0913573604.
- Larson, Bob (2004). Larson's Book of World Religions and Alternative Spirituality. Tyndale House Publishers. Inc. ISBN 084236417X.
- Liardon, Roberts (2003). God's Generals: Why They Succeeded And Why Some Fail. Whitaker House. ISBN 978-0883689448.
- Moriarty, Michael (1992). The New Charismatics. Zondervan. ISBN 978-0310534310.
- Niebuhr, H. Richard (1975). Christ and Culture. Harper & Row. ISBN 978-0061300035.
- Weaver, C. Douglas (2000). The Healer-Prophet: William Marrion Branham (A study of the Prophetic in American Pentecostalism). Mercer University Press. ISBN 978-0865547100.
