= Kyoko Ono =

Kyoko Ono Cox (b. August 8, 1963) is an American artist and writer.

== Early life and education ==
Ono Cox is the daughter of Yoko Ono and Anthony D. Cox, born in August 1963 in Tokyo, Japan. Her parents married two months earlier. Cox was the primary caregiver as Ono pursued being an artist. They divorced in 1969. In the documentary, One to One: John & Yoko, Ono sings the song, "Don't Worry Kyoko (Mummy's Only Looking For Her Hand In The Snow,)" which was released the same year.

In the wake of the divorce, Ono Cox's parents split custody. There were several incidents of Cox taking his daughter out of the country without informing Ono, who was in a relationship with John Lennon by then. In 1971, Cox was granted full custody of Kyoko, and moved into the Church of the Living Word, (also known as the Living Word Fellowship) with his wife, Melinda Kendall and Ono Cox. The Church was located in Kalona Iowa, and it was led by John Robert Stevens. Ono Cox was seven years old at the time.

Cox gave Ono Cox the alias "Ruth Hollman." Ono Cox told the Daily Mail that "Going into a cult was like the perfect place to go if you were scared of being tracked down by the FBI.…Nobody there gave a damn. They were in love with the cult leader and trying to read the Bible and do whatever the cult leader said and listen to his sermons.” She spent this part of her child doing chores such as husking on the Iowa farm. As a child, she asked her father repeatedly if she could see her mother.

Ono Cox went to Wheaton College, where she met her husband, Jim Helfrich. They married in 1992. Helfrich encouraged Ono Cox to reach out to her mother. When Ono Cox contacted her mother in 1994, she was a public school teacher in Colorado. Ono Cox told the New York Post by the time she had reunited with her mother, she "really understood kids and families better than my parents ever had. She wanted to see me right away and then we just started spending time together.”

== Personal ==
Ono Cox is based in Colorado. In 1992, Ono Cox married Jim Helfrich, divorcing in 2018, They have two children. Her half-brother is Sean Lennon.
