= Latter Rain (post–World War II movement) =

Christian Pentecostal movement

Latter Rain movement
- Classification: Pentecostal
- Origin: 1948; 78 years ago North Battleford, Saskatchewan, Canada

The Latter Rain, also known as the New Order or the New Order of the Latter Rain, was a post-World War II movement within Pentecostal Christianity which remains controversial. The movement saw itself as a continuation of the restorationism of early Pentecostalism. The movement began with major revivals between 1948 and 1952 and became established as a large semi-organized movement by 1952. It continued into the 1960s. The movement had a profound impact on subsequent movements as its participants dispersed throughout the broader Charismatic and Pentecostal movements beginning in the 1960s.

The Latter Rain Movement had its beginnings in the years following World War II and was contemporary with the evangelical awakening led by Billy Graham, as well as with the Healing Revival of Oral Roberts, Jack Coe, and William Branham. In the fall of 1947, several leaders of the small Pentecostal Sharon Orphanage and Schools in North Battleford, Saskatchewan, were inspired to begin a period of intense fasting and prayer for "outpourings of the Holy Spirit" after visiting one of Branham's healing campaigns in Vancouver, British Columbia, Canada. After weeks of fasting and prayer, the participants had ecstatic experiences and reported miracles. Later that year, groups organized large revival events, and news quickly swept across Canada and the United States, influencing many Pentecostal believers. The movement was deeply influenced by British Israelism and many of the movement's doctrines, including their interpretation of the "Latter Rain" prophecy, were based on parallels drawn between the church and Israel based on British Israel ideology.

Joseph Mattsson-Boze was an important leader of the movement and helped organize many revival conventions. He publicized the Latter Rain movement and its leaders in his Herald of Faith magazine in the 1950s and 1960s. Boze was instrumental in bringing the Independent Assemblies of God in the revival. The IAoG were key supporters of the Latter Rain movement and provided an early framework for the movement which emphasized the independence of the local church and opposed complex denominational structures. As the revival died down after a few years, those who had been swayed by the doctrine formed various loosely affiliated groups. William Branham, Ern Baxter, Sam Fife, John Robert Stevens, Paul Cain, Emanuele Cannistraci, Dick Iverson, Kevin Conner, Dick Benjamin, Leonard Fox, Violet Kitely, Reg Lazelle, David Schoch, George Evans, Charlotte Baker, Fuchsia Pickett, Jim Watt and others, were prominent ministries that influenced and were influenced by the Latter Rain.

The Latter Rain strongly emphasized relational networks over denominational structures. Latter Rain emphases are some of the most noticeable differences between Pentecostals and Charismatics, as delineated, for example, by the Assemblies of God USA in their 2000 position paper on end time revival. The Latter Rain movement was rejected by classical Pentecostal denominations. The broader Pentecostal movement began to strongly reject elements of the Latter Rain movement starting in the early 1950s, which caused significant discord and confrontations between participants in the Latter Rain and the leadership of older Pentecostal groups. The term Latter Rain increasingly became a pejorative label among the broader Pentecostal movement; therefore, many ministers who were influenced by the movement became reluctant to share their connections to the movement. Much of the movement, along with elements of the Healing Revival, integrated into parts of the larger Charismatic movement.

== History ==
=== Background ===
The late 1940s was a time Pentecostals considered "of deep spiritual hunger," as they were concerned about the declining operation of the gifts of the Spirit they claimed were once so evident when Pentecostalism began in the early 20th century. In response, about 70 students gathered in October 1947 in North Battleford, Saskatchewan, to begin the first term of the newly formed Sharon Bible College. Most were first-year students, but some were second and third-year students from the Pentecostal Bible College in Saskatoon.

From the latter part of October 1947 until February 1948, members of the school participated in daily fasting and prayer. Classes were suspended at times to encourage the movement which the majority of the school began to participate in. The students believed that God was about to do something new and unique for the church. Some students issued prophecies that urged others "to seek the face of the Lord". Some students reporting difficulty studying because of their intense motivation to pray and fast.

By day, the students labored to construct buildings to serve as new classrooms and gathered for prayer in the evenings, which included intercessory prayer, prophecy and fasting. Some fasted between three and forty days. At the time, the school consisted of three buildings at the North Battleford airport.

The group was led primarily by George Hawtin and Percy G. Hunt, two former pastors of the Pentecostal Assemblies of Canada, and Herrick Holt, a pastor of the Church of the Foursquare Gospel in North Battleford. They were later joined by George Hawtin's brother Ernest Hawtin, and brother-in-law Milford Kirkpatrick. The initial 70 Sharon School students had followed Hawtin and Hunt from Bethel Bible Institute in Saskatoon, where both had formerly taught. Hawtin had been asked to resign for lack of cooperation with the institute, and Hunt resigned in sympathy.

=== Initial revival (1948) ===
On February 11, 1948, a young woman prophesied "that we are on the very verge of a great revival, and all we have to do is open the door, and we could enter in." After the prophecy Pastor Hawtin prayed, "Father we do not know where the door is, neither do we know how to enter it."

A following prophecy described the open door as the doorway into the gifts and ministries in the Body of Christ. Then, the following day, the students began to have ecstatic experiences which were described as "the rain pouring down". One of the eyewitnesses, Ern Hawtin, brother of Pastor George Hawtin, reported the outpouring as the revival suddenly began in the largest classroom where the entire student body was gathered. One student claimed to experience a vision. Other students claimed they were under the power of God as they collapsed on the floor.

Some students knelt in worship and reported feeling in "deep awe of God". One claimed to be directed by God to lay his hands upon a student and pray for him. After doing so, he uttered a prophecy to the student. Then another lengthy prophecy was given by Ern Hawtin that the gifts of the spirit will be restored to the church to be received by prophecy and the laying on of the hands of the presbytery. Haltingly, the members of the school began to pray and lay hands on people, and there were reports of multiple healings as result of the prayers. Prior to this, the laying on of hands for this purpose was viewed as heretical and had not been practiced for several decades throughout Pentecostalism. Pastor G. Hawtin came to believe that the nine spiritual gifts had been restored to the Church.

Thomas Holdcroft wrote about the events:

In extended chapel services for four days... the procedure emerged of calling out members of the audience and imparting a spiritual gift to them by the laying on of hands accompanied by a suitable prophecy. The authorization and direction of these activities was a series of vocal prophetic utterances by both students and their teachers.

In the spring of 1948 on Easter weekend, special services were held which the school called the "Feast of Pentecost". Many people who had heard of the revivals in North Battleford attended these services. This led to what is considered the first "Camp Meeting" during July 7–18, 1948, which began drawing large crowds in the thousands.

The revival quickly spread across the country and the world and was joined by numerous churches and individuals. Glad Tidings Temple in Vancouver, British Columbia, became an important church that spread the message of revival around the world through her publications, tapes and missionaries worldwide and Bible schools in Vancouver, Taiwan, Mexico, the Arctic and in Uganda. The Philadelphia Church in Chicago became another important hub of the Latter Rain revival. Its pastor, Joseph Mattsson-Boze was a leading figure in the Independent Assemblies of God, whose denomination embraced the movement early on. Herald of Faith magazine began to print and publicize the events of the revival. Bethseda Missionary Temple in Detroit began interacting with the movement in December 1949 and became another important bastion of the movement. Franklin Hall, who published Miracle Word magazine, began participating in the movement in 1948.

=== Israel and the church ===
The Latter Rain movement was deeply influenced by British Israelism which impacted the development of some of the key teachings of the movement. The teachings from the revival came to be known as "Latter Rain" because its leaders began to connect the timing of the revival with the establishment of the State of Israel in May 1948. They believed their revival was a fulfillment of a prophecy of a coming "latter rain" by Joel the Prophet. The Latter Rain movement believes that the Church is the spiritual counterpart of Israel. They believe parallels exist between the history of Israel and the Church such that whenever Israel experiences restorative events, the Church similarly experiences a spiritual restoration.

In 1900, when the Zionist movement was seeking a homeland for the Jewish people in Palestine, it coincided with "a restoration of the Baptism of the Holy Spirit" at the Azusa Street Revival in 1906. In 1948 when the modern nation of Israel was established, they claim God restored the doctrine of the laying on of hands and praise through the Latter Rain Revival and raised up healing evangelists such as Branham and Oral Roberts. This teaching was widely promoted by Branham, Hawtin, Mattson-Boze, Ern Baxter, and many other prominent figures connected to the movement. In 1967, Israel won the Six-Day War and restored Jewish control over Jerusalem. The Latter Rain movement connected the event with the charismatic movement which it said was restoring the gifts of the spirit to the church. Groups influenced by and descended from Latter Rain have continued the pattern of connecting what they believe to be restoration events in church to restoration events for the nation of Israel.

George Warnock, a former personal secretary to Ern Baxter (an associate with William Branham's healing ministry), resided at Sharon Schools in the fall of 1949 and performed various work supporting the movement. Branham and Baxter both adopted many of the teachings that developed within the Latter Rain movement. Warnock's book, The Feast of Tabernacles (1951), discussed the role of Sharon Schools and affiliated groups in living out the completion of God's feasts for Israel, through perfection of the saints and their dominion over the earth. He described the Jewish feasts of Passover, Pentecost, and Tabernacles as ones that "pre-figure and typify the whole Church Age, beginning with the death of Jesus on the cross, and consummating in "the manifestation of the Sons of God" – the "overcomers" who will step into immortality and establish the Kingdom of God on earth."

=== Reaction from Pentecostal leaders ===
Some Pentecostal denominational leadership began to openly oppose the revival in the spring of 1948, and questioned the teachings and practices being developed by the movement. As the revival progressed, their condemnations became more pronounced. According to one author, "leaders of the Assemblies of God watched in horror" as the Latter Rain movement began to grant ministering licenses to unqualified preachers and viewed some of their teachings as divisive and harmful. For instance, the 1949 General Council of the Assemblies of God USA declared in its Resolution #7:

We disapprove of those extreme teachings and practices, which being unfounded scripturally, serve only to break fellowship of like precious faith and tend to confusion and division among members of the Body of Christ, and be it hereby known that this 23rd General Council disapproves of the so-called 'New Order of the Latter Rain'...

Bill Britton wrote that

in the restoration of the last days, we find certain men whose names are linked with the principles that were being revealed in their day... when we come to the time of the so-called "Latter Rain" revival of 1948–49 and the early '50s, the doctrine of "laying on of hands" (with prophecy) springs up, and we see ministries emerging into the national limelight as George and Ernie Hawtin, Myrtle Beall, Winston Nunes, Omar Johnson and many others.

During the early years, some of the most ardent critics of the Latter Rain and its theology came from within Pentecostalism, particularly the Assemblies of God. In 1949, the General Council of the Assemblies of God, following the leadership of its General Superintendent E. S. Williams, stated that pre-tribulation rapture represented correct eschatology. It rejected the Latter Rain practice of personal prophecy accompanied by the laying on of hands, as well as the Manifest Sons of God doctrine.

The Latter Rain strongly emphasized relational networks over organizational structure. Latter Rain emphases are some of the most noticeable differences between Pentecostals and Charismatics, as delineated, for example, by the Assemblies of God in their 2000 position paper on End Time Revival. The Latter Rain movement was rejected by classical Pentecostal denominations. The broader Pentecostal movement began to strongly reject elements of the Latter Rain movement starting by the early 1950s, which caused significant discord and confrontations between followers of Latter Rain and the older Pentecostal groups. The term Latter Rain increasingly became a pejorative label among the broader Pentecostal movement.

The movement widely influenced many prominent ministries. Some branches of the movement developed as cult-like groups, such Sam Fife and The Move, William Branham and The Message, and John Robert Stevens and The Walk. Other parts of the movement moderated the doctrine and ultimately had a widespread influence on the Charismatic and Pentecostal churches at large.

The Latter Rain movement ultimately led to major divisions within the Pentecostal denominations, especially the Assemblies of God. Stanley Frodsham, a noted Assemblies of God leader, left the Assemblies in favor of the Latter Rain. He noted that it had practices and experiences similar to the Azusa Street Revival, a founding element of the Pentecostal Church. The opposition of other Pentecostal denominations ultimately led to the withdrawal, under pressure, of Ivan Q. Spencer, founder of the Elim Fellowship, from inter-Pentecostal fellowship.

Contemporary criticism of the Latter Rain movement has emanated from fundamentalists such as John MacArthur, as demonstrated by their websites that attack the movement. Some identify the roots of more recent Charismatic trends such as Kingdom Now theology, the Kansas City Prophets including Paul Cain, and the New Apostolic Reformation including C. Peter Wagner as being rooted in the Latter Rain. The modern charismatic movement, while clearly influenced by some Latter Rain ideals such as the fivefold ministry and the laying on of hands, generally rejects the more extreme elements of Latter Rain theology, although even many charismatics argue that the New Apostolic Reformation wing of the movement are more heavily influenced by this theology.

A small, controversial branch of the Latter Rain is the "Reconciliation" movement, especially those who believe in "Manifest Sonship" theology. Reconciliation (also called ultimate or universal reconciliation) is a doctrine of Christian Universalism that acknowledges God's plan to save the whole world through the atoning sacrifice of Christ. According to this tradition, the manifest Sons of God are expected to reign on earth during a coming millennial age until ultimately every human being will be restored to harmony with God.

== Beliefs ==
Latter Rain proponents viewed themselves as a continuation of classical Pentecostalism and continued many Pentecostal teachings and practices. Latter Rain leaders viewed Pentecostalism as spiritually dry in the post-war period and in danger of slipping into a dry or mental formalism like many of their evangelical peers. Latter Rain leaders developed new doctrines and practices to address the developing formalism with Pentecostalism. These changes made the Latter Rain Movement distinct from the classical Pentecostals. The Latter Rain influenced a new style of leadership structure, worship, and a different doctrinal emphasis that was significantly different from traditional Pentecostalism.

The Latter Rain brought a new focus on the spiritual elements of Christianity, including personal prophecy, typological interpretation of Scripture, the restoration of the five-fold ministry, and a different eschatological emphasis. George Warnock's Feast of Tabernacles outlined some of these emphases, and is widely quoted as an early distillation of the teachings.

"Leaders of the movement taught that the Christian Church must restore and equip a “five-fold ministry” which included modern-day apostles, prophets, evangelists, pastors, and teachers. Then, while appointing key individuals to these roles, the movement presented the idea that mainstream Christianity had become apostate and needed purging."

=== Eschatology ===
The Latter Rain broke with the historic dispensationalism which had become entrenched in the ranks of Pentecostalism, which they believed tended to be pessimistic and apocalyptic in its outlook. The Latter Rain emphasized a victorious eschatological outlook. Rather than attempting to save a few souls before the rise of the anti-Christ, the Latter Rain emphasized the Church as overcoming and victorious, relating that it would come into "full stature" as taught by the Apostle Paul.

The term Latter Rain stems from Bible passages such as Jeremiah 3:3, 5:23–25, Joel 2:23, Hosea 6:3, Zechariah 10:1, and James 5:7. The idea of a latter rain was not new to Pentecostals. It was present from the earliest days of Pentecostalism, which believed that the reappearance of speaking in tongues and the baptism of the Holy Spirit marked the "latter rain of God's Spirit." It was believed that these were signs of the coming end of history. The outpouring of the Holy Spirit on Pentecost had been the "former rain" that established the Church, but the current "move" of the Spirit was the latter rain that would bring the Church's work to completion and culminate in the imminent Second Coming of Jesus Christ.

=== Manifested Sons of God and Joel's Army ===
A major feature of Latter Rain teaching focused on the "manifestation of the Sons of God" or "Joel's Army". The Latter Rain movement leaders taught that as the end of the age approached, the manifested sons of God would appear in the church. They would be empowered with supernatural gifts and able to perform miracles comparable to the miracles ascribed to Jesus Christ in the New Testament. These Manifest Sons of God, ones who have come into the full stature of Jesus Christ, would receive the Spirit without measure.

The basic premise of the teaching developed shortly after the initial revival, and the teaching evolved rapidly and in alternate ways among the different groups participating in the movement. The various branches of the movement debated the nature and extent of this manifestation. Some branches believed only a limited number would achieve this status, but others believed all participants in the revival could experience it. In most groups, the focus on obtaining the "stature of Christ" quickly became a key teaching of the movement, but the groups varied widely in defining just what the "stature of Christ" entailed.

Some branches of the movement, believed they would be as Jesus was when he was on earth and would receive a number of divine gifts, including the ability to change their physical location, to speak any language through the Holy Spirit, and to perform divine healings and other miracles. Thus empowered, they would complete the work of God, restoring man's rightful position as was originally mandated in Genesis. By coming into the full stature of Christ, they would use their newfound powers to usher in his millennial reign through the creation of a theocratic system of government. Extreme versions of this interpretation referred to Jesus as a "pattern" Son, and believed that believers would become identical to Jesus in every way. They applied the "ye are gods" passage (Psalms 82:6) to validate their belief.

The manifested sons theology is also deeply connected with Fivefold ministry thinking, and played an important role in shaping the way these teachings were viewed by subsequent movements. Early leaders used Ephesians 4 to develop the idea that the manifestation of the sons of God could only be achieved through the leadership of specially endowed preachers operating as a "five-fold" ministry. In practice, this led to the creation of a strongly authoritarian leadership structure where members were required to submit themselves to the direction of their leaders for life guidance, decision making, and discipline. The five-fold ministry views featured especially strongly in the Shepherding Movement, which transmitted the concepts into the Charismatic Movement.

Dominion Theology emerged from manifested sons of God concepts and has been described in the 21st century as a "rapidly growing apocalyptic movement," prophesied to become an "Armageddon-ready military force of young people who will love not their life unto death, who will stand face to face with the incarnation of satan as the antichrist and his army in the end of the age."

=== Ecclesiology ===
The "Sacrifice of Praise" and the restoration of the Tabernacle of David were important themes within the Latter Rain. Dancing, lifting of hands and spontaneous praise are marks of this movement. An effort was made to show the error of many Christians who denied that such practices were imperative for believers.

A major theme of the Latter Rain was "unity" among the believers in the church service, the geographic region, and at large. The unity beliefs began to develop after the mainstream Pentecostal denominations began to reject their movement and take steps to distance themselves from the Latter Rain teachings and practices. Blaming the denominations for stopping what they perceived to be a move of God, Latter Rain proponents began to strongly condemn and reject denomination structures as incompatible with unity. They taught that God saw the Church organized not into denominations but along geographical lines, as in the book of Acts—one Church but in different locations. They expected that in the coming "last days," the various Christian denominations would dissolve, and the true Church would coalesce into citywide churches under the leadership of the newly restored apostles and prophets.

The Latter Rain taught that there would be a restoration of the five ministerial roles mentioned in Ephesians 4:11: apostle, prophet, evangelist, pastor, and teacher. They believed that the foundational roles of apostle and prophet had been lost after the time of the first apostles due to the Dark Ages. They thought that God was restoring these ministries in the present day. These ideas are part of the "prophetic movement" and "New Apostolic Reformation".

Belief in the restoration of the offices of apostle and prophet distinguished the Latter Rain Movement from the rest of Pentecostalism. Classical Pentecostals viewed the five ministerial roles as functions and gifts vested in the entire Spirit-baptized congregation at large, subject to the leading of the Spirit, and not gifts which operated solely at the discretion of one gifted individual.

=== Pneumatology ===
Pentecostals traditionally held that the baptism of the Holy Spirit usually comes after prolonged "tarrying" or waiting for the Spirit. By contrast, the Latter Rain movement taught that the baptism of the Holy Spirit and the gifts can be imparted from one believer to another through the laying on of hands.

A participant in services at Bethesda Missionary Temple in Detroit, Michigan described the discerning of gifts:

During the day men of God, who have been called to various offices by the Lord, as they feel led by the Spirit, call out of the congregation folks whose hearts have been made ready, lay hands upon them and set them apart for God. This laying on of hands is accompanied by various prophecies relative to their ministries and gifts of the Spirit that God has bestowed upon them.

== Leaders ==
The following list includes some representative leaders of various branches, both past and present; it is not exhaustive.

=== Founders ===
- Maria Fraser founded the Latter Rain Mission in South Africa as a secession of the Apostolic Faith Mission of South Africa 1927/1928, but this is generally considered a different movement from what developed in North America.
- Reg Layzell founded Glad Tidings church in Vancouver, British Columbia; he is an author and influenced such books as The Key of David and Unto Perfection.
- George Warnock wrote The Feast of Tabernacles (1951) which became very influential for its view of the biblical feasts and approach to the Scriptures. One identifiable mark of those influenced by the Latter Rain is their spiritual hermeneutic.
- George Hawtin and his brother Ern Hawtin were early leaders and evangelists in the movement, who traveled to spread the word.
- A. Earl Lee was one of the fathers of the movement in southern California. He had previously been involved with the preacher Aimee Semple McPherson.
- Myrtle D. Beall was the founder and Senior Pastor of Bethesda Missionary Temple in Detroit, Michigan until her death in 1979.
- J. Preston Eby was an early proponent; he resigned under pressure from the Pentecostal Holiness Church in 1956 because his Latter Rain beliefs were not approved by the church.
- Thomas Wyatt, a pastor from Portland, Oregon, hosted the North Battleford men at a pastor's conference, thus enabling the spread of the doctrine.
- Garlon and Modest Pemberton were the pastors of a significant Latter Rain church in Houston.
- Charles E. Green founded Word of Faith Temple in New Orleans, Louisiana, which grew to over a thousand members. The church is still in existence today, and is known as Life Gate Church. Charles Green's son, Michael, pastors Life Gate Church.

=== Ministers Fellowship International ===
Ministers Fellowship International (MFI) is the most prominent direct descendant of the Latter Rain movement and one that is considered mainstream in theology. It founded Portland Bible College in Portland, Oregon, which is a leading institution in the Latter Rain tradition. Many of the books used by Latter Rain churches are textbooks created for Portland Bible College and written by its original teachers. These books include Present Day Truths by Dick Iverson and many by Kevin Conner. City Bible Publishing carries many contemporary books that define the movement. Kevin Conner's Tabernacle of David and Present Day Truths are classics on worship and restoration.

MFI's leadership includes many significant figures from the early years of the movement.

- Dick Iverson, founder of Mannahouse Church (formerly Bible Temple and City Bible Church) and Portland Bible College, served as the apostolic overseer of Ministers Fellowship International (MFI). That role within MFI is now held by Jonathan Wilkins. The Senior Pastor of Mannahouse Church is currently Derrill Corbin.
- Kevin Conner, an influential Bible teacher in the Latter Rain; he blended some of the new ideas with more traditional hermeneutics. He influenced T. D. Jakes and other ministers.
- David Schoch was associated with this branch of the Latter Rain and was an honorary member of the apostolic board of MFI until his death in July 2007. The church he led is now known as City At the Cross in Long Beach, California.
- Violet Kiteley founded Shiloh Christian Fellowship in Oakland, California. David Kiteley, was co-founder of Shiloh, and is now Pastor Emeritus and an original member of the MFI leadership. Melinda Ramos and Javier Ramos, David's daughter and son-in-law are pastors of Shiloh Church and members of the MFI leadership team.

=== Others ===
- Bishop Bill Hamon of Santa Rosa Beach, Florida, has been influential in the Charismatic movement. Hamon's book The Eternal Church outlines the movement, noting his presence.
- Dr. Philip Wiley, of Rustburg, Virginia, Bread of Life Ministries International, School of the Bible, reflects the teachings of George Warnock's Feast of Tabernacles.
- Dr. Kelley Varner (1949–2009) of Richlands, North Carolina, had a teaching ministry influenced by the Latter Rain, which he acknowledged in his books.
- John Gavazzoni, Kenneth Greatorex, Gary Sigler and Robert Torango are charismatic Christians who teach universal reconciliation and sonship (a version of the ancient Christian doctrines of apocatastasis and theosis). Gavazzoni and Greatorex are leaders of Greater Emmanuel International Ministries. Sigler runs a large website called Kingdom Resources. Torango leads a church and evangelistic ministry in Tennessee.
- Tony Salmon, of West Virginia, is founder and vice president of Kingdom Ministries. Salmon has been an active proponent of and spokesman for the teachings of sonship and reconciliation.
- Charles Schmitt, pastor of Immanuel's Church in Silver Spring, Maryland, and founder of the Body of Christ movement, spent time in the Latter Rain.
- Bill Britton is an author and teacher on sonship.
- Paul N. Grubb and his wife, Lura, of Faith Temple in Memphis, Tennessee, were also sonship proponents.
- Wade Taylor co-founder (along with Bill Britton) of Pinecrest Bible Training Center in Salisbury Center, New York.
- Robin McMillan, a former pastor of the lead fellowship of Rick Joyner's MorningStar Ministries, was mentored by Wade Taylor. MorningStar itself is very reflective of a Latter Rain ideal.
- Glenn Ewing and his son, Robert Ewing, of Waco, Texas, trained Jim Laffoon, leading prophet for Every Nations.

=== Other movements and institutions ===
- Elim Fellowship and its college, Elim Bible College in New York, were the focus of much Latter Rain activity.
- Destiny Image Publications, founded by Don Nori, who was a prophet in a Latter Rain church before founding the publishing house. The company prints titles by Varner, Joyner, Hamon and others.
- The Independent Assemblies of God, International, organized by A. W. Rasmussen.

== Bibliography ==
- Hollenweger, Walter (1972). The Pentecostals. London: SCM.
- Moriarty, Michael (1992). The New Charismatics. Zondervan. ISBN 978-0-310-53431-0.
