= Leo Mercer =

Cult leader and Christian minister

- Born: 1937; South Bend, Indiana
- Died: 1978 (aged 40–41)

Leo Mercer (1937–1978) was a cult leader and Christian minister. He was connected to the Healing Revival of the 1940s and 1950s and was closely associated with William Branham. Mercer was raised near South Bend, Indiana and was a member of the Catholic Church before converting to Pentecostalism around 1950.

== History ==
Mercer became the leader of a cult commune in Prescott, Arizona known as The Park. Mercer was a follower and promoter of the teachings of Branham. Branham helped launch and popularize Mercer's ministry beginning in the 1950s. Mercer spent several years traveling with Branham as a member of his healing campaign team. He was initially responsible for making and selling recordings of Branham's sermons, but his role grew and he served as one of Branham's publicists in the last years of Branham's ministry. Mercer wrote many articles for Joseph Mattsson-Boze's Herald of Faith magazine promoting William Branham and his own ministry. Mercer and his partner Gene Goad were frequent companions of William Branham's on his hunting trips.

Mercer successfully convinced many people to join him in his commune, because they thought he was a disciple of Branham. The members of the commune were beguiled from William Branham's followers in Canada, West Virginia, Michigan, Illinois, Kentucky, Georgia, Kansas, and Indiana. There were about 130 members in 1967.

Mercer physically and sexually abused children and adults at the commune. One former commune member, Keith Loker, committed a murder prompting authorities to investigate the commune and its history in 2008. In a California court case, authorities discovered that "Mercer gradually became more authoritative, employing various forms of punishment. He would ostracize people from the community and separate families. Children were beaten for minor infractions like talking during a march or not tying their shoes. Mercer would punish girls by cutting their hair, and force boys to wear girls’ clothing. There was also evidence that Mercer sexually abused children." Many adult members of the community participated in the abuse ordered by Mercer. Some children never recovered from the psychological abuse suffered.

"In one instance, Mercer ordered that [a girl's] hair be cut off to punish her because he had had a vision from God that she was being sexually inappropriate with young children. [She] was beaten and forced to wear masculine clothes that covered much of her body, hiding her bruises. Her fingertips were burned so she would know what hell felt like." Mercer sexually abused both children and adults. Survivors reported that they subjected themselves to Mercer's abuses because of direction they received personally from Branham.

The abuses began before William Branham died, and were ongoing when he visited the commune during the 1960s. Conditions worsened after William Branham's death as Mercer's drug usage increased. The ritual he created for men to show their loyalty to him required them to place their hands on his genitals and swear an oath. Most male members of the commune were forced into sexual acts with Mercer. In 1975, Mercer was accused of financial abuse for stealing funds from a local business. The same year, many members of the commune decided to leave. Most members undertook efforts to cover up the abuse that occurred. Mercer died in Arizona in 1978.

== Sources ==
- Harrell, David (1978). All Things Are Possible: The Healing and Charismatic Revivals in Modern America. Indiana University Press. ISBN 0-525-24136-1.
- Weaver, C. Douglas (2000). The Healer-Prophet: William Marrion Branham (A study of the Prophetic in American Pentecostalism). Mercer University Press. ISBN 978-0-865-54710-0.
