= Douglas Weaver =

Douglas Weaver may refer to:

- Doug Weaver (Douglas W. Weaver) (born 1930), American football player and coach
- Doug Weaver (author) (C. Douglas Weaver), American author and professor of religion
