= Christianity Magazine =

Christianity Magazine may refer to:

- Christianity Magazine, a theology journal now published as Premier Christianity
- Christianity Magazine (Churches of Christ), a defunct magazine produced by preachers in the non-institutional Churches of Christ in the United States
