= Franklin Hall (minister) =

American Christian minister and faith healer

C. Franklin Hall (October 4, 1907 - January 13, 1993) was an American Christian minister and faith healer. Born in Coffeyville, Kansas to Carey F. Hall and Alice M. Hall, he was the oldest of six children. He was a prominent minister in the Healing Revival during the 1940s and 1950s, a well known author in the Pentecostal movement, and an important leader in the Latter Rain movement. His teachings on fasting were particularly influential in the Latter Rain movement. Hall founded Miracle Temple in San Diego in 1946, where he established the Fasting and Prayer Daily Revival Center. In 1956 Franklin moved his headquarters to Phoenix, Arizona, where he established the International Healing Cathedral and the Hall Deliverance Foundation. Hall did missionary work in Africa and was particularly active in Nigeria during the 1970s. Hall was a lifelong member of the Assemblies of God.

Hall developed several teachings, related to fasting and healing that impacted many of his contemporaries. He believed in a "body-felt salvation," an early 20th century mid-western term for physical healing, wherein the fire of the Holy Spirit was fully applied to a person in a spiritual sense, would by faith protect the individual from all sickness, and even exhaustion through prayer and fasting as many Christians have claimed. He also claimed that those who fully experience salvation could be free from body odor through long term fasting. Hall also taught that Christians can raise the dead based on actual medical reports, testimonies, and scriptural teaching.

== Sources ==
- Harrell, David (1978). All Things Are Possible: The Healing and Charismatic Revivals in Modern America. Indiana University Press. ISBN 0-525-24136-1.
