= WFJ =

WFJ may refer to:

- Washington for Jesus, a series of demonstrations in Washington, D.C., U.S.
- Watford Junction railway station, England
- Willard F. Jones (1890–1967), American naval architect and business executive
