= Half-A-Room =

Conceptual artwork by Yoko Ono

Half-A-Room, MOMA, 1967.

Half-A-Room is a 1967 conceptual artwork by the Japanese artist Yoko Ono.

== Work ==
The work is made from various objects that have been cut in half and painted white. It was made with the help of Ono's second husband, Anthony Cox, and some local art students. The piece was first displayed at Ono's "Half-a-Wind" exhibition (also called "Yoko Plus Me") at the Lisson Gallery in West London in 1967. At the Lisson Gallery show the objects were accompanied by a row of glass bottles on a shelf with each bottle containing the words "Half a X" for each cut up object to represent their respective missing halves. The names in bottles was suggested by John Lennon, with Ono recognizing his contribution semi-anonymously with the inclusion of the label "J.L." underneath the bottles.

The installation in Ono's 2014 exhibition at the Guggenheim Museum in Bilbao contained:

- Half-a-Suitcase
- Half-a-Radio
- Half-a-Picture
- Half-a-Heater
- Half-a-Chair
- Half-a-Bookshelf
- Half-a-Garbage Can
- Half-a-Sauce Pan
- Half-a-Tea Pot
- Half-a-Hat
- Half-a-Tea-Kettle
- Half-a-Measuring Cup
- Half-a-Sack
- Half-a-Basket of Flowers
- Half-a-High Heeled Shoe
- Half-a-Man's Shoe
- Half-a-Strainer
- Half-a-Plastic Cup
- Half-a-Scrub Brush
- Half-a-Utensil
- Half-a-Compact
- Half-a-Plastic Soap Holder
- Half-a-Glasses Case
- Half-a-Globe Holder
- Half-a-Glass Jar
- Half-a-Drinking Glass
- Half-a-Dresser

Half-a-Room was shown at Ono's exhibition from 10 November 2007 to 4 February 2008 at the Centro Cultural Banco do Brasil in São Paulo .

== History ==
The work was shown at Ono's 1967 Half-a-Wind exhibition at the Lisson Gallery in Paddington, London, from 11 October to 14 November 1967. The cost of the exhibition was underwritten by John Lennon. Ono had been to see Lennon's friend Pete Shotton, who was working for The Beatles company Apple Corps, and had asked to borrow a few thousand pounds to fund the exhibition. Shotton told Ono that he "really not authorised to hand out two thousand quid like that" but upon asking Lennon, Shotton said that he "merely grunted the affirmative without further comment". Lennon later described the exhibition as all "beautifully cut in half and painted white...That was our first public appearance, but I didn't even go and see the show, I was too uptight".

== Interpretation ==
Half-A-Room has been described by Ono as a response to her feeling at the time that "there was a half empty space in my life" as a result of the increasing estrangement of her and her second husband, Anthony Cox. Ono awoke one day and noticed that Cox had not returned from a night out, and so the bed was half empty, and through this realised that there was "a half empty space in my life". The magazine Another Magazine wrote in 2015 that the piece "speaks to the pointlessness of material things without the human connection that gives them meaning; the result is a pure, painful representation of heartbreak that takes the breath away." The emotional impact of the end of her relationship with Cox subsequently inspired Ono to make her piece Ceiling Painting/Yes Painting.

In the accompanying exhibition text Some Notes on the Lisson Gallery Show, Ono wrote that "I think of this show as an elephant's tail. ...Life is only half a game. Molecules are always at the verge of half disappearing and half emerging. Somebody said I should also put half-a-person in the show. But we are halves already. It is sad that the air is the only thing we share. No matter how close we get to each other, there is always air between us. It is also nice that we share the air. No matter how far apart we are, the air links us". In an audio guide recorded for Ono's 2015 retrospective at the Museum of Modern Art in New York City, Ono said that "You see a room with little – a space between it. Instead of a room that's packed, you know, it has air between there. ...In those days, I still didn't have a life of just being alone. And then I thought, "This is a great one for a work of art to show to people that we're just half." Anyway, everything that I see here, the other half is invisible. And that other half may be something that we might see one day, but now we don't see it".
