= Homer Hailey =

American preacher and author (1903–2000)

- Born: August 12, 1903; Marshall, Harrison County; Texas, USA
- Died: November 9, 2000 (aged 97); Tucson, Pima County, Arizona
- Occupations: Churches of Christ clergyman Professor at Abilene Christian University and Florida College
- Spouse(s): (1) Lois Estelle Manly Hailey (married 1930-1954, her death) (2) Widna Neeley Kirby Hailey (married 1955-1997, her death)
- Children: Roma Luceil, Mary Lois, Homer Rob, Charles Dennis, and Carol Ann

Homer Hailey (August 12, 1903 – November 9, 2000) was an American preacher in the churches of Christ in the 20th century, a professor at Abilene Christian University and Florida College, and the author of at least fifteen theological books. He was well known for his general biblical knowledge, especially the Old Testament.

Hailey and the churches of Christ are the topics of the book The Churches of Christ in the 20th Century: Homer Hailey's Personal Journey of Faith by David Edwin Harrell, Jr. Most of Hailey's books are still in print. Audio recordings of his sermons and classes are available through TruthOnDisc.Net

Homer Hailey was born outside Marshall in Harrison County in East Texas, the oldest child of Robert Thomas Hailey and the former Mamie Collins. His brothers and sisters were Rob, Ruth, Jack, Roy, and Mary Ida. On December 20, 1930, in Abilene, Texas, he married the former Lois Estelle Manly (1907–1954). They had five children: Roma Luceil, Mary Lois, Homer Rob, Charles Dennis, and Carol Ann. After Lois' death, he married the former Widna Neeley Kirby (1917–1997) on October 4, 1955. Hailey died in 2000 at the age of ninety-seven in Tucson, Arizona.

In 2000, Harrell, a professor emeritus of religion at Auburn University in Auburn, Alabama, published The Churches of Christ in the Twentieth Century: Homer Hailey’s Personal Journey of Faith (University of Alabama Press, 2000). Harrell alternates chapters between an historical look at an issue or conflict within the first century of the Churches of Christ and the way in which Homer Hailey responded to that issue or conflict. The plain-spoken Hailey who had memorized nearly every verse in the Bible became Harrell's touchstone for the history of the churches of Christ in the 20th century.

In 2001, Alvin Jennings, owner of Star Bible Publications and a student in Homer Hailey's 'Denominational Doctrines' class in 1949, preserved Hailey's polemic style class notes which gave his reasons that led him out of the churches which offer instrumental music. Hailey reviewed the old hectograph outlines and refined them for publication.

As a child, Homer Hailey lived outside Marshall, Texas. The night Lady Bird Taylor - the future First Lady - was born, her brothers spent the night at the Hailey house, with their friends Homer and Rob.

== Bibliography ==
- Attitudes And Consequences in the Restoration Movement: Our Heritage From The Pioneers ISBN 1584273348
- Carrying out the Great Commission - According to the New Testament Pattern published by Religious Supply Inc. (142 pgs.)
- Commentary on Daniel: A Prophetic Message, A ISBN 978-0913814529
- Commentary on Isaiah: With Emphasis on the Messianic Hope, A
- Commentary on Job: Now Mine Eye Seeth Thee, A
- Commentary on the Minor Prophets, A
- From Creation to the Day of Eternity: God's Great Plan for Man's Redemption
- God's Judgments and Punishments: Individuals and Nations
- Hailey's Comments. Volumes One and Two
- Internal Evidences of Christianity: Outline Studies
- Let's Go Fishing For Men
- Messiah of Prophecy to The Messiah on the Throne, The
- Minor Prophets-spokesmen of God: A Study Workbook for Teachers and Students, The with Robert Harkrider
- Mormonism
- Notes on Mormonism
- Prayer and Providence
- Revelation: An Introduction and Commentary
- That You May Believe: Studies in the Gospel of John ISBN 978-0801040788
  - Hailey, Homer (1973). That you may believe; studies in the Gospel of John. Grand Rapids: Baker Book House. ISBN 0-8010-4078-7.
- The Divorced & Remarried Who Would Come To God (Nevada Publications, 1991, 75 pages)
- The Edomites: The Symbol of the World (Religious Supply, Inc., 1998, 117 pages)
- Mechanical Instruments of Music In Worship Today: Detailed Outline of 1949 Class at Abilene Christian University (Star Bible Publications, 2001, 31 pages, ISBN 1-56794-234-2)
  - Alvin Jennings; Hailey, Homer (2001). MECHANICAL INSTRUMENTS OF MUSIC IN WORSHIP TODAY - Detailed Outline of Class at Abilene Christian University. Star Bible Publications. ISBN 1-56794-234-2.

== Sources ==
- David Edwin Harrell Jr., The Churches of Christ in the Twentieth Century: Homer Hailey’s Personal Journey of Faith, University of Alabama Press, January 11, 2000, 352 pages, ISBN 0-8173-1008-8, ISBN 978-0-8173-1008-0
