= Myrtle Beall =

Myrtle Dorothea Monville Beall, sometimes M. D. Beall or Mom Beall (1896 - 1979) was an American Pentecostal leader.

Born Myrtle Monville into a Roman Catholic family in Hubbell, Michigan, Beall converted to the Methodist Church upon her marriage. She went on to have three children. Later she moved to Detroit, where in the 1930s she experienced baptism of the Holy Spirit; she knelt in the kitchen of her home one day and promptly began speaking in tongues. Soon she opened a Sunday school, and later began the Bethesda Missionary Temple. Beall said that in 1939, God revealed plans to her to "build an armory" where "soldiers" could be prepared to do battle for Christianity. As a result, her church, which had contained 350 seats, was expanded to hold 3,000 instead. Beall began broadcasts from the Temple in the 1940s, and made it the center of the Latter Rain Movement. Her group split with the Assemblies of God in 1949. By the end of her career Beall could be heard speaking on radio broadcasts three times a day. She was succeeded as leader of the movement by her son James in the 1970s.
