= Kevin Conner =

Australian Pentecostal theologian (1927–2019)

Kevin J. Conner
- Born: 6 February 1927; Carlton, Victoria
- Died: 18 February 2019 (aged 92); Melbourne, Victoria
- Occupations: Theologian, author, minister
- Spouses: Joyce Conner (died 1990) Victorene (Rene) Marie Arrowsmith (m. 1992; died 2018)
- Writing career
- Subject: Theology
- Website: kevinconner.org

Kevin J. Conner (February 6, 1927 – February 18, 2019 ) was a Pentecostal theologian who was formerly the senior minister of Waverley Christian Fellowship (now CityLife Church) in Melbourne, Australia. Conner is the author of nearly 60 books and has taught nationally and internationally at many churches, conferences and bible colleges.

== Biography ==
Born in Melbourne, Australia in 1927, Conner became a Christian at the age of 14, and served in the Salvation Army until the age of 21. From 21, he became a pastor for a number of years.

In 1972, he moved to Portland, Oregon, USA to serve with Dick Iverson at Bible Temple (now City Bible Church), where he taught for a number of years.

Conner studied at Southwest International College (San Antonio, Texas) and Southern California Theological Seminary (San Diego, California).

In 1981, he returned to Australia and from 1986–1995 pastored Waverley Christian Fellowship.

== Teaching ==
Conner was dean of Portland Bible College in the 1970s and is recognised as one of the leaders of the Latter Rain Movement. His books appear in prestigious bible college libraries across the world (including Harvard Divinity School and Princeton Theological Seminary) and are used as textbooks at a number of colleges.

Conner's significant contributions to theology and teaching are recognised by missions and teaching organisations such as Ministers Fellowship International, "These textbooks have gone into over 80 countries and have become great resources for Ministers, teachers, preachers and Bible college students" and Global Harvest Ministries

== Personal life ==
Kevin Conner was married to his late first-wife Joyce, and later to his late second wife Rene. His daughter, Sharon is married to Frank Damazio, who is now senior minister of City Bible Church in Portland. His son, Mark Conner, was formerly the senior minister of CityLife Church.

== Published works ==
- Conner, Kevin J.; Malmin, Kenneth P. (1975). Old Testament Survey. City Bible Publishing. ISBN 0-914936-21-2.
- ——— (1980). Foundations of Christian Doctrine. City Bible Publishing. ISBN 0-914936-38-7.
- ——— (1982). A Scriptural Thesis on Water Baptism. City Bible Publishing. ISBN 0-949829-04-8.
- ———; Malmin, Kenneth P. (1983). Interpreting the Scriptures. City Bible Publishing. ISBN 0-914936-20-4.
- ——— (1988). Interpreting the Symbols & Types. City Bible Publishing. ISBN 0-914936-51-4.
- ——— (1988). Biblical Principles of Leadership. City Bible Publishing.
- ——— (1988). Epistle of Jude. City Bible Publishing.
- ——— (1988). Foundational Principles of Church Membership. City Bible Publishing.
- ——— (1988). Headship, Covering (Hats) & Hair. City Bible Publishing.
- ——— (1988). Interpreting the Scriptures – Study Guide. City Bible Publishing.
- ——— (1988). Marriage, Divorce & Remarriage. City Bible Publishing.
- ——— (1995). Interpreting the Book of Revelation. City Bible Publishing. ISBN 0-914936-10-7.
- ———; Malmin, Kenneth P. (1998). New Testament Survey. City Bible Publishing. ISBN 9780914936121. OCLC 503016996.
- ——— (1999). L'Eglise du Nouveau Testament. Tome II. Macon. ISBN 2-910141-23-3.
- ——— (2001). Book of Revelation – An Exposition. City Bible Publishing. ISBN 0-949829-48-X.
- ——— (2002). Book of Hebrews: the book of Christ's eternal priesthood (the order of Melchisedek). City Bible Publishing. ISBN 0-949829-56-0.
- ——— (2003). El Tabernáculo de Moisés. Buenos Aires, Argentina: Peniel. ISBN 987-557-003-6.
- ——— (2004). Book of Daniel, an Exposition. City Bible Publishing. ISBN 0-949829-91-9.
- ———; Malmin, Kenneth P. (2005). Le défi de l'herméneutique : un manuel expliquant comment on interpréte la Bible. Longueuil, Québec: Éditions Ministéres multilingues. ISBN 2-89576-049-7.

- Messages from Matthew (City Bible Publishing 1988) ISBN
- Methods & Principles of Bible Research (City Bible Publishing 1988) ISBN
- Ministries in the Cluster (The Ministry Team) (City Bible Publishing 1988) ISBN
- Ministry of Women (with Joyce Conner) (City Bible Publishing 1984) ISBN 0-949829-07-2
- Mystery Parables of the Kingdom (City Bible Publishing 1996) ISBN 0-949829-29-3
- New Covenant Realities (City Bible Publishing)
- Only for Catholics who believe, love and serve our Lord Jesus Christ (City Bible Publishing)
- Restoration Theology (City Bible Publishing)
- Restoring the church: principles of church life by Bill Scheidler, Dick Iverson and Kevin J Conner (Bible Temple Publishing, Portland, Oregon 1976) ISBN 0-914936-23-9
- Restoring the family: principles of family life by Dick Iverson and Kevin Conner (Bible Temple Publishing, Portland, Oregon 1979) ISBN 0-914936-35-2
- Table Talks (City Bible Publishing)
- The Book of Acts: early church history and the ministry of the Holy Spirit (City Bible Publishing 1992) ISBN 1-886849-02-1
- The Christian Millennium: Studies in eschatological millennial views (City Bible Publishing 2000) ISBN 0-949829-49-8
- The Church in the New Testament (Sovereign World, Chichester, England 1989) ISBN 1-85240-023-4
- The Church of the Firstborn and the Birthright (City Bible Publishing 1990) ISBN 0-949829-23-4
- The Covenants (with Ken Malmin) (City Bible Publishing 1983) ISBN 0-949829-02-1
- The Death-Resurrection Route (City Bible Publishing)
- The Epistle to the Romans: A Commentary (City Bible Publishing 1999) ISBN 1-886849-13-7
- The Feasts of Israel (City Bible Publishing 1980) ISBN 0-914936-42-5
- The Foundations of Christian Doctrine – Study Guide (City Bible Publishing)
- The House of God which is the Church (City Bible Publishing)
- The Kingdom Cult of Self (City Bible Publishing 1993) ISBN 0-949829-24-2
- The Ministry of Women (City Bible Publishing)
- The Name of God (City Bible Publishing 1975) ISBN 0-914936-15-8
- The Passion Week Chart (City Bible Publishing)
- The Relevance of the Old Testament to a New Testament Church (City Bible Publishing 1986) ISBN 1-901007-22-7
- The Seventy Weeks Prophecy: an exposition of Daniel 9 (Acacia Press, Blackburn, Victoria 1983)
- The Tabernacle of David (City Bible Publishing 1990) ISBN 0-914936-94-8
- The Tabernacle of Moses (City Bible Publishing 1975) ISBN 0-914936-93-X
- The Temple of Solomon (City Bible Publishing)
- The Three Days & Three Nights (City Bible Publishing)
- The Vision of an Antioch Church (City Bible Publishing)
- This We Believe (City Bible Publishing)
- Tienden en offers : christelijk rentmeesterschap (translation by Heddie Gritter) Stichting Hij Leeft, Zevenhuizen 1996 ISBN 90-802974-1-0
- Tithes and Offerings (City Bible Publishing)
- To Drink or Not to Drink, New Expanded Edition (City Bible Publishing 2003) ISBN 0-949829-97-8
- To Smoke or Not to Smoke? (City Bible Publishing)
- Today's Prophets: New Testament teaching on today's prophets (City Bible Publishing 1990) ISBN 0-914936-68-9
- Understanding & Distinguishing the New Birth & the Baptism of the Holy Spirit (City Bible Publishing)
- Kevin J. Conner's Life & Ministry Journey (Audio)
