= CityLife Church =

Church in Melbourne, Australia

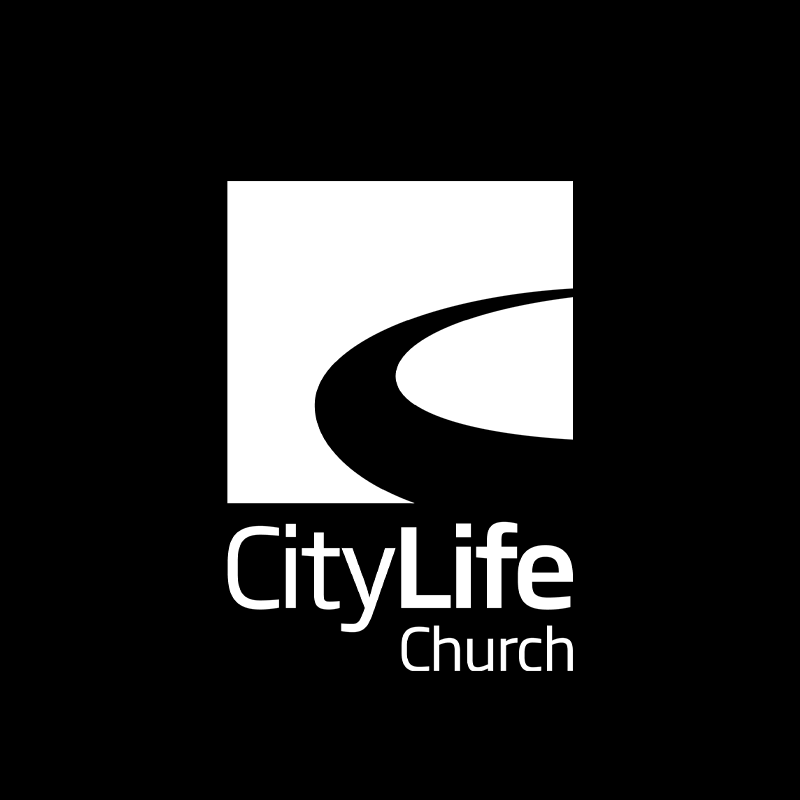
- CityLife Church
- Location: Wantirna South, Victoria_{(Knox - main campus)}
- Country: Australia
- Denomination: Pentecostal
- Website: citylife.church

History
- Former name(s): Waverley Mission, Waverley Christian Fellowship
- Founded: 1967
- Founder: Richard J Holland

Clergy
- Pastor(s): Godwin Shim _{(Senior Minister)} Michael Grechko _{(Knox Campus)} Amanda Saenz _{(Casey Campus)} Rob Nyhuis _{(Manningham Campus)} Reuel Vun _{(Melbourne City Campus)} Sam Grimshaw _{(Whittlesea Campus)} Ben Warwick _{(Beveridge Campus)} Virginia Wong _{(Chinese Congregations)}

CityLife Church is a multi-site, Pentecostal Megachurch located in Melbourne, Australia, with weekly services at their campus locations in the localities of Knox, Casey, Manningham, Melbourne CBD and Whittlesea. Weekly services are also held in Mandarin and Cantonese at the Knox site. In 2004, CityLife was the largest church in Melbourne and second-largest in Australia. It has a strong emphasis on gathering in small groups called life groups. Its leadership team is headed by Senior Minister, Godwin Shim.

== History ==
The church was established as Waverley Mission in 1967 by Richard Holland. In 1981, the church name was changed to Waverley Christian Fellowship and the following year, Parkmore Full Gospel Church and its Christian school (now Waverley Christian College) merged with it. In 1986, Kevin Conner became Senior Minister of the church (then about 600 members). Then in 1995, Mark Conner, Kevin's son, was appointed Senior Minister, and during his time as Senior Minister, the Church grew to over 10,000 congregants. In February 2017, Mark Conner handed over the senior minister role to Andrew Hill.

In April 2019, Andrew Hill resigned as Senior Minister and was succeeded by Andrew Chisholm, who served until July 2026. Godwin Shim was appointed Senior Minister, with the transition formalised during services on 18–19 July 2026.

In April 2006, CityLife Church Casey was established, followed in March 2008 by CityLife Church Manningham. On 18 November 2013, Open House Christian Fellowship in Whittlesea joined with CityLife to become CityLife Church Whittlesea.

Today, CityLife is a multisite strong church. CityLife plays host to over 10 services across Melbourne between all their campus locations.

== Ministries ==
CityLife has a children's church program (CityLife Kids), a youth ministry every Friday, (EPIC Youth), and a Young Adults ministry.

CityLife Church also runs CityLife Community Care which provides a range of community services including counselling services, health-related services, emergency accommodation and other courses and support programs.

The church runs Waverley Christian College, a Christian school with over 1700 students at campuses in Wantirna South and Narre Warren South.

== Other activities ==
In 2015, CityLife apologised for distributing leaflets to students at a local public high school. Images of the leaflets obtained by The Daily Mail contained assertions as "If a woman becomes physically close and hugs a guy for 20 seconds it will trigger the bonding process, creating a desire to be near him" and "the more partners you have, [sic] the harder it is to bond to the next".

In 2018, it was reported that CityLife-operated counseling centres had facilitated gay conversion therapists.
