= Paul Cain (minister) =

American minister (1929–2019)

Paul Cain (June 16, 1929 – February 12, 2019) was a Christian minister involved with both neo-charismatic churches and the Charismatic Movement, and is named one of the Kansas City Prophets. Cain resided in California and ministered monthly at a local church in Santa Maria, California until his death.

== Early life ==
Paul Cain was born on June 16, 1929, in Garland, Texas. He claimed that his mother Anna had been seriously ill with cancer, tuberculosis, and other difficulties, and was not expected to live giving birth. However, fellow pastor R. T. Kendall has said that there is "no way to verify" the claim.

Anna Cain went on to live to 104, before her death in 1990. Mike Bickle, a friend of Paul Cain, claimed that Anna had given the scripture Luke 14:8 while on her deathbead before dying at 4:18pm on 18 April (4/18). This story was used to lend legitimacy to both the prophesies of Paul Cain and the International House of Prayer. However, Anna's death certificate shows that she actually died at 9:50 p.m. on April 19, 1990.

Cain attributed his and his mother's survival to an angelic visitation his mother had at that time, and to the fervent prayers of his family. He claimed that during this visitation, an angel told his mother to name him 'Paul' and that he would be a minister. Cain claimed that he had received angelic visits from age eight.

== Career ==
=== Early ministry ===
Cain first started in the healing movement as a teenager. He went on to become part of the Latter Rain movement in the 1950s and travelled with faith healer William Branham, a key figure in the healing revival in America. He also travelled throughout America without Branham, purporting to be a faith healer and holding his own meetings. Branham was close enough with Cain that he trusted him to attend meetings in Europe on his behalf after Branham said he was told not to go by an angel.

As other ministries linked to Branham began to close in the 1950s, Cain claims a supernatural encounter led him to close his ministry, after which point he didn't preach for close to 30 years.

=== Later ministry ===
Cain re-emerged as a minister in 1987 after joining the charismatic Kansas City Fellowship (which would later become part of Vineyard). In 1988 he went on to meet the one of the founders of the Vineyard movement, John Wimber. The two men's relationship was mutually beneficial. Cain gave Wimber advice on the Vineyard churches and Wimber showcased Cain to a greater audience, including an appearance on Christian TV show The 700 Club. Wimber credited Cain with saving Vineyard. Cain viewed Wimber in a messianic light, saying he would "lead the church of Jesus Christ into the greatest season of harvest and manifestation of power and glory and righteousness that the world has ever known."

During this era, Cain also ministered with the International House of Prayer and Mike Bickle. Bickle encouraged Cain to prophesy in front of the International House of Prayer congregation.

Cain visited Iraq to meet with Saddam Hussein during the Clinton administration. He called Hussein a "very interesting man" and called for diplomacy in the region.

After emerging as a prophetic minister, Cain claimed to have predicted, among other things, the election of Bill Clinton and the death toll of the 1989 Loma Prieta earthquake, though neither of these predictions were publicly reported before the events in question. Cain's predictions also frequently focused around the end times.

=== 2004 controversy and subsequent 'restoration' ===
In April 2004, Rick Joyner, Jack Deere, and Mike Bickle, three ministers who had long-held, close ministerial relationships with Cain, confronted him about a homosexual relationship and about his alcoholism. Cain admitted to both allegations and the three ministers began a restoration process. In October of the same year after Cain began to resist the restoration process, Joyner, Deere, and Bickle then went public with the allegations, citing Matthew 18:15–17. Deere claims that at this time Cain threatened to ruin their respective ministries if they continued the process.

In February 2005, Cain stepped down from ministry. He also posted a letter of confession on his website, excerpts of which appeared in Charisma Magazine. He said, "I have struggled in two particular areas, homosexuality and alcoholism, for an extended period of time." He pledged to undergo another process of restoration. In November 2006, Cain once again stopped the restoration process and "returned to his sins", according to a blog post from the same time.

In January 2007, David Andrade declared Cain to have been restored, and to be ready to minister again freely. This decision was questioned by Rick Joyner, Jack Deere, and Mike Bickle. Deere posted a statement saying that they lacked confidence in his rehabilitation, did not consider him restored, and therefore believed his return to ministry premature.

=== Allegations of faking revelations ===
In Sam Storms's 2026 book The Rise and Fall of the Kansas City Prophets, there is a previously unpublished allegation from Jack Deere that Cain had faked supernatural revelations and admitted as such to him.

We learned that he had a genealogical program on his computer. One of the things he was famous for was getting the address of a person and the names of their relatives. He mixed this information in with genuine supernatural revalation about healing, and he admitted this deceit to us.

== Personal life ==
Cain was at one time engaged to be married, but claimed he saw a vision of Jesus appearing in his car next to him and told him to remain single and celibate. He said that afterwards he prayed to God to remove his sexual desire.

Later in life, Cain lived in Santa Maria, California and ministered monthly at a local church until the time of his death.

== Bibliography ==
- Hanegraaff, Hank (2001). Counterfeit revival. Nashville: Word Pub. ISBN 978-1-4185-1480-8.
