= Elim Bible College =

College in Lima, New York

Coordinates: 42°54′30.2″N 77°36′48.9″W

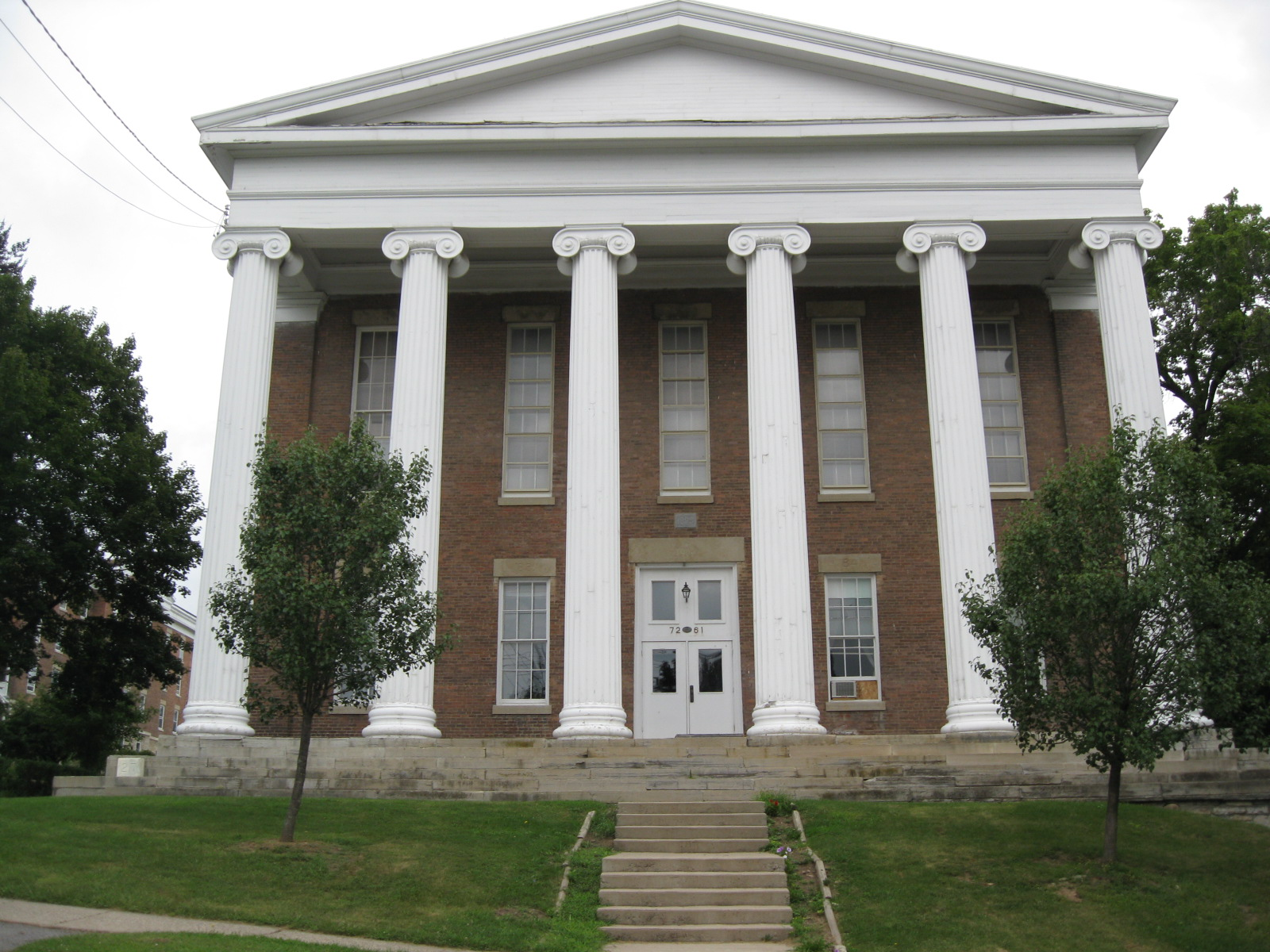
- Former names: Elim Bible Institute, Elim Bible Institute and College
- Type: Private college
- Established: 1924; 102 years ago
- Founder: Ivan Q. Spencer
- Accreditation: TRACS
- Religious affiliation: Christian
- President: Fred Antonelli
- Provost: Danuta Case
- Faculty: 4 full-time and 29 part-time and adjunct (2023)
- Students: 98 (2023)
- Location: Lima, New York, United States
- Campus: 75 acres (30 ha); Small-town
- Language: English
- Colors: Blue, white, orange
- Mascot: Judah the Lion
- Website: elim.edu

Elim Bible College is a private Christian college in Lima, New York. It awards bachelors degrees in theology and business management, an associate degree, and one-year certificates.

== History ==
Elim was founded in 1924 in Endwell, New York, by Ivan Quay Spencer and Minnie Spencer. The school is named for a biblical location found in Exodus 15:27, wherein Elim is described as an oasis in the wilderness.

In the 1920s, the school moved to Rochester and Red Creek and then in 1932 to Hornell, where it was located until 1951 when it moved to its current site in Lima, which formerly had been the campus of the site of Genesee Wesleyan Seminary.

Beginning in 1948, Elim was a center for the Latter Rain Movement in Pentecostalism.

For most of its history, Elim was not accredited and awarded certificate diplomas rather than degrees. In 2020, the school was accredited by the Transnational Association of Christian Colleges and Schools.

As of January 27, 2025, the school was officially renamed Elim Bible College.

== Academics ==
Elim Bible College offers accredited degree programs including a Bachelor of Science in Theology, a Bachelor of Science in Business Management, an Associate of Applied Science in Biblical and Theological Studies, and an Associate of Applied Science in Business Administration. In addition to the degree programs, Elim also offers the accredited one-year Launch Certificate program and the less-rigorous and unaccredited Spiritual Enrichment Certificate program.

== Campus ==
The Elim campus in Lima was originally the site of Genesee Wesleyan Seminary of the Methodist Episcopal Church, which opened in 1831 as one of the first coeducational schools in the United States, constructing the buildings now known as College Hall and Spencer Hall in the Greek Revival style. Genesee College was founded on the same campus in 1849 as an expansion of the seminary. The two institutions shared the campus until 1870 when Genesee College relocated to Syracuse, where it became the basis of Syracuse University. The seminary continued to occupy the campus until it closed in 1941.

Shortly thereafter, the National Youth Administration (NYA), a New Deal project championed by Eleanor Roosevelt, briefly made the campus the location for one of the NYA's experimental resident work centers. The center provided vocational training to underprivileged students until its closure in the summer of 1942.

The Methodist Church operated a new Genesee Junior College at the site from 1947 to 1951, when Elim Bible Institute bought the 75-acre (300,000 m^{2}) campus and buildings for $75,000. Two campus buildings, Genesee Wesleyan Seminary, and Genesee College Hall, were listed on the National Register of Historic Places in 1976.

== Leadership ==
- Ivan Spencer (1924–1949)
- I. Carlton Spencer (1949–1983) son of Ivan Spencer who also led Elim Fellowship for many years
- H. David Edwards (1983-1988)
- Michael Webster (1988-1994)
- Paul Johansson (1994–2006) – student at Elim from 1956 to 1959
- Jeff Clark, Class of 1978 (2006–2012)
- Michael Cavanaugh, Class of 1976 (2012–2020) – founder of Elim Gospel Church, now Elim Life Church
- Fred Antonelli (2020–present)

== Related religious organizations ==
Elim Fellowship was formed in 1933 as an informal fellowship of churches, ministers, and missionaries originating from a nucleus of people who had attended the Elim Bible Institute. The incorporated Fellowship continues to support Pentecostal and Charismatic churches, ministers, and missions, providing credentials and counsel for ministers, encouraging fellowship among local churches, sponsoring leadership seminars, and also serving as a transdenominational agency sending missionaries and other personnel to other countries.

Elim Life Church, formerly Elim Gospel Church, an interdenominational Full Gospel church, was established neighboring the Elim campus in 1988 and is attended by a significant number of the College's faculty and students.

== Notable alumni ==
- Paul Schenck, anti-abortion activist and religious leader
- Rob Schenck, co-founder of the anti-abortion activist group Operation Rescue. His activism was motivated by their exposure at Elim to the teachings of theologian Francis Schaeffer, whose then-recent book A Christian Manifesto encouraged evangelicals to engage in political activism to combat secular humanism.
- Randall Terry (class of 1981), co-founder of the anti-abortion activist group Operation Rescue and Constitution Party nominee for the 2024 United States presidential election
- Robert Heisner, Christian evangelist, pastor, an participant in the onset of the Kingdom Bound ministries, founder of the Warriors of the Sword karate ministry and the Bushido Kai karate style.
