= Apostolic-Prophetic movement =

US-based Christian movement

The Apostolic-Prophetic movement (AP movement) is a US-based Christian movement founded in the early 2000s, primarily consisting of non-denominational alliances of independent churches and ministries.

The AP movement is rooted in the Charismatic movement, and is active in the Charismatic, Pentecostal, Third-Wave and prophetic groups. The movement believes in restoring elements of what it calls the five-fold ministry, based on Ephesians 4:11-13. Apostles, prophets, evangelists, pastors, and teachers are considered legitimate offices of the church and are seen as prayer warriors, responsible for ushering in the return of Jesus and the Kingdom of God through prayer.

== History ==
Around the time of the Second Great Awakening, leaders like Joseph Smith introduced the concept of the restoration of living prophets and apostles to guide religious movements in the US. The Church of Jesus Christ of Latter-day Saints in particular grew substantially over the next century, and its members recognized many prophets and apostles over that time. Much later, the modern movement quickly spread among evangelicals through the use of early mass-marketing techniques by megachurches and religious corporations. Early 20th-century movement leaders were Paul Cain and Bill Hamon. Hamon introduced the idea of a coming prophetic movement and was instrumental in establishing prophets of that movement, especially in the form of the Elijah company of prophets, and activating and training Christians in prophetic ministry. John Eckhardt and C. Peter Wagner were prominent figures in pioneering and propagating the movement. After the apostles began to propagate, many of them appeared throughout the US and other countries.

The majority of ministers and members of the movement came from former Charismatic movement churches. The ministry took the form of Bible preaching and prophesying. Hundreds of prophets went to other countries and prophesied to national leaders. Hector Torres claims that the apostles manifested signs and wonders, and that the saints were taught divine healing and the working of miracles. The local and global apostolic order was established based on the five-fold ministry concept. Church planting was done and people began to work for "the unity of the Church, the restoration of all things, and the promotion of the Kingdom of God."

=== New Apostolic Reformation ===
Hamon and Wagner worked together in propagating the movement. Hamon had the original vision for the restoration of apostles and Wagner acted as a theologian who began to write and designated the types of apostles and their functions. Their movement was called the New Apostolic Reformation (NAR).

Wagner, former professor of Church Growth at Fuller Theological Seminary of World Mission, founder of Global Harvest Ministries, presiding apostle and founder of the International Coalition of Apostles, and co-founder of World Prayer Center, played a pivotal role as the leading apostle of the movement from the 1980s to the 2000s.

Wagner provided key differences between the NAR and traditional Protestantism in his article The New Apostolic Reformation Is Not a Cult. He noted that those participating in the movement believe the Apostles' Creed and adhere to orthodox Christian doctrine.

=== Seven Mountain Mandate ===
According to believers, the five-fold ministry was initially restored and applied to religious centers, whereby ministers were seen to emerge to equip and raise up devout believers in God. The movement is now working on becoming more prevalent across various parts of society, under the Seven Mountain Mandate. The seven parts which the name refers to, and which the movement wishes to claim for God are religion, family, education, government, media, arts and entertainment, and business.

The movement's goal is to have more devoted Christians working effectively across society. On Patricia King's Extreme Prophetic TV, prophet Lance Wallnau states: "the Seven Mountains are almost a template for spiritual warfare because the church so frequently does not have a language for how it goes about taking territory."

In Bill Hamon's 2010 book Prophetic Scriptures Yet to Be Fulfilled, he describes the transformation of the seven mountains of culture, and how every nation will become either a sheep or a goat nation. In the end, the restoration of all things spoken of by the apostles and prophets will supposedly release Jesus to return and set up His domain over all the earth, as written in the Book of Acts, chapter three.

In essence, the movement is attempting to restore the church to the same power, energy, and fullness of faith as the Early Church. As more teachers, prophets, and apostles are trained, the movement is planning on establishing apostolic centers in various cities, as training centers for equipping and motivating believers to be ready for ministry and the works of transformation across the seven mountains of society. These centers are not pastoral churches or denominational institutions, but are regarded by the movement as being part of a marketplace ministry that is led and governed by local ministers. The goal is to achieve change in cities and nations, verified by standard social scientific measuring equipment and independent professional sociologists, as stated by Wagner in his book, The Church in the Workplace.

=== Kansas City Prophets ===
Some of those who shaped the current AP movement were based in Kansas City, Missouri, and became known as the Kansas City Prophets. They originated in the late 1980s and early 1990s at Kansas City Fellowship (KCF) whose influence eventually became international. It was overseen by KCF's Pastor Mike Bickle. Included in the list of prophets were Bob Jones, Paul Cain, Bill Hamon, Larry Randolph, James Goll, Jill Austin, and John Paul Jackson. John Wimber provided some oversight from the Vineyard Movement during the first few years. Cain had participated in the Healing Revival initiated by William Branham during the 1950s. The prophets except Bickle have left Kansas City but continue to be active in ministry throughout North America. Some Said It Thundered was written and published in 1991, during what is considered to be the height of their movement. A later book, A Life and Legacy of Pat Bickle and a History of the Kansas City Prophets, also contains notes on their history.

=== Apostolic Roundtable ===
The Apostolic Roundtable was a society of 25 apostles convened by Wagner that included Karl A. Barden, Bob L. Beckett, W. Rice Brookes, Emanuele Cannistraci, Gregory Dickow, Michael P. Fletcher, Chuck Pierce, Ché Ahn, Harold Caballeros, Naomi Dowdy, John Eckhardt, Bill Hamon, Jim Hodges, John P. Kelly, Lawrence Kennedy, Lawrence Khong, David Kwang-Shin Kim, Larry H. Kreider, Alan Langstaff, Roberts Liardon, Dexter Low, Mel Mullen, Alistair Petrie, and Eddie Villanueva.

== Beliefs and creeds ==
The movement has grown out of the Christian Charismatic movement and emphasizes the concept of the Holy Spirit. It is wide and varied, although some churches follow the Apostles' Creed, Nicene Creed, and Athanasian Creed. Some individual churches only hold to the Nicene Creed and have parted with what they call "historical Christianity".

The movement emphasizes the importance of Christians going into spiritual warfare at three levels, described as the ground level, person-to-person actions such as praying for each other's personal needs, the occult level, dealing with "demonic forces" released through occult activities, and the strategic or cosmic level, which involves "bind[ing] and bring[ing] down spiritual principalities and powers that rule over governments." The strategic level makes use of spiritual mapping to engage in spiritual warfare against territorial spirits, demons controlling specific regions.

== Apostolic networks ==
Apostolic networks are non-denominational alliances of independent churches and ministries. Apostolic networks are among the fastest growing movements in the modern Christian world.

=== Network of Christian Ministries ===
In July 1982, while guest speakers at Emanuele Cannistraci's church, Evangel Christian Fellowship, Bishop John Gimenez (founder of Rock Church and Washington for Jesus), Charles Green, and Mel Davis, along with Cannistraci, conceived the idea to form the Network of Christian Ministries (the Network), which was a major apostolic network formally established in 1984 in Washington D.C. By 1989, most of the national leaders of the charismatic movement had joined the Network.

The Network was founded by Cannistraci, Gimenez, Green, Davis, Paul Paino, Thomas Reid, David Schoch, Dick Iverson, Bob Weiner, and John Meares. Other prominent ministers on the board of governors included Kenneth Copeland, Charles Simpson, Ken Sumrall, Charles Blair, and Roderick Caesar, Sr.

The twelve national leaders and apostles, called the Apostolic Presbytery, were from all parts of the full gospel charismatic movement and were representatives of the movement. The twelve apostles included Cannistraci, Green, Paino, Caesar, Iverson, Simpson, Sumrall, Dick Benjamin, John Hagee, John Casteel, and Houston Miles. The leaders met as a larger congress of elders and board of governors "to address issues confronting the church and society." The apostles were recognized as national leaders that were truly representative of the myriad of Christian fellowships across the country.

The Network started a national movement that united leaders from diverse fellowships, denominations, and ministries across the nation. Thousands of ministers across the US were invited to be part of the Network, whose purpose was to unify and strengthen the Church. Its constitution also included the power to establish churches, missions, schools, colleges, and hospitals, to train chaplains for government and military service, and to set up an affiliated political action committee. The Network spread internationally as ministers in other countries joined it.

At the 1989 convention in Anaheim, there was a collective appeal from younger ministers for mentorship to pass on the elders' "reservoir of knowledge", "giftings", and "legacy" to the "next generation of world changers". The Network ultimately disbanded as it was unable to adapt to the appeal for mentorship.

=== Other networks ===
- The Antioch Network of Churches and Ministries (Evangel Christian Fellowship, San Jose, California)
- Antioch Churches and Ministries, exemplifies how apostolic teams resolve issues in contrast to denominational structures
- Apostolic Missions International
- The International Fellowship of Faith Ministries (2,000 churches)
- International Convention of Faith Churches & Ministries (495 churches; headquarters in Tulsa, Oklahoma)
- Faith Christian Fellowship International (1,000 ordained ministers)
- National Leadership Conference (represents other networks)
- Fellowship of Christian Assemblies (101 churches)
- Harvest International Ministries (HIM) (ministries and organizations in over 65 nations)
