= Ivan Q. Spencer =

Ivan Quay Spencer (November 28, 1888 – August 17, 1970) was an American Pentecostal minister who founded Elim Bible Institute (now Elim Bible College) and the Elim Fellowship.

Two collections of his writings, Faith: Living the Crucified Life and Daily Seedings: A Devotional Classic for the Spirit-Filled Life, were published posthumously in 2008. He is also the subject of Ivan Spencer: Willow in the Wind, a 1974 biography by Marion Meloon.
