= Robert Martin Gumbura =

Zimbabwean Christian pastor (died 2021)

Gumbura in an undated photograph

Robert Martin Gumbura (July 1956 – 7 August 2021) was a Zimbabwean religious leader and the pastor of the RMG Independent End Time Message Church in Zimbabwe.

== Biography ==
Gumbura was a practitioner of polygamy.

Gumbura's estate was lavishly furnished. News media reported there were about 400 members of his church. Gumbura lived at the compound with his eleven wives, thirty children, and other members of his church congregation. Gumbura was arrested and charged with nine counts of rape and possession of illegal pornographic material in 2013. He was cleared on four counts of rape, and was convicted of four counts of rape and one count of possession of pornographic material on 31 January 2014. Testimony at the trial alleged that he had claimed he had the right to have sexual intercourse with any woman in his congregation, and news reports stated he had relations with over 100 women in the church and that he treated the women of the church as "his personal property" and would "loan out" the women to other men in the church. He was initially sentenced to 50 years in Chikurubi Prison, but ten years were suspended from his sentence for good behavior, resulting in an expected sentence of 40 years. His church was also suspended by Zimbabwe's religious body, the Apostolic Christian Council of Zimbabwe (ACCZ).

On 18 March 2015, vice president and justice minister Emmerson Mnangagwa told the Parliament of Zimbabwe that Gumbura was one of more than 100 inmates involved in the planning of a violent riot over food that broke out at the prison on 13 March.

Gumbura died on 7 August 2021, from complications of COVID-19 at the Chikurubi Prison in Harare.
