= Leslie Elaine Perez =

American politician and convicted murderer

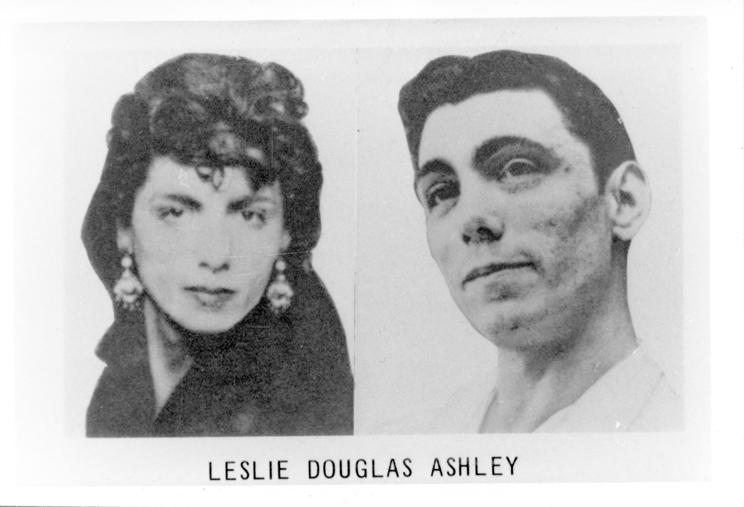

FBI Ten Most Wanted Fugitive

Description
- Born: Leslie Douglas Ashley; January 3, 1938
- Died: July 28, 2005
- Gender: Transgender woman
- Occupation: LGBTQ Activist

Status
- Convictions: Murder with malice
- Penalty: Death; commuted to life imprisonment
- Added: April 6, 1965
- Caught: April 23, 1965
- Number: 211
- Captured

Leslie Elaine Perez (January 3, 1938 – July 28, 2005), born Leslie Douglas Ashley, was an American political activist and prostitute who was convicted for the murder of Fred Tones, a Houston-based real estate broker, with Carolyn Lima. Lima and Perez were both working as prostitutes at the time of the murder. Following a 1963 mass meeting in Houston headlined by William Branham to appeal for clemency, Perez's sentence was stayed and she was declared legally insane by a federal judge after she told authorities she was the return of Elijah the Prophet.

Perez was a transgender woman. Beginning in the 1970s, she became a leader in the gay community of Houston and involved in Democratic politics in the United States, being elected secretary of a local LGBTQ+ organization and running for Democratic Party leadership twice.

== Murder case ==
Tones' body was found on February 6, 1961, the same night that Lima and Perez arrived at Tones' office for a prearranged threesome; Lima and Perez had been engaging in paid sexual activity with Tones since December the previous year. During a negotiation on February 6, Lima and Perez say that Tones struck the pair with a bayonet. When Perez refused Tones' requests for anal sex, he became agitated. When engaging in anal sex with Lima, Tones began "tearing at her private parts". Lima began to cry out, causing Perez to intervene; Tones then began to hit and strangle Perez, who grabbed a pistol from Lima's purse and began to shoot. When Tones grabbed his bayonet and tried to attack Lima and Perez, Lima grabbed the pistol and shot Tones five more times.

Tones' body was later found dead with six bullet wounds on him, his body burned with gasoline. Lima and Perez evaded police and FBI investigators, who were investigating the pair on charges of capital murder. They were later apprehended by the FBI in New York City. Legal claims of self-defense made by the pair were rejected in court. On May 24, 1962, they were found guilty of murder and sentenced to death (Lima would have been the first woman legally executed in Texas in almost a century).

Perez was the step-child of Full Gospel Business Men Association leader James Ayers. Ayers organized a mass meeting and prayer vigil held in Houston on March 4, 1963, to appeal for the pardon and release of Perez and Lima. William Branham headlined the event speaking on behalf of Lima and Perez and requesting the government show clemency for the pair. On March 29, Federal Circuit Judge John Robert Brown issued stays of execution four hours before the pair were scheduled to be killed, and the Fifth Circuit Court of Appeals later ruled that the prosecution had suppressed evidence in favor of the pair. Perez told authorities that she was the return of Elijah the Prophet. Brown cited the psychiatric reports and deemed Perez to be legally insane. Lima was later sentenced to five years in prison and Perez was declared insane and sent to a psychiatric hospital in San Antonio.

== Escape from hospital, further developments ==
Perez later escaped, spending six months on the run as "Bobo the Clown" and was on the FBI's "Most Wanted" list before being apprehended by the FBI. She was later tried again and sentenced to 15 years imprisonment. She served five and was released.

A transgender woman, Perez underwent gender confirmation surgery in 1971 after she was released on parole. She later became active in gay politics in Houston, becoming the Secretary of the Gay and Lesbian Political Caucus, and effectively took over the local ACT UP group alongside her mother Sylvia Ayres. She also ran two times for the chair of the Harris County Democratic Party and came in second to Ken Bentsen Jr. (1990) David Mincberg (1994), losing in run-off elections. Her selection of "Perez" (taken from a former lover's name) was considered controversial, as many at the time said it was responsible for her support among the local Hispanic population.

By the end of the 1990s, Perez left the Democratic Party.

== Death ==
Perez died on July 31, 2005.
