= Christianity Magazine (Churches of Christ) =

Religious magazine

Christianity Magazine was a magazine produced by certain preachers within the non-institutional Churches of Christ. The magazine was published on a monthly basis. Its editors were Dee Bowman, Paul Earnhart, Ed Harrell, Sewell Hall, and Brent Lewis. It began in 1984 and ceased publication in December 1999 producing 176 issues.
