= Elim Fellowship =

Pentecostal revival fellowship

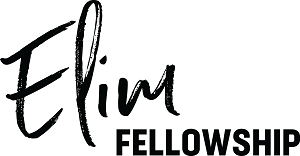
- Logo of Elim Fellowship
- Classification: Protestant
- Orientation: Finished Work Pentecostal
- Origin: 1924
- Official website: elimfellowship.org

Elim Fellowship is a Finished Work Pentecostal denomination of Christianity. It was founded in 1933 in Lima, New York, United States. It is named for a biblical location named in Exodus 15:27, wherein Elim is described as an oasis in the wilderness.

Elim Fellowship's headquarters is located at 1703 Dalton Road, Lima, New York, US and it has churches across the US and Canada.

== History ==
old Elim Fellowship logo

Elim Bible Institute was founded in 1924 by Reverend Ivan Q. Spencer and his wife Minnie Spencer in Hornell, New York. The Spencers had a vision to train ministers to work in revival and renewal movements.

The Elim Fellowship began a few years later in 1933 as the Elim Ministerial Fellowship, an informal fellowship of ministers who had graduated from Elim Bible Institute. In 1947, this loose network was incorporated as Elim Missionary Assemblies. In 1972 the name "Elim Fellowship" was officially adopted.

Elim, describes itself as a "worldwide revival fellowship", and works to serve, support, and network pastors, missionaries, churches, and other ministers and ministries.

The Elim Fellowship of Evangelical Churches and Ministers in Canada was incorporated in 1982.

== Beliefs ==
According to the denomination's official Statement of Faith, Elim Fellowship believes that;

- the Holy Bible is the divinely inspired word of God;
- that God exists eternally as one being of three co-equal persons;
- that humankind is lost and in need of a savior;
- that eternal salvation comes through the atoning death of Jesus Christ and spiritual regeneration by the Holy Spirit;
- that divine healing is provided through atonement;
- and that the personal bodily return of Jesus Christ is imminent.

The fellowship describes itself as being "of Pentecostal conviction and Charismatic orientation". Church government is congregational. The decision making body of the fellowship is the Council of Elders. New elders are chosen by the existing elder body and affirmed in annual session.

The Elim Fellowship holds membership in the Evangelical Council for Financial Accountability, the National Association of Evangelicals, Pentecostal/Charismatic Churches of North America, and the International Pentecostal Association.

== Colleges/institutes ==
- Elim Bible College - Lima, New York
- Elim Bible Institute - Buffalo - Orchard Park, New York

== Bibliography ==
- Encyclopedia of American Religions, J. Gordon Melton, editor
- Handbook of Denominations in the United States, by Frank S. Mead, Samuel S. Hill, and Craig D. Atwood
- Ivan Spencer, Willow in the Wind, by Marion Meloon
