= Anthony D. Cox =

American film producer (born 1937)

- Born: 1937 (age 88–89); United States of America
- Occupations: Film producer, art promoter
- Spouses: Yoko Ono (m. 1962; ann. 1963) (m. 1963; div. 1969); Melinda Kendall (m. 1970; div. 1977)
- Children: 1

Anthony D. Cox (born 1937) is an American film producer and art promoter. He was married to artist Yoko Ono from 1963 to 1969.

== Biography ==
Cox met Yoko Ono in 1961, after he saw some of her art work in an anthology and located her in Tokyo, Japan. The couple married on November 28, 1962, but the marriage was annulled on March 1, 1963, due to Ono neglecting to finalize her divorce from her first husband, the Japanese composer Toshi Ichiyanagi. They remarried on June 11, 1963, two months before their daughter, Kyoko Ono Cox, was born on August 8, 1963. Cox became a full-time caregiver for Kyoko, while both he and Ono continued with their art, collaborating as conceptual artists.

Ono's growing estrangement from Cox, who had left the London flat they both shared in 1967, inspired her to create her artwork Half-A-Room, and the pain of their breakup inspired Ono to make Ceiling Painting/Yes Painting.

Their marriage fell apart during 1967, in part due to Ono meeting John Lennon at an art show in 1966. Cox and Ono divorced on February 2, 1969. By 1970, Cox had married an American woman named Melinda Kendall, and had moved to Denmark with Kyoko.

After a legal battle, Ono was awarded custody of Kyoko. However, in 1971, Cox—who had joined a Christian cult known as the Church of the Living Word, or "The Walk", after his divorce from Ono—vanished with his wife Melinda and Kyoko in violation of the custody order, and Cox changed Kyoko's name to Ruth Holman. He left "The Walk" after a few years, and in 1978, Cox and Kyoko stayed with the Jesus People USA commune in Chicago. His marriage with second wife Melinda was dissolved by the cult leader prior to leaving "The Walk".

...John Lennon and Yoko Ono were arrested and summarily deported after being accused of kidnapping Yoko's daughter Kyoko, who lived in Mallorca with her father, Anthony Cox.

Cox and Kyoko contacted Yoko Ono after the death of Lennon in 1980, without revealing their location. Subsequently, Ono agreed not to actively attempt to locate her daughter, although she stated her desire to make contact. In 1994, when she was 31, Kyoko decided to re-establish her contact with Ono and the two have maintained their relationship since then.

Ono did not pursue legal action on Cox. According to Kyoko, she viewed her father as “impossible,” “self-deluded” and a “major narcissist.”

In 1985, in an autobiographical documentary film, Vain Glory, Cox discussed his experiences with the Lennons, with the Church of the Living Word, and with life on the run. The film credits Kyoko as co-producer.

== See also ==
- List of fugitives from justice who disappeared
