= John Gimenez =

John Gimenez was an American Pentecostal evangelist. He was a pastor, international overseer and bishop of Rock Ministerial Family and Rock Church International, which he co-founded with his wife Anne in 1968. He founded the Washington for Jesus events. His first "Washington for Jesus" event in 1980 is regarded as a forerunner of the political rise of conservative Christians. Bishop Gimenez co-founded Network of Christian Ministries with Charles Green and Emanuele Cannistraci (Founding Pastor of Gateway City Church in San Jose, California). The Network of Christian Ministries unified hundreds of prominent ministries from different evangelical streams. Gimenez died suddenly on February 12, 2008.
