= The Living Word Fellowship =

Christian cult organization

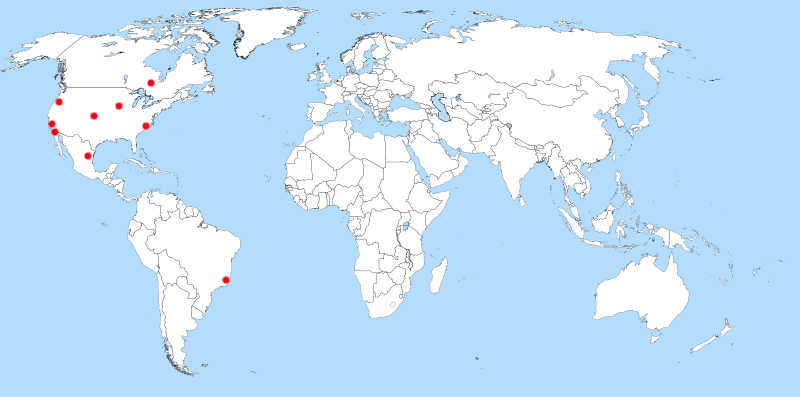
- A map of Living Word centers worldwide
- Nickname: The Walk; This Walk
- Formation: 1951
- Type: Religious and commercial
- Founder and leader: John Robert Stevens

The Living Word Fellowship is a Christian cult that at various times was located in the United States, Canada, Brazil, and Mexico.

The group was founded in South Gate, California, by John Robert Stevens in 1951. It has been known in the past informally as "The Walk" or "This Walk," referencing the Christian view that every Christian should have a "personal walk" with Jesus, from 1 John 1:6–7. The fellowship celebrated the Jewish festivals described in the Hebrew Bible, and "It believes in the inerrancy of the Scripture, in the Trinity, in Christ's saving work, and in the various gifts and ministries of the Spirit as taught by the apostle Paul."

At its peak in the 1970s, the fellowship had about 1000 member congregations. Its oversight was centered at Shiloh, a farm and retreat site near Kalona, Iowa. Membership declined after founder Stevens's death in 1983 and the fellowship continued to close churches throughout the 1990s. As of early 2018, it comprised around ten primary churches.

In late November 2018, in the wake of a sexual misconduct scandal within its branches, The Living Word Fellowship closed down the organization and its central governing body. Gary Hargrave resigned as head of the organization. He has since founded a new organization known as Hargrave Ministries. On December 21, 2018, Shiloh, which served as the headquarters of the fellowship since the 1970s, ended its affiliation with the group. Shiloh is currently in discussion with the city of Kalona about a possible annexation of the more than 200 acres (81 ha) of church property south of the city limits.

As of August 2020, five women have filed lawsuits against the Living Word Fellowship. The lawsuits claim that Living Word employees and officials sexually abused these women when they were minors.

In October 2020, the Kalona Volunteer Fire Department burned the former Shiloh Facilities to the ground. This was done as a practice burn.

== Notable members ==
- Anthony Cox
