= John Robert Stevens =

American pastor, cult leader, founder of The Living Word Fellowship

John Robert Stevens (August 7, 1919 – June 4, 1983) was an American pastor and cult leader who founded The Living Word Fellowship in the 1950s and was the leader of the organization until his death.

== Life ==
Stevens was born in Story County, Iowa. His parents, Eva Katherine and William J. Stevens, moved the family to California in 1929, during the Great Depression. In Los Angeles they attended the Angelus Temple, founded by Aimee Semple McPherson. In 1933 they returned to Washington, Iowa, where William Stevens founded the Christian Tabernacle church, in which young John Stevens taught children's Bible study and helped his father prepare sermons. John Stevens began preaching on his own in Gladwin, Iowa, in 1935, before his sixteenth birthday, under the auspices of the Four Square Gospel denomination. After his high school graduation in 1937 he also traveled locally and regionally as an evangelist and was ordained in the Assembly of God in September 1937.

Stevens was first married to Martha Mickelson in 1939 and had two daughters by this marriage, which ended in divorce. In 1980, John Robert married Marilyn Holbrook.

Stevens moved to the Los Angeles area in 1946 and later became pastor of an Assemblies of God church in Lynwood, California. Stevens was deeply affected by the Healing Revival and the Latter Rain Movement beginning in 1947. William Branham was a major influence on Stevens, who adopted many of his teachings and doctrines. When Assemblies of God formally rejected the Latter Rain movement and withdrew from participating in the healing revivals, Stevens began to have a conflict with the denomination. Around 1950 he was dismissed as pastor and separated from the Four Square Gospel and Assemblies of God denominations, claiming that they were rejecting divine revelation.

== The Living Word Fellowship ==
In 1951, Stevens established his own church in South Gate, California, and by 1955 he had expanded his ministry into a new movement based largely on the teachings of Branham and the Latter Rain. Initially called the Church of the Living Word, it was later called The Living Word Fellowship. The organization was also known informally as "The Walk" referencing the biblical view that every Christian should have a personal walk with Jesus Christ, from I John 1:6-7. For the remainder of his life he was the group's spiritual leader, expanding across the United States and into several other countries.

Stevens died in 1983. His widow, the former Marilyn Holbrook, married Gary Hargrave in 1984 and together they led the Fellowship until Marilyn's passing in 2015. The organization dissolved in 2018 in response to multiple allegations of child sexual abuse.

Many of Stevens' writings, as well as recordings of his sermons, continue to be distributed by Living Word Publications. At least one of Stevens' works was plagiarized.

== Books by Stevens ==
- The First Principles, The Living Word Publications, ISBN 1-891787-01-2, ISBN 978-1-891787-01-0
- Sparks from the Altar, The Living Word Publications, ISBN 1-891787-00-4, ISBN 978-1-891787-00-3

== Sources ==
- Moriarty, Michael (1992). The New Charismatics. Zondervan. ISBN 978-0-310-53431-0.
