= Washington for Jesus =

Series of American political rallies

- Part of Melding of the Republican Party with American Christianity
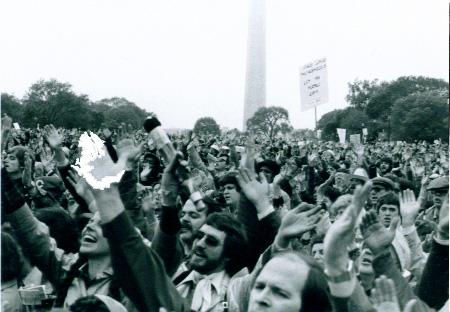
- Washington For Jesus, Washington D.C., April 29, 1980
- Location: Washington, D.C.
- Caused by: Religion and politics
- Goals: Political Change
- Methods: Mass rally, meetings with elected leaders, speeches

Washington for Jesus was a series of heavily attended rallies held in Washington, D.C. by various representatives of the American Christian church in the United States. The first rally was held in 1980 on 29 and 30 April and centered primarily on promoting a Christian viewpoint in the political arena. The religious leaders present included John Gimenez, Pat Robertson, Jerry Falwell, William Bright, and Benson Idahosa.

Although the event was ostensibly non-political, speeches and statements during the 1980 rally outlined many of the early points of the socially conservative agenda of the Christian right. It was during this time that many national leaders of the Christian right unified in their political stances against homosexuality, abortion, teenage pregnancy, drug abuse, increasing divorce rates, and the women's liberation movement. The event is regarded as a forerunner of the rise of political activism among conservative Christians, and the rallies are believed to have helped mobilize the religious right behind the candidacies of Ronald Reagan and George W. Bush.

== Evidence of political motives ==
Though billed as an apolitical gathering of Christians in DC, recently surfaced audio of a recruitment meeting led by John Gimenez and National Coordinator Ted Pantaleo points toward political motivations.

On the tape, Gimenez reminds ministers that, "Next year is a voting year, and we are talking about getting Ronald Reagan, and those candidates who will be running for President." Pantaleo instructs recruited ministers that "our job is to get one million people to Washington in 1980," further reiterating that they must "get as many people in your congressional district to come to Washington." Although Pantaleo informs recruits that Washington for Jesus' official purpose is to conduct "a once-in-a-lifetime celebration of the Lordship of Jesus Christ," he also outlines an organizational structure focused entirely on Congressional districts and informs ministers that, on the day preceding the rally, they will "meet simultaneously with every congressmen in the United States Congress."

Pantaleo also divulges a plan to meet with Congressmen on the day prior to the rally to make political demands. Pantaleo states that "we have done quite a bit of homework on how to approach the Congressmen," and to get what we want we "gotta go in and play hardball." Pantaleo describes 3-5 men teams assigned to each Congressman, those teams having been 'well trained' on the Congressman's voting record. Each team will possess a list of engaged Christian voters within their Congressional district (referred to as a "prayer list"), and will explain to the Congressman that each name on the list has spent the last year praying for them. The team will then make their demands known, with the threat that if their demands aren't met, "We'll have to vote you out of office."

=== Further revelations from recruitment tape ===
The Washington for Jesus recruitment tape contains further political commentary. Ted Pantaleo tells ministers that Washington for Jesus has identified and created a list of 'around sixty-five Born Again Christians in Congress'. Pantaleo relates California Congressman Dornan's concern that the American Society of Witches are listed as official users of military chapels, and that members of Congress are being given free abortion access. Pantaleo describes Chairman of the Oregon Republican Party Walter Huss as a "very good Christian" who believes America will be "physically encircled by our enemies" within the next five years. In reference to how Congressmen's legislative votes are swayed, Pantaleo states that an unnamed Congressman told him the Gay Rights Movement found success in Congress because "the gays are making so much noise".

== History and rallies ==
Washington for Jesus was founded by John Gimenez, the pastor of Rock Church in Virginia Beach, Virginia. Gimenez founded One Nation Under God, Inc. because, he said, he received prophecies that he should go to Washington to influence the future of the United States. Although Gimenez was essentially Charismatic in his beliefs, he was able to appeal to a larger segment of the Christian community with the help of his friend Pat Robertson, who was also based in the Virginia Beach area.

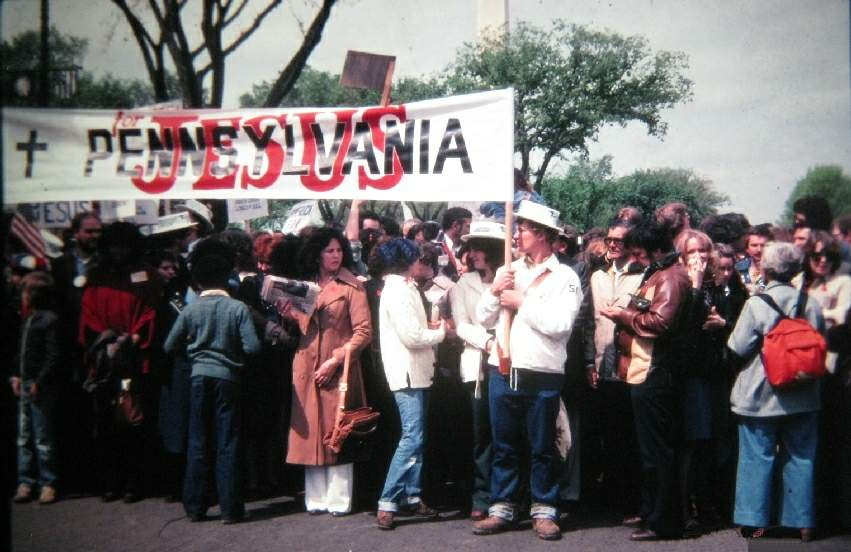

Independent estimates of attendance at the 1980 rally range from 125,000 to 200,000, while Robertson said the attendance was closer to 500,000. The Washington Metropolitan Area Transit Authority estimated that 400,000 trips were taken on the day of the event, which was a single day record, and the first time the system topped 400,000. This broke the record set on 2/26/1980. The record would last more than a year and a half until the pro-union Solidarity Day March.

While Bright argued that the participants had "not come to Washington with a political agenda or to lobby for certain legislation", speakers at the event were explicitly critical of Supreme Court decisions and warned that the increasing acceptance of abortion and homosexuality would provoke God's retaliation in the form of an attack by the Soviet Union. A group of 20 prominent religious organizations, including the National Council of Churches, criticized the Washington for Jesus rally as explicitly political and an effort to "Christianize the government".

During the 1988 rally, President Ronald Reagan addressed the crowd via videotape, describing his plan to make the following Thursday a National Day of Prayer. The National Park Service estimated the crowd at 200,000. The 1988 rally also helped set a single day record for Metrorail, with an estimated 565,000 trips on the day of the rally, breaking the record set by the Redskins Super Bowl victory parade two months earlier. The record would last until the Inauguration of George H.W. Bush in 1989.

The 1996 rally, held in pouring rain, drew an estimated 75,000 people, according to the U.S. Park Police.

In 2012, Gimenez' widow, Anne, spearheaded a two-day rally in Philadelphia called "America for Jesus."

== See also ==
- Christianity and politics
