= David Edwin Harrell =

American academic and historian (1930–2021)

- Born: February 22, 1930; Jacksonville, Florida, U.S.
- Died: March 15, 2021 (aged 91)
- Education: David Lipscomb College, B.A. 1954; Vanderbilt University, M.A. 1958, Ph.D. 1962
- Occupations: Author, historian
- Organizations: American Historical Association; American Society of Church History; Organization of American Historians; Disciples of Christ Historical Society; American Academy of Religion; Southern Historical Association
- Known for: Scholarship of American religion
- Spouse: Adelia Roberts (m. 1956)
- Children: 5

David Edwin Harrell Jr. (February 22, 1930 – March 15, 2021) was an American historian best known for his scholarship of religion in the United States.

Harrell was born in Jacksonville, Florida, to parents David Edwin (a physician) and Mildred Lee Harrell (a homemaker). He attended David Lipscomb College as an undergraduate, and Vanderbilt University as a graduate student. He received a Ph.D. in 1962.

Harrell was a professor at Auburn University, where he served as the Breeden Eminent Scholar of Southern History. He retired in 2006. He wrote biographies of Oral Roberts, Pat Robertson, and Homer Hailey, as well as other works about Pentecostalism and the Charismatic movement. In 2006, he published Unto a Good Land: A History of the American People, a college textbook that discusses the effects of religion in the history of the United States.

Harrell died on March 15, 2021.

== Church of Christ preaching/lectures ==
Harrell was a very popular preacher among the non-institutional churches of Christ. A frequent speaker at the annual Florida College Bible Lectures in Temple Terrace, Florida, and a repeat speaker during the mid-summer lecture series at Miller Avenue Church of Christ, in San Jose, California, during the 1980s, 1990s, and 2000s. There, he routinely shared the pulpit with popular evangelist, Darryl "Dee" Duane Bowman (1934–2021). Harrell also joined Bowman and three other fellow preacher/evangelists – Paul Earnhart, Sewell Hall, and Brent Lewis – in writing articles for Christianity Magazine, widely read among non-institutional churches of Christ, and in publication from 1983 until 1997. Although a serious intellectual, life-long University academician, and scholar, he was most appreciated for his "down home", southern preaching style, dry sense of humor, and his lectures on ecclesiology (the doctrine of the church), with a focus on Restoration Movement history, church denominational development/digression, and simple primitive New Testament theology.

== 1966 Reed Lectures – Disciples of Christ Historical Society ==
In 1966, Harrell was invited to address the 2nd annual Reed Lectures, to represent the best scholarship among the non-instrumental Churches of Christ; along with renowned Restoration Movement scholars Robert O. Fife, from the "independent", "instrumental" Christian Churches and Churches of Christ; and Ronald E. Osborn, from the mainline, liberal, and very ecumenical, Christian Church (Disciples of Christ) denomination; all under the auspices of The Disciples of Christ Historical Society. The "ecumenical" theme of the 1966 lectureship was "Disciples and the Church Universal". However, Harrell's anti-ecumenical speech was an argument for "legalistic sectarian Disciples":

"...Any man who believes that he can find literal truth in the Scriptures must also believe that those who do not find the same truth are wrong. What follows is that such people are sinful. The next logical conclusion is that they will go to hell. ... It is frequently assumed that they believe that all who do not accept the truths which they find in the Bible will be lost. All members of the Churches of Christ do not have such an attitude, but I do. ... But I do recognize that the logical consequence of a legalistic concept of truth—the kind of mind which would cause one to quibble about instrumental music—is the condemnation of those who refuse to accept the revelation. ..."

"...I believe in a literal and narrow interpretation of the Bible as the Word of God. My aim is the exact restoration of the ancient order of things... the Bible should be, can be, and is literally understandable and ...it should lead all men to the same conclusions. ..."

And quite specifically, the same conclusions regarding:... "...baptism for the remission of sins, the proper time for taking the Lord's Supper, the biological qualifications of elders, distinctions between individual and congregational activities..."

Regarding the lecture's stated theme of "The Church Universal", Harrell declared:... "...This doctrinal stance places obvious limitations on a speech on the relation of "my group" to the "Church Universal." From my theological point of view, the group to which I belong is the church universal. ..."
