= Doug Weaver (author) =

American author and historian

C. Douglas Weaver is an American author, historian, and Professor of Religion. A Baptist, Weaver has taught at Baylor University and Mercer University. He has authored multiple books on the history of Pentecostalism and the Baptist church.

== Works ==
- C. Douglas Weaver, Rady Roldan-Figueroa and Frick, Brandon Frick (2012). Exploring Christian Heritage: A Reader in History and Theology. Waco: Baylor University Press.
- C. Douglas Weaver (2010). Mullins, E. Y. The Axioms of Religion. Macon: Mercer University Press.
- Weaver, C. Douglas, Roldan-Figueroa, Radylocation= Macon. Series: Early English Baptist Texts, 11 vols. Mercer University Press.
- Beth Allison Barr, Bill J. Leonard, Mikeal C. Parsons, C. Douglas Weaver, Editors (2009). The Acts of the Apostles: Four Centuries of Baptist Interpretation. Waco, TX: Baylor University Press.
- Weaver, C. Douglas (2008). In Search of the New Testament Church: The Baptist Story. Macon: Mercer University Press.
- Weaver, C. Douglas (2004). Second to None: A History of Second-Ponce de Leon Baptist Church. Nashville: Baptist History and Heritage Society.
- Weaver, C. Douglas (2000). The Healer-Prophet, William Marrion Branham: A Study of the Prophetic in American Pentecostalism. Macon: Mercer University Press.
- Weaver, C. Douglas (2000). Every Town Needs a Downtown Church: A History of First Baptist Church, Gainesville, Florida. Nashville: Baptist History and Heritage Society.
- Weaver, C. Douglas (1997). Editor and primary contributor. From Our Christian Heritage: Hundreds of Ways to Add Christian History to Teaching, Preaching, and Writing. Macon: Smyth & Helwys Publishing Co.
- Weaver, C. Douglas (1993). . A Cloud of Witnesses: Sermon Illustrations and Devotionals from the Christian Heritage. Macon: Smyth & Helwys Publishing Co.
