= Guyana: Crime of the Century =

1979 film by René Cardona Jr.

- U.S. DVD cover
- Directed by: René Cardona Jr.
- Written by: René Cardona Jr.
- Produced by: René Cardona Jr.
- Starring: Stuart Whitman; Gene Barry; John Ireland; Jennifer Ashley; Bradford Dillman; Joseph Cotten
- Cinematography: Leopoldo Villaseñor
- Edited by: Earl Watson
- Music by: Alfredo Díaz Ordaz; Jimmie Haskell
- Production company: Re-Al Productions International; Corporación Nacional Cinematográfica; Izaro Films; Care
- Distributed by: Universal Pictures (U.S.)
- Release dates: 20 September 1979 (Mexico); 25 January 1980 (U.S.)
- Running time: 115 minutes (Mexico); 90 minutes (U.S.)
- Countries: Mexico; Spain; Panama
- Language: English
- Box office: $3,798,102

Guyana: Crime of the Century (Spanish: Guyana, el crimen del siglo; also known as Guyana: Cult of the Damned) is a 1979 exploitation docudrama film, based on the events of the Jonestown Massacre. It is written, produced, and directed by Mexican filmmaker René Cardona Jr., and stars Stuart Whitman, Gene Barry, John Ireland, Jennifer Ashley, Yvonne De Carlo and Joseph Cotten in the principal roles. The English-language film was a Mexican, Spanish, and Panamanian co-production, shot mainly in Acapulco.

Guyana was one of the first feature films dramatizing the Jonestown Massacre, premiering only 10 months after the incident occurred. The names of central characters are slightly tweaked from the historical ones: the film is set in "Johnsontown" rather than Jonestown, the cult is led by "Reverend James Johnson" (Whitman) rather than Rev. Jim Jones, and the murdered Congressman is "Lee O'Brien" (Barry) rather than Leo Ryan.

== Plot ==
In 1977, Reverend James Johnson, the fanatical and paranoid leader of an independent San Francisco church, moves his thousand-strong congregation to the jungles of Guyana. There, they will create their own utopia, free from the so-called corruption of the civilized world. Life at the commune, called "Johnsontown", becomes unbearable as Johnson turns to cruelty to keep his followers in line.

In November 1978, California Congressman Lee O'Brien visits Johnsontown with a team of reporters to investigate reports of abuse and commune members being held against their will. Despite a positive facade that Reverend Johnson puts on for the congressman, the reality of the camp becomes apparent. When O'Brien leaves Johnsontown with a group of defectors, Johnson orders his loyal hit squads to kill O'Brien and the reporters, and then orders his followers to commit ritual mass suicide.

== Cast ==
- Stuart Whitman as Reverend James Johnson (based on Jim Jones)
- Gene Barry as Congressman Lee O'Brien (Leo Ryan)
- John Ireland as Dave Cole (Mark Lane)
- Joseph Cotten as Richard Gable (Charles Garry)
- Bradford Dillman as Dr. Gary Shaw (Larry Schacht)
- Jennifer Ashley as Anna Kazan (Maria Katsaris and Carolyn Moore Layton)
- Yvonne De Carlo as Susan Ames (Sharon Amos)
- Nadiuska as Leslie Stevens
- Tony Young as Ron Harvey
- Erika Carlsson as Marilyn Johnson (Marceline Jones)
- Robert DoQui as Oliver Ross
- Hugo Stiglitz as Cliff Robson (Don Harris)
- Carlos East as Mike Sheldon
- Delroy White as U.S. Ambassdor Philip Banks (John R. Burke)
- Tito Junco as Thomas
- Enrique Lucero, Edith González, Leonor Llausás, Eduardo Noriega, and Carlos Riquelme as commune members

== Production ==
Filming took place entirely on-location in Acapulco and San Francisco.

== Reception ==
Upon theatrical release, the film received generally negative reviews from critics, who called it exploitative. Roger Ebert of the Chicago Sun-Times gave the film 0 out of 4 and wrote: "The movie brings absolutely no insights to Guyana. It exploits human suffering for profit. It is a geek show. Universal and its exhibitors should be ashamed."

=== Awards and nominations ===
Salvador Lozano Mena received a 1980 Ariel Award nomination for Best Production Design.

== Historical inaccuracies ==
Most notably, the "Johnsontown" membership is largely cast with white actors, while in reality, and at its height, the majority (68%) of Peoples Temple members were African-American.

Johnson is depicted throughout the film as a Christian fundamentalist. While the real Jim Jones was an ordained Protestant minister, by the time he had moved to Guyana he had largely rejected Christianity and adopted an esoteric belief system called "Apostolic Socialism".

Moreover, the film depicts "Susan Ames" (the fictionalized version of Peoples Temple loyalist Sharon Amos, as played by Yvonne De Carlo) being murdered, along with her children, by a shadowy, knife-wielding man. In reality, Sharon Amos—a hardcore supporter of Jim Jones stationed in nearby Georgetown—followed the orders of Jones for his followers to die on 18 November 1978. Amos reportedly took a kitchen butcher knife and slit the throats of her two youngest children (Christa, age 11, and Martin, age 10), then asked her eldest daughter Liane (age 21) to kill her with the knife, thus leaving Liane to kill herself.

As Johnson (Stuart Whitman) slowly dies from a gunshot, he pulls his shirt open by the lower four buttons. This is meant to reflect actual Jonestown death scene photos in which Jim Jones is seen lying on the pavilion floor with his red shirt open. The real reason Jones' shirt is due to post-mortem bloating of his chest cavity.

== Alternate versions ==
The 90-minute US cut runs 25 minutes shorter than the original, 115-minute Mexican cut. Aside from removing several violent and sexual scenes, the film also adds voiceover narration from an unseen male survivor.
