= Ralph Teetor =

American inventor (1890–1982)

- Teetor circa 1922
- Born: Ralph Rowe Teetor; August 17, 1890; Hagerstown, Indiana, U.S.
- Died: February 15, 1982 (aged 91); Richmond, Indiana, U.S.
- Education: University of Pennsylvania
- Occupations: Engineer, inventor
- Known for: Cruise control
- Spouse: Nellie Van Antwerp (m. 1922)
- Children: 1

Ralph Teetor (Note: sometimes mistakenly spelled as "Teeter") (August 17, 1890 – February 15, 1982) was a prolific inventor who invented cruise control. He was the longtime president of the automotive parts manufacturer The Perfect Circle Co. (acquired in 1963 by Dana Holding Corporation, then sold to Mahle GmbH in 2007) in Hagerstown, Indiana, a manufacturer of piston rings.

== Early life ==
Ralph Rowe Teetor was born on August 17, 1890, in Hagerstown, Indiana to John H. Teetor, a machinist and factory worker Teetor injured his eye at the age of five with a knife. Within a year, he developed sympathetic ophthalmia and became blind in both eyes.

In his youth he was known to frequently build things using whatever he could get his hands on. At 12 he had constructed an automobile that was powered by an old engine he found in the scrap heap of his father's machine shop.

Contemporary newspaper report on his childhood achievements, with Ralph Teetor's name misspelled as "Ralph Teeter"

Teetor graduated from Hagerstown High School in 1908. He graduated from the University of Pennsylvania with a bachelor's degree in mechanical engineering in 1912. He returned to the University of Pennsylvania and received a master's degree in engineering around 1930.

== Career ==
=== Early career and World War I ===
After college, he returned to Hagerstown and worked at the Teetor-Hartley Motor Company. He remained with his family's company until they sold their motor division off in 1918. In 1918, Teetor went to Camden, New Jersey to help the New York Shipbuilding Corporation balance turbine rotors on torpedo-boat destroyers in World War I. Teetor's highly developed sense of touch proved helpful in developing a technique for balancing steam turbine rotors used in Navy torpedo-boat destroyers. Dynamic balancing of large components had puzzled others before Teetor solved the problem.

=== Perfect Circle Company ===
After the war, he returned home. He designed a fluid-operated gearshift that he sold to Bendix in the 1920s. In 1919, he began to work for the Piston Ring Company (later called the Perfect Circle Company), the successor to the Teetor family's piston rings manufacturing division of the Teetor-Hartley Motor Company. From 1919 to 1946, he oversaw the engineering division as director and vice president. He was president of the company from 1946 to 1957. He remained on the board of directors until 1964. Perfect Circle was sold to the Dana Corporation in 1963.

=== Cruise control ===
Family lore suggests that Teetor was inspired to invent cruise control one day while riding with his family's lawyer, Harry Lindsay. The lawyer would slow down while talking and speed up while listening. This rocking motion so annoyed Teetor that he was determined to invent a speed control device. In 1948, after ten years of tinkering, Ralph Teetor received his first patent on a speed control device. Early names for his invention included "Controlmatic", "Touchomatic", "Pressomatic" and "Speedostat", with "Speedostat" becoming the trademark name. Teetor received a patent for the "Speedostat" on August 22, 1950. The Perfect Circle device wasn't used commercially until Chrysler introduced it as a luxury model option called the "Auto Pilot" in 1958. Cadillac marketed the product as "Cruise Control" and the name stuck and became the common name for the invention.

The throttle was controlled by a bi-directional screw drive electric motor, the two connected during use by an electromagnet. A 12v post would stay nearly centered between two throttle mounted electric contacts, one for turning the motor's screw for more throttle, the other for less. The floating post would "guide" the motor (and throttle and vehicle speed) with input from 1) sprung leveraged spinning weights driven from the transmission's speedometer cable, and 2) a counter-spring tension set by a cable from a dial near the steering wheel. This first-mass-marketed design was the industry standard for just over a decade (GM changed to vacuum-actuator/turn-signal-engage-button in 1969, though still a "Speedostat" product).

=== Other achievements ===
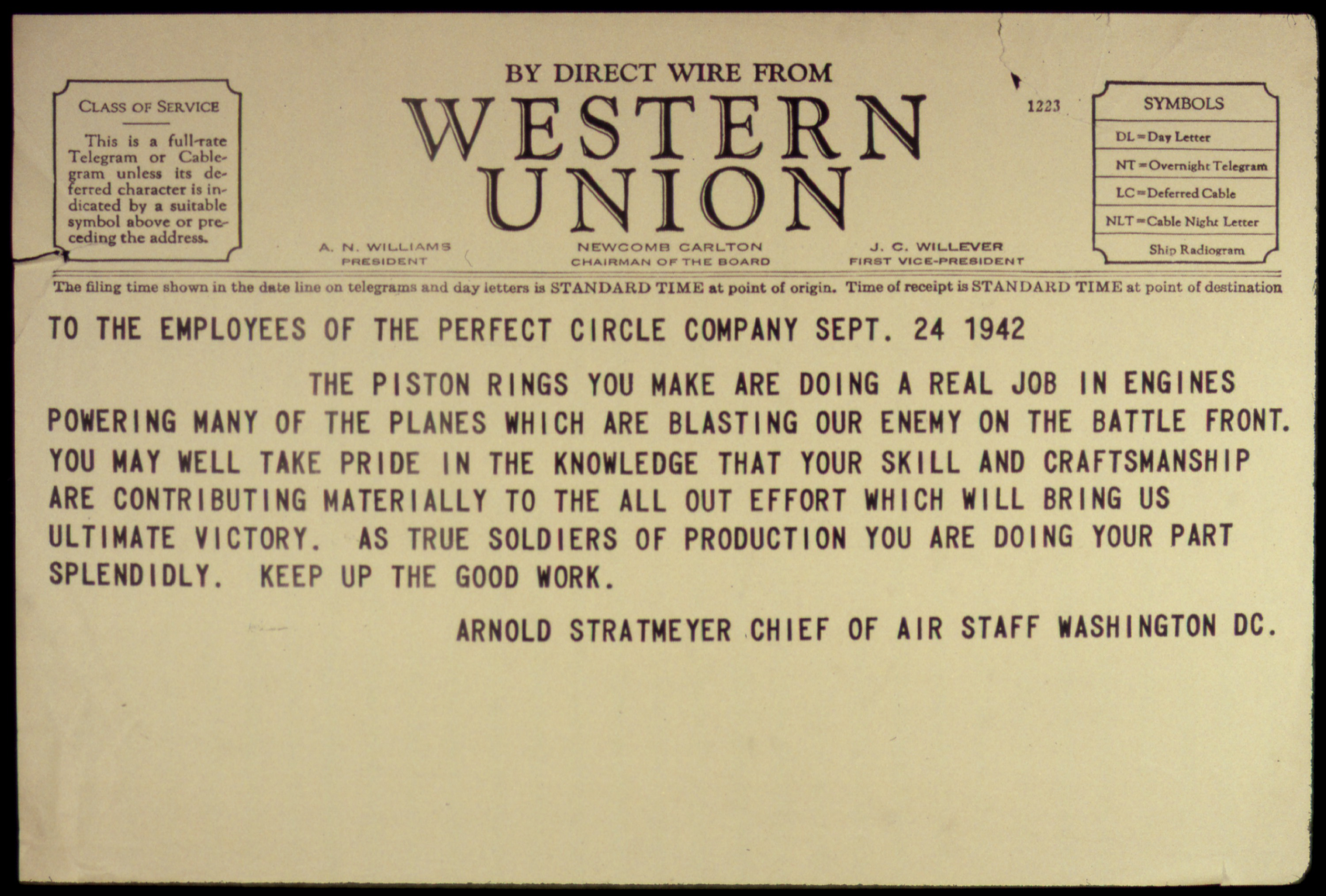
Telegram of appreciation to Perfect Circle Company employees for their contribution to the war effort, from Arnold Stratmeyer, Chief of Air Staff, 1942

Teetor managed to live his life almost as if his accident had never happened, and went on to become successful as an engineer, manufacturing executive and entrepreneur. His other inventions included an early powered lawn mower, lock mechanisms, and holders for fishing rods.

In 1936, Teetor was elected as president of the Society of Automotive Engineers (SAE). In 1963, he endowed the SAE's Ralph R. Teetor Educational Award which is awarded annually to stimulate "contacts between younger engineering educators and practicing engineers in industry and government."

In 1965, Teetor received two honorary degrees, Doctor of Engineering at the Indiana Institute of Technology and Doctor of Laws at Earlham College, Indiana. He was also made a Fellow of the American Society of Mechanical Engineers. The planetarium and one of the residence houses at Earlham College are named in Teetor's honor.

In 1988, Teetor was posthumously inducted into the Automotive Hall of Fame in Dearborn, Michigan, for his numerous contributions to the automotive industry. In 2024 he was inducted into the National Inventors Hall of Fame for his cruise control efforts, improving safety and fuel efficiency.

== Personal life ==
Teetor married Nellie Van Antwerp of Huntington, Indiana on December 30, 1922. Together, they had one daughter, Marjorie.

Charles N. Teetor, the inventor of a railway inspection car, was Teetor's uncle.

== Death ==
Teetor died on February 15, 1982, at Reid Memorial Hospital in Richmond, Indiana.
