= Ralph R. Teetor Educational Award =

Educational Award

Established in 1963, the Ralph R. Teetor Educational Award honors educators who are preparing engineers for their careers. It is the major program of the Ralph Teetor Educational Fund of SAE International.
