= Jim Jones =

American cult leader and mass murderer (1931–1978)

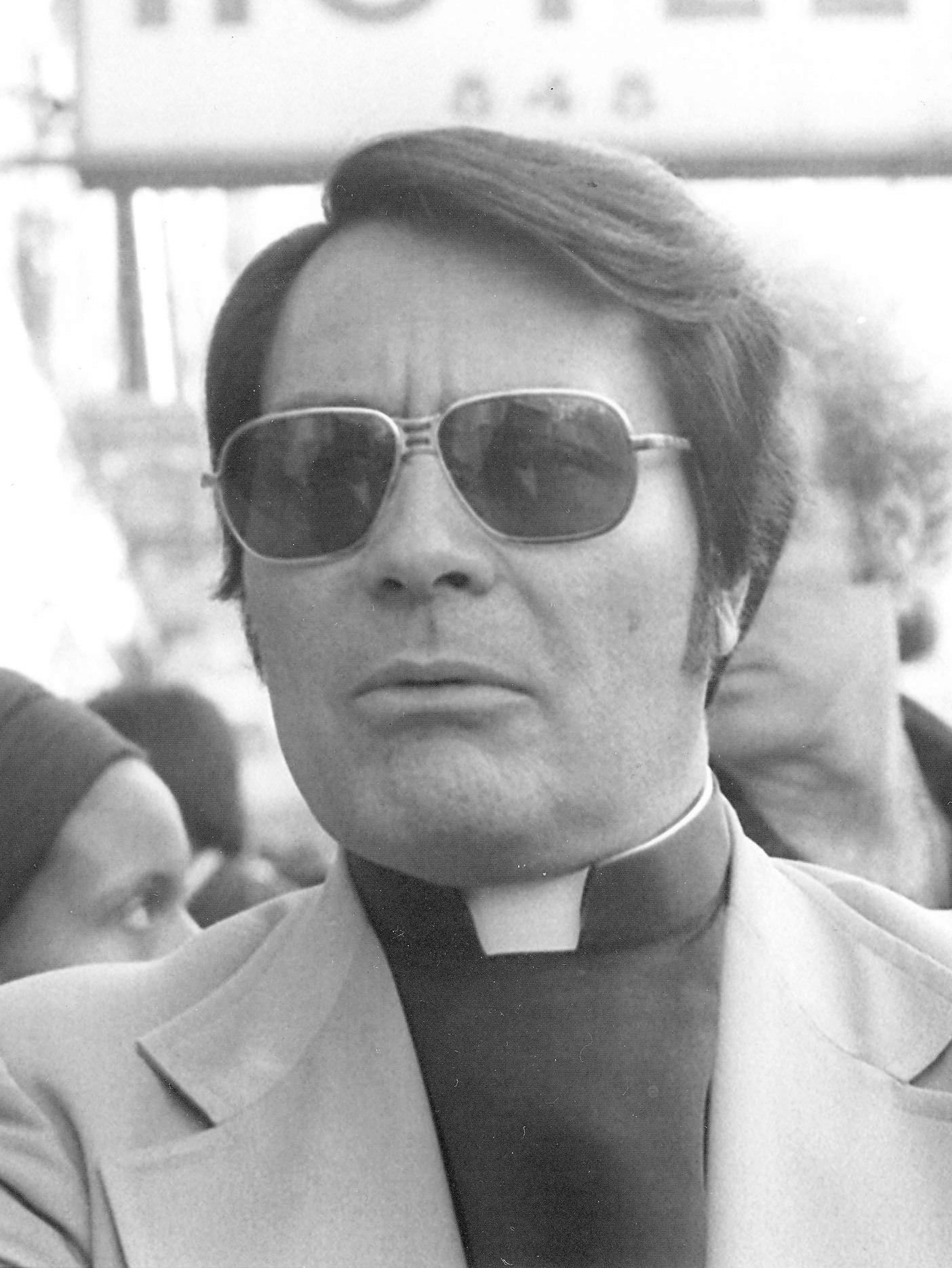
- Jones in 1977
- Born: James Warren Jones; May 13, 1931; Crete, Indiana, U.S.
- Died: November 18, 1978 (aged 47); Jonestown, Guyana
- Cause of death: Gunshot wound to the head (possible suicide)
- Body discovered: November 19, 1978
- Education: Indiana University; Butler University (BA)
- Occupation: Cult leader
- Known for: Founding the Peoples Temple; Perpetrating the Jonestown massacre
- Criminal status: Deceased
- Spouse: Marceline Baldwin (m. 1949)
- Partner(s): Carolyn Moore Layton (1968–1978); Maria Katsaris (1973–1978)
- Children: 9 (6 died at Jonestown)
- Criminal information

Details
- Date: November 18, 1978
- Targets: Members of the People's Temple in Jonestown, United States Representative Leo Ryan and his delegation
- Killed: 917
- Injured: 11
- Weapons: Cyanide-laced Flavor Aid, unspecified firearms

Leader of the People's Temple
- In office 1955–1978

Chairman of the San Francisco Housing Authority Commission
- In office 1976–1977
- Appointed by: George Moscone (D)

James Warren Jones (May 13, 1931 – November 18, 1978) was an American cult leader, preacher, and mass murderer who founded and led the Peoples Temple, a new religious movement between 1955 and 1978. Jones and the members of his inner circle planned and orchestrated a mass murder–suicide that resulted in the deaths of over 900 people (approximately 396 children). He described the action as "revolutionary suicide", a term coined by Huey P. Newton. The people went to their deaths at the remote jungle commune which they had developed at Jonestown, Guyana, which was operated like a mini-totalitarian police state under official permission and a formal land lease from the Government of Guyana. U.S. Congressman Leo Ryan, who had been visiting to investigate reports of human rights abuses and people wanting to leave, was also assassinated before his plane departed. Jones blended Pentecostal religious authority with Marxist–Leninist rhetoric, with an emphasis on racial equality during the civil rights movement, which resulted in most of his followers (and later victims) being African American.

As a child, Jones had developed an affinity for Pentecostalism and a desire to preach. He was ordained as a Christian minister in the Independent Assemblies of God, attracting his first group of followers while participating in the Pentecostal Latter Rain movement and the Healing Revival during the 1950s. Jones's initial popularity arose from his joint campaign appearances with the movement's prominent leaders William Branham and Joseph Mattsson-Boze, and their endorsement of his ministry.

Jones founded the organization that became the Peoples Temple in Indianapolis in 1955. In 1956, he began to be influenced by Father Divine and the Peace Mission movement. Jones distinguished himself through civil rights activism, founding the Temple as a fully integrated congregation. In 1964, he joined and was ordained a minister by the Disciples of Christ; his attraction to the Disciples was largely due to the autonomy and tolerance they granted to differing views within their denomination.

In 1965, Jones moved the Temple to California. The group established its headquarters in San Francisco, where he became deeply involved in political and charitable activity throughout the 1970s. Jones developed connections with prominent California politicians and was appointed as chairman of the San Francisco Housing Authority Commission in 1975. Beginning in the late 1960s, reports of abuse began to surface as Jones became increasingly vocal in his rejection of traditional Christianity; He began promoting a form of anti-capitalism that he called "Apostolic Socialism" and made claims of his own divinity. Jones became progressively more controlling of his followers in Peoples Temple, which had more than 3,000 members at its peak. His followers engaged in a communal lifestyle in which many turned over all their income and property to Jones and leaders of Peoples Temple, who directed all aspects of community life.

Following a period of negative publicity and reports of abuse at Peoples Temple, Jones ordered the construction of the Jonestown commune in Guyana in 1974; he convinced or compelled hundreds of his followers to live there with him. He claimed that he was constructing a socialist paradise free from the oppression of the United States government.

By 1978, reports surfaced of human rights abuses and accusations that people were being held in Jonestown against their will. U.S. Representative Leo Ryan led a delegation to the commune in November of that year to investigate these reports. While boarding a return flight with some former Temple members who wished to leave, Ryan and four others were murdered by gunmen from Jonestown.

Jones then ordered a mass murder-suicide that claimed the lives of 912 commune members; most of the members died by drinking Flavor Aid laced with cyanide. Those who resisted were forcefully injected with cyanide.

== Early life ==
Jim Jones was born on May 13, 1931, in the rural community of Crete, Indiana, to James Thurman Jones (October 21, 1887 – May 29, 1951) and Lynetta Putnam (April 16, 1902 – December 10, 1977). Jones was of Irish and Welsh descent; he and his mother both claimed to have some Cherokee ancestry, but there is no evidence of this. Jones' father was a disabled World War I veteran who suffered from severe breathing difficulties due to injuries sustained in a chemical weapons attack. He tried to augment his income by occasionally working on neighborhood road repair projects because his military pension was insufficient to support his family.

His father's illness led to financial difficulties and intense marital problems. In 1934, during the Great Depression, the Jones family was evicted from their home for failure to make mortgage payments. Their relatives purchased a shack in the nearby town of Lynn in which Jones grew up without plumbing and electricity. The family attempted to earn an income through farming but met with failure when the father's health further deteriorated. They often lacked adequate food, relied on financial support from their extended family, and sometimes resorted to foraging in the nearby forest and fields to supplement their diet.

According to multiple biographers, Jones' mother had "no natural maternal instincts" and frequently neglected her son. When Jones began school, his extended family threatened to cut off their financial assistance unless his mother got a job, forcing her to work outside her home. Meanwhile, Jones' father was hospitalized multiple times due to his illness. As a result, Jones' parents were frequently absent during his childhood. His aunts and uncles who lived close by gave him some supervision, but he often wandered the streets of the town, sometimes naked. Jones received some care from female residents of Lynn who frequently gave him food, clothing, and gifts.

=== Early religious and political influences ===
Myrtle Kennedy, the wife of the Nazarene Church's pastor, developed an attachment to Jones. She gave Jones a Bible, encouraged him to study it, and taught him to follow the holiness code of the Nazarene Church. As Jones grew older, he attended services at most of the churches in Lynn, was baptized in several of them, and often went to multiple churches each week. Even as a child, Jones aspired to become a preacher, and began to practice preaching in private. His mother was disturbed when she caught him imitating the pastor of the local Apostolic Pentecostal Church and attempted unsuccessfully to prevent him from attending the church's services.

Although they had sympathy for Jones, his neighbors reported that he was an unusual child who was obsessed with religion and death. Jones regularly visited a casket manufacturer in Lynn and held mock funerals for roadkill that he collected. One neighbor stated that Jones killed a cat with a knife for a funeral. When he could not get other children to attend his funerals, he would perform the services alone.

Jones claimed to have exceptional abilities, such as the capacity to fly. When he leaped off a roof to demonstrate his abilities, he fell and broke his arm but persisted in his claims. He sometimes put other children into life-threatening situations and told them that he was guided by the Angel of Death. According to claims he made as an adult, Jones committed countless pranks in the churches he attended as a child. He claimed that he stole the Pentecostal minister's Bible and covered Acts 2:38 with cow manure. He also asserted that he had once substituted a cup of his urine for the holy water at a Catholic church.

One Jones biographer suggested that he developed his unusual proclivities because making friends was difficult for him. Although his neighbors regarded his religious practices as his strangest characteristic, they also reported that he misbehaved more seriously. He frequently stole candy from town merchants, leaving his mother required to pay for his thefts. Like his mother, who frequently swore in public and found amusement in people being offended at a woman cursing, Jones used offensive profanity, commonly greeting people with, "Good morning, you son of a bitch" or "Hello, you dirty bastard". His mother usually beat him with a leather belt to punish his misbehavior.

Jones developed an intense interest in social doctrines and became a voracious reader, studying Adolf Hitler, Joseph Stalin, Karl Marx, and Mahatma Gandhi. He told his wife that Mao Zedong was his hero. He spent hours in the community library and brought books home to read. Jones did not espouse any radical political views in his youth, but as World War II started, he became interested in the Nazi Party. He was fascinated by its pomp, their cohesion, and Hitler's total power. The members of his neighborhood found it disconcerting that he extolled Nazi Germany. Jones acted as a dictator over the other children, ordering them to goosestep together and beating those who disobeyed. One childhood friend recalled Jones shouting "Heil Hitler!" and giving the Nazi salute to German prisoners of war who were traveling to a detention facility. Commenting on his childhood, Jones stated:

I was ready to kill by the end of the third grade. I mean, I was so aggressive and hostile, I was ready to kill. Nobody gave me love, any understanding. In those days a parent was supposed to go with a child to school functions. There was some kind of school performance, and everybody's parent was there but mine. I'm standing there, alone. Always was alone.

Tim Reiterman, a journalist and biographer of Jones, wrote that Jones's attraction to religion was strongly influenced by his desire for a family. Jones went to see the Kennedy family in 1942 when they spent the summer in Richmond, Indiana. They took part in services four times a week while attending a summer religious convention at a nearby Pentecostal church. When Jones returned to Lynn in the fall, he upset his neighborhood by explaining sexual reproduction in detail to young children. Jones's mother was urged to control his behavior by many individuals in Lynn, but she refused. Many parents decided to keep their kids away from Jones as a result of the issue. He had established himself as an outcast among his friends by the time he started high school and was progressively despised by the locals.

=== Education and marriage ===
In middle school, Jones continued to stand out from his peers. Jones went by the nickname "Jimmy" during his youth, and almost always carried his Bible with him. Jones was a good student who enjoyed debating with his teachers. He also had the habit of refusing to respond to anyone who spoke to him first and only engaged in conversations when he started them. In contrast to his peers, Jones was known to dress in his Sunday church clothes every day of the week. His religious views alienated him from other young people. He frequently confronted them for drinking beer, smoking, and dancing. At times, he would even interrupt other young people's events and insist that they read the Bible with him.

Jones did not enjoy participating in sports because he detested losing, so he coached teams for younger children instead. Jones was disturbed by the treatment of the African Americans who were in attendance at a baseball game he attended in Richmond, Indiana. The events at that baseball game brought discrimination against African Americans to Jones's attention and influenced his strong aversion to racism. Jones's father belonged to the Indiana branch of the Ku Klux Klan, which enjoyed considerable support in Indiana during the Great Depression. Jones described how he and his father had a disagreement about race and added that they had not spoken for "many, many years" as a result of his father's forbidding one of Jones's black friends from entering his home.

Jones's parents separated in 1945 and they eventually divorced. Jones moved to Richmond, Indiana with his mother, where he graduated from Richmond High School in December 1948 early and with honors. Jones and his mother lost the financial support of their relatives following the divorce. To support himself, Jones began working as an orderly at Richmond's Reid Hospital in 1946. Jones was well-regarded by the senior management, but staff members later recalled that Jones exhibited disturbing behavior towards some patients and co-workers. Jones began dating a nurse-in-training named Marceline Mae Baldwin while he was working at Reid Hospital.

Jones moved to Bloomington, Indiana in November 1948, where he attended Indiana University Bloomington with the intention of becoming a doctor, but changed his mind shortly thereafter. During his time at University, Jones was impressed by a speech that Eleanor Roosevelt delivered about the plight of African-Americans, and he began to espouse support for communism and other radical political views for the first time.

Jones and Baldwin continued their relationship while he attended college, and the couple married on June 12, 1949. Their first home was in Bloomington, where Marceline worked in a nearby hospital while Jones attended college. Marceline was Methodist, and she and Jones immediately fell into arguments about church. Jones's strong opposition to the Methodist church's racial segregationist practices was an early strain on their marriage, and throughout the duration of their relationship, Jones frequently emotionally and psychologically abused Marceline. Jones insisted on attending Bloomington's Full Gospel Tabernacle, but eventually compromised and began attending a local Methodist church on most Sunday mornings. Despite attending churches every week, Jones privately pressed his wife to accept atheism.

Through the years, Jones's marriage was affected by his insecurity. He often felt the need to test Marceline's love and loyalty, and at times he used sadistic methods to do so. One recurring tactic he used was to tell her that one of her close friends or family members had suddenly died, and then comfort her over the loss, before finally admitting to her the story was untrue.

After attending Indiana University for two years, the couple relocated to Indianapolis in 1951. Jones took night classes at Butler University to continue his education, finally earning a degree in secondary education in 1961. In 1951, the 20-year-old Jones began attending gatherings of the Communist Party USA in Indianapolis. Jones and his family faced harassment from government authorities for their affiliation with the Communist Party during 1952. Jones later asserted that in one event, his mother was harassed by FBI agents in front of her co-workers because she had attended a communist meeting with her son. Jones became frustrated with the persecution of communists in the U.S. Reflecting back on his participation in the Communist Party, Jones said that he asked himself, "How can I demonstrate my Marxism? The thought was, infiltrate the church."

== Peoples Temple ==
=== Beginnings in Indianapolis ===
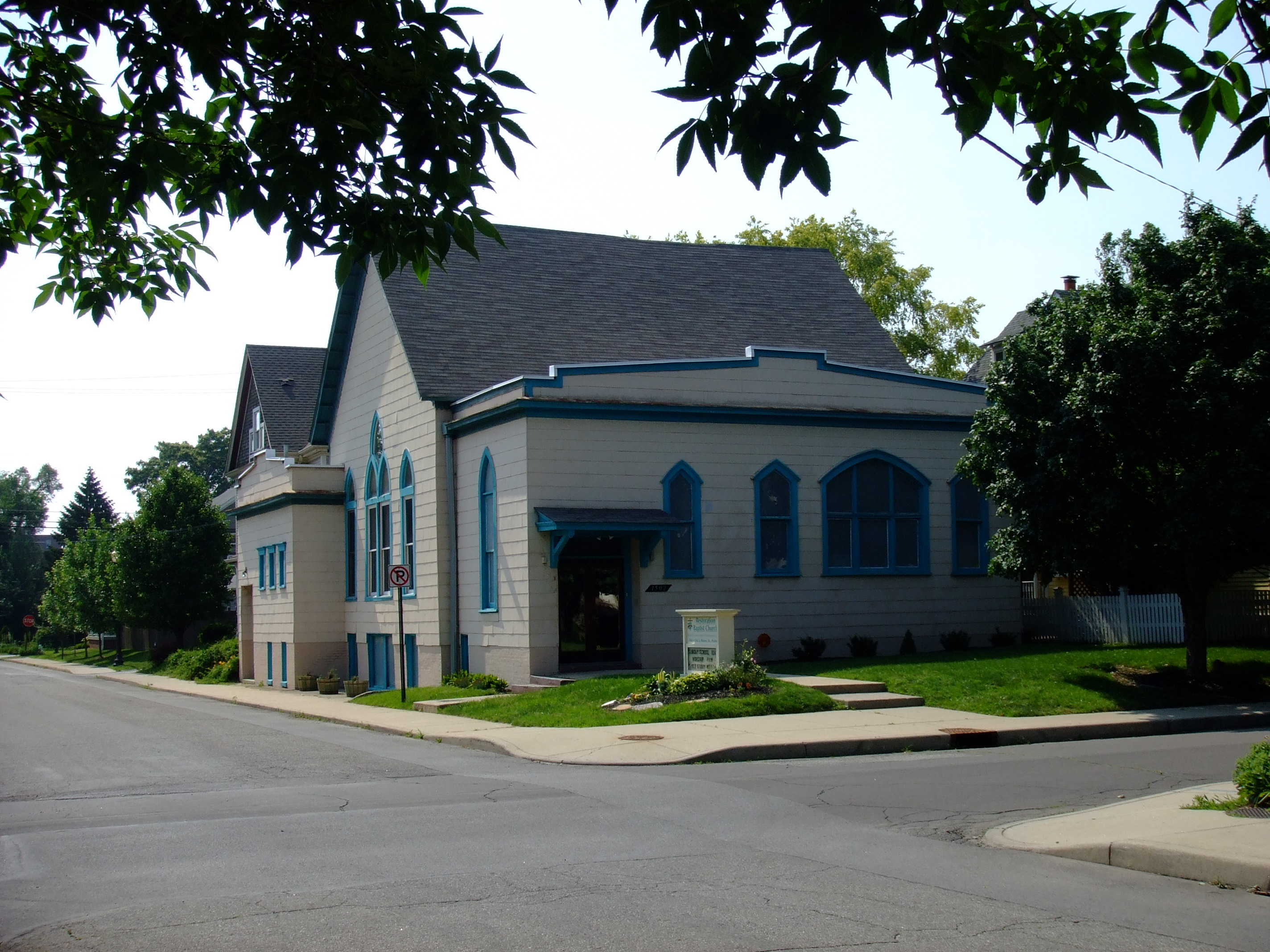
Jones's first church in Indianapolis

In early 1952, Jones announced to his wife and her family that he would become a Methodist minister, believing the church was ready to "put real socialism into practice." Jones was surprised when a Methodist district superintendent helped him get a start in the church, even though he knew Jones to be a communist.

In the summer of 1952, Jones was hired as student pastor to the children at the Sommerset Southside Methodist Church, where he launched a project to create a playground that would be open to children of all races. Jones continued to visit and speak at Pentecostal churches while serving as Methodist student pastor. In early 1954 Jones was dismissed from his position in the Methodist Church, ostensibly for stealing church funds, though he later claimed he left the church because its leaders forbade him from integrating African-Americans into his congregation.

Around this time in 1953, Jones visited a Pentecostal Latter Rain convention in Columbus, Indiana, where a woman prophesied that Jones was a prophet with a great ministry. Jones was surprised by the endorsement, but gladly accepted the call to preach and rose to the podium to deliver a message to the crowd. Pentecostalism was in the midst of the Healing Revival and Latter Rain movements during the 1950s.

The logo of the Peoples Temple, founded by Jones

Believing that the racially integrated and rapidly growing Latter Rain movement offered him a greater opportunity to become a preacher, Jones successfully convinced his wife to leave the Methodist church and join the Pentecostals. In 1953, Jones began attending and preaching at the Laurel Street Tabernacle in Indianapolis, a Pentecostal Assemblies of God church. Jones held healing revivals there until 1955 and began to travel and speak at other churches in the Latter Rain movement. He was a guest speaker at a 1953 convention in Detroit.

The Assemblies of God was strongly opposed to the Latter Rain movement. In 1955, they assigned a new pastor to the Laurel Street Tabernacle who enforced their denominational ban on healing revivals. This led Jones to leave and establish Wings of Healing, a new church that would later be renamed Peoples Temple. Jones's new church attracted only twenty members who had come with him from the Laurel Street Tabernacle and was not able to financially support his vision. At one point, he even sold pet monkeys to raise funds for his church. Jones saw a need for publicity, and began seeking a way to popularize his ministry and recruit members.

=== Latter Rain movement ===
Jones began to closely associate with the Independent Assemblies of God (IAoG), an international group of churches that embraced the Latter Rain movement. The IAoG had few requirements for ordaining ministers and they were also accepting of divine healing practices. In June 1955, Jones held his first joint meetings with William Branham, a healing evangelist and Pentecostal leader in the global Healing Revival.

In 1956, Jones was ordained as an IAoG minister by Joseph Mattsson-Boze, a leader in the Latter Rain movement and the IAoG. Jones quickly rose to prominence in the group and organized and hosted a healing convention to take place June 11–15, 1956, in Indianapolis's Cadle Tabernacle. Needing a well-known figure to draw crowds, he arranged to share the pulpit again with Branham.

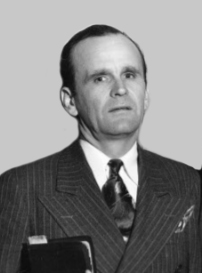
William M. Branham (pictured in 1947) helped launch and popularize Jones's ministry in 1956.

Branham was known to tell attendees their name, address, and why they came for prayer, before pronouncing them healed. Jones was intrigued by Branham's methods and began performing the same feats. Jones and Branham's meetings were very successful and attracted an audience of 11,000 at their first joint campaign. At the convention, Branham issued a prophetic endorsement of Jones and his ministry, saying that God used the convention to send forth a new great ministry.

Many attendees believed Jones's performance indicated that he possessed a supernatural gift, and coupled with Branham's endorsement, it led to rapid growth of Peoples Temple. Jones was particularly effective at recruitment among the African American attendees at the conventions. According to a newspaper report, regular attendance at Peoples Temple swelled to 1,000 thanks to the publicity Branham provided to Jones and Peoples Temple.

Following the convention, Jones renamed his church the "Peoples Temple Christian Church Full Gospel" to associate it with Full Gospel Pentecostalism; the name was later shortened to the Peoples Temple. Jones participated in a series of multi-state revival campaigns with Branham in the second half of the 1950s. Jones claimed to be a follower and promoter of Branham's "Message" during the period. Peoples Temple hosted a second international Pentecostal convention in 1957 which was again headlined by Branham. Through the conventions and with the support of Branham and Mattsson-Boze, Jones secured connections throughout the Latter Rain movement.

Jones adopted one of the Latter Rain key doctrines, which he continued to promote for the rest of his life: the Manifested Sons of God. William Branham and the Latter Rain movement promoted the belief that individuals could become manifestations of God with supernatural gifts and superhuman abilities. They believed that such a manifestation signaled the second coming of Christ, and that the people endowed with these special gifts would usher in a millennial age of heaven on earth. Jones was fascinated with the idea, and adapted it to promote his own utopian ideas and eventually the idea that he was himself a manifestation of God. By the late 1960s, Jones came to teach he was a manifestation of "Christ the Revolution".

Branham was a major influence on Jones who subsequently adopted elements of Branham's methods, doctrines, and style. Like Branham, Jones would later claim to be a return of Elijah the Prophet, the voice of God, a manifestation of Christ, and promote the belief that the end of the world was imminent. Jones learned some of his most successful recruitment tactics from Branham. Jones eventually separated from the Latter Rain movement following a bitter disagreement with Branham in which Jones prophesied Branham's death. Their disagreement was possibly related to Branham's racial teachings or Branham's increasingly vocal opposition to communism.

=== Peace Mission Movement ===
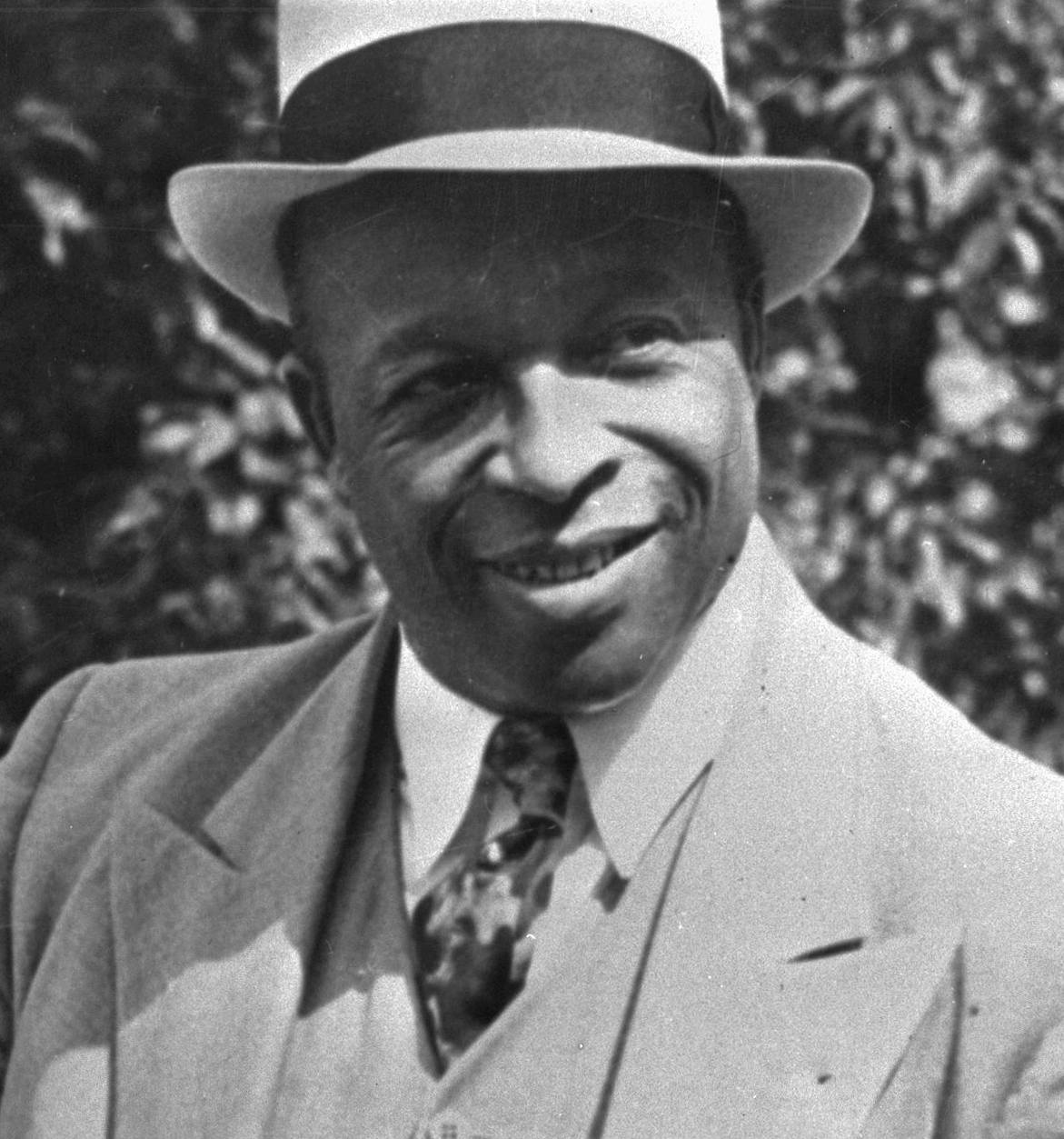
Father Divine (pictured in 1938) was a major influence on Jones's ministry.

Through the Latter Rain movement, Jones became aware of Father Divine, an African American spiritual leader of the International Peace Mission movement who was often derided by Pentecostal ministers for his claims to divinity. In 1956, Jones made his first visit to investigate Father Divine's Peace Mission in Philadelphia. Jones was careful to explain that his visit to the Peace Mission was so he could "give an authentic, unbiased, and objective statement" about its activities to his fellow Pentecostal ministers.

Divine served as another important influence on the development of Jones's ministry. While publicly disavowing many of Father Divine's teachings, Jones actually began to promote Divine's teachings on communal living and gradually implemented many of the outreach practices he witnessed at the Peace Mission, including setting up a soup kitchen and providing free groceries and clothing to people in need.

Jones made a second visit to Father Divine in 1958 to learn more about his practices. Jones bragged to his congregation that he would like to be the successor of Father Divine and made many comparisons between their two ministries. Jones began progressively implementing the disciplinary practices he learned from Father Divine, which increasingly took control over the lives of members of Peoples Temple.

=== Disciples of Christ ===
As Jones gradually separated from Pentecostalism and the Latter Rain movement, he sought an organization that would be open to all of his beliefs. In 1960, Peoples Temple joined the Disciples of Christ denomination, whose headquarters was nearby in Indianapolis. Archie Ijames assured Jones that the organization would tolerate his political beliefs, and Jones was finally ordained by Disciples of Christ in 1964.

Jones was ordained as a Disciples minister at a time when the requirements for ordination varied greatly and Disciples membership was open to any church. In both 1974 and 1977 the Disciples leadership received allegations of abuse at Peoples Temple. They conducted investigations at the time, but they found no evidence of wrongdoing. Disciples of Christ found Peoples Temple to be "an exemplary Christian ministry overcoming human differences and dedicated to human services." Peoples Temple contributed $1.1 million ($5,694,509 in 2024) dollars to the denomination between 1966 and 1977. Jones and Peoples Temple remained part of the Disciples until the Jonestown massacre.

=== Racial integration ===
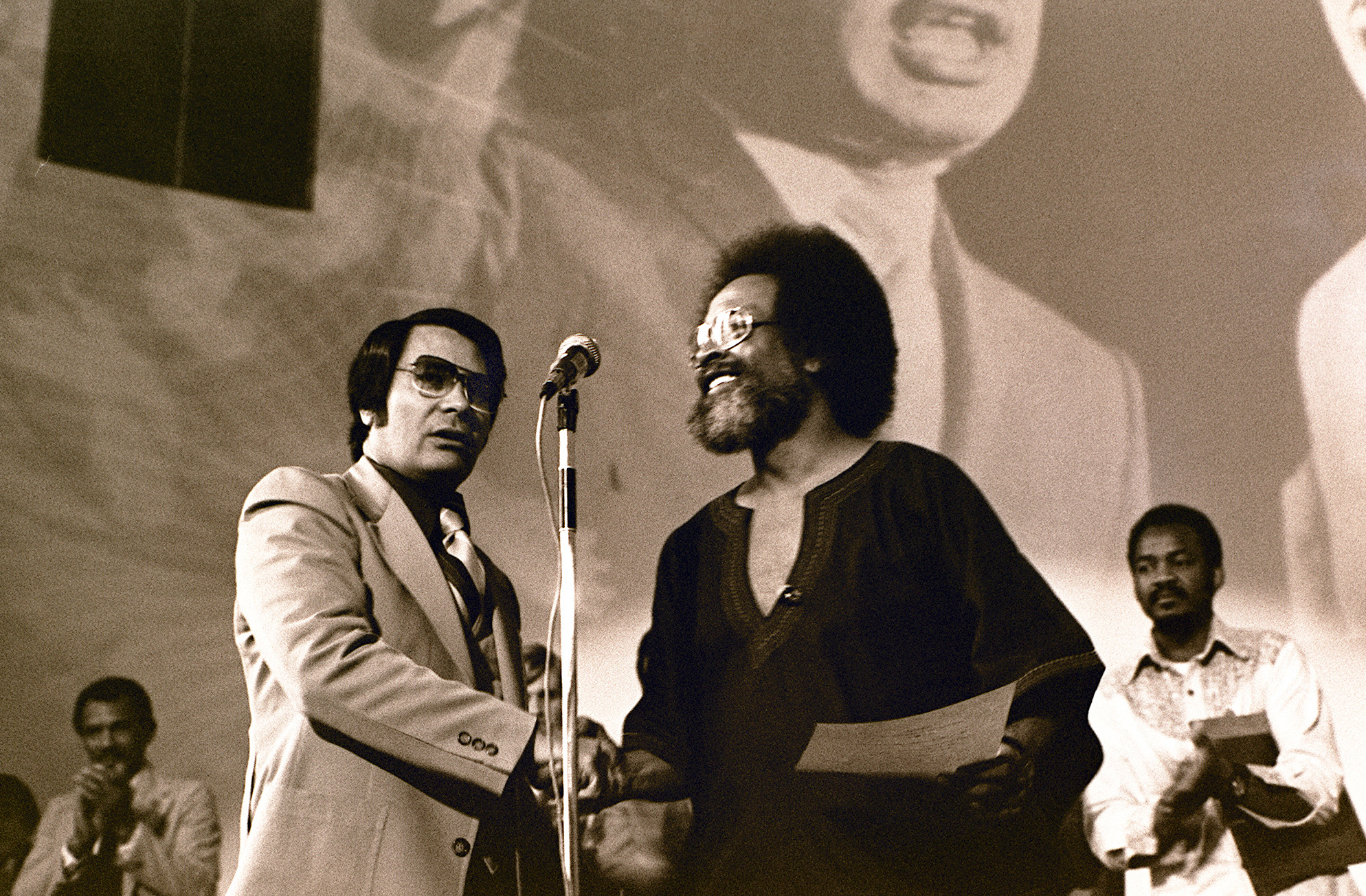
Jones receiving an award from Cecil Williams in January 1977

In 1960, the mayor of Indianapolis Charles Boswell appointed Jones director of the local human rights commission. However, Jones ignored Boswell's advice to keep a low profile, and he used the position to secure new outlets for his views on local radio and television programs. The mayor and other commissioners asked him to curtail his public actions, but he refused. Jones was wildly cheered at a meeting of the NAACP and the Urban League when he encouraged his audience to be more militant, capping his speech with, "Let my people go!"

During his time as commission director, Jones helped to racially integrate churches, restaurants, the telephone company, the Indianapolis Police Department, a theater, and an amusement park, and the Indiana University Health Methodist Hospital. When swastikas were painted on the homes of two black families, Jones walked through the neighborhood, comforted the local black community and counseled white families not to move.

Jones set up sting operations in order to catch restaurants which refused to serve black customers and wrote to American Nazi Party leaders and passed their responses to the media. In 1961, Jones suffered a collapse and was hospitalized. The hospital accidentally placed Jones in its black ward, and he refused to be moved; he began to make the beds and empty the bedpans of black patients. Political pressures which resulted from Jones's actions caused hospital officials to desegregate the wards.

In Indiana, Jones was criticized for his integrationist views. Peoples Temple became a target of white supremacists. Among several incidents, a swastika was placed on the Temple, a stick of dynamite was left in a Temple coal pile, and a dead cat was thrown at Jones's house after a threatening phone call. Nevertheless, the publicity that was generated by Jones's activities attracted a larger congregation. By the end of 1961, Indianapolis was a far more racially integrated city, and "Jim Jones was almost entirely responsible."

=== "Rainbow Family" ===
Jones and his wife adopted several non-white children. Jones referred to his household as a "rainbow family", and stated: "Integration is a more personal thing with me now. It's a question of my son's future." He also portrayed the Temple as a "rainbow family". In 1954, the Joneses adopted their first child, Agnes, who was part Native American. In 1959, they adopted three Korean-American children named Lew, Stephanie, and Suzanne, and encouraged Temple members to adopt orphans from war-ravaged Korea. Stephanie Jones died aged 5 in a car accident in May 1959.

In June 1959, Jones and his wife had their only biological child, naming him Stephan Gandhi. In 1961, they became the first white couple in Indiana to adopt a black child, naming him Jim Jones Jr. (James Jones Jr.). They adopted a white son, originally named Timothy Glen Tupper (shortened to Tim), whose birth mother was a member of the Temple. Jones fathered Jim Jon (Kimo) with Temple member Carolyn Layton.

=== Relocating Peoples Temple ===
Jones's Brazilian locations

In 1961, Jones warned his congregation that he had received visions of a nuclear attack that would devastate Indianapolis. His wife confided to her friends that he was becoming increasingly paranoid and fearful. Like other followers of William Branham who moved to South America during the 1960s, Jones may have been influenced by Branham's 1961 prophecy concerning the destruction of the United States in a nuclear war. Jones began to look for a way to escape the destruction he believed was imminent. In January 1962 he read an Esquire magazine article that purported South America to be the safest place to reside to escape any impending nuclear war. Jones decided to travel to South America to scout for a site to relocate Peoples Temple.

Jones made a stop in Georgetown, Guyana on his way to Brazil. Jones held revival meetings in Guyana, which was a British colony. Continuing to Brazil, Jones's family rented a modest three-bedroom home in Belo Horizonte. Jones studied the local economy and receptiveness of racial minorities to his message, but found language to be a barrier. Careful not to portray himself as a communist, he spoke of an apostolic communal lifestyle rather than Marxism. The family moved to Rio de Janeiro in mid-1963, where they worked with the poor in the favelas.

Unable to find a location he deemed suitable for Peoples Temple, Jones became plagued by guilt for abandoning the civil rights struggle in Indiana. During the year of his absence, regular attendance at Peoples Temple declined to fewer than 100. Jones demanded the Peoples Temple send all its revenue to him in South America to support his efforts and the church went into debt to support his mission. In late 1963, Archie Ijames sent word that the Temple was about to collapse, and threatened to resign if Jones did not soon return. Jones reluctantly returned to Indiana.

Peoples Temple's locations in California

Jones arrived in December 1963 to find Peoples Temple bitterly divided. Financial issues and low attendance forced Jones to sell the Peoples Temple church building and relocate to a smaller building nearby. To raise money, Jones briefly returned to the revival circuit, traveling and holding healing campaigns with Latter Rain groups. Possibly to distract Peoples Temple members from the issues facing their group, he told his Indiana congregation that the world would be engulfed by nuclear war on July 15, 1967, leading to a new socialist Eden on Earth, and that the Temple must move to Northern California for safety.

During 1964, Jones made multiple trips to California to find a suitable location to relocate. In July 1965, Jones and his followers began moving to their new location in Redwood Valley, California, near the city of Ukiah. Russell Winberg, Peoples Temple's assistant pastor, strongly resisted Jones's efforts to move the congregation and warned members that Jones was abandoning Christianity. Winberg took over leadership of the Indianapolis church when Jones departed. About 140 of Jones's most loyal followers made the move to California, while the rest remained behind with Winberg.

In California, Jones took a job as a history and government teacher at an adult education school in Ukiah. Jones used his position to recruit for Peoples Temple, teaching his students the benefits of Marxism and lecturing on religion. Jones planted loyal members of Peoples Temple in the classes to help him with recruitment. Jones recruited 50 new members to Peoples Temple in the first few months. In 1967, Jones's followers coaxed another 75 members of the Indianapolis congregation to move to California.

In 1968, the Peoples Temple's California location was admitted to the Disciples of Christ. Jones began to use the denominational connection to promote Peoples Temple as part of the 1.5 million member denomination. He played up famous members of the Disciples, including Lyndon Johnson and J. Edgar Hoover, and misrepresented the nature of his position in the denomination. By 1969, Jones increased the membership in Peoples Temple in California to 300.

=== Apostolic Socialism ===
Jones developed a theology influenced by the teachings of William Branham and the Latter Rain movement, Father Divine's "divine economic socialism" teachings, and infused with Jones's personal communist worldview. Jones referred to his views as "Apostolic Socialism". Jones concealed the communist aspects of his teachings until the late 1960s, following the relocation of Peoples Temple to California, where he began to gradually introduce his full beliefs to his followers. Jones taught that "those who remained drugged with the opiate of religion had to be brought to enlightenment", which he defined as socialism. Jones asserted that traditional Christianity had an incorrect view of God. By the early 1970s, Jones began deriding traditional Christianity as "fly away religion", rejecting the Bible as being a tool to oppress women and non-whites. Jones referred to traditional Christianity's view of God as a "Sky God" who was "no God at all". Instead, Jones claimed to be God, and no God beside him.

Jones increasingly promoted the idea of his own divinity, going so far as to tell his congregation that "I am come as God Socialist." Jones carefully avoided claiming divinity outside of Peoples Temple, but he expected to be acknowledged as god-like among his followers. Former Temple member Hue Fortson Jr. quoted him as saying:

What you need to believe in is what you can see.... If you see me as your friend, I'll be your friend. As you see me as your father, I'll be your father, for those of you that don't have a father.... If you see me as your savior, I'll be your savior. If you see me as your God, I'll be your God.

Further attacking traditional Christianity, Jones authored and circulated a tract entitled "The Letter Killeth", criticizing the King James Bible and dismissing King James VI and I as an "alcoholic" and "slave trader" who "oppressed our early Americans". Jones further claimed that as such, there was a need for a "prophet" sent from God to properly interpret his teachings. Jones rejected even the few required tenets of the Disciples of Christ denomination. Instead of implementing the sacraments as prescribed by the Disciples, Jones followed Father Divine's holy communion practices. Jones created his own baptismal formula, baptizing his converts "in the holy name of Socialism". Explaining the nature of sin, Jones stated, "If you're born in capitalist America, racist America, fascist America, then you're born in sin. But if you're born in socialism, you're not born in sin." Drawing on a prophecy in the Book of Revelation, he taught that American capitalist culture was irredeemable "Babylon".

Jones frequently warned his followers of an imminent apocalyptic nuclear race war. He claimed that Nazis and white supremacists would put people of color into concentration camps. Jones said he was a messiah sent to save people. He taught his followers the only way to escape the supposed imminent catastrophe was to accept his teachings, and that after the apocalypse was over, they would emerge to establish a perfect communist society. Publicly, Jones took care to always couch his socialist views in religious terms, such as "apostolic social justice". "Living the Acts of the Apostles" was his euphemism for living a communal lifestyle. While in the United States, Jones feared the public discovering the full extent of his communist views, which he worried would cost him the support of political leaders and risk Peoples Temple being ejected from the Disciples of Christ. Jones feared losing the church's tax-exempt status and having to report his financial dealings to the Internal Revenue Service.

Historians are divided over whether Jones actually believed his own teachings, or was just using them to manipulate people. Jeff Guinn said, "It is impossible to know whether Jones gradually came to think he was God's earthly vessel, or whether he came to that convenient conclusion to enhance his authority over his followers." In a 1976 interview, Jones claimed to be an agnostic and/or an atheist. Marceline stated in a 1977 New York Times interview that Jones was trying to promote Marxism in the U.S. by mobilizing people through religion. She said Jones called the Bible a "paper idol" that he wanted to destroy. Jones taught his followers that the ends justify the means and authorized them to achieve his vision by any means necessary. Outsiders would later point to this aspect of Jones's teachings to allege that he did not genuinely believe in his own teachings, but was "morally bankrupt" and only manipulating religion and other elements of society "to achieve his own selfish ends".

=== Early reports of abuse ===
Jones began using illicit drugs (principally amphetamines, methaqualone and pentobarbital) after moving to California, which further heightened his paranoia. He increasingly used fear to control and manipulate his followers. Jones frequently warned his followers that there was an enemy seeking to destroy them. The identity of that enemy changed over time from the Ku Klux Klan, to Nazis, to redneck vigilantes, and finally the American government. He frequently prophesied that fires, car accidents, and death or injury would come upon anyone unfaithful to him and his teachings. He constantly pressed his followers to be aggressive in promoting and fulfilling his beliefs.

Jones established a Planning Commission made up of his lieutenants to direct the Peoples Temples' communal lifestyle. Jones, through the Planning Commission, began controlling all aspects of the lives of his followers. Members who joined Peoples Temple turned over all their assets to the church in exchange for accommodation and food. Members who worked outside of the Temple turned over their income to be used for the benefit of the community. Jones directed groups of his followers to work on various projects for additional income and set up an agricultural operation in Redwood Valley to grow food. Large community outreach projects were organized, and Temple members were bussed to perform work and community service across the region.

The first known cases of serious abuse in Peoples Temple arose in California as the Planning Commission carried out discipline against members who were not fulfilling Jones's vision or following the rules. Jones's control over the members of Peoples Temple extended to their sex lives and who could be married. Some members were coerced to get abortions. Jones began to require sexual favors from the women of the church, and raped several male members of his congregation.

Members who rebelled against Jones's control were punished with reduced food rations, harsher work schedules, public ridicule and humiliations, and sometimes with physical violence. As the Temple's membership grew, Jones created an armed security group to ensure order among his followers and to guarantee his own personal safety.

=== Focus on San Francisco ===
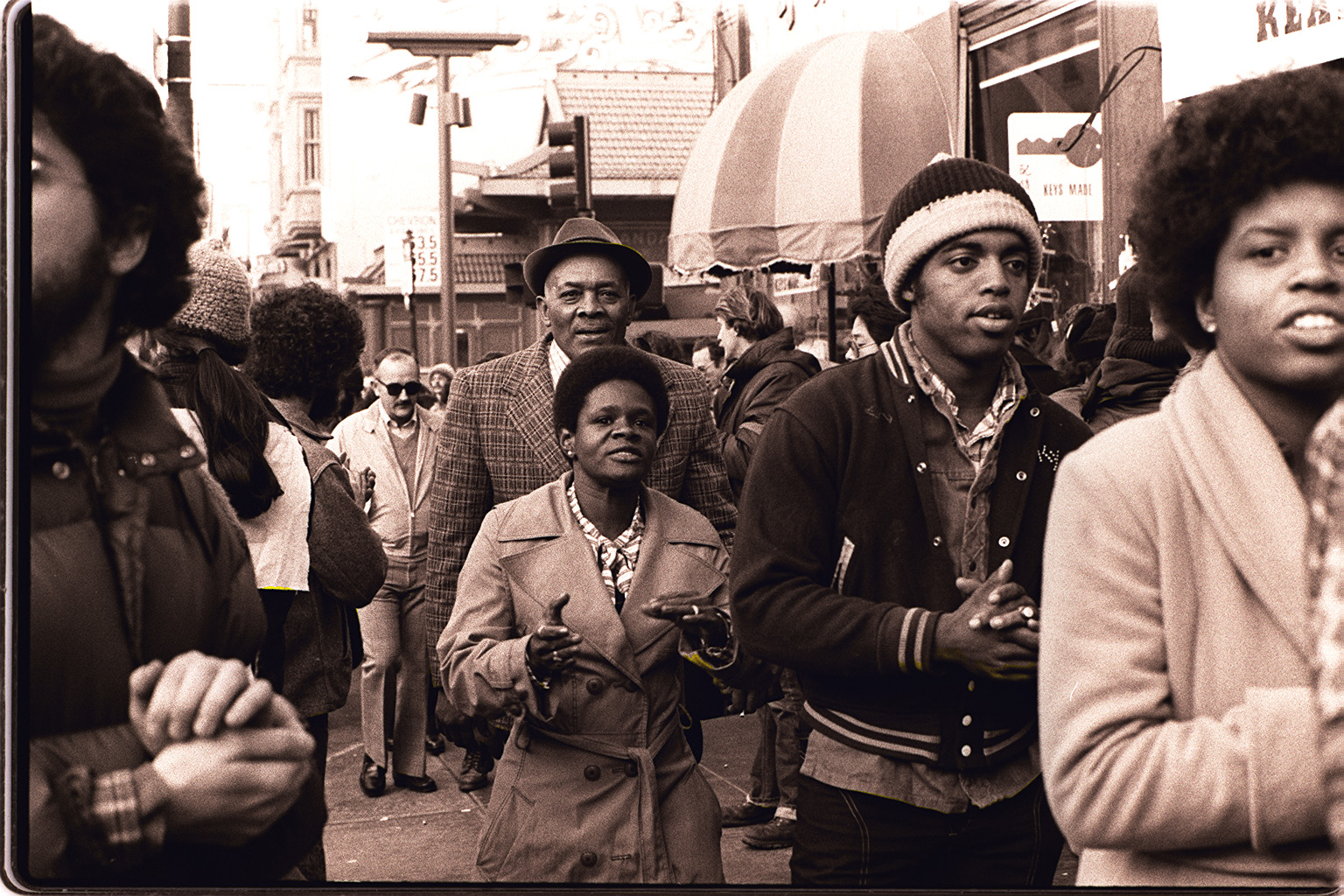
Peoples Temple members attend an anti-eviction rally at the International Hotel, San Francisco, in January 1977.

By the end of 1969, Peoples Temple was growing rapidly. Jones's message of economic socialism and racial equality, along with the integrated nature of Peoples Temple, proved attractive, especially to students and racial minorities. By 1970, the Temple opened branches in several cities including San Fernando, San Francisco, and Los Angeles as Jones began shifting his focus to major cities across California because of limited expansion opportunities in Ukiah. He eventually moved the Temple's headquarters to San Francisco, which was a major center for radical protest movements. By 1973, Peoples Temple reached 2,570 members, with 36,000 subscribers to its fundraising newsletter.

Jones grew the Temple by purposefully targeting other churches. In 1970, Jones and 150 of his followers took a trip to San Francisco's Missionary Baptist Church. Jones held a faith healing revival meeting wherein he impressed the crowd by claiming to heal a man of cancer; his followers later admitted to helping him stage the "healing". At the end of the event, he began attacking and condemning Baptist teachings and encouraging the members to abandon their church and join him.

The event was successful, and Jones recruited about 200 new members for Peoples Temple. In a less successful attempt in 1971, Jones and a large number of his followers visited the tomb and shrine erected for Father Divine shortly after his death. Jones confronted Divine's wife and claimed to be the reincarnation of Father Divine. At a banquet that evening, Jones's followers seized control of the event and Jones addressed Divine's followers, again claiming that he was Father Divine's successor. Divine's wife rose up and accused Jones of being the devil in disguise and demanded he leave. Jones managed to recruit only twelve followers through the event.

Jones became active in San Francisco politics and was able to gain contact with prominent local and state politicians. Thanks to their growing numbers, Jones and Peoples Temple played an instrumental role in George Moscone's election as mayor in 1975. Moscone subsequently appointed Jones as the chairman of the San Francisco Housing Authority Commission.

Jones hosted local political figures at his San Francisco apartment for discussions. In September 1976, Assemblyman Willie Brown served as master of ceremonies at a large testimonial dinner for Jones attended by Governor Jerry Brown and Lieutenant Governor Mervyn Dymally. At that dinner, Willie Brown touted Jones as "what you should see every day when you look in the mirror" and said he was a combination of Martin Luther King Jr., Angela Davis, Albert Einstein, and Mao. Harvey Milk spoke to audiences during political rallies held at the Temple, and he wrote to Jones after one such visit:

Rev Jim, It may take me many a day to come back down from the high that I reach today. I found something dear today. I found a sense of being that makes up for all the hours and energy placed in a fight. I found what you wanted me to find. I shall be back. For I can never leave.

Through his connections with California politicians, Jones was able to establish contacts with key national political figures. Jones and Moscone met privately with vice presidential candidate Walter Mondale on his campaign plane days before the 1976 election, leading Mondale to publicly praise the Temple. First Lady Rosalynn Carter met with Jones on multiple occasions, corresponded with him about Cuba, and spoke with him at the grand opening of the San Francisco headquarters—where he received louder applause than she did. Jones forged alliances with key columnists and others at the San Francisco Chronicle and other press outlets that gave Jones favorable press during his early years in California.

== Jonestown ==
=== Publicity problems ===
Jones began to receive negative press beginning in October 1971 when reporters covered one of Jones's divine healing services during a visit to his old church in Indianapolis. The news report led to an investigation by the Indiana State Psychology Board into Jones's healing practices in 1972. A doctor involved in the investigation accused Jones of "quackery" and challenged Jones to give tissue samples of the material he claimed fell off people when they were healed of cancer. The investigation caused alarm within the Temple.

Jones had been performing faith healing "miracles" since his joint campaigns with William Branham. "On several occasions his healings were revealed as nothing but a hoax." In one incident, Jones drugged Temple member Irene Mason, and while she was unconscious, a cast was put on her arm. When she regained consciousness, she was told she had fallen and broken her arm and been taken to the hospital. In a subsequent healing service, Jones removed her cast in front of the congregation and told them she was healed. In other instances, Jones had someone from his inner circle enter the prayer line for healing of cancer. After being "healed" the person would pretend to cough up their tumor, which was actually a chicken gizzard. Jones also pretended to have "special revelations" about individuals which revealed supposed hidden details of their lives:

Jones had coworkers who called at the potential recruits' homes, and asked detailed questions in the cover of doing an unrelated examination. This provided Jones with inside information that would make him seem clairvoyant and being in possession of superhuman powers.

— Ann Svendsen

Jones was fearful that his methods would be exposed by the investigation. In response, Jones announced he was terminating his ministry in Indiana because it was too far from California for him to attend to and downplayed his healing claims to the authorities. The issue only escalated however, and Lester Kinsolving ran a series of articles targeting Jones and Peoples Temple in the San Francisco Examiner in September 1972. The stories reported on Jones's claims of divinity and exposed purported miracles as a hoax.

In 1973, Ross Case, a former follower of Jones, began working with a group in Ukiah to investigate Peoples Temple. They uncovered a staged healing, the abusive treatment of a woman in the church, and evidence that Jones raped a male member of his congregation. Reports of Case's activity reached Jones, who became increasingly paranoid that the authorities were after him. Case reported his findings to the local police, but they took no action.

Shortly after, eight members of Peoples Temple made accusations of abuse against the Planning Commission and Peoples Temple staff members. They accused members of Planning Commission of being homosexuals and questioned their true commitment to socialism, before leaving the Peoples Temple. Jones became convinced he was losing control and needed to relocate Peoples Temple to escape the mounting threats and allegations.

On December 13, 1973, Jones was arrested and charged with lewd conduct for allegedly masturbating in the presence of a male undercover LAPD vice officer in a movie theater restroom near Los Angeles's MacArthur Park. On December 20, 1973, the charge against Jones was dismissed, though the details of the dismissal are not clear. The court file was sealed, and the judge ordered that records of the arrest be destroyed.

=== Escape to Guyana ===
Peoples Temple Agricultural Project (Jonestown, Guyana)

In the fall of 1973, Jones and the Planning Commission devised a plan to escape from the United States in the event of a government raid, and they began to develop a longer-term plan to relocate Peoples Temple. The group decided on Guyana as a favorable location, citing its recent revolution, socialist government, and the favorable reaction Jones received when he traveled there in 1963. In October, the group voted unanimously to set up an agricultural commune in Guyana. In December, Jones and James traveled to Guyana to find a suitable location.

In a newspaper interview, Jones indicated that he would rather settle his commune in a communist country like China or the Soviet Union, and was saddened about his inability to do so. Jones described Lenin and Stalin as his heroes, and saw the Soviet Union as an ideal society.

By the summer of 1974, land and supplies were purchased in Guyana. Jones was put in charge of the project and oversaw the installation of a power generation station, clearance of fields for farming, and the construction of dormitories to prepare for the first settlers. In December 1974, the first group arrived in Guyana to start operating the commune that would become known as Jonestown.

Jones left James to oversee Jonestown while he returned to the United States to continue his efforts to combat the negative press. He was largely unsuccessful and more stories of abuse in Peoples Temple were leaked to the public. In August 1977, Marshall Kilduff published a story in New West magazine exposing abuses at the Peoples Temple. The article included allegations by Temple defectors of physical, emotional, and sexual abuse.

The article convinced Jones that it was time to permanently relocate to South America, and he began to compel members of Peoples Temple to make the move with him. Jones promoted the commune as a means to create both a "socialist paradise" and a "sanctuary" from the media scrutiny in San Francisco. Jones purported to establish it as a model communist community, adding that the Temple comprised "the purest communists there are". Once they arrived in Jonestown, Jones prevented members from leaving the settlement.

Jonestown had about 50 settlers at the start of 1977 who were expanding the commune, but it was not ready to handle a large influx of settlers. Bureaucratic requirements after Jones' arrival sapped labor resources for other needs. Buildings fell into disrepair and weeds encroached on fields. James warned Jones that the facilities could only support 200 people, but Jones believed the need to relocate was urgent and determined to move immediately. In May 1977, Jones and about 600 of his followers arrived in Jonestown; about 400 more followed in the subsequent months. Jones began moving the Temple's financial assets overseas and started to sell off property in the United States. The Peoples Temple had over $10 million ($42,707,304 in 2020) dollars in assets at the time. Despite the negative press prior to his departure, Jones was still well respected outside of Peoples Temple for setting up a racially integrated church which helped the disadvantaged; 68% of Jonestown residents were black.

For the first several months, Temple members worked six days a week, from approximately 6:30 a.m. to 6:00 p.m., with an hour for lunch. The work week was shortened to eight hours a day for five days a week in the middle of 1978 after Jones' health started to fail and his wife started taking on more of the management of Jonestown's activities. After the day's work ended, Temple members would attend several hours of activities in a pavilion, including classes in socialism. Jones compared this schedule to the North Korean system of eight hours of daily work followed by eight hours of study. Jones would often read news and commentary, including items from Radio Moscow and Radio Havana, and was known to side with the Soviets over the Chinese during the Sino-Soviet split.

Jones's news readings usually portrayed the U.S. as a "capitalist" and "imperialist" villain, while casting "socialist" leaders, such as Kim Il Sung, Robert Mugabe, and Joseph Stalin in a positive light. Recordings of commune meetings show how livid and frustrated Jones would get when anyone did not understand or find interesting the message Jones was placing upon them. Jones forced every member of the Peoples Temple to say they were homosexual, while proclaiming himself the only heterosexual. In spite of this, Jones was bisexual, having sex with both male and female followers in Jonestown. Women who slept with him claimed he was the best lover they ever had; Peoples Temple member Tim Carter felt Jones "put them up to that kind of talk."

=== Mounting pressure and waning political support ===
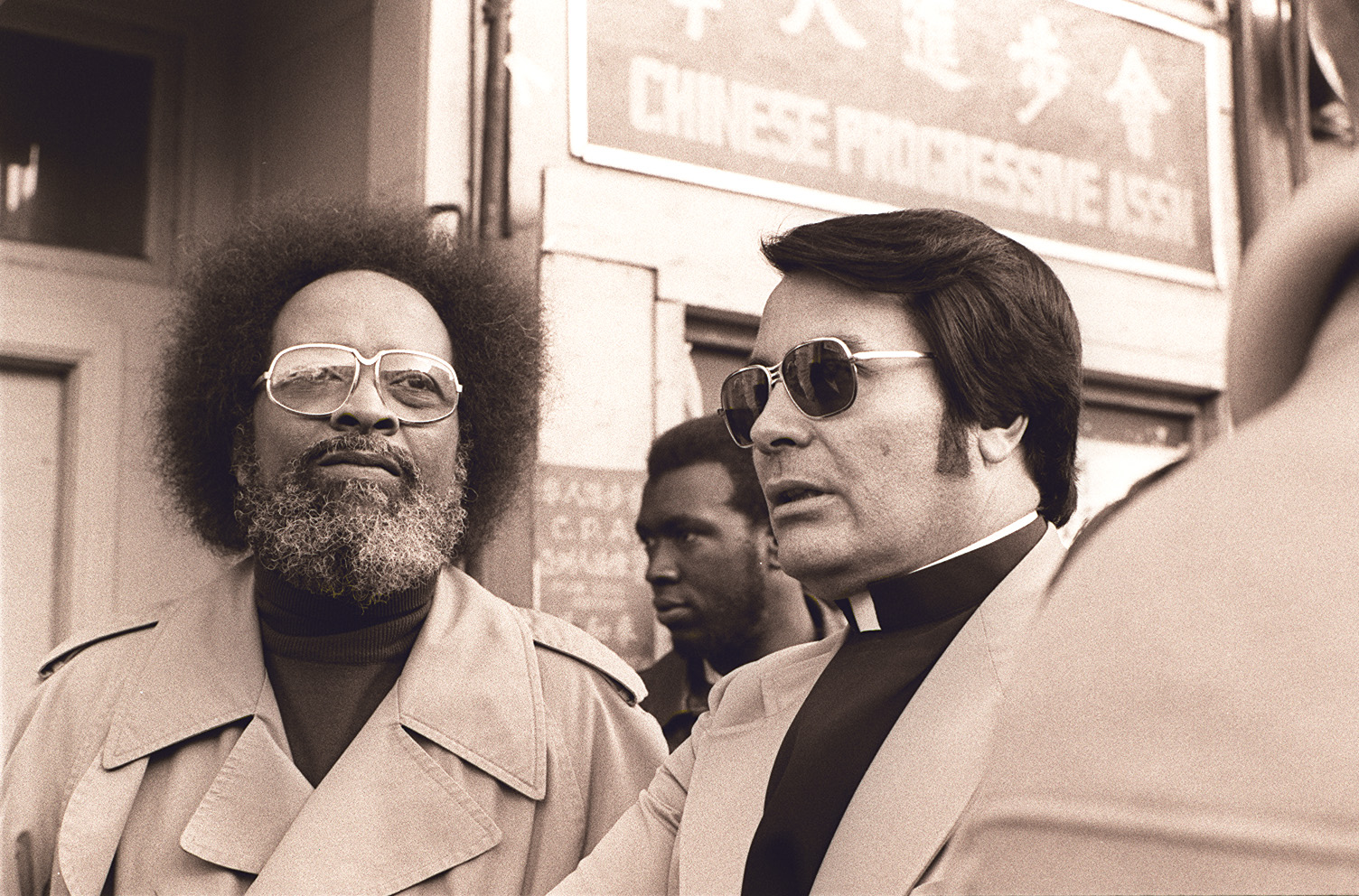
Jones and Williams at an anti-eviction protest at the International Hotel in San Francisco in January 1977

Among the followers Jones took to Guyana was five-year-old John Victor Stoen. John's birth certificate listed Timothy Stoen and Grace Stoen as his parents. Jones had a sexual relationship with Grace Stoen, and claimed he was the biological father of John. Grace Stoen left Peoples Temple in 1976, leaving her child behind. Jones ordered the child to be taken to Guyana in February 1977 to avoid a custody dispute with Grace. After Timothy Stoen also left Peoples Temple in June 1977, Jones kept the child at his own home in Jonestown.

In January 1977, Jones travelled to Cuba with Carlton Goodlett in order to establish an import-export trading relation with Cuba for a San Francisco Bay Area company that he had founded. While visiting Goodlett's business contacts and touring schools and other facilities, Jones was annoyed that President Fidel Castro had not consented to see him, and remarked that Castro had to be living better than the people. While in Cuba, Jones visited the residence of Black Panther Huey Newton in Havana, who had fled there from the United States to avoid murder charges. They talked for an hour about Newton's family members who had attended the Peoples Temple. They also discussed his desire to return to the United States. Jones commented that Newton only "missed his luxurious apartment and his favorite bars in Oakland".

In the autumn of 1977, Timothy Stoen and other Temple defectors formed a "Concerned Relatives" group because they had family members in Jonestown who were not being permitted to return to the United States. Stoen traveled to Washington, D.C., in January 1978 to visit with State Department officials and members of Congress, and wrote a white paper detailing his grievances against Jones and the Temple and to attempt to recover his son. His efforts aroused the curiosity of California Congressman Leo Ryan, who wrote a letter on Stoen's behalf to Guyanese Prime Minister Forbes Burnham. The Concerned Relatives began a legal battle with the Temple over the custody of Stoen's son.

Most of Jones's political allies broke ties after his departure, though some did not. Willie Brown spoke out against the Temple's purported enemies at a rally that was attended by Harvey Milk and Assemblyman Art Agnos. Mayor Moscone's office issued a press release saying Jones had broken no laws. On April 11, 1978, the Concerned Relatives distributed a packet of documents, letters, and affidavits to the Peoples Temple, members of the press, and members of Congress which they titled an "Accusation of Human Rights Violations by Rev. James Warren Jones".

In June 1978, Deborah Layton, a Peoples Temple member who escaped Jonestown six months before the massacre, provided the group with a further affidavit detailing crimes by the Temple and substandard living conditions in Jonestown. Layton's affidavit stated that Jonestown residents were being deliberately undernourished: "There was rice for breakfast, rice water soup for lunch, and rice and beans for dinner. On Sunday, we each received an egg and a cookie. Two or three times a week we had vegetables. Some very weak and elderly members received one egg per day." Jonestown stood on poor soil, so it was not self-sufficient and had to import large quantities of commodities such as wheat. However, Layton noted that Jones did not rely on the same diet as his followers. Instead, he consumed more substantial meals that frequently contained meat while "claiming problems with his blood sugar". He also permitted a few chosen members of his inner circle to eat from his personal supplies.

Jones was facing increasing scrutiny in the summer of 1978 when he hired JFK assassination conspiracy theorists Mark Lane and Donald Freed to help make the case of a "grand conspiracy" against the Temple by U.S. intelligence agencies. Jones told Lane that he wanted to "pull an Eldridge Cleaver", referring to a fugitive member of the Black Panthers who was able to return to the U.S. after rebuilding his reputation.

Jones attempted to negotiate for his commune to resettle in the Soviet Union. In October 1978, Feodor Timofeyev, Soviet consul to Guyana, visited Jonestown for two days and gave a speech. Jim Jones stated beforehand, "For many years, we have let our sympathies be quite publicly known, that the United States government was not our mother, but that the Soviet Union was our spiritual motherland." Timofeyev declared Jonestown in "harmony of theory" with "Marx, Engels, Lenin" and the "practical implementation of... some fundamental features of this theory," and personally thanked Jones.

=== White Nights ===
Jones's paranoia increased in Jonestown as he became fearful of a government raid on the commune. Concerned the community would not be able to resist an attack, he began holding drills to test their readiness. He called the drills "White Nights". Jones would call "Alert, Alert, Alert" over the community loudspeaker to call the community together in the central pavilion. Armed guards with guns and crossbows surrounded the pavilion.

The community members would remain at the pavilion throughout the drill, in which Jones told them that their community had been surrounded by agents who were about to destroy them. Jones led them in prayers, chanting, and singing to ward off the impending attack. Sometimes he would have his guards hide in the forest and shoot their firearms to simulate an attack. Jones's terrified followers were only told they were participating in a drill when the event was over. One drill, in September 1977, lasted for six days. Known as the 'Six Day Siege', this ordeal was used thereafter by Jones as a symbol of the community's indomitable spirit.

The drills served to keep the members of Jonestown fearful of venturing outside of the commune. Following two visits by United States Embassy personnel to check on the situation at Jonestown, and an IRS investigation in early 1978, Jones became increasingly convinced that the attack he feared was imminent. In one 1978 White Night drill, Jones told his followers he was going to distribute poison for everyone to drink in an act of suicide. A batch of fruit punch was served to everyone in the pavilion who sat by weeping and waiting for their death. After some time passed, Jones informed his followers that it was only a drill and there was not any poison in their drink. Through the White Nights, Jones convinced his followers that the Central Intelligence Agency (CIA) was actively working to destroy their community and conditioned them to accept suicide as a means of escape.

On at least two occasions during White Nights, after a "revolutionary suicide" vote was reached, a simulated mass suicide was rehearsed. Temple defector Deborah Layton described the event in an affidavit:

Everyone, including the children, was told to line up. As we passed through the line, we were given a small glass of red liquid to drink. We were told that the liquid contained poison and that we would die within 45 minutes. We all did as we were told. When the time came when we should have dropped dead, Rev. Jones explained that the poison was not real and that we had just been through a loyalty test. He warned us that the time was not far off when it would become necessary for us to die by our own hands.

The situation at Jonestown was deteriorating in 1978. The community was exhausted and overworked. Most were required to perform manual labor from early morning until evening. Loudspeakers were installed around Jonestown and sermons were played on a constant loop for the entire community to listen to. Jones began to propagate his belief in what he termed "Translation" once his followers settled in Jonestown, claiming that he and his followers would all die and live blissfully together in the afterlife. Meals were meager and workers were often hungry. After spending all day working, the community gathered each evening at the central pavilion to listen to Jones preach. His sermons generally lasted for several hours; most of the community was sleep deprived. According to Teri Buford O'Shea, one of the few escapees from Jonestown, sleep deprivation was one of the most effective methods of controlling Jones's followers. O'Shea said, "One time Jim said to me... 'Let's keep them poor and tired, because if they're poor they can't escape and if they're tired they can't make plans.'" O'Shea also reported that Jones would maintain his control of Peoples Temple members using punishments such as keeping them in a coffin-shaped box several feet underground, while other members were assigned to constantly berate and reprimand them for their perceived slights against the cult.

The majority of the community members were minors or the elderly, and the fewer people of working age found it difficult to keep up with the workload required to support the community. Healthcare, education, and food rations were all in limited supply and the situation was worsening. Jones's orders were increasingly erratic. He was seen staggering and urinating in public, but this was due to prostatitis for a short time towards the end of Jonestown in late October 1978, not the entirety of Jonestown. He found it difficult to walk without assistance around this time, but it cleared up by Ryan's visit.

After learning that he might have a lung infection in 1978, Jones told his followers that he actually had lung cancer in an effort to gain their compassion and increase their level of support. Jones was said to be abusing valium, quaaludes, stimulants, and barbiturates. Audio recordings of meetings held in Jonestown in 1978 attest to the commune leader's deteriorating health. Jones complained of high blood pressure that he had had since the early 1950s, small strokes, weight loss of 30 to 40 pounds in the last two weeks of Jonestown, temporary blindness, convulsions, and in late October to early November 1978 while he was ill in his cabin, grotesque swelling of the extremities.

=== Murder of Congressman Ryan ===
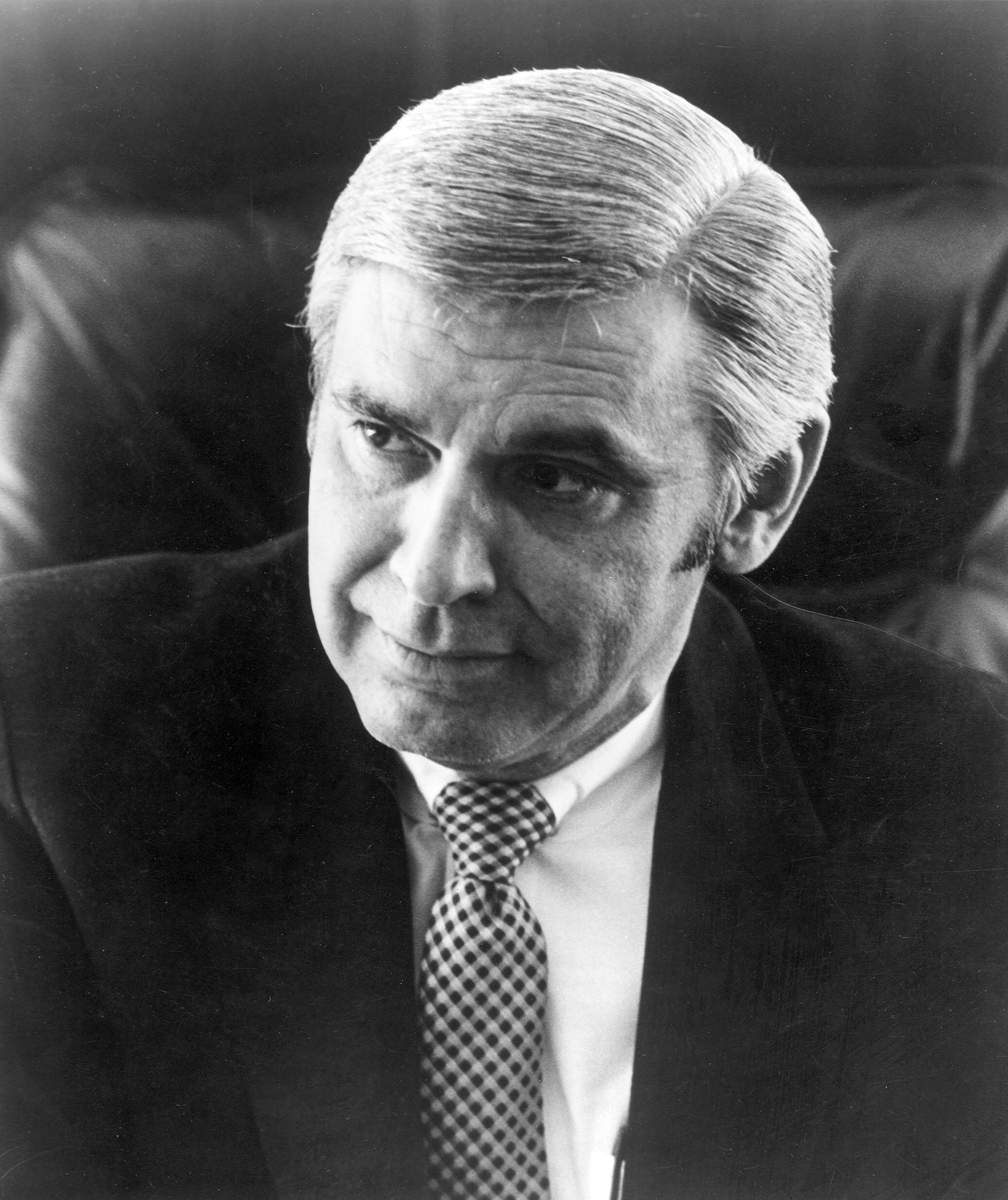
Congressman Leo Ryan was shot and killed on Jones's orders as he and others attempted to leave Jonestown in 1978.

In November 1978, Congressman Ryan led a fact-finding mission to Jonestown to investigate allegations of human-rights abuses. His delegation included relatives of Temple members, an NBC camera crew, and reporters for several newspapers. The group arrived in the Guyanese capital of Georgetown on November 15.

Two days later, they traveled by airplane to Port Kaituma, then were transported to Jonestown. Jones hosted a reception for the delegation that evening at the central pavilion in Jonestown, during which Temple member Vernon Gosney passed a note meant for Ryan to NBC reporter Don Harris, requesting assistance for himself and another Temple member, Monica Bagby, in leaving the settlement. Tensions began to rise as news spread through the community that some members were attempting to leave. Ryan's delegation left hurriedly the afternoon of November 18 after Ryan narrowly avoided being stabbed by Temple member Don Sly. Ryan and his delegation managed to take along 15 Temple members who expressed a desire to leave, and Jones made no attempt to prevent their departure at that time.

Marceline Jones announced on the public address system that everything was fine and urged locals to go back to their houses after Ryan left Jonestown for Port Kaituma. During this time, aides prepared a large metal tub with grape Flavor Aid, poisoned with diphenhydramine, promethazine, chlorpromazine, chloroquine, chloral hydrate, diazepam, and cyanide.

As members of Ryan's delegation boarded two planes at the Port Kaituma airstrip, Jonestown's Red Brigade of armed guards arrived and began shooting at them. The gunmen killed Ryan and four others near a Guyana Airways Twin Otter aircraft. At the same time, one of the supposed defectors, Larry Layton, drew a weapon and began firing on members of the party inside the other plane, a Cessna, which included Gosney and Bagby. NBC cameraman Bob Brown was able to capture footage of the first few seconds of the shooting at the Otter, just before he himself was killed by the gunmen.

The five killed at the airstrip were Ryan, Harris, Brown, San Francisco Examiner photographer Greg Robinson, and Temple member Patricia Parks. Surviving the attack were future Congresswoman Jackie Speier, a Ryan staff member; Richard Dwyer, Deputy Chief of Mission from the U.S. Embassy in Georgetown; Bob Flick, an NBC producer; Steve Sung, an NBC sound engineer; Tim Reiterman, an Examiner reporter; Ron Javers, a Chronicle reporter; Charles Krause, a Washington Post reporter; and several defecting Temple members. They escaped into the jungle to avoid being killed.

=== Mass murder-suicide in Jonestown ===
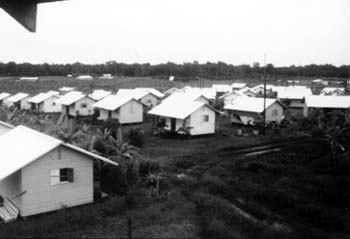
Houses in Jonestown, the year after the mass murder-suicide, 1979

Later the same day, November 18, 1978, Jones received word that his security guards had failed to kill all of Ryan's party. Jones concluded the escapees would soon inform the United States of the attack and they would send the military to seize Jonestown. Jones called the entire community to the central pavilion. He informed the community that Ryan was dead and it was only a matter of time before military commandos descended on their commune and killed them all.

Jones told Temple members that the Soviet Union would not give them passage after the airstrip shooting. Jones said, "We can check with Russia to see if they'll take us in immediately; otherwise, we die," asking, "You think Russia's gonna want us with all this stigma?"

With that reasoning, Jones and several members argued the group should commit "revolutionary suicide". Jones recorded the entire death ritual on audio tape. One Temple member, Christine Miller, dissented toward the beginning of the tape. Cries and screams of children and adults were also easily heard on the tape recording made. The Temple had received monthly half-pound shipments of cyanide since 1976 after Jones obtained a jeweler's license to buy the chemical, purportedly to clean gold. In May 1978, a Temple doctor wrote a memo to Jones asking permission to test cyanide on Jonestown's pigs, as their metabolism was close to that of human beings. A drink mixture of Flavor Aid and cyanide was handed out to the members of the community to drink. Those who refused to drink were injected with cyanide via syringe. The crowd was also surrounded by armed guards, offering members the basic dilemma of death by poison or death by a guard's hand.

Ruletta Paul and her one-year-old child were the first to consume the poison, according to escaped Temple member Odell Rhodes. The child's mouth was filled with poison using a syringe without a needle, and Paul then injected more poison into her own mouth. According to Rhodes, after ingesting the poison, people were taken down a wooden walkway that led outside the pavilion. As parents watched their children perish from the poison, Rhodes described a scene of panic and confusion. He added that many of the assembled Temple members "walked around like they were in a trance" and that the majority "quietly waited their own turn to die." Over time, as more Temple members perished, the guards themselves were called in to die by poison.

It is not clear if some initially thought the exercise was another White Night rehearsal. When members wept and showed signs of dissent, Jones counselled, "Stop these hysterics. This is not the way for people who are socialists or communists to die. No way for us to die. We must die with some dignity." Jones can be heard saying, "Don't be afraid to die", adding that death is "just stepping over into another plane", and adding that death is "a friend". Jones directed that the children be killed first. Then, the other adults poisoned themselves after the children had died. At the end of the tape, Jones concludes, "We didn't commit suicide; we committed an act of revolutionary suicide protesting the conditions of an inhumane world."

In the early evening of November 18, Temple member Sharon Amos in Georgetown received a radio message from Jonestown telling the members there to exact vengeance on the Temple's foes before committing suicide. Later, after police arrived at the headquarters, Sharon escorted her children, Liane, Christa, and Martin, into a bathroom. Wielding a kitchen knife, Sharon first killed Christa, and then Martin. Then, Liane assisted Sharon in cutting her own throat, after which Liane killed herself.

Eighty-five members of the community survived the event. Some slipped into the jungle just as the death ritual began; one man hid in a ditch. One elderly woman hid in her dormitory and slept through the event, awaking to find everyone dead. Three high-ranking Temple members were given an assignment to transfer the Peoples Temple's funds to the Soviet Embassy and thereby escaped death (one of them, Michael Prokes, would commit suicide four months later during a press conference in which he sought to reaffirm the Peoples Temple leadership's position justifying the mass murder-suicide and blaming it on the United States government). The Jonestown basketball team was away at a game and survived. Others hid in the dormitories or were away from the community on business when the death ritual unfolded.

Survivor Tim Carter has suggested that, like a previous practice, that day's lunch of grilled cheese sandwiches may have been tainted with sedatives to subdue members of the cult. Furthermore, in a 2007 interview with forensic psychiatrist Dr. Michael H. Stone for the program Most Evil, Carter stated his belief that Jones had his guards pose the dead bodies of the Jonestown residents to make it appear that more people had willingly committed suicide. In his hierarchy of "evil", Stone ranked Jones as a Category 22 (a psychopathic torture-murderer).

The mass murder-suicide resulted in the deaths of 909 inhabitants of Jonestown, 276 of them children, mostly in and around the central pavilion, along with the deaths of an additional four members residing in Georgetown. This resulted in the greatest single loss of American civilian life in a deliberate act until the attacks of September 11, 2001, in New York and Washington. The FBI later recovered the 45-minute audio recording of the mass poisoning in progress; the recording became known as the "Death Tape".

== Death and aftermath ==
Jones's three sons, Stephan, Jim Jr., and Tim Jones, were with the Peoples Temple's basketball team in Georgetown at the time of the mass poisoning. During the events at Jonestown, the three brothers drove to the U.S. Embassy in Georgetown to alert the authorities. Guyanese soldiers guarding the embassy refused to let them in after hearing about the shootings at the Port Kaituma airstrip. Later, the three returned to the Temple's headquarters in Georgetown to find the bodies of Sharon Amos and her three children, Liane, Christa and Martin.

The Guyanese military arrived in Jonestown to find the dead. The United States military organized an airlift to bring the remains back to the United States to be buried. Jones was found dead on the stage of the central pavilion; he was resting on a pillow near his deck chair with a gunshot wound to his head. Jones's body was later moved for examination and embalming. The official autopsy conducted by Guyanese coroner Cyril Mootoo in December 1978 confirmed Jones's cause of death as suicide. His son Stephan speculated that his father may have directed someone else to shoot him. The autopsy showed high levels of the barbiturate pentobarbital in Jones' body, which may have been lethal to humans who had not developed physiological tolerance. Jones's body was cremated and his remains were scattered in the Atlantic Ocean.

Guyanese soldiers kept the Jones brothers under house arrest for five days, interrogating them about the deaths in Georgetown. Stephan was accused of involvement in the deaths and placed in a Guyanese prison for three months. Tim and Johnny Cobb, other members of the Temple basketball team, were taken to Jonestown to identify bodies. After returning to the U.S., Jim Jones Jr. was placed under police surveillance for several months while he lived with his older sister, Suzanne, who had previously turned against the Temple. John Victor Stoen died in Jonestown at the age of six. His body was found just outside of Jones's house.

Chaeoke Jones, Lew Jones, and Terry Carter Jones; all died in the mass murder-suicide at Jonestown.

In a signed note found at the time of her death, Marceline directed that Jones's assets be given to the Communist Party of the Soviet Union. The Peoples Temple secretary had already made arrangements for $7.3 million (equivalent to $38.79 million in 2025) in Temple funds to be transferred to the Soviet Embassy in Guyana. Most of the money was held in foreign bank accounts and was transferred electronically, but $680,000 (equivalent to $3.61 million in 2025) was held in cash and three couriers were hired to transport the cash to the Soviets. The couriers were arrested before reaching their destination and claimed to have hidden most of the money.

== Reactions and legacy ==
The events at Jonestown were immediately subject to extensive media coverage and became known as the Jonestown Massacre. As awareness reached the public, outsiders refused to accept Jones's attempt to blame them for the deaths. Critics and apologists offered a variety of explanations for the events that transpired among Jones's followers. The Soviet Union publicly denounced Jones and what they called his "bastardization" of revolutionary values.

American Christian leaders denounced Jones as Satanic and asserted that he and his teachings were in no way connected to traditional Christianity. In an article entitled "On Satan and Jonestown", Billy Graham argued that it would be a mistake to identify Jones and his cult as Christian. Graham was joined by other prominent Christian leaders in alleging that Jones was demonically possessed.

The Christian Church (Disciples of Christ) responded to the Jonestown deaths with significant changes for ministerial ethics and a new process to remove ministers. The Disciples issued a press release disavowing Jones and reported that the community in Jonestown was not affiliated with their denomination. They subsequently expelled Peoples Temple from their denomination.

In the immediate aftermath, rumors arose that surviving members of Peoples Temple in San Francisco were organizing hit squads to target critics and enemies of the Church. Law enforcement intervened to protect the media and other figures who were purported to be targeted. Peoples Temple's San Francisco headquarters was besieged by the media, angry protestors, and family members of the dead. James, who returned from Jonestown to take leadership in San Francisco earlier in 1978, was left to address the public. At first, he denied that Jones had any connection to the deaths and alleged the events were a plot by enemies of the Church, but later acknowledged the truth.

The supporters of Peoples Temple, especially politicians, had a difficult time explaining their connections to Jones following the deaths. After a period of reflection, some admitted they had been tricked by Jones. President Jimmy Carter and First Lady Rosalynn Carter sought to minimize their connections to Jones. San Francisco Mayor George Moscone said he vomited when he heard of the massacre, and called the friends and families of many of the victims to apologize and offer his sympathies.

Investigations into the Jonestown massacre were conducted by the Federal Bureau of Investigation (FBI) and the United States Congress. Although individuals and groups had provided tips to the FBI about Peoples Temple, no investigation was made before the massacre. The investigation primarily focused on why authorities, especially the United States State Department, were unaware of the abuses in Jonestown. Although Peoples Temple collapsed shortly after the events of 1978, some individuals continued to follow Jones's teachings during the 1980s.

Since the Jonestown Massacre, a vast amount of literature and study has been produced on the subject. Numerous documentaries, films, books, poetry, music, and art have covered or been inspired by the events of Jonestown. Jim Jones and the events at Jonestown had a defining influence on society's perception of cults. The widely known expression "Drinking the Kool-Aid" developed after the events at Jonestown, although the specific beverage used at the massacre was Flavor Aid. (Note: Although Temple films show Jones opening a storage container full of Kool-Aid, empty packets found at the scene indicate that it was Flavor Aid that was used in the murder-suicide.)

== See also ==
- God complex
- List of people claimed to be Jesus
- List of people who have been considered deities

== Other media ==
- "God's Socialist" is a seven-part series released in 2020 on the Martyr Made Podcast, hosted by Nazi apologist Darryl Cooper. Centered on its primary subject, Jim Jones, the series explores his rise, influence, and the tragic events surrounding the Peoples Temple. To provide context for the world Jones was operating in, the series also offers a concise overview of the rise and decline of several far-left political organizations, including the Students for a Democratic Society, Black Panther Party, Weather Underground, and Symbionese Liberation Army. Additionally, it examines the hardships faced by residents of the South Bronx in the late 1960s and the impact of Martin Luther King Jr.’s nonviolent civil rights movements.
