= Archie Ijames =

Peoples Temple pastor (1913–1993)

Archie Ijames (September 1, 1913 – May 30, 1993) was an American Christian minister and assistant pastor of Jim Jones' Peoples Temple.

Born in Davie County, North Carolina, Ijames was the son of a sharecropper descended from former slaves. He became a minister in the Disciples of Christ and joined Jim Jones Peoples Temple in Indianapolis, Indiana in 1956. Ijames was a follower of William Branham who traveled to Indianapolis to attend Branham's joint revival with Jones in June 1956. Ijames was enamored with Jones' views on racial integration and became one of his earliest followers. He was instrumental in many different projects undertaken by Jones and Peoples temple.

Jones appointed Ijames as assistant pastor of the church and later to the executive board overseeing other ministers and church activities. Ijames was the only black minister that Jones permitted to preach at Peoples Temple. He was a sensitive man, and Ijames frequently brought the crowd to tears in his emotional sermons. Ijames convinced Jones to bring Peoples Temple into the Disciples of Christ denomination in 1960 and participated in the ceremony ordaining Jones as a Disciples of Christ minister in 1964. Ijames accompanied Jones on his 1973 trip to Guyana to inspect land for the creation of Jonestown. Ijames stayed behind in Guyana to oversee the early construction of the community.

Ijames returned to the United States in 1976 where he served in a leadership role at Peoples Temple's San Francisco church. After the Jonestown Massacre in November 1978, Ijames received significant media attention as the highest ranking member of Peoples Temple to escape the mass murder suicide.

After the events at Jonestown, Ijames left Peoples Temple. He became a street preacher in San Francisco, preaching to the homeless and organizing food and clothing drives for them.

== Sources ==
- Reiterman, Tom; Jacobs, John (1982). Raven: The Untold Story of Rev. Jim Jones and His People. E. P. Dutton. ISBN 978-0525241362.
