= Maria Katsaris =

American figure within the Peoples Temple cult movement (1953–1978)

- Born: Maria S. Katsaris; June 9, 1953; Pittsburgh, Pennsylvania, U.S.
- Died: November 18, 1978 (aged 25); Jonestown, Guyana
- Cause of death: Suicide, likely by cyanide poisoning
- Occupation: Financial secretary
- Known for: Leadership figure in Peoples Temple cult, Jonestown massacre
- Partner: Jim Jones (1973–1978)
- Family: Steven Katsaris (father); Anthony Katsaris (brother)

Maria S. Katsaris (June 9, 1953 – November 18, 1978) was a member of the Peoples Temple cult led by Jim Jones. She is known for being one of the most high-ranking figures in Temple leadership and one of Jim Jones' lovers.

== Background ==
Katsaris was born in 1953 in Pittsburgh, Pennsylvania into a middle-class Greek Orthodox family. She attended high school in Belmont, California before moving with her family to Ukiah, California, where she became acquainted with the Peoples Temple. According to her father Steven, Katsaris became "emotionally confused" during the 1960s due to political changes in the United States. She worked as a teacher's aide at Trinity School in Ukiah, where her father also worked, and attended the College of the Redwoods and Sonoma State University before dropping out to join the Peoples Temple in 1973.

== Peoples Temple role ==
Katsaris began her tenure in the Peoples Temple by helping with letter-writing campaigns, rising through the ranks to take on a major role in the organization's Planning Commission. She moved to Guyana, where the Temple had established its Jonestown settlement, in June 1977. Katsaris was heavily involved in the Peoples Temple's financial activities, which included transferring large sums of money between the United States and foreign bank accounts, and held the post of financial secretary at the time of her death. Her father Steven stated his belief that Katsaris was one of the three most powerful people in the organization. Katsaris and fellow inner circle member Carolyn Layton are noted to have assumed increased leadership responsibilities in the Temple's later years, as Jim Jones' heavy drug use escalated.

During the high-profile custody battle between the Temple and defectors Timothy and Grace Stoen, whose son John Victor had been left with the Temple and sent to Jonestown in 1977, Katsaris cared for the boy. It was reported that John Victor addressed Katsaris as "mother".

Like other high-ranking Peoples Temple women such as Carolyn Layton, Grace Stoen and Teri Buford, Katsaris was sexually involved with Jim Jones.

Research by journalist Julia Scheeres has found that Katsaris was intended to be part of an unrealized plot to hijack a commercial airliner and deliberately crash it. In 1975, Katsaris attended the Sierra Academy of Aeronautics in Oakland and received a private pilot's license, though she was instructed by Temple officials to only complete enough training to learn how to take the plane's controls.

== Events at Jonestown ==
Katsaris' father Steven was the chief organizer of the Concerned Relatives, a group of family members and Temple defectors who believed Temple members in Jonestown were being held against their will, and whose pressure prompted Congressman Leo Ryan to investigate the settlement in person. Katsaris' 23-year-old brother Anthony traveled to Jonestown on November 17, 1978, with Ryan, other Jonestown relatives and a news team, while Steven stayed behind in Guyana's capital, Georgetown.

Katsaris and her brother Anthony were interviewed side by side in Jonestown by NBC journalist Don Harris. Katsaris stated that she was happy in Jonestown, that she did not intend to return to the United States, and that there was "absolutely no problem between my brother and myself". Anthony expressed concern for his sister, and that it was hard to know that the words she was saying weren't "coming from somebody else's mouth".

On November 18, Leo Ryan left Jonestown with his entourage, including Anthony, and several defectors. Jim Jones sent Temple gunmen to ambush them at the Port Kaituma airstrip, killing Ryan and four others and wounding Anthony. Later that day, Jones called all Temple members in Jonestown to the pavilion to commit suicide. Katsaris and Jones' other aides prepared a large metal tub with poisoned Flavor Aid for that purpose.

Before the mass murder, Temple members Tim Carter, his brother Mike Carter, and Mike Prokes were given luggage by Katsaris containing $550,000 in US currency, $130,000 in Guyanese currency, and an envelope, which they were told to deliver to the Soviet Union embassy in Georgetown. Katsaris also reportedly arranged for money to be transferred from accounts in Swiss banks in Panama to the Soviet Union.

Katsaris was a signed witness to the last will and testament of Jim Jones' wife, Marceline, as well as Carolyn Layton.

An audio recording, known as the Peoples Temple "Death Tape", documents events leading up to, and a portion of, the mass suicide. On the tape (@-18:00), as the adults are giving the poisoned Flavor Aid to their children, a woman tells the crowd to keep calm, and infamously says that the children are "not crying from pain. It’s just a little bitter tasting". This woman is widely believed to be Maria Katsaris.

== Death and legacy ==
Katsaris died on the night of November 18 along with over 900 other Jonestown residents, though unlike the vast majority of victims, she died in Jim Jones' cabin. The cause of death was assessed as probable cyanide poisoning. A coroner's jury in Guyana ruled that of the victims of Jonestown, only Katsaris and Anne Moore, another of Jones' mistresses, had committed suicide of their own free will.

Katsaris is buried in Potter Valley, California. Her brother Anthony, though badly injured from the airstrip attack, recovered and became a teacher.
