= Carolyn Moore Layton =

Figure within the Peoples Temple (1945–1978)

- Born: Carolyn Louise Moore; July 13, 1945; Sacramento, California, U.S.
- Died: November 18, 1978 (aged 33); Jonestown, Guyana
- Cause of death: Suicide by poisoning
- Occupations: Teacher, radio operator, administrator, accountant.
- Known for: Leadership figure in Peoples Temple cult, Jonestown massacre
- Spouse: Larry Layton (m. 1967; div. 1969)
- Partner: Jim Jones (1968–1978)
- Children: 1

Carolyn Louise Moore Layton (née Moore; July 13, 1945 – November 18, 1978) was a leadership figure within Peoples Temple, including for financial issues, and a long-term partner of Temple leader Jim Jones.

Along with other inner circle members, she assisted in the planning of the mass murder that took place in Jonestown, Guyana on November 18, 1978 and died that day. Her son with Jones, Jim Jon "Kimo" Prokes, also died then.

== Early life ==
Carolyn Louise Moore was born in Sacramento on July 13, 1945. Her father, John V Moore (1919–2019), was a Methodist minister and a conscientious objector during WWII. Her mother, Barbara Ann Covington (1922–2004) was a homemaker and long-term supporter of the peace movement. In 1946, the family moved to Youngstown, Ohio, where John was pastor of Himrod Avenue Baptist Church.

On Christmas Eve of 1947, Barbara was hospitalised due to complications of an ectopic pregnancy. Carolyn was sent to live with her grandparents back in California while her mother recovered. The six-month separation allegedly took a toll on Carolyn; when left alone in her crib, she would cry inconsolably. It was several weeks before her separation-anxiety seemed to be under control.

In 1949, the Moore family returned to California. John was a pastor in numerous locales throughout Northern California, including Del Paso Heights, Hayward, and Chico. Two more daughters were born: Rebecca (1951) and Annie (1954). Carolyn appeared to be a happy child, making friends at school and church.

Throughout her school years, Carolyn was a high achiever with an active social life. She was concerned with social justice and identified as a Communist. In 1963, she graduated high school in Chico. She worked for the summer as an elevator operator in San Francisco. The following fall, she began her education at UC Davis.

== Davis ==
As a student at UC Davis, Carolyn majored in international relations and was on the college honor roll. She spent her junior year of college in Bordeaux, France, as an exchange student and became engaged to a Frenchman, Alexandre. Carolyn informed her friends and family of her plans to marry Alexandre and remain in France, studying philosophy. The engagement was dissolved, however.

Carolyn returned to Davis, where she shared a house with seven girlfriends. One of these friends introduced Carolyn to Larry Layton, a fellow student and conscientious objector to the Vietnam War. The Moores were surprised by Carolyn's relationship with Larry, who seemed comparatively quiet and passive. The couple married in the summer of 1967 and Carolyn adopted Layton as her surname.

While Larry completed his studies, Carolyn started a teaching credential. She was working as a student teacher at Vacaville High School when Dr. Martin Luther King, Jr was assassinated. Layton was shocked when her students started cheering at the news.

The following summer, Larry began alternate civilian service at the state mental hospital in Talmage, Mendocino County. Carolyn found a job as a physical education and social studies teacher at Potter Valley High School. Larry also worked as a substitute teacher in Ukiah Unified School District, which included Potter Valley High.When Potter Valley High was closed, she taught French at Ukiah High School in nearby Ukiah. (Student of hers at PVHS 1968–1970).The couple left Davis and moved to Potter Valley, not far from Ukiah.

== Peoples Temple and Jim Jones ==
Carolyn and Larry started church-shopping in Ukiah. Within a month, she was writing to her parents about her progressive new church, Peoples Temple. John Moore was disturbed by what he perceived as the worshipful tone of the letters, particularly with regard to the Temple's pastor, Jim Jones. After a prolonged period of not hearing from their daughter, the Moores visited Potter Valley, where they discovered that Layton was living alone. Larry had gone to Reno to arrange a quickie divorce. Furthermore, she had a black eye and had started keeping a rifle beside her bed.

Layton telephoned Jones to come over and meet her parents. Together, they informed the Moores that they were in love. They claimed that Jones' wife of twenty years, Marceline, was unable to respond to him sexually and that Jones couldn't get a divorce, due to Marceline's purported mental illness. After the meeting, John Moore concluded of Jones: "A phony preacher. Another Elmer Gantry."

Over the years, Layton continued to write letters to her family, extolling Jones' virtues and defending the relationship. She also claimed that Jones was the reincarnation of Vladimir Lenin and she of Lenin's mistress, Inessa Armand.

Some who were close to Carolyn Layton noted a change in her personality after she began her affair with Jones. She went from an amusing and free-thinking young woman to a "ruthless authoritarian". While never occupying a public position within the Temple, she became known as Jones' "Go to Guy". Her intimate relationship with Jones was concealed from the Temple's wider membership. But Jones encouraged his children to view Layton as a stepmother of sorts, taking her with them on family outings where the group often enjoyed luxuries that were forbidden to the Temple's rank-and-file. A 1974 affidavit by Marceline Jones requested that all her mothering responsibilities be taken on by Layton in the event of her death.

In 1972, Carolyn's youngest sister, Annie, visited the Temple and was convinced to stay.

In 1974, Carolyn asked her parents if she could live with them in Berkeley for a few months; she was pregnant with Jones' child. During her pregnancy, Layton pressured her father to perform her wedding by proxy to a Temple member named Mike Prokes, which he did, so that her child would be legitimate. On January 31, 1975, Carolyn gave birth to a son, named Jim Jon Prokes – nicknamed 'Kimo'.

Later that year, Layton resumed her responsibilities within the Temple. Her period of absence was explained as the result of an imprisonment in Mexico while on a secret mission for the Temple. Kimo's paternity was initially attributed to a prison guard. Later, Jones revised his story, telling his followers that he'd accidentally impregnated Carolyn while training her to "use her body for the Cause".

Layton was one of an elite group of staff who had access to the Temple's financial assets. Along with other members of this group, she was responsible for moving thousands of dollars into offshore accounts, making real estate investments, and setting up dummy business fronts.

In mid-1977, the publication of a critical article in New West magazine prompted Jones to permanently relocate to what became known as the Peoples Temple Agricultural Project in Guyana. Over the following two months, more than one thousand of his followers joined him there, including Carolyn and their son.

== Jonestown ==
Layton and Jones began to live together more openly in Jonestown, sharing a cabin. Her sister Annie and another lover and aide of Jones', Maria Katsaris, also shared their quarters. Also living there were Layton's son Kimo and John Victor Stoen. Jones claimed to have fathered Stoen with Grace, a former Temple member.

Layton divided her time between Jonestown and the Temple's headquarters in Georgetown, Guyana, where she often worked as a shortwave radio operator. She also taught in Jonestown's high school, which the community founded.. Together with Harriet Tropp and Johnny Brown Jones, Layton was one of Jonestown's "Administrative Triumvirate". They supervised the activities of eight department heads.

Along with members of Jonestown's medical staff, Layton was aware of Jones' abuse of pharmaceuticals. In 1978, she was observed shooting him up with a substance he claimed was Vitamin B-12.

Layton is believed to have been the author of a memo entitled 'An Analysis of Future Prospects', estimated to have been written in the weeks preceding November 18, 1978. The memo discusses several options for the people of Jonestown in the face of mounting pressures on the community, including (but not limited to) a "final stand" involving the deaths of the entire population.

Pathologists determined that Layton died of cyanide poisoning in Jones' cabin on November 18. Her body was one of only seven of the 909 fatalities in Jonestown to be autopsied.

== In media ==
The A&E documentary, Jonestown: The Women Behind the Massacre (2018), focused on four women who were close to Jim Jones, including Carolyn Moore Layton.

Australian author Laura Elizabeth Woollett's novel Beautiful Revolutionary is based largely on the life of Layton. Woollett fictionalises the protagonist as 'Evelyn Lynden'.

Episode 14 of Criminal Broads, a podcast about women on the wrong side of the law, closely covers Layton's story.
