= Old Reid Hospital =

- Interactive map of the Old Reid Hospital area

General information
- Status: Demolished
- Location: Richmond, Indiana
- Coordinates: 39°50′43.4″N 84°53′11.8″W

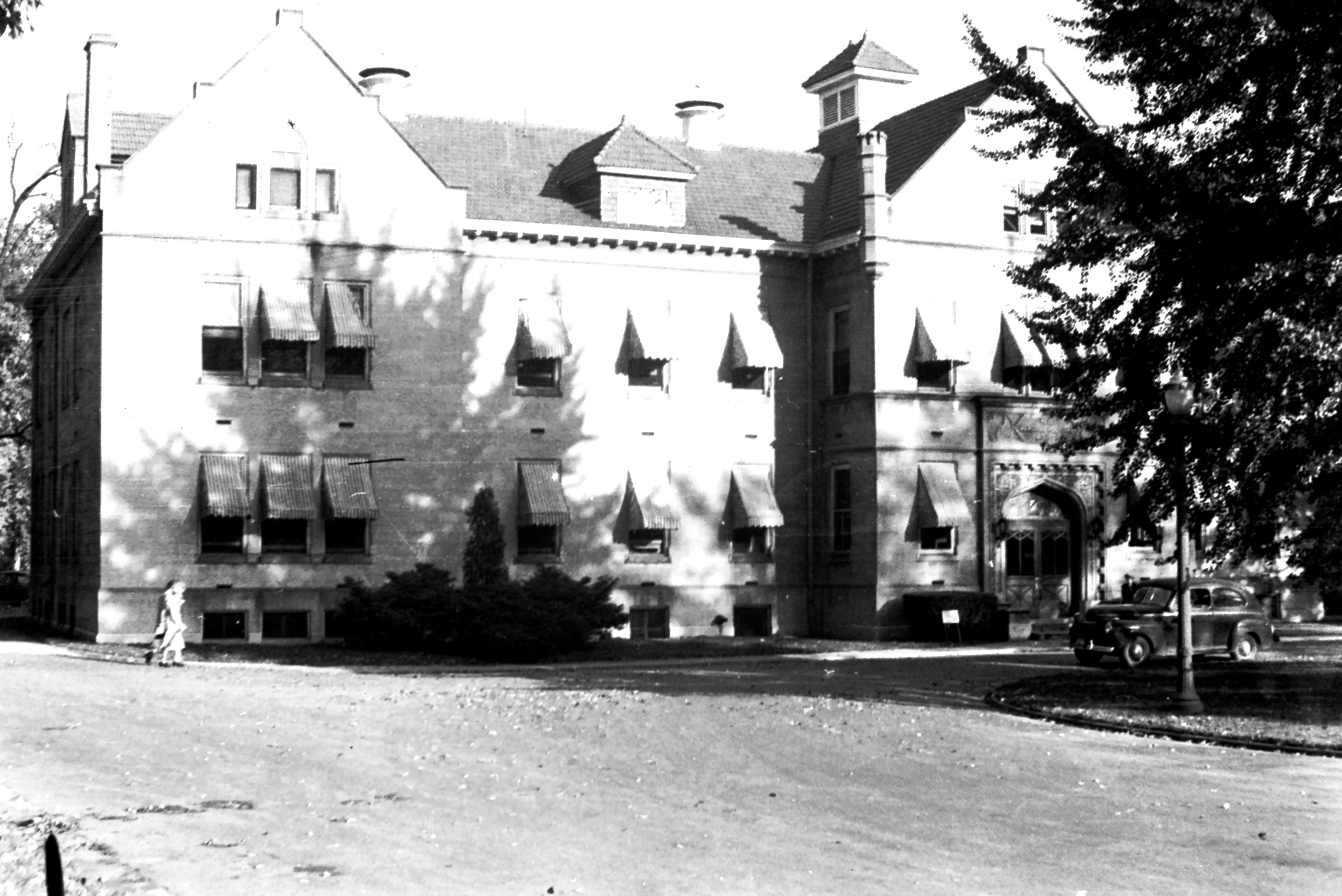
Old Reid Hospital, Richmond, Indiana c. 1949.jpg

The Old Reid Hospital was a former hospital building in Richmond, Indiana that previously housed Reid Hospital and Health Care Services. The hospital was founded in 1905 by Daniel Grey Reid. Hospital operations were later relocated to a new campus in Richmond, after which the original facility became known as Old Reid Hospital. The building was demolished in late 2018.

== History ==
The lack of adequate medical care at this time required many patients in Richmond to be treated in their own homes. Daniel Grey Reid lost both his wife, Ella, and son, Frank, who died before the hospital's construction. The hospital's dedication ceremony took place on July 27, 1905.
