= Orval Lee Jaggers =

American minister, writer, and scholar

- Born: January 8, 1916; Dardanelle, AR
- Died: January 10, 2004 (aged 88); Glendale, CA
- Resting place: Sanctuary of Prayer, Freedom Mausoleum, Forestlawn, Glendale, CA; 34.122272°N 118.234503°W
- Other names: O. L. Jaggers
- Occupations: Evangelist, Pastor
- Spouses: Ruby Opal Coppedge (1932), Julia Allene Wright (1936), Velma Jaggers (née Jaggers) (1957-2004)
- Children: Joan Jaggers and Larry Abernathy
- Parent(s): David B. Jaggers (1891 - 1968) and Fludie L. Jaggers (née Detrick, 1891 - 1976)

Orval Lee Jaggers (January 8, 1916 - January 10, 2004) was an American Christian minister, writer, and scholar. He was born in Dardanelle, Arkansas. He took part in the healing revival of the 1940s and 1950s and was an contributor to Voice of Healing magazine. Before the healing revival Jaggers was pastor of an Assemblies of God church. Jaggers' teaching focused on sensational topics that drew crowds to listen to him. Topics he spoke on included UFOs, space aliens, atomic bombs, and the communist threat. His teachings caused issues among his contemporary evangelists, and Gordon Lindsay and William Branham both urged him to teach on more traditional topics. Jaggers traveled widely holding campaign meetings around the United States and had both radio and television programs during the 1950s. Jaggers developed a following during the healing revival and started the World Church in Los Angeles, California in 1952 where he remained as pastor until his death.
