= William M. Branham =

American Christian minister (1909–1965)

The Reverend William M. Branham
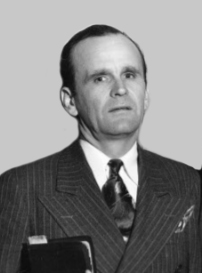
- Branham in 1947
- Born: William Marrion Branham; April 6, 1909; Burkesville, Kentucky, U.S.
- Died: December 24, 1965 (aged 56); Amarillo, Texas, U.S.
- Burial place: Jeffersonville, Indiana
- Occupation: Evangelist
- Spouses: Amelia Hope Brumbach (m. 1934; died 1937); Meda Marie Broy (m. 1941)
- Children: 5

Ecclesiastical career
- Religion: Baptist (1929–1946); Pentecostal (1946–1960); Nondenominational (1960–1965)

William Marrion Branham (April 6, 1909 – December 24, 1965) was an American Christian minister and faith healer who initiated the post-World War II healing revival, and claimed to be a prophet with the anointing of Elijah, who had come to prelude Christ's second coming. He is credited as "a principal architect of restorationist thought" for charismatics by some Christian historians, and has been called the "leading individual in the second wave of Pentecostalism." He made a lasting influence on televangelism and the modern charismatic movement, and his "stage presence remains a legend unparalleled in the history of the Charismatic movement". At the time they were held, Branham's inter-denominational meetings were the largest religious meetings ever held in some American cities. Branham was the first American deliverance minister to successfully campaign in Europe; his ministry reached global audiences with major campaigns held in North America, Europe, Africa, and India.

Branham claimed that he had received an angelic visitation on May 7, 1946, commissioning his worldwide ministry and launching his campaigning career in mid-1946. His fame rapidly spread as crowds were drawn to his stories of angelic visitations and reports of miracles happening at his meetings. His ministry spawned many emulators and set in motion the broader healing revival that later became the modern charismatic movement. At the peak of his popularity in the 1950s, Branham was widely adored and "the neo-Pentecostal world believed Branham to be a prophet to their generation". From 1955, Branham's campaigning and popularity began to decline as the Pentecostal churches began to withdraw their support from the healing campaigns for primarily financial reasons. By 1960, Branham transitioned into a teaching ministry.

Unlike his contemporaries, who followed doctrinal teachings known as the Full Gospel tradition, Branham developed an alternative theology which was primarily a mixture of Calvinist and Arminian doctrines, and had a heavy focus on dispensationalism and Branham's own unique eschatological views. While widely accepting the restoration doctrine he espoused during the healing revival, his divergent post-revival teachings were deemed increasingly controversial by his charismatic and Pentecostal contemporaries, who subsequently disavowed many of the doctrines as "revelatory madness". His closest followers accepted his sermons as oral scripture and referred to his teachings as "The Message". Despite Branham's objections, some followers of his teachings placed him at the center of a cult of personality during his final years.

Branham claimed that he had converted over one million people during his career. Branham died following a car accident in 1965. His teachings continued to be promoted by the William Branham Evangelistic Association, which reported that about two million people received its material in 2018.

== Early life ==
=== Childhood ===
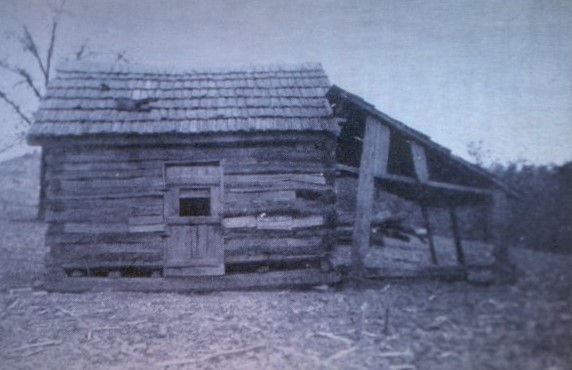
The dirt-floor log cabin that was William Marrion Branham's birthplace as shown in the biography William Branham: A Man Sent From God

William M. Branham was born near Burkesville, Kentucky, on April 6, 1909, (Note: Branham reported his name as William Marvin Branham on his October 16, 1940, registration with the United States Selective Service. In later years he reported his middle name as Marrion.) (Note: Branham's birthdate has also been reported to be April 6, 1907, and April 8, 1908.) the son of Charles and Ella Harvey Branham, the oldest of ten children. He claimed that at his birth, a "Light come [sic] whirling through the window, about the size of a pillow, and circled around where I was, and went down on the bed". Branham told his publicist Gordon Lindsay that he had mystical experiences from an early age; and that at age three he heard a "voice" speaking to him from a tree telling him "he would live near a city called New Albany". According to Branham, that year his family moved to Jeffersonville, Indiana. Branham also said that when he was seven years old, God told him to avoid smoking and drinking alcoholic beverages. Branham stated he never violated the command.

Branham told his audiences that he grew up in "deep poverty", often not having adequate clothing, and that his family was involved in criminal activities. Branham's neighbors reported him as "someone who always seemed a little different", but said he was a dependable youth. Branham explained that his tendency towards "mystical experiences and moral purity" caused misunderstandings among his friends, family, and other young people; he was a "black sheep" from an early age. Branham called his childhood "a terrible life."

Branham's father owned a farm near Utica, Indiana, and took a job working for O. H. Wathen, owner of R. E. Wathen Distilleries in nearby Louisville, Kentucky. Wathen was a supplier for Al Capone's bootlegging operations. Branham told his audiences that he was required to help his father with the illegal production and sale of liquor during prohibition. In March 1924, Branham's father was arrested for his criminal activities; he was convicted and sentenced to prison. The Indiana Ku Klux Klan claimed responsibility for attacking and shutting down the Jeffersonville liquor producing ring.

Branham was involved in a firearms incident and was shot in both legs in March 1924, at age 14; he later told his audiences he was involved in a hunting accident. Two of his brothers also suffered life-threatening injuries at the same time. Branham was rushed to the hospital for treatment. His family was unable to pay for his medical bills, but members of the Indiana Ku Klux Klan stepped in to cover the expenses. The help of the Klan during his impoverished childhood had a profound impact on Branham. Branham spoke highly of that act once in 1963, "the Ku Klux Klan, paid the hospital bill for me, Masons. I can never forget them. See? No matter what they do, or what, I still ... there is something, and that stays with me ...". Branham had connections to several KKK members and supporters in his early ministry.

=== Conversion and early influences ===
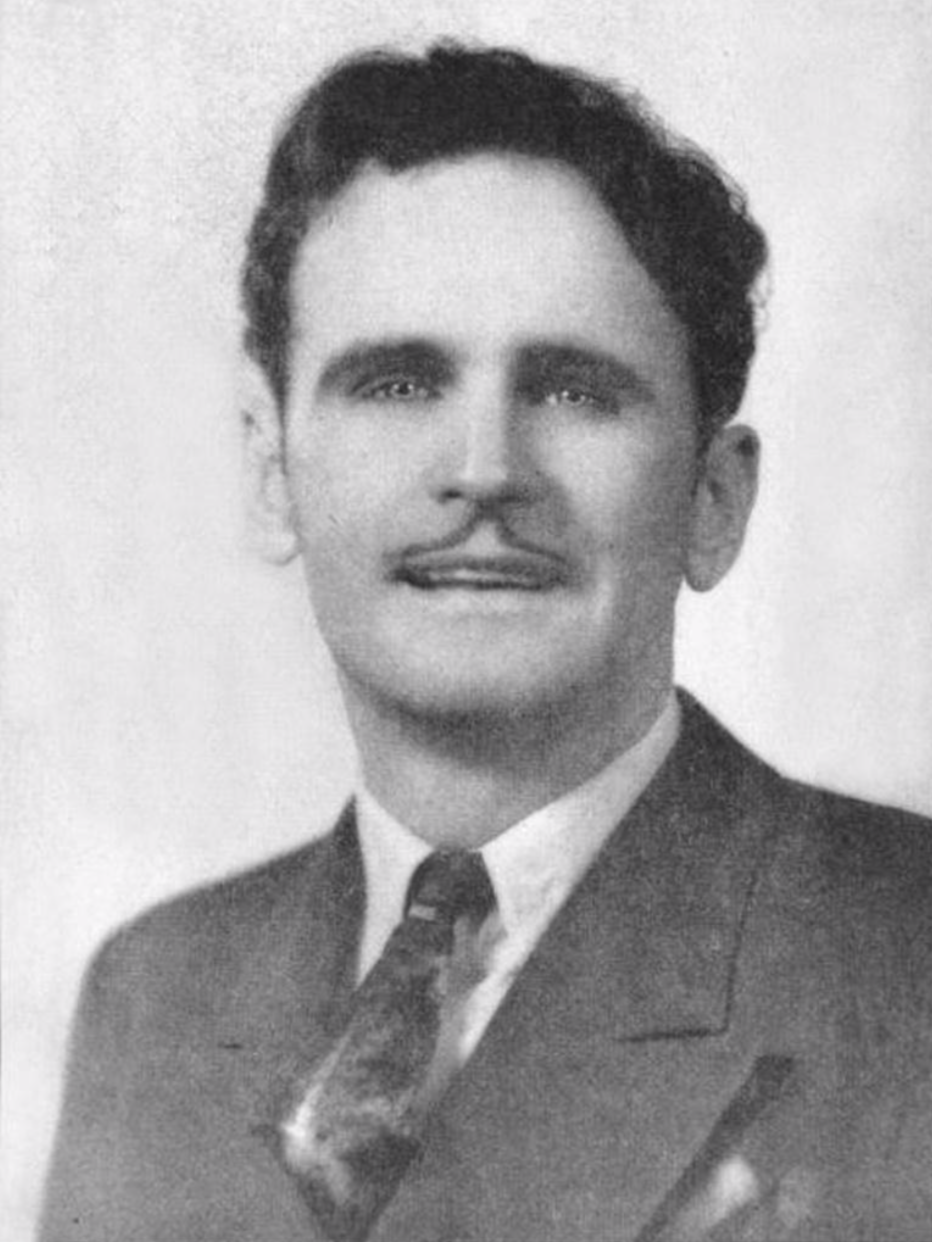
William Branham c. 1930

Branham told his audiences that he left home at age 19 in search of a better life, traveling to Phoenix, Arizona, where he worked on a ranch for two years and began a successful career in boxing. While Branham was away, his brother Edward aged 18, shot and killed a Jeffersonville man and was charged with murder. Edward died of a sudden illness only a short time later. Branham returned to Jeffersonville in June 1929 to attend the funeral. Branham had no experience with religion as a child; he said that the first time he heard a prayer was at his brother's funeral.

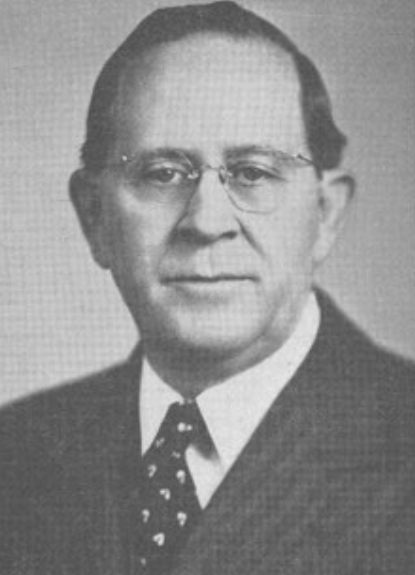
Roy Davis, who facilitated Branham's conversion

Soon afterward, while he was working for the Public Service Company of Indiana, Branham was overcome by gas and had to be hospitalized. Branham said that he heard a voice speaking to him while he was recovering from the accident, which led him to begin seeking God. Shortly thereafter, he began attending the First Pentecostal Baptist Church of Jeffersonville, where he converted to Christianity. The church was pastored by Roy Davis, a founding member of the second Ku Klux Klan and a leading recruiter for the organization. Davis later became the National Imperial Wizard (leader) of the KKK. Davis baptized Branham and six months later, he ordained Branham as an Independent Baptist minister and an elder in his church.

At the time of Branham's conversion, the First Pentecostal Baptist Church of Jeffersonville was a nominally Baptist church which adhered to some Pentecostal doctrines, including divine healing and speaking in tongues; Branham reported that his baptism at the church was done using the Jesus name formula of Oneness Pentecostalism. Branham claimed to have been opposed to Pentecostalism during the early years of his ministry. However, according to multiple Branham biographers, like Baptist historian Doug Weaver and Pentecostal historian Bernie Wade, Branham was exposed to Pentecostal teachings from his conversion.

Branham claimed to his audiences he was first exposed to a Pentecostal church in 1936, which invited him to join, but he refused. (Note: Pentecostalism is a renewal movement that started in the early 20th century that stresses a post-conversion baptism with the Holy Spirit for all Christians, with speaking in tongues ("glossolalia") as the initial evidence of this baptism.) Weaver speculated that Branham may have chosen to hide his early connections to Pentecostalism to make his conversion story more compelling to his Pentecostal audiences during the years of the healing revival. Weaver identified several parts of Branham's reported life story that conflicted with historical documentation and suggested that Branham began significantly embellishing his early life story to his audiences beginning in the 1940s.

During June 1933, Branham held tent revival meetings that were sponsored by Davis and the First Pentecostal Baptist Church. On June 2 that year, the Jeffersonville Evening News said the Branham campaign reported 14 converts. His followers believed his ministry was accompanied by miraculous signs from its beginning, and that when he was baptizing converts on June 11, 1933, in the Ohio River near Jeffersonville, a bright light descended over him and that he heard a voice say, "As John the Baptist was sent to forerun the first coming of Jesus Christ, so your message will forerun His second coming".

Belief in the baptismal story is a critical element of faith among Branham's followers. In his early references to the event during the healing revival, Branham interpreted it to refer to the restoration of the gifts of the spirit to the church. In later years, Branham significantly altered how he told the baptismal story, and came to connect the event to his teaching ministry. He claimed reports of the baptismal story were carried in newspapers across the United States and Canada. Because of the way Branham's telling of the baptismal story changed over the years, and because no newspaper actually covered the event, Weaver said Branham may have embellished the story after he began achieving success in the healing revival during the 1940s.

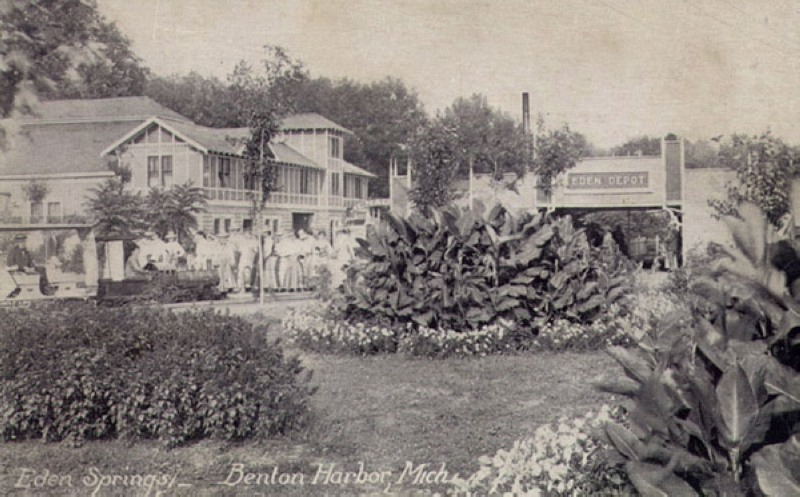
House of David commune in Michigan

Besides Roy Davis and the First Pentecostal Baptist Church, Branham reported interaction with other groups during the 1930s who were an influence on his ministry. During the early 1930s, he became acquainted with William Sowders' School of the Prophets, a Pentecostal group in Kentucky and Indiana. Through Sowders' group, he was introduced to the British Israelite House of David and in the autumn of 1934, Branham traveled to Michigan to meet with members of the group.

=== Early ministry ===
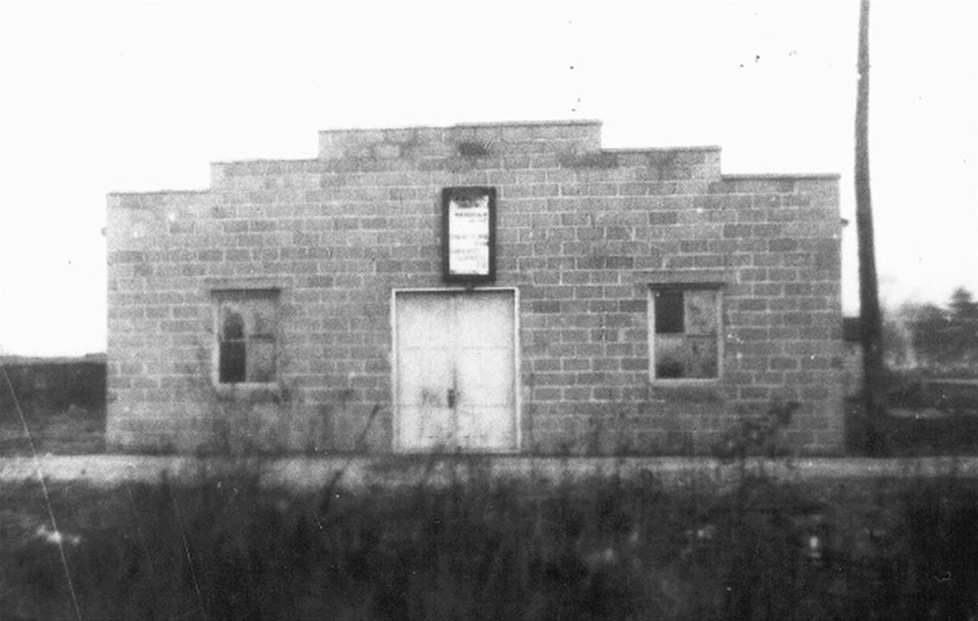
Billie Branham Pentecostal Tabernacle c. 1935

Branham took over leadership of Roy Davis's Jeffersonville church in 1934, after Davis was arrested again and extradited to stand trial. Sometime during March or April 1934, the First Pentecostal Baptist Church was destroyed by a fire and Branham's supporters at the church helped him organize a new church in Jeffersonville. At first Branham preached out of a tent at 8th and Pratt street, and he also reported temporarily preaching in an orphanage building.

By 1936, the congregation had constructed a new church on the same block as Branham's tent, at the corner of 8th and Penn street. The church was built on the same location reported by the local newspaper as the site of his June 1933 tent campaign. Newspaper articles reported the original name of Branham's new church to be the Pentecostal Tabernacle. The church was officially registered with the City of Jeffersonville as the Billie Branham Pentecostal Tabernacle in November 1936. Newspaper articles continued to refer to his church as the Pentecostal Tabernacle until 1943. Branham served as pastor until 1946, and the church name eventually shortened to the Branham Tabernacle. The church flourished at first, but its growth began to slow. Because of the Great Depression, it was often short of funds, so Branham served without compensation.

Branham continued traveling and preaching among Pentecostal churches while serving as pastor of his new church. In September 1934, he traveled to Mishawaka, Indiana where he was invited to speak at the Pentecostal Assemblies of Jesus Christ (PAJC) General Assembly meetings organized by Bishop G. B. Rowe.

Branham began dating Amelia Hope Brumbach (b. July 16, 1913) in 1933. Branham married Brumbach in June 1934. Their first child, William "Billy" Paul Branham (1935–2023) was born on September 13, 1935. Branham's wife became ill during the second year of their marriage. According to her death certificate, she was diagnosed with pulmonary tuberculosis in January 1936, beginning a period of declining health. Despite her diagnosis, the couple had a second child, Sharon Rose, who was born on October 27, 1936. In September 1936, the local news reported that Branham held a multi-week healing revival at the Pentecostal Tabernacle in which he reported eight healings.

The following year, disaster struck when Jeffersonville was ravaged by the Ohio River flood of 1937. Branham's congregation was badly impacted by the disaster and his family was displaced from their home. By February 1937, the floodwaters had receded, his church survived intact and Branham resumed holding services at the Pentecostal Tabernacle. Following the January flood, Hope's health continued to decline, and she succumbed to her illness and died on July 22, 1937. Sharon Rose, who had been born with her mother's illness, died four days later (July 26, 1937). Their obituaries reported Branham as pastor of the Pentecostal Tabernacle, the same church where their funerals were held.

Branham frequently related the story of the death of his wife and daughter during his ministry and evoked strong emotional responses from his audiences. Branham told his audiences that his wife and daughter had become suddenly ill and died during the January flood as God's punishment because of his failure to embrace Pentecostalism. Branham said he made several suicide attempts following their deaths. Peter Duyzer noted that Branham's story of the events surrounding the death of his wife and daughter conflicted with historical evidence; they did not die during the flood, he and his wife were both already Pentecostals before they married, and he was pastor of a Pentecostal church at the time of their deaths.

By the summer of 1940, Branham had resumed traveling and held revival meetings in other nearby communities. Branham married his second wife Meda Marie Broy in 1941, and together they had three children; Rebekah (1946–2014), Sarah (b. 1950), and Joseph (b. 1955).

== Healing revival ==
=== Background ===
Branham is known for his role in the healing revivals that occurred in the United States in the 1940s and 1950s, and most participants in the movement regarded him as its initiator. Christian writer John Crowder described the period of revivals as "the most extensive public display of miraculous power in modern history". Some, like Christian author and countercult activist Hank Hanegraaff, rejected the entire healing revival as a hoax and condemned the movement as cult in his 1997 book Counterfeit Revival.

Divine healing is a tradition and belief that was historically held by a majority of Christians but it became increasingly associated with Evangelical Protestantism. The fascination of most of American Christianity with divine healing played a significant role in the popularity and inter-denominational nature of the revival movement.

Branham held massive inter-denominational meetings, from which came reports of hundreds of miracles. Historian David Harrell described Branham and Oral Roberts as the two giants of the movement and called Branham its "unlikely leader."

=== Early campaigns ===
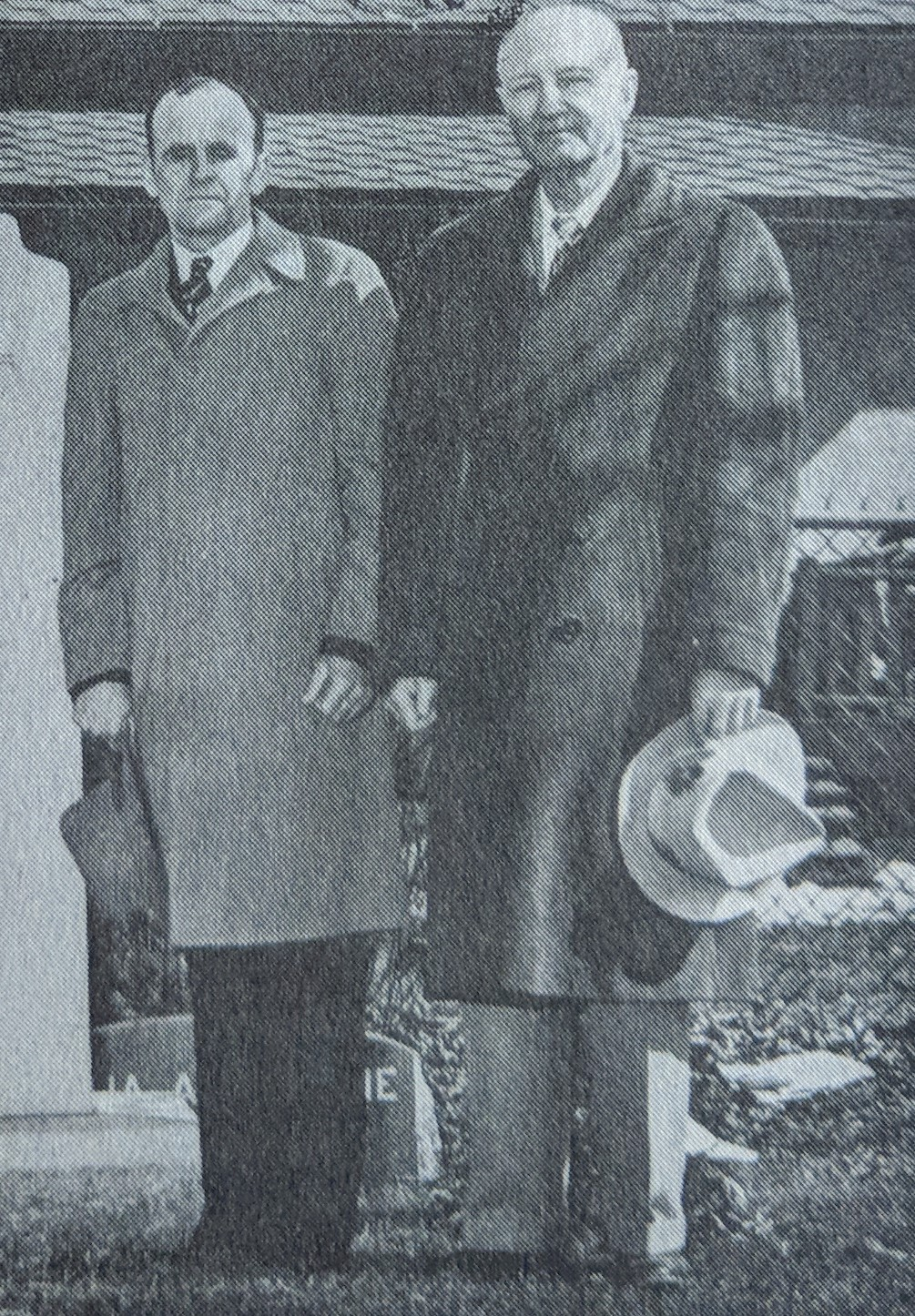
William Branham and F. F. Bosworth, c. 1950

Branham had been traveling and holding revival meetings since at least 1940 before attracting national attention. Branham's popularity began to grow following the 1942 meetings in Milltown, Indiana where it was reported that a young girl had been cured of tuberculosis. The news of the reported healing was slow to spread, but was eventually reported to a family in Missouri who in 1945 invited Branham to pray for their child who was suffering from a similar illness; Branham reported that the child recovered after his prayers.

News of two events eventually reached W. E. Kidson. Kidson was intrigued by the reported miracles and invited Branham to participate in revival meetings that he was organizing. W. E. Kidson, was editor of The Apostolic Herald and had many contacts in the Pentecostal movement. Kidson served as Branham's first campaign manager and was instrumental in helping organize Branham's early revival meetings.

Branham held his first large meetings as a faith healer in 1946. His healing services are well documented, and he is regarded as the pacesetter for those who followed him. At the time they were held, Branham's revival meetings were the largest religious meetings some American cities he visited had ever seen; reports of 1,000 to 1,500 converts per meeting were common.

Historians name his June 1946 St. Louis meetings as the inauguration of the healing revival period. Branham said he had received an angelic visitation on May 7, 1946, commissioning his worldwide ministry. In his later years, he also connected the angelic visitation with the establishment of the nation of Israel, at one point mistakenly stating the vision occurred on the same day. (Note: The United Nations debate on how to treat European Jewry following the Holocaust began in January 1946, with a committee recommending settling Jews in Palestine in April 1946. Britain announced its intention to divide Palestine in February 1947; the partition plan was adopted by the UN in November 1947, and State of Israel formally became a nation on May 14, 1948.) (Note: Pre-millennial dispensationalism views the establishing of a Jewish state as a sign of the imminent return of Christ.)

His first reported revival meetings of the period were held over 12 days during June 1946 in St. Louis. In 1947, Time magazine reported on a campaign conducted in Vandalia, IL, and according to the article, Branham drew a crowd of over 4,000 sick people who desired healing and recorded him diligently praying for each. Branham's fame began to grow as a result of the publicity and reports covering his meetings.

Herald of Faith magazine, which was edited by prominent Pentecostal minister Joseph Mattsson-Boze and published by Philadelphia Pentecostal Church in Chicago, also began following and exclusively publishing stories from the Branham campaigns, giving Branham wide exposure to the Pentecostal movement. Following the St. Louis meetings, Branham launched a tour of small Oneness Pentecostal churches across the Midwest and southern United States, from which stemmed reports of healing and one report of a resurrection. By August his fame had spread widely. He held meetings that month in Jonesboro, Arkansas, and drew a crowd of 25,000 with attendees from 28 different states. Branham's team struggled to find venues that could seat such large numbers.

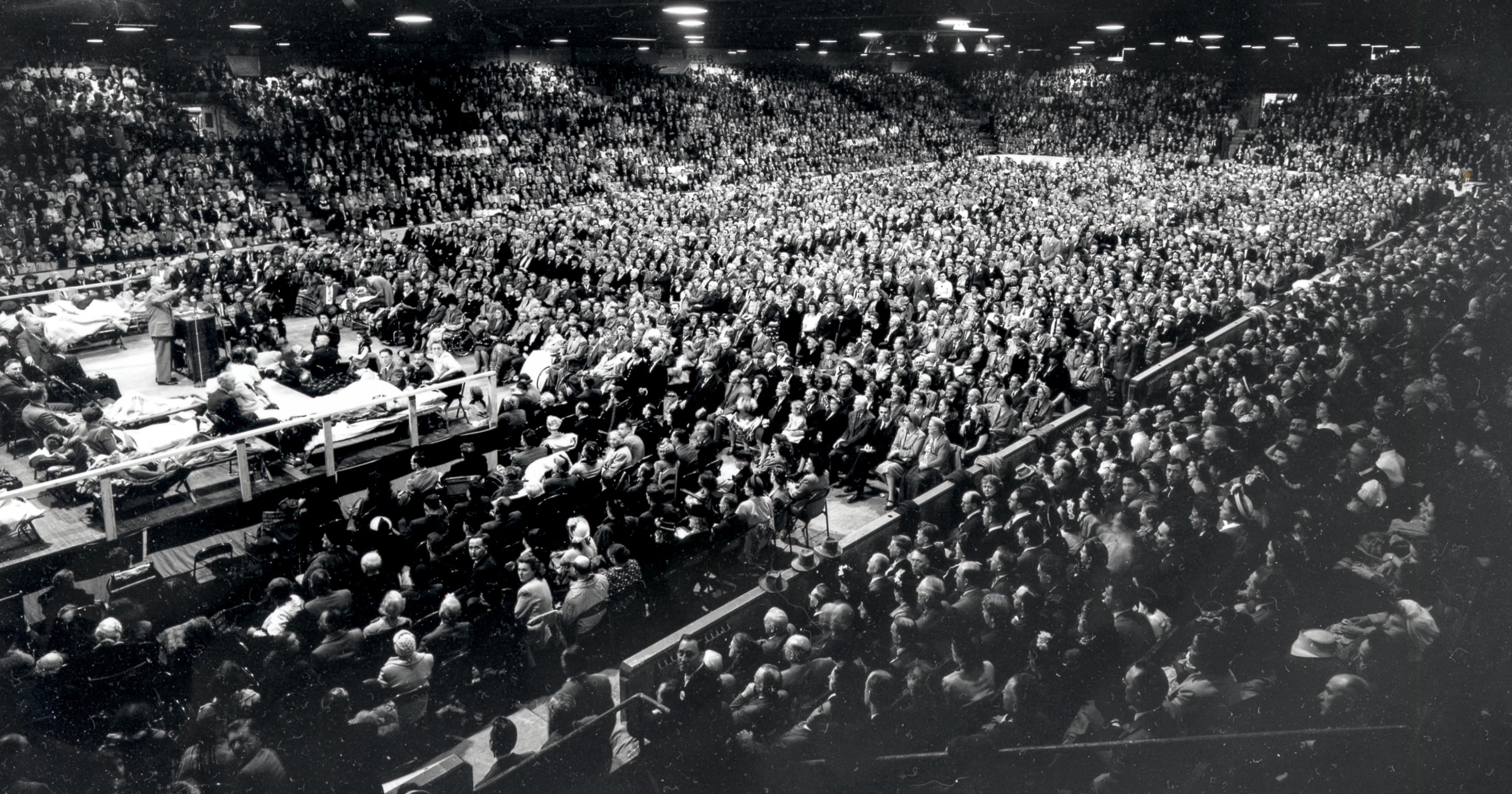
F. F. Bosworth counsels attendees on the doctrine of divine healing at a Branham Campaign meeting in Tacoma, Washington, April 1948.

Branham's revivals were interracial from their inception and were noted for their "racial openness" during the period of widespread racial unrest. An African American minister participating in the St. Louis meetings claimed to be healed during the revival, helping to bring Branham a sizable African American following from the early days of the revival. Branham held interracial meetings even in the southern states. To satisfy segregation laws when ministering in the south, Branham's team would use a rope to divide the crowd by race.

Author and researcher Patsy Sims noted that venues used to host campaign meetings also hosted KKK rallies just days prior to the revival meetings, which sometimes led to racial tensions. Sims, who attended both the KKK rallies and the healing revivals, was surprised to see some of the same groups of people at both events. According to Steven Hassan, KKK recruitment was covertly conducted through Branham's ministry.

After holding a very successful revival meeting in Shreveport during mid-1947, Branham began assembling an evangelical team that stayed with him for most of the revival period. The first addition to the team was Jack Moore and Young Brown, who periodically assisted him in managing his meetings. Following the Shreveport meetings, Branham held a series of meetings in San Antonio, Phoenix, and at various locations in California. Moore invited his friend Gordon Lindsay to join the campaign team, which he did beginning at a meeting in Sacramento, California, in late 1947.

Lindsay was a successful publicist and manager for Branham, and played a key role in helping him gain national and international recognition. In 1948, Branham and Lindsay founded Voice of Healing magazine, which was originally aimed at reporting Branham's healing campaigns. (Note: Voice of Healing was renamed Christ For the Nations in 1971) The story of Samuel the Prophet, who heard a voice speak to him in the night, inspired Branham's name for the publication. Lindsay was impressed with Branham's focus on humility and unity, and was instrumental in helping him gain acceptance among Trinitarian and Oneness Pentecostal groups by expanding his revival meetings beyond the United Pentecostal Church to include all of the major Pentecostal groups.

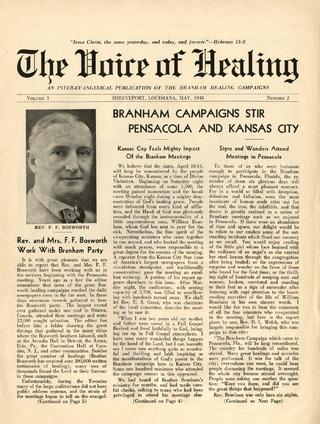
The April 1948 cover of Voice of Healing magazine

The first meetings organized by Lindsay were held in northwestern North America during late 1947. At the first of these meetings, held in Vancouver, British Columbia, Canadian minister Ern Baxter joined Branham's team. Lindsay reported 70,000 attendees to the 14 days of meetings and long prayer lines as Branham prayed for the sick. William Hawtin, a Canadian Pentecostal minister, attended one of Branham's Vancouver meetings in November 1947 and was impressed by Branham's healings. Branham was an important influence on the Latter Rain revival movement, which Hawtin helped initiate.

In January 1948, meetings were held in Florida; F. F. Bosworth met Branham at the meetings and also joined his team. Bosworth was among the pre-eminent ministers of the Pentecostal movement and a founding minister of the Assemblies of God; Bosworth lent great weight to Branham's campaign team. He remained a strong Branham supporter until his death in 1958. Bosworth endorsed Branham as "the most sensitive person to the presence and working of the Holy Spirit" he had ever met.

During early 1947, a major campaign was held in Kansas City, where Branham and Lindsay first met Oral Roberts. Roberts and Branham had contact at different points during the revival. Roberts said Branham was "set apart, just like Moses".

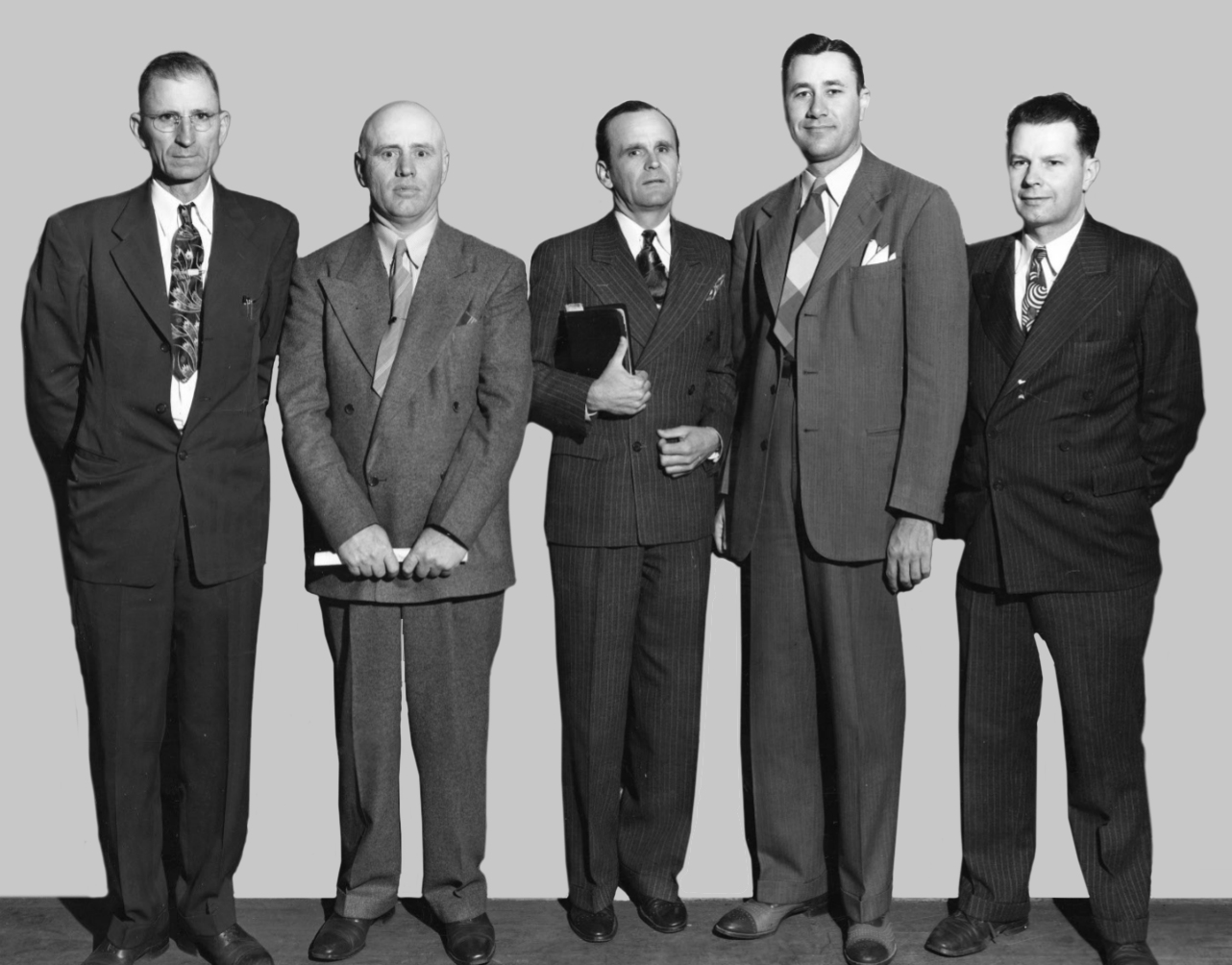
From left: Young Brown, Jack Moore, William Branham, Oral Roberts, Gordon Lindsay; photo taken at Kansas City in 1948

Branham spent many hours ministering and praying for the sick during his campaigns, and like many other leading evangelists of the time he suffered exhaustion. After one year of campaigning, his exhaustion began leading to health issues. Branham reported to his audiences that he suffered a nervous breakdown and required treatment by the Mayo Clinic. Branham's illness coincided with a series of allegations of fraud in his healing revivals. Attendees reported seeing him "staggering from intense fatigue" during his last meetings.

Just as Branham began to attract international attention in May 1948, he announced that due to illness he would have to halt his campaign. His illness shocked the growing movement, and his abrupt departure from the field caused a rift between him and Lindsay over the Voice of Healing magazine. Branham insisted that Lindsay take over complete management of the publication. With the main subject of the magazine no longer actively campaigning, Lindsay was forced to seek other ministers to promote. He decided to publicize Oral Roberts during Branham's absence, and Roberts quickly rose to prominence, in large part due to Lindsay's coverage.

Branham partially recovered from his illness and resumed holding meetings in October 1948; that month, he held a series of meetings around the United States without Lindsay's support. Branham's return to the movement led to his resumed leadership of it. In November 1948, he met with Lindsay and Moore and told them he had received another angelic visitation, instructing him to hold a series of meetings across the United States and then to begin holding meetings internationally. As a result of the meeting, Lindsay rejoined Branham's campaigning team.

=== Style ===
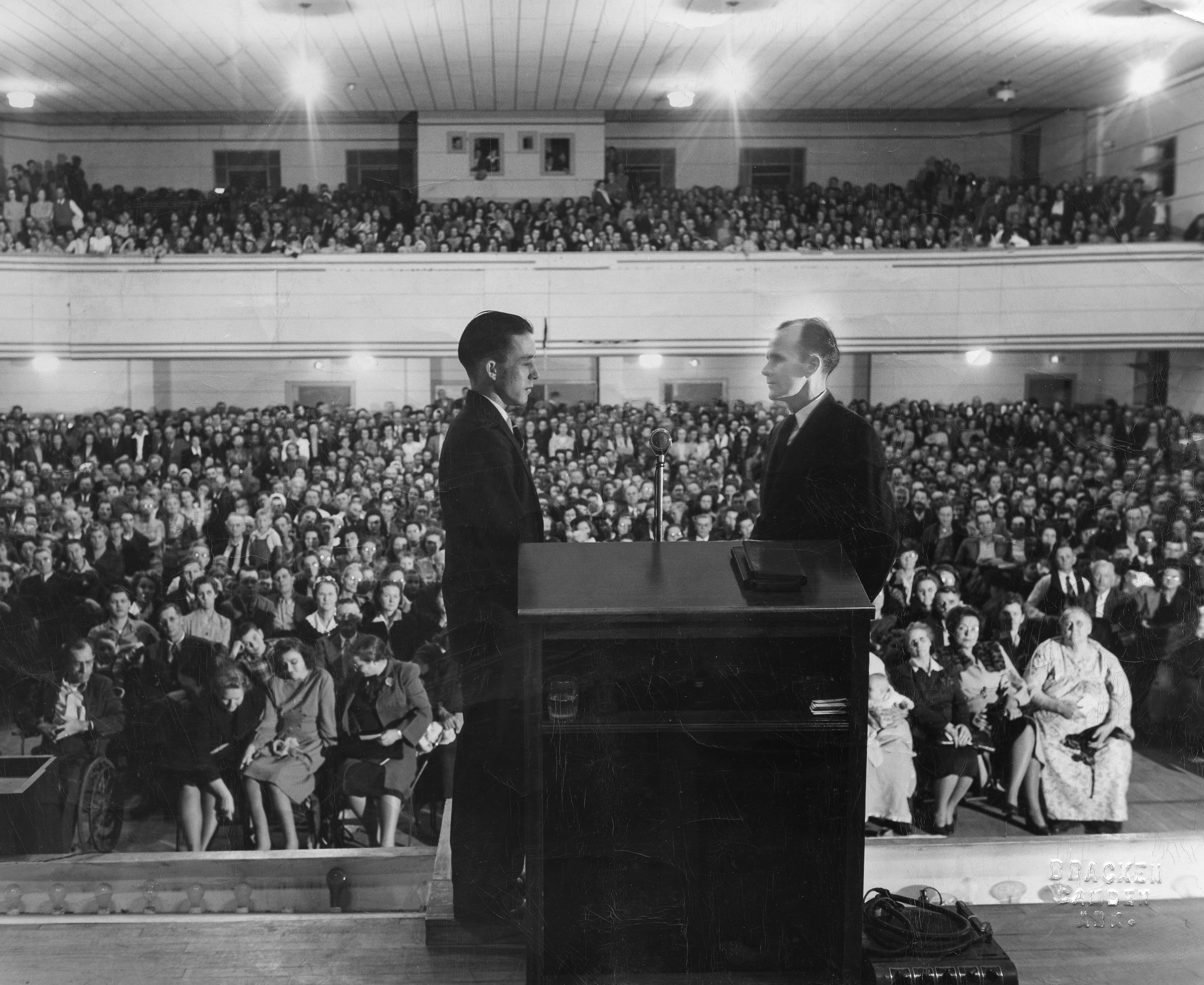
Branham at a healing campaign meeting

Most revivalists of the era were flamboyant but Branham was usually calm and spoke quietly, only occasionally raising his voice. His preaching style was described as "halting and simple", and crowds were drawn to his stories of angelic visitation and "constant communication with God". Branham tailored his language usage to best connect to his audiences. When speaking to poor and working-class audiences, he tended to use poor grammar and folksy language; when speaking to more educated audiences and ministerial associations, he generally spoke using perfect grammar and avoided slang usage.

He refused to discuss controversial doctrinal issues during the healing campaigns, and issued a policy statement that he would only minister on the "great evangelical truths". He insisted his calling was to bring unity among the different churches he was ministering to and to urge the churches to return to the roots of early Christianity.

In the first part of his meetings, one of Branham's companion evangelists would preach a sermon. Ern Baxter or F. F. Bosworth usually filled this role, but other ministers like Paul Cain also participated in Branham's campaigns in later years. Baxter generally focused on bible teaching; Bosworth counseled supplicants on the need for faith and the doctrine of divine healing. Following their build-up, Branham would take the podium and deliver a short sermon, in which he usually related stories about his personal life experiences.

Branham would often request God to "confirm his message with two-or-three faith inspired miracles". Supplicants seeking healing were issued numbered prayer cards by Branham's campaign team on which they could fill out their name and affliction; Branham or his campaign team would select a number of prayer cards to be prayed for personally by Branham and organized a prayer line. After completing his sermon, he would proceed with the prayer line where he would pray for the sick. Branham would often tell supplicants what they suffered from, their name, and their address. In some cases members of Branham's campaign team would collect the card from the supplicant to confirm Branham's diagnosis after they were prayed for by Branham.

He would pray for each of them, pronouncing some or all healed. Branham generally prayed for a few people each night and believed witnessing the results on the stage would inspire faith in the audience and permit them to experience similar results without having to be personally prayed for. Branham would also call out a few members still in the audience, who had not been accepted into the prayer line, stating their illness and pronouncing them healed.

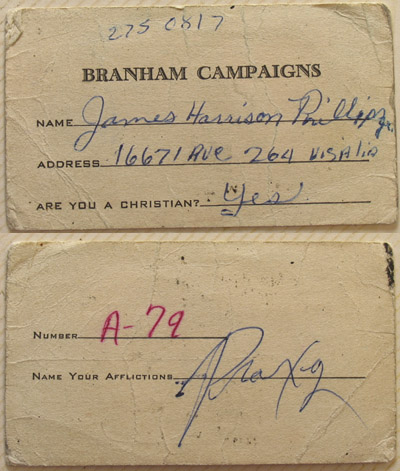
Prayer card from a William Branham healing campaign

Branham told his audiences that he was able to determine their illness, details of their lives, and pronounce them healed as a result of an angel who was guiding him. Describing Branham's method, Bosworth said "he does not begin to pray for the healing of the afflicted in body in the healing line each night until God anoints him for the operation of the gift, and until he is conscious of the presence of the Angel with him on the platform. Without this consciousness he seems to be perfectly helpless."

Branham explained to his audiences that the angel that commissioned his ministry had given him two signs by which they could prove his commission. He described the first sign as vibrations he felt in his hand when he touched a sick person's hand, which communicated to him the nature of the illness, but did not guarantee healing. Branham's use of what his fellow evangelists called a word of knowledge gift separated him from his contemporaries in the early days of the revival.

This second sign did not appear in his campaigns until after his recovery in 1948, and was used to "amaze tens of thousands" at his meetings. As the revival progressed, his contemporaries began to mirror the practice. According to Bosworth, this gift of knowledge allowed Branham "to see and enable him to tell the many events of [people's] lives from their childhood down to the present".

This caused many in the healing revival to view Branham as a "seer like the old testament prophets". Branham amazed even fellow evangelists, which served to further push him into a legendary status in the movement. Branham's audiences were often awestruck by the events during his meetings. At the peak of his popularity in the 1950s, Branham was widely adored and "the neo-Pentecostal world believed Branham to be a prophet to their generation".

=== Growing fame and international campaigns ===
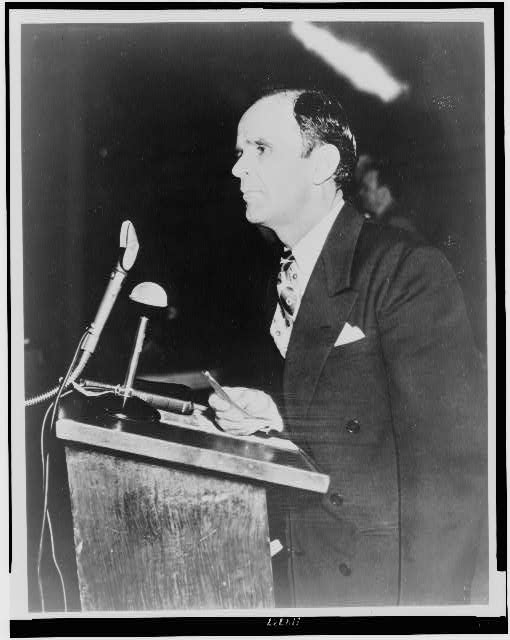
Light over Rev. William Branham's Head

In January 1950, Branham's campaign team held their Houston campaign, one of the most significant series of meetings of the revival. The location of their first meeting was too small to accommodate the approximately 8,000 attendees, and they had to relocate to the Sam Houston Coliseum. On the night of January 24, 1950, Branham was photographed with a light above his head during a debate between Bosworth and local Baptist minister W. E. Best regarding the theology of divine healing. Bosworth argued in favor, while Best argued against. The photograph showed a light above Branham's head, which he and his associates believed to be supernatural. The photograph became well-known in the revival movement and is regarded by Branham's followers as an iconic relic. Branham believed the light was a divine vindication of his ministry; others believed it was a glare from the venue's overhead lighting.

In January 1951, former US Congressman William Upshaw was sent by Roy Davis to a Branham campaign meeting in California. (Note: And he said, "Well, I was the president of the Southern Baptist Convention." said, "Dr. Davis, the one that ordained you in the Baptist church, was the one who sent me here to see you." William Branham, February 17, 1954 – Jesus On The Authority Of The Word) Upshaw had limited mobility for 59 years as the result of an accident, and said he was miraculously healed in the meeting. The publicity of the event took Branham's fame to a new level. Upshaw sent a letter describing his healing claim to each member of Congress. The Los Angeles Times reported on the healing in an article titled "Ex-Rep. Upshaw Discards Crutches After 59 Years". Upshaw explained to reporters that he had been able to walk two or three steps without the aid of his crutches prior to attending Branham's meeting, but following Branham's prayer his strength increased so that he had walked four blocks. Upshaw died in November 1952, at the age of 86.

According to Pentecostal historian Rev. Walter Hollenweger, "Branham filled the largest stadiums and meeting halls in the world" during his five major international campaigns. Branham held his first series of campaigns in Europe during April 1950 with meetings in Finland, Sweden, and Norway. Attendance at the meetings generally exceeded 7,000 despite resistance to his meetings by the state churches. Branham was the first American deliverance minister to successfully tour in Europe.

A 1952 campaign in South Africa had the largest attendance in Branham's career, with an estimated 200,000 attendees. According to Lindsay, the altar call at his Durban meeting received 30,000 converts. During international campaigns in 1954, Branham visited Portugal, Italy, and India. Branham's final major overseas tour in 1955 included visits to Switzerland and Germany.

Branham's meetings were regularly attended by journalists, who wrote articles about the miracles reported by Branham and his team throughout the years of his revivals, and claimed patients were cured of various ailments after attending prayer meetings with Branham. Durban Sunday Tribune and The Natal Mercury reported wheelchair-using people rising and walking. Winnipeg Free Press reported a girl was cured of deafness. El Paso Herald-Post reported hundreds of attendees at one meeting seeking divine healing. Despite such occasional glowing reports, most of the press coverage Branham received was negative.

=== Allegations of fraud ===
To his American audiences, Branham claimed several high profile events occurred during his international tours. Branham claimed to visit and pray for King George VI while en route to Finland in 1950. He claimed the king was healed through his prayers. Researchers found no evidence that Branham ever met King George; King George was chronically ill and died about a year after Branham claimed to heal him.

Branham also claimed to pray for and heal the granddaughter of Florence Nightingale at a London airport. Branham's campaign produced photos of an emaciated woman who they claimed to be Nightingale's granddaughter. However, Florence Nightingale never married and had no children or grandchildren. Investigators of Branham's claim were unable to identify the woman in the photograph.

Branham similarly claimed to pray for King Gustaf V while in Sweden in April 1950. Investigators found no evidence for the meeting; King Gustaf V died in October 1950. Branham claimed to stop in Egypt in 1954 while en route to India to meet with King Farouk; however Farouk had been deposed in 1952 and was not living in Egypt at the time. Branham claimed to visit the grave of Buddha while in India, however Buddha was cremated and had no grave. In total, critics of Branham identified many claims which appeared to be false when investigated. Weaver accused Branham of major embellishments.

Branham faced criticism and opposition from the early days of the healing revival, and he was repeatedly accused of fraud throughout his ministry. According to historian Ronald Kydd, Branham evoked strong opinions from people with whom he came into contact; "most people either loved him or hated him". Kydd stated that it "is impossible to get even an approximate number of people healed in Branham's ministry." No consistent record of follow-ups of the healing claims were made, making analysis of many claims difficult to subsequent researchers. Additionally, Branham's procedures made verification difficult at the time of his revivals. Branham believed in positive confession. He required supplicants to claim to be healed to demonstrate their faith, even if they were still experiencing symptoms. He frequently told supplicants to expect their symptoms to remain for several days after their healing. This led to people professing to be healed at the meetings, while still suffering from the condition. Only follow up after Branham's waiting period had passed could ascertain the result of the healing.

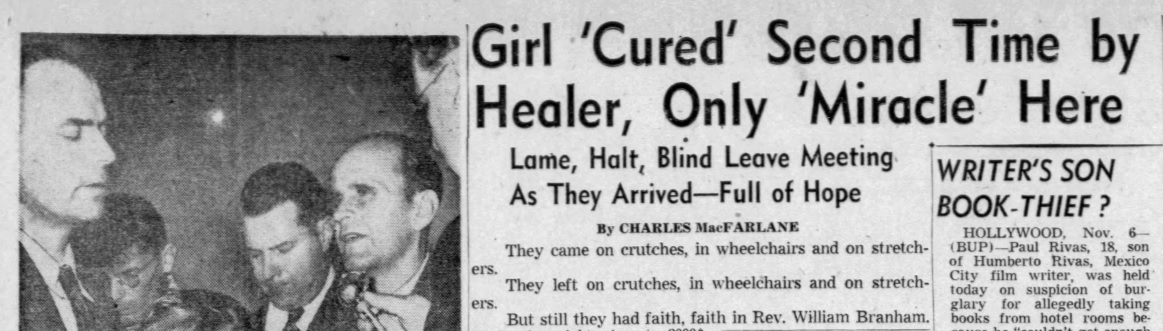
A 1947 Vancouver Sun Headline about Branham Campaign

From the early days of the healing revival, Branham received overwhelmingly unfavorable coverage in the news media, which was often quite critical. At his June 1947 revivals in Vandalia, Illinois, the local news reported that Beck Walker, a man who was deaf and mute from birth, was pronounced healed but failed to recover. Branham claimed Walker failed to recover his hearing because he had disobeyed Branham's instruction to stop smoking cigarettes. Branham was lambasted by critics who asked how it was possible the deaf man could have heard his command to stop smoking.

At his 1947 meetings in Winnipeg, Branham claimed to have raised a young man from the dead at a Jeffersonville funeral parlor. Branham's sensational claim was reported in the news in the United States and Canada, leading to a news media investigation to identify the funeral home and the individual raised from the dead. Reporters subsequently found no evidence of a resurrection; no funeral parlor in the city corroborated the story. The same year the news media in Winnipeg publicized Branham's cases of failed healing. In response, the churches which hosted Branham's campaign conducted independent follow-up interviews with people Branham pronounced healed to gather testimonies which they could use to counter the negative press. To their surprise, their investigation failed to confirm any cases of actual healing; every person they interviewed had failed to recover.

At meetings in Vancouver during 1947, newspaper reporters discovered that one young girl had been in Branham's prayer lines in multiple cities posing as a cripple, but rising to walk after Branham pronounced her healed each time. An investigative reporter suspected Branham had staged the miracle. Reporters at the meeting also attempted to follow up on the case of a Calgary woman pronounced healed by Branham who had died shortly after he left the city. Reporters attempted to confront Branham over these issues, but Branham refused to be interviewed.

Branham was also accused of fraud by fellow ministers and churches that hosted his meetings. In 1947, Rev. Alfred Pohl, the Missionary-Secretary of Pentecostal Assemblies of Canada, served as Branham's guide and host at meetings across western Canada. Pohl stated that many people Branham pronounced as healed later died and produced witnesses to validate his allegations. Pohl stated that the numerous deaths "severely tested the faith" of many ministers who had trusted in Branham. Pohl also claimed Branham was frequently given and accepted large financial gifts from individuals who he pronounced as healed, including those who subsequently died.

In 1948, W. J. Taylor, a district superintendent with the Pentecostal Assemblies of Canada, raised concerns again following another wave of Branham meetings and asked for a thorough investigation. Taylor presented evidence that claims of the number of people healed were vastly overestimated, and that multiple people pronounced healed by Branham had subsequently died. While he stated his personal admiration for Branham, the troubling number of deaths led him to suggest "there is a possibility that this whole thing is wrong".

Churches in Canada continued to experience crises following Branham campaign meetings as they attempted to explain the numerous failed healings to their congregations. At meetings in Regina, Branham pronounced the wife of a prominent minister healed of cancer. The minister and his wife were overjoyed, and the minister excitedly shared the details of the healing with his radio audience in Ontario later that week. To his surprise, his wife died only days later of her illness. The confusion created by the situation led ministers to claim Branham had deceived them.

According to Kydd, "the controversy surrounding Branham deepened" with time. Kydd reported that by watching films of the revival meetings, "the viewer would assume almost everyone was healed", but "results were less promising whenever follow-up was made." One such case was Carol Strubler, who at age nine in 1954 was prayed for by Branham at a recorded revival in Washington, D.C., when he preached a sermon entitled "The Deep Calleth Unto The Deep". One newspaper reported, "Rev. William Branham of Jeffersonville, Ind., prayed for her and assured the heartbroken mother her daughter would live. A week later the mother told this newspaper she was confident the evangelist's words were true and had cancelled a scheduled visit to St. Christopher's Hospital in Philadelphia." However, Strubbler died "of acute leukemia, just three weeks after [Branham] told her mother she was healed of the fatal sickness." Another case was four-year-old Donny Morton, who was diagnosed with a rare brain condition (subdural hydroma). At meetings in Costa Mesa, California, during June 1951, Branham prayed for Morton, telling his father, "For with faith in God’s power, and help from the medical world, your little son will live.” After multiple surgeries were reported to be successful by doctors in June and July 1951, the child subsequently died on November 1 after contracting pneumonia during recovery. His story was published in Reader's Digest.

Similar allegations came from Branham's European campaigns. Rev. Walter Hollenweger, who served as a translator on Branham's European tours, reported that "very few were actually healed" in the campaigns, and the overwhelming majority pronounced healed by Branham failed to recover. Hollenweger said that while there were a few "well-attested cases of miraculous healing", Branham was "naïve" and "dishonest" and misled his audiences when he reported the number of people healed. Hollenweger was disappointed that Branham refused to acknowledge the numerous failed pronouncements of healings.

In 1955, Leonard Steiner, pastor of a Pentecostal church in Zurich Switzerland that hosted a Branham meeting reported cases of failed healing and the negative consequences for members of his congregation. Allegations in Norway led authorities to limit Branham's ability to hold meetings; the Directorate of Health forbade Branham from laying hands on the sick and sent police to his meetings to enforce the order.

Serious allegations also were made following Branham's meetings in South Africa during 1952 and complaints were lodged with government authorities. Michael Plaff, a doctor, was pronounced healed of cancer by Branham during one meeting. In February 1952, the Branham campaign published an article claiming Plaff had visited the hospital the day after he was prayed for and his cure was confirmed by medical tests. However, Plaff had died of his cancer just days after being pronounced healed. A minister attending meetings in Durban with his congregation reported that over twenty people suffering from tuberculosis were pronounced healed by Branham, but all failed to recover. In another case, a woman suffering a heart condition was pronounced healed by Branham, but died less than a week later. A 23-year-old leukemia patient was pronounced healed by Branham, but failed to recover and died about thirteen months later.

The Branham campaign published a book, A Prophet Visits South Africa, to publicize the success of the tour. The book related the details of dozens of healings. Investigators in South Africa followed up on the reported healings and found that 46 of the people Branham said had been healed had failed to recover. After reviewing the results of the investigation, one minister concluded "that the cures claimed are so largely exaggerated as to be almost fraudulent in their claim." When Branham attempted to visit South Africa again in 1965, the South African government placed restrictions on his visa preventing him from holding any healing revivals while he was in the country.

Ern Baxter, who participated in most of Branham's campaigns between November 1947 and 1953 including his tours to India and Europe, reflected on the exaggerated reports of miracles in the healing revival in a 1978 interview. He explained that the allegations eroded the trust of the crowds who attended the healing services.

I remember in the beginning of the healing movement, simply to report a healing would produce great jubilation and praise from congregations. However, the cynicism became so deep that the people's confidence was diminished. Even to this day, people are affected. People began to circulate healing testimonies which, when they were checked out by reputable journalists and reporters, even those who were friendly to the movement, were found to be false. The percentage of healings that stood up after investigation was embarrassingly low.

— Ern Baxter

Some attendees of Branham's meetings believed that some healings were staged and accused him of selectively choosing who could enter the prayer line. Some people left his meetings disappointed after finding Branham's conviction that everyone in the audience could be healed without being in the prayer line proved incorrect. Branham generally attributed the failure of supplicants to receive healing to their lack of faith. According to Pohl, Hollenweger, and Steiner, Branham's practice of blaming the supplicant for lack of faith was severely damaging in multiple churches and left many people who failed to receive healing in despair.

Their expectations had been raised so high, only to be dashed after all the excitement was over. Some seemed to experience a momentary relief from pain, but all too many would discover no lasting benefit. And by that time the healer would be too far away to be questioned or to explain. The sick person would then simply be forced to accuse himself of lack of faith, or in some cases, throw his faith overboard.

— Alfred Pohl

The "word of knowledge" gift used by Branham was also subject to much criticism. Hollenweger investigated Branham's use of the "word of knowledge gift" and found no instances in which Branham was mistaken in his often-detailed pronouncements. Criticism of Branham's use of this gift was primarily around its nature; some asserted that it was a non-Christian practice and accused him of witchcraft and telepathy. Branham was openly confronted with such criticisms and rejected the assertions.

Others alleged that Branham's discernments were not genuine. Many people Branham prayed for were required to first write their name, address, and what they were seeking prayer for on prayer cards. The cards were submitted to Branham's team who would choose the supplicants to be prayed for by Branham and organize the prayer line. Some critics accused Branham's team of sharing prayer card information with Branham before he began his prayer lines.

=== Financial difficulties ===
In 1955, Branham's campaigning career began to slow following financial setbacks. Even after he became famous, Branham continued to wear inexpensive suits and refused large salaries; he was not interested in amassing wealth as part of his ministry and was reluctant to solicit donations during his meetings. During the early years of his campaigns, donations had been able to cover costs, but from 1955, donations failed to cover the costs of three successive campaigns, one of which incurred a $15,000 deficit ($175,658 in 2024 dollars).

Some of Branham's business associates thought he was partially responsible because of his lack of interest in the financial affairs of the campaigns, and tried to hold him personally responsible for the debts. Branham briefly stopped campaigning and said he would have to take a job to repay the debt, but the Full Gospel Business Men's Fellowship International ultimately offered financial assistance to cover the debt. Branham became increasingly reliant on the Full Gospel Businessmen to finance his campaign meetings as the Pentecostal denominations began to withdraw their financial support.

Finances became an issue again in 1956 when the Internal Revenue Service (IRS) charged Branham with tax evasion. The American government targeted the other leading revivalists with lawsuits during the same time period, including Oral Roberts, Jack Coe, and A. A. Allen. The IRS asserted income reported by the ministers as non-taxable gifts was taxable, despite the fact Branham had not kept the gifts for himself. Except Allen, who won his legal battle, the evangelists settled their cases out of court.

The IRS investigation showed Branham did not pay close attention to the amount of money flowing through his ministry, and had failed to document gifts and donations he received or how the proceeds were used. It also revealed that others assisting in his campaigns were taking financial advantage of the campaigns. Branham reported his annual salary to the IRS as $7,000 ($80,770 in 2024 dollars) while his manager Gordon Lindsay's was reported at $80,000. ($923,084 in 2024 dollars) Comparatively, Oral Roberts earned a salary of $15,000 in the same years. Branham's case was eventually settled out of court when Branham admitted to tax evasion and agreed to pay a $40,000 penalty. ($461,542 in 2024 dollars) Branham was never able to completely pay off the tax liability.

=== End of the revival ===
By the mid-1950s, dozens of the ministers associated with Branham and his campaigns had launched similar healing campaigns. In 1956, the healing revival reached its peak, as 49 separate evangelists held major meetings. Branham and Lindsay ineffectively attempted to encourage the other evangelists to help their local churches rather than launch national careers. The Branham campaign held meetings across the United States in 1956, and a large meeting in Mexico City that had 20,000 in attendance. However the swelling number of competitors and emulators were further reducing attendance at Branham's meetings.

His correspondence also decreased sharply. Whereas he had once received "a thousand letters a day", by 1956 his mail dropped to 75 letters a day. Branham thought the decline was temporary. He continued expecting something greater, which he said "nobody will be able to imitate". In 1955, he reported a vision of a renewed tent ministry and a "third pull which would be dramatically different" from his earlier career; he began to increasingly refer to the vision as his popularity began to decline.

Amid the financial issues in 1956, Lindsay left Branham's campaign team. Branham eventually criticized the Voice of Healing magazine which he had helped create as a "massive financial organization" that put making money ahead of promoting good. The loss of Lindsay as a manager and the publicity of Voice of Healing was a major setback for Branham. After 1956, attendance at Branham's meetings dwindled and his appeal became limited to the loyal following that developed around him during the earlier years. Branham came to depend on The Herald of Faith published by Joseph Mattsson-Bose as his primary publicity tool for the final years of his ministry.

Branham also began to criticize other leading contemporaries in the healing revival leading to open hostilities between the evangelists. In 1957 Branham openly criticized A. A. Allen concerning the validity of a miracle reported in his campaigns. Allen replied by circulating a letter at the Christian Fellowship Convention criticizing Branham for creating divisions and suggesting Branham may soon die as a result of his actions. Branham also began to criticize Oral Roberts and Billy Graham. The bad feelings and breakdown of cooperation between the leaders of the movement contributed to the end of the healing revival.

In the closing years of the revival, Branham helped launch and popularize the ministry of Jim Jones, the founder and leader of the Peoples Temple. According to historian Catherine Wessinger, while rejecting Christianity as a false religion, Jones covertly used popular Christian figures to advance his own ideology. Jones needed a religious headliner to endorse his ministry and invited Branham to share the platform with him at a self-organized religious convention held at the Cadle Tabernacle auditorium in Indianapolis from June 11 to 15, 1956.

Branham critics Peter Duyzer and John Collins reported that Branham "performed numerous miracles", drawing a crowd of 11,000. Branham was an important influence on Jones, who copied many of his styles, methods, and teachings. Jones later became known for the mass murder and suicide at Jonestown in November 1978.

According to Collins, Jim Jones and Paul Schäfer were influenced to move to South America by Branham's 1961 prophecy concerning the destruction of the United States in a nuclear war. Jones later said that he and Branham "did not see eye to eye", and accused Branham of being disingenuous. (Note: Jones ultimately rejected all of Christianity as "fly away religion", rejected the Bible as being a tool to oppress women and non-whites, and denounced the Christian God as a "Sky God" who was "no God at all". Historian Catherine Wessinger concludes Jones used Christianity as a vehicle to covertly advance his personal ideology)

Consensus among historians is that the healing revival ended in 1958. By 1960, the number of evangelists holding national campaigns dropped to 11. Several perspectives on the decline of the healing revival have been offered. Crowder suggested Branham's gradual separation from Gordon Lindsay played a major part in the decline. Harrell attributed the decline to the increasing number of evangelists crowding the field and straining the financial resources of the Pentecostal denominations.

Weaver agreed that Pentecostal churches gradually withdrew their support for the healing revival, mainly over the financial stresses put on local churches by the healing campaigns. The Assemblies of God were the first to openly withdraw support from the healing revival in 1953. Weaver pointed to other factors that may have helped destroy the initial ecumenism of the revival; tension between the independent evangelists and the Pentecostal churches caused by the evangelists' fund-raising methods, denominational pride, sensationalism, and doctrinal conflicts – particularly between the Oneness and Trinitarian factions within Pentecostalism. Weaver also believed that "fraud and chicanary" by the revivals evangelists also played a major role in the decline.

== Branhamism and decline ==
As the healing revival began to wane, many of Branham's contemporaries moved into the leadership of the emerging Charismatic movement, which emphasized use of spiritual gifts. The Charismatic movement is a global movement within both Protestant and non-Protestant Christianity that supports the adoption of traditionally Pentecostal beliefs, especially the spiritual gifts (charismata). The movement began in the teachings of the healing revival evangelists and grew as their teachings came to receive broad acceptance among millions of Christians.

At the same time the Charismatic movement was gaining broad acceptance, Branham began to transition to a teaching ministry. He began speaking on the controversial doctrinal issues he had avoided for most of the revival. By the 1960s, Branham's contemporaries and the Pentecostal denominations that had supported his campaigns regarded him as an extremely controversial teacher.

The leadership of the Pentecostal churches pressed Branham to resist his urge to teach and to instead focus on praying for the sick. Branham refused, arguing that the purpose of his healing ministry was to attract audiences and, having thus been attracted, it was time to teach them the doctrines he claimed to have received through supernatural revelation. Branham argued that his entire ministry was divinely inspired and could not be selectively rejected or accepted, saying, "It's either all of God, or none of God."

At first, Branham taught his doctrines only within his own church at Jeffersonville, but beginning in the 1960s he began to preach them at other churches he visited. His criticisms of Pentecostal organizations, and especially his views on holiness and the role of women, led to his rejection by the growing Charismatic movement and the Pentecostals from whom he had originally achieved popularity. Branham acknowledged their rejection and said their organizations "had choked out the glory and Spirit of God". As a result of their view of his teachings, many Pentecostals judged that Branham had "stepped out of his anointing" and had become a "bad teacher of heretical doctrine".

Despite his rejection by the growing Charismatic movement, Branham's followers became increasingly dedicated to him during his later life. Some even claimed he was the Messiah, treated him as deity, and began to baptize and pray in his name. Branham quickly condemned their belief as heresy and threatened to stop ministering, but the belief persisted. Many followers moved great distances to live near his home in Jeffersonville and, led by Leo Mercer, subsequently set up a colony in Arizona following Branham's move to Tucson in 1962.

Many believed the rapture was imminent and that it was necessary to be near Branham in Arizona to take part. Branham lamented Mercer and the actions of his group as he worried that a cult was potentially being formed among his most fanatical followers. Before he died, some of his followers had already begun compiling his sermons and treating them as oral scripture, with a significant minority of his followers believing in his divinity.

His followers refer to his teachings collectively as "The Message". Outsiders have referred to his teachings as Branhamism and Branhamology.

== Later life and death ==
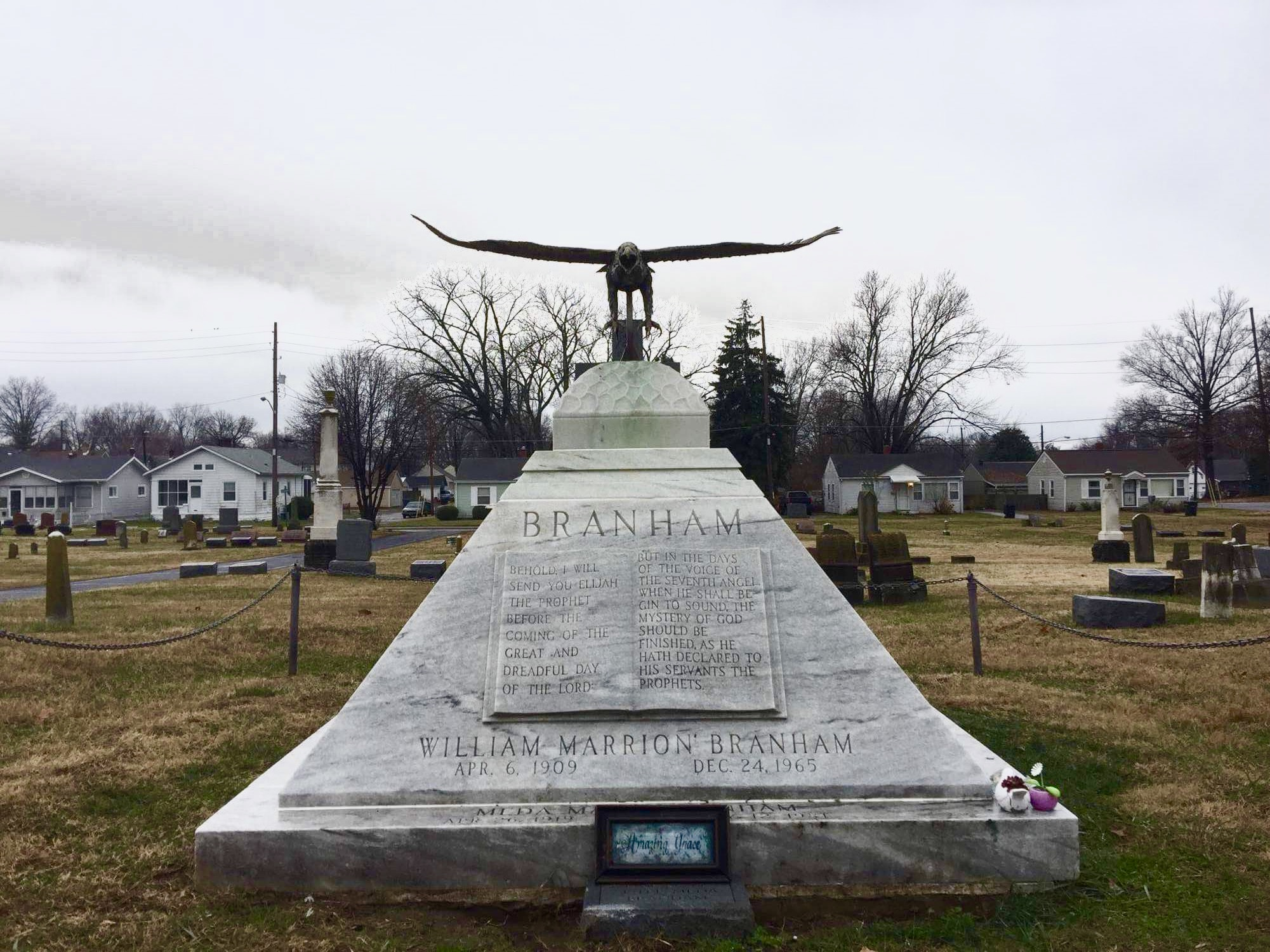
Branham's pyramid grave stone

Branham continued to travel to churches and preach his doctrine across Canada, the United States, and Mexico during the 1960s. His only overseas trip during the 1960s proved a disappointment. Branham reported a vision of himself preaching before large crowds and hoped for its fulfillment on the trip, but the South African government prevented him from holding revivals when he traveled to the country in 1965. Branham was saddened that his teaching ministry was rejected by all but his closest followers.

Pentecostal churches which once welcomed Branham refused to permit him to preach during the 1960s, and those who were still sympathetic to him were threatened with excommunication by their superiors if they did so. He held his final set of revival meetings in Shreveport at the church of his early campaign manager Jack Moore in November 1965. Although he had hinted at it many times, Branham publicly stated for the first time that he was the return of Elijah the prophet in his final meetings in Shreveport.

On December 18, 1965, Branham and his family – except his daughter Rebekah – were returning to Jeffersonville, Indiana, from Tucson for the Christmas holiday. About three miles (4.8 km) east of Friona, Texas, and about seventy miles (110 km) southwest of Amarillo on US Highway 60, just after dark, a car driven by a drunken driver traveling westward in the eastbound lane collided head-on with Branham's car. He was rushed to the hospital in Amarillo where he remained comatose for several days and died of his injuries on Christmas Eve, December 24, 1965.

Branham's death stunned the Pentecostal world and shocked his followers. In the confusion immediately following Branham's death, expectations that he would rise from the dead developed among his followers. Many believed he would have to return to fulfill a vision he had regarding future tent meetings. Weaver attributed the belief in Branham's imminent resurrection to Pearry Green, though Green denied it. Even Branham's son Billy Paul seemed to expect his father's resurrection and indicated as much in messages sent to Branham's followers, in which he had communicated his expectation for a resurrection on Easter Sunday 1966.

Branham's funeral was held on December 29, 1965, but his burial was delayed until April 11, 1966, Easter Monday. Most eulogies only tacitly acknowledged Branham's controversial teachings, focusing instead on his many positive contributions and recalling his wide popularity and impact during the years of the healing revival. James Gordon Lindsay's eulogy stated that Branham's death was the will of God and privately he accepted the interpretation of Kenneth E. Hagin, who claimed to have prophesied Branham's death two years before it happened. According to Hagin, God revealed that Branham was teaching false doctrine and God was removing him because of his disobedience.

Among his followers, the expectation of Branham's resurrection remained strong into the 1970s, in part based on Branham's prediction that the rapture could occur by 1977. After 1977, some of his followers abandoned his teachings.

== Legacy and influence ==
Branham was the "initiator of the post-World War II healing revival" and, along with Oral Roberts, was one of its most revered leaders. Branham is most remembered for his use of the "sign-gifts" that awed the Pentecostal world. According to writer and researcher Patsy Sims, "the power of a Branham service and his stage presence remains a legend unparalleled in the history of the Charismatic movement." The many revivalists who attempted to emulate Branham during the 1950s spawned a generation of prominent Charismatic ministries.

Branham has been called the "principal architect of restorationist thought" of the Charismatic movement that emerged from the healing revival. The Charismatic view that the Christian church should return to a form like that of the early church has its roots in Branham's teachings during the healing revival period. The belief is widely held in the modern Charismatic movement, and the legacy of his restorationist teaching and ministering style is evident throughout televangelism and the Charismatic movement.

The more controversial doctrines Branham espoused in the closing years of his ministry were rejected by the Charismatic movement, which viewed them as "revelatory madness". (Note: Charismatic writer Michael Moriarty stated, "Branham's aberrational teachings not only cultivated cultic fringe movements like the Latter Rain Movement and the Manifested Sons of God, but they also paved a pathway leading to false predictions, revelatory madness, doctrinal heresies, and a cultic following that treated his sermons as oral scriptures".) Charismatics are apologetic towards Branham's early ministry and embrace his use of the "sign-gifts". Charismatic author John Crowder wrote that his ministry should not be judged by "the small sliver of his later life", but by the fact that he indirectly "lit a fire" that began the modern Charismatic movement. Non-Charismatic Christianity completely rejected Branham. (Note: Hanegraaff in Counterfeit Revival condemned the entire evangelical movement as a cult and singled out Branham, saying his "failed prophecies were exceeded only by his false doctrine" in infamy.)

Crowder said Branham was a victim of "the adoration of man" because his followers began to idolize him in the later part of his ministry. Harrell took a similar view, attributing Branham's teachings in his later career to his close friends, who manipulated him and took advantage of his lack of theological training. Weaver also attributed Branham's eschatological teachings to the influence of a small group of his closest followers, who encouraged his desire for a unique ministry. According to Weaver, to Branham's dismay, his followers had placed him at the "center of a Pentecostal personality cult" in the final years of his ministry.

Edward Babinski describes Branham's followers as "odd in their beliefs, but for the most part honest hard-working citizens", and wrote that calling them a cult "seems unfair". While rejecting Branham's teachings, Duyzer offered a glowing review of Branham's followers, stating he "had never experienced friendship, or love like we did there". Though Branham is no longer widely known outside Pentecostalism, his legacy continues today. Summarizing the contrasting views held of Branham, Kydd stated, "Some thought he was God. Some thought he was a dupe of the devil. Some thought he was an end-time messenger sent from God, and some still do."

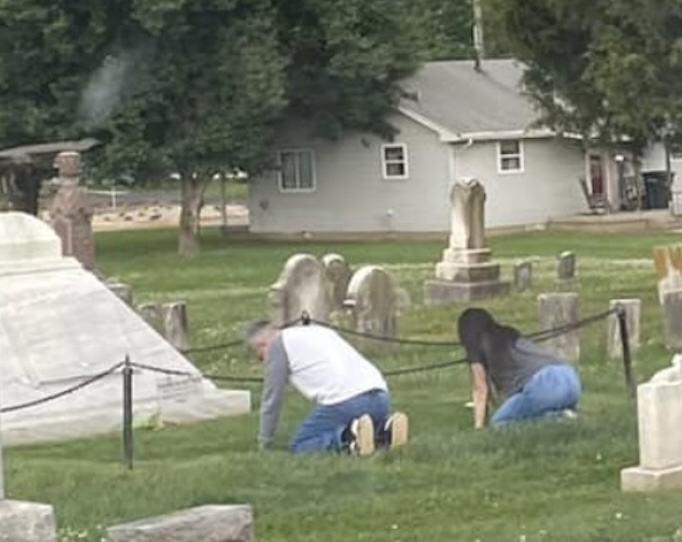
Worshippers bowing at the grave of William Branham in Jeffersonville, Indiana

Followers of Branham's teachings can be found around the world; Branham claimed to have made over one million converts during his campaign meetings. In 1986, there were an estimated 300,000 followers. (Note: Weaver based his estimate on numbers reported by Branham's son. The estimate included 50,000 in the United States, with a considerable following in Central and South America (including 40,000 in Brazil), India, and Africa; particularly in Kenya, Nigeria, Ghana, and the Democratic Republic of the Congo.) In 2000, the William Branham Evangelical Association had missions on every inhabited continent – with 1,600 associated churches in Latin America and growing missions across Africa. In 2018, Voice of God Recordings claimed to serve Branham-related support material to about two million people through the William Branham Evangelical Association, and estimated there were 2–4 million total followers of Branham's teachings.

Branham's followers do not have a central unifying leadership. Shortly after Branham's death, his followers divided in multiple feuding groups. Many different followers of Branham's teachings have claimed to be his immediate successor, or an Elisha to his Elijah. Many also believe that Branham's son Joseph has claimed the inheritance of his father's ministry. Each of the men claiming to be his successor have established new sects of Branham's followers. His followers "range widely in belief in practice." Some followers have attempted to reform Branham's most extreme teachings. While most churches adhere to a common set of tenets, the "extreme local authority" of the church promoted by Branham has led to widespread differences in interpretation of Branham's prophetic teachings. One common theme among all groups is the belief that Branham was the return of Elijah the prophet and receiving his prophetic revelations is necessary to escape the impending destruction of the world. Some groups of Branham's followers refuse medical treatment because of their divine healing beliefs. Many followers of Branham's teachings live within insular communities, with their own schools and with no access to television or internet or outside media. Some groups prohibit their members from having relationships with outsiders. Those who leave are often shunned or disowned. People who try to leave the teachings of Branham often face extreme repercussions. Carl Dyck wrote, "Those who have come out of this group give solemn evidence of the devastating effect that Branhamism had on them, both emotionally and psychologically. In fact, the followers of Branham pray that evil will come upon people who leave their church." Branham's followers have harassed critics and individuals who reject Branham's teachings. Dyck reported that people who published material critical of Branham's teachings have been threatened by his followers and warned they may be killed. The news media have also reported critics of Branham's teaching being threatened and harassed by his followers.

In his book Churches that Abuse, Ronald Enroth wrote that some churches use Branham's teachings to "belittle, insult, and berate" their members as part of their discipleship teachings on submission, humility, and obedience. According to Enroth, Branham's followers believe subjecting themselves to this treatment is necessary for them to "be refined and perfect" and "ready to meet Jesus" at this second coming. Enroth reported instances of families being separated, with children being taken from their parents and reassigned to other families to be raised as a form of discipline. He also reported multiple cases of physical abuse against both adults and children in the United States and Mexico.

Branham's followers are widely spread throughout the world. In Iran, Branham's followers have faced persecution, with the government shutting down ten of their house churches in 2018 and jailing several Branham followers. In 2020, the Russian government labeled missionaries of Branham's teaching as "extremists" and banned the importation of Branham-related publications to the Russian Federation.
