= Jack Moore (preacher) =

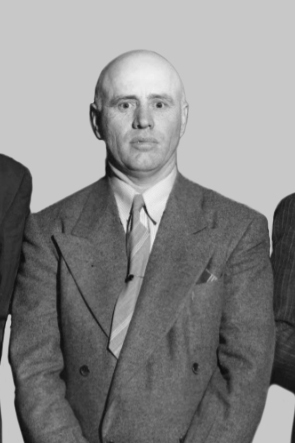
Jack Moore at Kansas City in 1948

Reverend Jack Moore (June 24, 1905 – November 18, 1975) was an American minister and home builder from Shreveport, Louisiana. He was the founding pastor of Life Tabernacle Church, as well as a Director and key supporter to Full Gospel Business Men’s International. He campaigned during the Healing Revival of the 1950s as a minister and manager for William Branham. He worked with and supported Gordon Lindsay to produce the Voice of Healing magazine which subsequently transitioned into Christ for the Nations in 1971. The library at Christ for the Nations Institute, Jack Moore Hall, is named in his honor.
