= Healing revival =

Christian revival movement

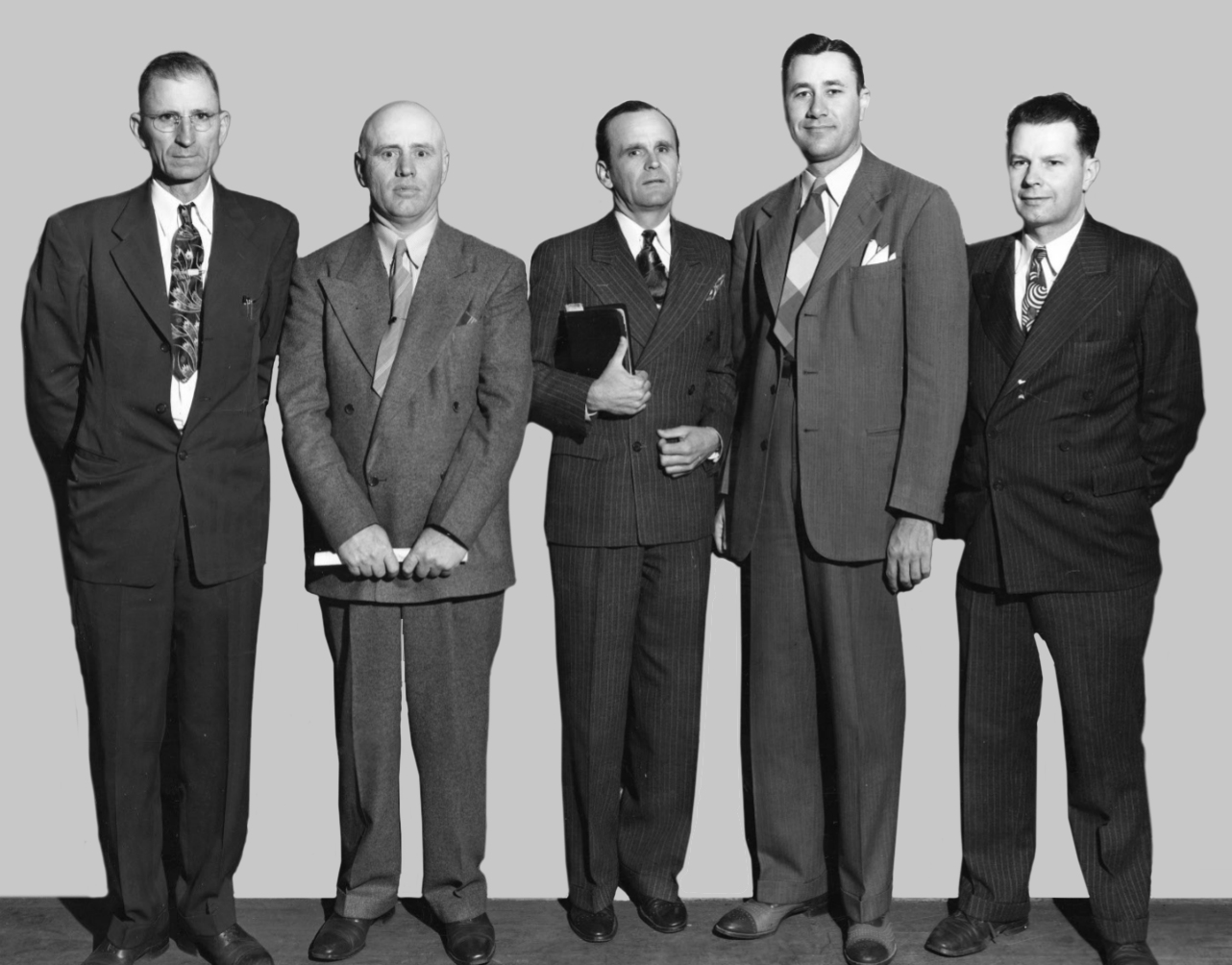
From left: Young Brown, Jack Moore, William Branham, Oral Roberts, Gordon Lindsay; photo taken at a revival meeting Kansas City in 1948

The Healing Revival is a term used by many American Charismatics in reference to a Christian revival movement that began in June 1946 and continued through the 1950s. The Healing Revival sparked the Latter Rain movement in 1948 and the two movements were interrelated. The period of revival was a significant influence on the modern charismatic movement.

== Evangelists ==
The period of revivals was described by Christian writer John Crowder as "the most extensive public display of miraculous power in modern history. " Some, like critic and radio personality Hank Hanegraaff, rejected the entire healing revival as a hoax, and condemned the subsequent evangelical and charismatic movements as a cult. Divine healing is a tradition and belief that became increasingly associated with Evangelical Protestantism. The majority of American Christianity's fascination with divine healing played a significant role in the popularity and inter-denominational nature of the revival movement.

Oral Roberts and William Branham are described by historian David Edwin Harrell as the two giants of the movement. William Branham, who died in a 1965 car accident, is widely regarded as the initiator and the pacesetter of the revival, and described by Harrell as the movement's "unlikely leader." Roberts emerged as the most popular figure and left the most lasting legacy, including the university bearing his name. Referring to Branham's first series of meetings in St Louis in June 1946, Krapohl & Lippy have commented: "Historians generally mark this turn in Branham’s ministry as inaugurating the modern healing revival".

Branham was the source of inspiration for T. L. Osborn's worldwide crusade ministry and dozens of other smaller ministries involved in the healing revival. Other major figures of the revival were Jack Coe and later A. A. Allen. Many of these ministries shared their healing testimonies in The Voice of Healing, a periodical published by Gordon Lindsay, which created cohesion for the group in its nascent years.

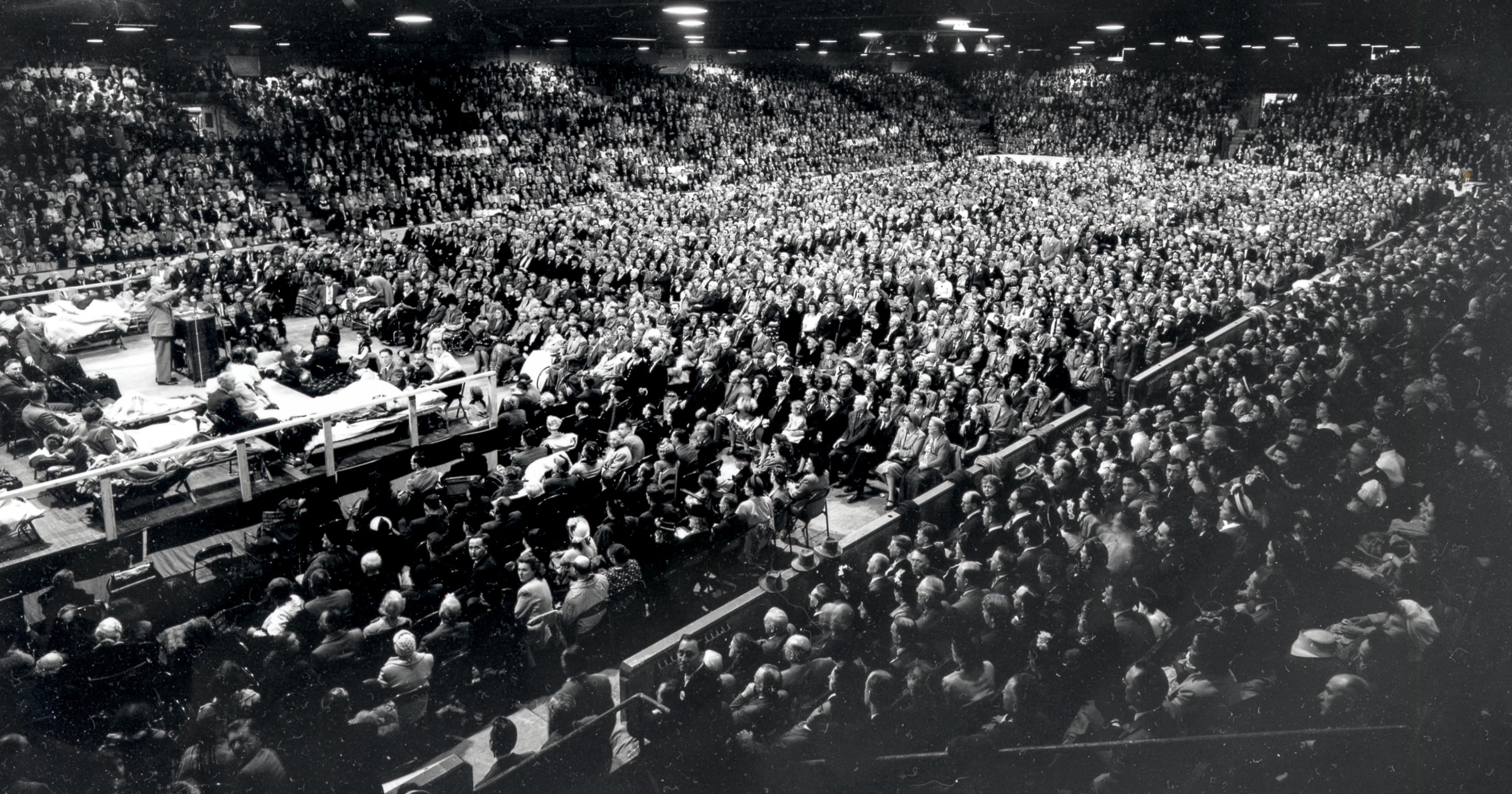
Branham Campaign meeting in Tacoma, Washington, April 1948

The Healing Revival was closely connected to the Latter Rain movement, and the two movements deeply influenced each other. In 1948, attendees at a William Branham healing campaign in western Canada were inspired by the sermon and events of the meetings to begin fasting and praying to experience similar things in their church. The fruits of their efforts started the Latter Rain movement which quickly spread internationally and attracted many of the same people participating in the Healing Revival. Joseph Mattsson-Boze was a prominent leader of the Latter Rain movement, and his magazine Herald of Faith provided publicity to both the Healing Revival and the Latter Rain movement.

== 1956 peak ==
By the mid-1950s, dozens of ministers associated with Branham and his campaigns had launched similar healing campaigns. In 1956, the healing revival reached its peak, as 49 separate evangelists held major meetings.

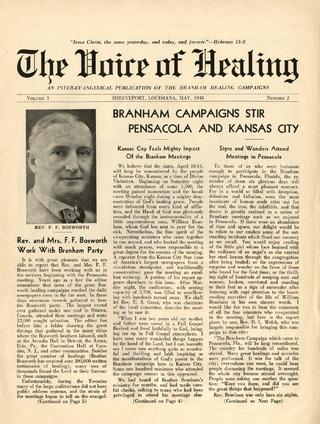
April 1948 cover of Voice of Healing magazine

By 1960, the number of evangelists holding national campaigns dropped to 11. Several perspectives on the decline of the healing revival have been offered. Crowder suggested Branham's gradual separation from Gordon Lindsay played a major part in the decline. Harrell attributed the decline to the increasing number of evangelists crowding the field and straining the financial resources of the Pentecostal denominations. Weaver agreed Pentecostal churches gradually withdrew their support for the healing revival, mainly over the financial stresses put on local churches by the healing campaigns. The Assemblies of God were the first to openly withdraw support from the healing revival in 1953. Weaver pointed to other factors that may have helped destroy the initial ecumenism of the revival; tension between the independent evangelists and the Pentecostal churches caused by the evangelists' fund-raising methods, denominational pride, sensationalism, and doctrinal conflicts—particularly between the Oneness and Trinitarian factions within Pentecostalism. Weaver also believed that "fraud and chicanary" by the revivals evangelists also played a major role in the decline.

== Results ==
A result of these major healing ministries of the post-War era was a renewed belief and emphasis in divine healing among many Christians, and this was a part of the broader Charismatic Movement, a movement which today numbers about 308 million worldwide.

== Sources ==
- Crowder, J. (2006). Miracle Workers, Reformers, and The New Mystics. Destiny Image. ISBN 978-0-7684-2350-1.
- Harrell, David (1978). All Things Are Possible: The Healing and Charismatic Revivals in Modern America. Indiana University Press. ISBN 0-525-24136-1.
- Hanegraaff, Hank (2001). Counterfeit Revival. Thomas Nelson Publishers. ISBN 0-8499-4294-2.
- Weaver, C. Douglas (2000). The Healer-Prophet: William Marrion Branham (A study of the Prophetic in American Pentecostalism). Mercer University Press. ISBN 978-0-865-54710-0.
