= Joseph Mattsson-Boze =

Pentecostal minister

Joseph D. Mattsson-Boze (February 7, 1905 – January 22, 1989) was a Swedish-American minister and pastor of Chicago's Philadelphia Church from 1933 to 1958, with the exception of 1939–1941 when he pastored the Rock Church in New York. He was publisher and editor of the Herald of Faith magazine, which had wide circulation among Pentecostals in the United States.

== Biography ==
Boze was a native of Sweden born in Marstrand. He got saved in 1922 at a meeting in Göteborg. In 1926, he became member of Smyrna Church in Göteborg who was a part of the Swedish Pentecostal Movement. He later became pastor in the pentecostal church in Uddevalla 1929-1931. Later he returned to Göteborg where he became assistant pastor under pastor Ivar Claesson. In 1933 he immigrated to the United States to become pastor of the Swedish Pentecostal church Filadelfia församlingen (later the Philadelphia Church) in Chicago. The church was part of the Independent Assemblies of God (IAOG) a loose organization of Scandinavian Pentecostal churches in USA. Joseph Mattsson made a visit to Sweden 1935 to marry Daga Adolphina Erlandson from Grava on August 13. The couple had five children. During that trip he also met with Lewi Pethrus the leader of the Swedish Pentecostal movement. In 1941 he received American citizenship and added Boze to his namne. He returned to Sweden again to preach in 1945.

Mattsson-Boze became involved in the Latter Rain movement 1948 after visiting a meeting in Edmonton, Canada during October. Together with his assistant pastor Andrew W. Rasmussen the church in Chicago became deeply involved in the Latter Rain revival. He worked closely with William Branham during the Healing Revival of the mid-20th century, and served as his main source of publicity during the 1960s.

In the 1950s, he was instrumental in working to launch and popularize the ministry of Jim Jones. He served as chairman of multiple Christian Fellowship conventions organized and led by Jones. Jones became increasingly influential in the movement as a result of his support.

After 1958, he began working in Christian missions in Africa until his retirement in 1974. Through his mission work, he successfully organized dozens of Pentecostal churches in Africa. He died in January 1989.

== Sources ==
References Malmström, Nils; "Han arbetar efter amerikanska metoder- Joseph Mattsson-Boze ett liv i skärningspunkten mellan amerikansk och svensk pingströrelse" in Alvarsson(ed) Varför reste Lewi Pethrus just till Chicago? - relationerna mellan Sverige och USA inom ramen för pentekostalismen, Studia Pentecostalia Upsaliensis NR 4, Artos 2019.

Mattson-Boze, Joseph, Kunna vi vänta en världsvid väckelse, Stockholm 1947. Mattsson-Boze, Joseph, Tro som förflyttar berg, Stockholm 1950 Mattsson-Boze, Joseph, Livet är härligt, Stockholm 1951. Mattsson-Boze, Joseph, Frigörelse och framtid, Stockholm 1958. Mattsson-Boze, Joseph, Gyllene tempel och gyllene tillfällen, Stockholm 1960 Mattsson-Boze, Joseph, Äventur på Trons väg; Marstrandspojken berättar, Stockholm 1978.
