= Gospel Assembly Churches =

US non-denominational Christian churches

Gospel Assembly churches
- Classification: Non-Denominational
- Orientation: Pentecostal
- Polity: Congregational
- Distinct fellowships: Gospel Kingdom church in Louisville, Ky
- Associations: Names of churches may include Gospel Assembly, Gospel Kingdom, Body of Christ
- Region: Worldwide
- Headquarters: USA
- Founder: William Sowders
- Origin: 1914; Paducah, Kentucky
- Congregations: 10s of thousands
- Missionaries: Haiti, Dominican Republic, India, Kenya, Burundi

Gospel Assembly Churches are non-denominational Christian Churches based in the United States. The churches were founded in 1914 by minister William Sowders (1879–1952).

== Origins ==
The beginnings of Gospel Assemblies may be traced to Paducah, Kentucky in 1914 during the early American Pentecostal movement. Sowders, a former Louisville policeman, evangelized primarily in the lower Ohio River valley region, settling in Louisville, where he established a congregation and ministered there until his death in 1952. Sowders' designated successor, T. M. Jolly, ministered in St. Louis until 1991.

== Doctrine ==
Like other evangelical denominations, Gospel Assembly churches believe the Bible to be the pure Word of God. Members utilize the term 'the Body of Christ' to refer to their fellowship exclusively, and 'Babylon' to refer to the remainder of the church world. They consider their movement to represent a restoration of the early church.

No formal doctrinal statement is published because they consider themselves to be continually growing in the grace and knowledge of the Lord. However, they are distinctly nontrinitarian, neither are they oneness like other Christians within the Pentecostal tradition. They commit to the God Head doctrine of Arianism. Like most churches, primary worship services are traditionally held on Sundays, however, most often they are in the early afternoon, in a departure from standard practice.

They believe in spiritual communion, meaning that their communion takes place over the fellowship of the Word of God, and also do practice the literal Lord's Supper with the elements. The churches practice literal water baptism as an outward ritual, but also emphasize the spiritual aspects of the ordinances.

== Order and practice ==
Gospel Assemblies is Pentecostal by experience. They ascribe to holiness as the result of a sanctified heart, expressed in standards of speech and demeanor, modest dress, and a lifestyle of humility and moderation. Music is orchestral-based, with many of their published hymns and choruses written by church members. Their worship services are conducted in 'open-order' fashion, somewhat similar to Quaker worship services, encouraging active participation by the congregation in music and in the ministry of the Word, as led by the Spirit of God.

== Constituency ==
Gospel Assembly churches are located in 17 nations, including some in western Europe, southern Africa, Mexico, and the Caribbean region. While centered in the lower Midwest, Gospel Assemblies can be found in 40 U.S. states and four Canadian provinces, with 150,000 to 200,000 members in several thousand congregations internationally. A schism from the group, founded by Lloyd Goodwin and based in Des Moines, Iowa, is almost identical in faith and practice but differs on issues of polity and leadership. That group publishes a quarterly magazine, The Gospel of Peace.

== Facilities ==
In 1935, Sowders established the Gospel of the Kingdom campground at Shepherdsville, Kentucky for camp meetings, which still remains in use. Ministerial meetings for doctrinal discussion are held at the campground which are known as "the threshing floor." The fellowship's largest church, a 3000-seat building in Louisville on Stone Street Road known as “The Convention Center”, is also used for conventions. Another very large congregation is in Houston. www.gahouston.org.

== Cult accusations and cult-like practices ==
Some former and some current members feel that Gospel Assemblies possesses several characteristics of a sociological cult. Former and current adherents cite spiritual abuse and "heavy shepherding," including control of activities, finances, time, possessions, and relationships. The church has, however, refuted these claims.
