= Clem Davies (minister) =

Canadian Christian minister and KKK recruiter

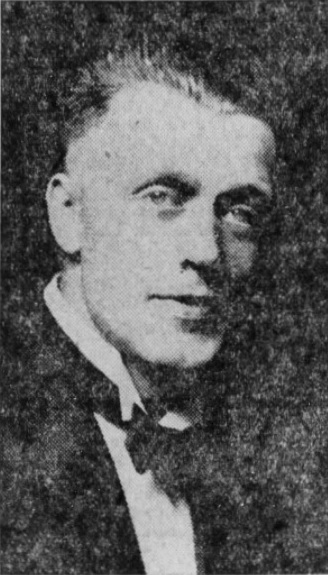
- Clem Davies, 1923
- Born: December 3, 1889; Birmingham, England
- Died: December 21, 1951 (aged 62)

Clement Llewellyn Davies (1889 – 1951) was a Canadian British-Israel preacher. Davies was a dominant personality and a skilled marketer who drew large crowds to his preaching. He was pastor of Centennial Methodist Church, followed by Victoria City Temple and "Dr. Clem Davies' Ministry, Inc." in Victoria, British Columbia. Davies was an early adopter of radio in British Columbia, operating an unlicensed amateur station for his ministry, and combined this with his other marketing to draw crowds to his preaching. He later moved his ministry operations to Los Angeles where he was associated with Gerald L. K. Smith. During the 1940s, he traveled the country along with Avak Hagopian, a faith healer, drawing large crowds.

== Early life ==
Clem Davies was born in 1889 in Birmingham, England to Welsh parents. His father and grandfather had been part-time Wesleyan ministers. Deciding to become a minister, he began his education in Birmingham. He emigrated to North America around 1909. He became the interim minister of Centennial Methodist Church in Victoria, British Columbia in 1922.

== Early ministry ==
Davies was Victoria's first radio priest, launching a radio ministry at Centennial Methodist by Easter Sunday of 1923. Using the letters CFCL (Centennial First, Centennial Last), this was the second radio station in Victoria and may have been the first in Canada owned by a church. During the 1920s, most Canadian broadcasters were private and Davies was no exception, operating as an amateur without a license.

== Victoria City Temple ==
In May 1924, the Methodist conference voted to not retain Davies at Centennial, and another minister was retained at the church. 20 of the 30 church board members resigned and 300 members voted to start a new church led by Davies. He moved his ministry along with his radio station to Victoria City Temple in 1924. When he moved from Centennial Methodist to Victoria City Temple, he moved his radio transmitter to downtown Victoria and changed his position on the dial. The new call letters were CFCT (Call Friends of City Temple).

As pastor of Victoria City Temple, Davies was a controversial but popular figure. During the first year of the Temple's operation, the average attendance for Sunday night was 1400. During the early 1920s, conflict was growing between Asian and White communities in British Columbia. In 1924, Davies gave a sermon titled British or Oriential Columbia - Which?. Davies also took to the radio to warn the that Ku Klux Klan was growing in the area and would be willing to take matters "into its own hands" unless there were action from the legislature. Davies popularity attracted 181 delegates from 80 groups to a meeting that would eventually form the Oriental Exclusion League, of which Davies was the first president. During this time, Davies used his pulpit to promote both British Israelism and the Ku Klux Klan.

By 1934, British Israelism had become the dominant theme of Davies's sermons. It was also in 1934 that Davies resigned from City Temple, although City Temple continued to promote British Israelism after he left.

== Later ministry ==
After leaving City Temple, Davies's began a new ministry; although this time without a name. It was essentially a cult, with no board of directors, and the meetings were advertised as "Clem Davies". His only connections at this time were to British Israel organizations, which was also the primary theme of his services.

Davies continued to promote British Israelism and continued to fill the Empire Theater in Victoria. In 1936, he brought in William Aberhart to speak on economics and prophecy. When Edward VIII abdicated, it created a bit of a problem for Davies, who had been preaching and predicting that Edward would be England's final king as he relinquished his crown at the Second Coming of Christ. Davies began to explain this event occurring as a result of an international Jewish conspiracy. He published his thoughts in Edward's Abdication and the House of Rothschild, a book in which Davies blamed the Jews as being behind all of history's great disasters, including the French Revolution, the Napoleonic Wars, World War I, and the Great Depression. These conspiracy theories later expanded to include plots by the Jesuits.

In May 1937, Davies attended the first convention of the Anglo-Saxon Association of North America was held in Greater Vancouver. It was made up of the western segment of Howard Rand's Anglo-Saxon Federation of America and the British-Israel Association of Greater Vancouver.

Davies finally registered his ministry in 1938 as "Dr. Clem Davies' Ministry, Inc." with plans to build an auditorium with the ability to house audiences of up to 12,000. However, in 1940 received an invitation to join the faculty of Kingdom Temple Bible Institute in Los Angeles and join the Kingdom Temple as one of the ministers there.

Davies was a speaker at the Anglo-Saxon Federation meeting in March 1940 that was organized by Gordon Lindsay in Vancouver, British Columbia.

By the 1940s, Davies had shifted his activities to Los Angeles along with Joe Jeffers, Jonathan Perkins, John Lovell, Conrad Gaard, Bertrand Comparet, William Potter Gale, and Wesley Swift, all of whom settled into an orbit around Gerald L. K. Smith. It was through the antisemitic version of British Israelism taught by these West Coast ministers that Christian Identity would eventually emerge. Davies played an active role in Gerald L. K. Smith's Christian Nationalist Crusade.

Davies began traveling and ministering in the United States and Canada throughout the 1940s through the sponsorship of Tom Kardashian and William Perumean. During 1947, Kardashian sponsored joint events featuring both Davis and Avak Hagopian, an Armenian faith healer with the same sponsors. The pair traveled the United States holding joint appearances.

In 1948, Davies hosted screenings of D. W. Griffith's The Birth of a Nation at Shrine Auditorium in Los Angeles.

== Works ==
- Edward's Abdication and the House of Rothschild, Victoria: Diggon-Hibben Ltd, 1936.
- Lemurians on Mt. Shasta, Los Angeles: Dr. Clem Davies' Ministry, Inc, 1944.
- The Racial Strains of Mankind, Los Angeles: Dr. Clem Davies' Ministry, Inc, 1946.
- What is Anglo-Israel?
- Pre-Adamic Races
