= James Gordon Lindsay =

American revivalist preacher (1906–1973)

Gordon Lindsay
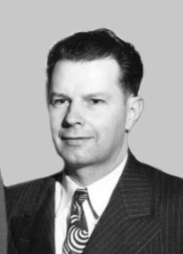
- James Gordon Lindsay
- Born: June 18, 1906; Zion, Illinois
- Died: April 1, 1973 (aged 66); Dallas, Texas
- Occupations: Pentecostal evangelist, writer, pastor

James Gordon Lindsay (June 18, 1906 – April 1, 1973) was a revivalist preacher, author, and founder of Christ for the Nations Institute in Dallas.

Born in Zion, Illinois, Lindsay's parents were disciples of John Alexander Dowie, the father of healing revivalism in America. After the family moved to Portland, Oregon, the young boy was influenced by John G. Lake and converted to Pentecostalism by Charles Fox Parham. At the age of eighteen he began his ministry as a traveling evangelist, conducting meetings in Assembly of God, British Israelite churches and other Pentecostal groups. By 1940 he was organizing large convention meetings, including the 1940 Anglo-Saxon World Federation meetings in Vancouver.

In 1947 he began serving as campaign manager and publicist for William Branham, with whom he established Voice of Healing magazine in 1948. Lindsay gradually took over full management of the Voice of Healing association which helped launch and popularize the ministries of Oral Roberts, A. A. Allen, and dozens of other prominent evangelists. In 1971, Lindsay renamed the organization Christ For The Nations to reflect the growing missionary focus of the organization. He led the organization until his death.

== Biography ==
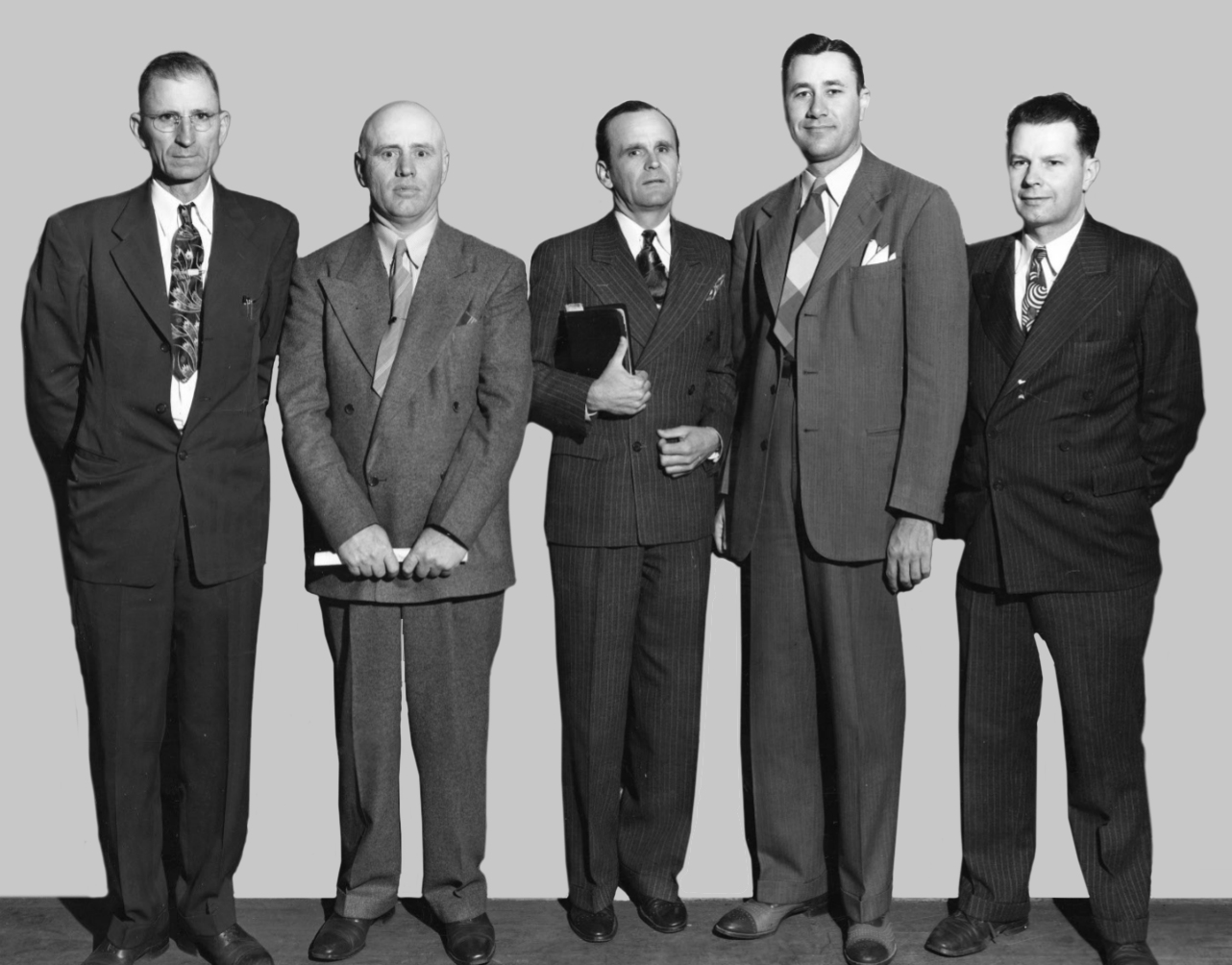
From left: Young Brown, Jack Moore, William Branham, Oral Roberts, Gordon Lindsay; photo taken at Kansas City in 1948

James Gordon Lindsay was born and raised in an atmosphere of healing and Pentecostal experience. He was born in Zion City, Illinois, on June 18, 1906. His parents were Thomas Lindsay and Effie (Ramsey) Lindsay. They were followers of John Alexander Dowie, a famous healing evangelist of the late 1800s who claimed to be the return of Elijah the Prophet and founded Zion as a religious commune. When the city went bankrupt, after the fall of Dowie, the Lindsay family moved to a Christian community led by Pisgah Finis E. Yoakum in California, and then to Portland, Oregon. Lindsay converted to Pentecostalism during a meeting led by Charles Fox Parham, an early leader of the Pentecostal movement in Topeka, Kansas. He then developed a relationship with John G. Lake, who had also been a follower of Dowie, and who was leading the Divine Healing Mission in Spokane, Washington and Portland, Oregon. During the 1920s, Lindsay traveled with Lake in mission campaigns in California and the southern states. Then he became a pastor of a Foursquare Gospel church in California before returning later to Oregon, where he married Freda Schimpf.

Lindsay was involved with the British Israelite movement and was the organizer of the 1940 Anglo Saxon World Federation Convention held during March in Vancouver, Canada. Speakers at the event included Canadian minister Clem Davies, a KKK sympathizer and promoter of British Israelism. When World War II broke out, Lindsay accepted a call to become pastor of a church in Ashland, Oregon in early 1940.

== Voice of Healing ==
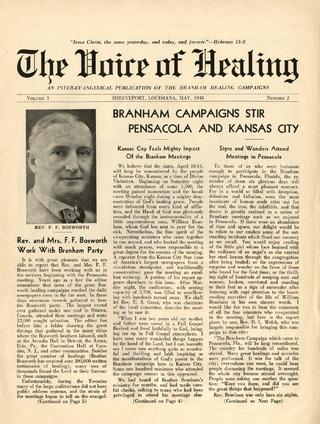
April 1948 cover of Voice of Healing magazine

Lindsay first heard William Branham in a meeting in Sacramento during the authum of 1947 and, after meeting with him, they both agreed that Lindsay should act as Branham's campaign manager. Later that year he resigned his pastoral position to become campaign manager for Branham. In order to promote the campaign, Lindsay started the "Voice of Healing" in Shreveport, Louisiana in April 1948. Shreveport was home of Branham's prior campaign manager Jack Moore, who pastored a church in the city. A magazine of wide circulation, particularly in the southern US, the first issue listed William Branham as publisher, Gordon Lindsay as editor, Jack Moore as associate editor, and Anna Jeanne Moore as circulation editor.

A few months later in July 1948, Branham announced he was stepping away from the revival circuit for a time. The news came as quite a blow to Lindsay who had just begun the revival publication to cover Branham's meetings. Coverage of other evangelists, such as Jack Coe, Oral Roberts, and A. A. Allen began to appear in the magazine as it circulated nationwide. The group sponsored the first convention of healing evangelists in Dallas, Texas during 1949 and began to function as a loose fellowship of ministers under the Voice of Healing banner. In 1950 a biography of Branham written by Lindsay ("William Branham: A Man Sent from God") was published.

By October 1950, Branham was no longer the publisher but was listed as an associate editor. The masthead listed the following editors:

- Gordon Lindsay - Editor
- Jack Moore - Co-editor
- Anna Jeanne Moore - Managing editor
- F. F. Bosworth - Associate editor
- Wilbur Ogilvie - Associate editor
- William Branham - Associate editor
- O.L. Jaggers - Associate editor
- Harvey McAlister - Associate editor
- T. L. Osborn - Associate editor
- Dale Hanson - Associate editor
- Gayle Jackson - Associate editor

As the popularity of some of its members rose, they left the fellowship to establish their own organizations and publish their own literature. As a result of the popularity of the magazine, and Lindsay's status as a key organizer of revival meetings, Lindsay played a key role in the Healing Revival period.

== Sources ==
- Harrell, David (1978). All Things Are Possible: The Healing and Charismatic Revivals in Modern America. Indiana University Press. ISBN 0-525-24136-1.
