= Spiritual communion =

Christian practice related to Holy Communion

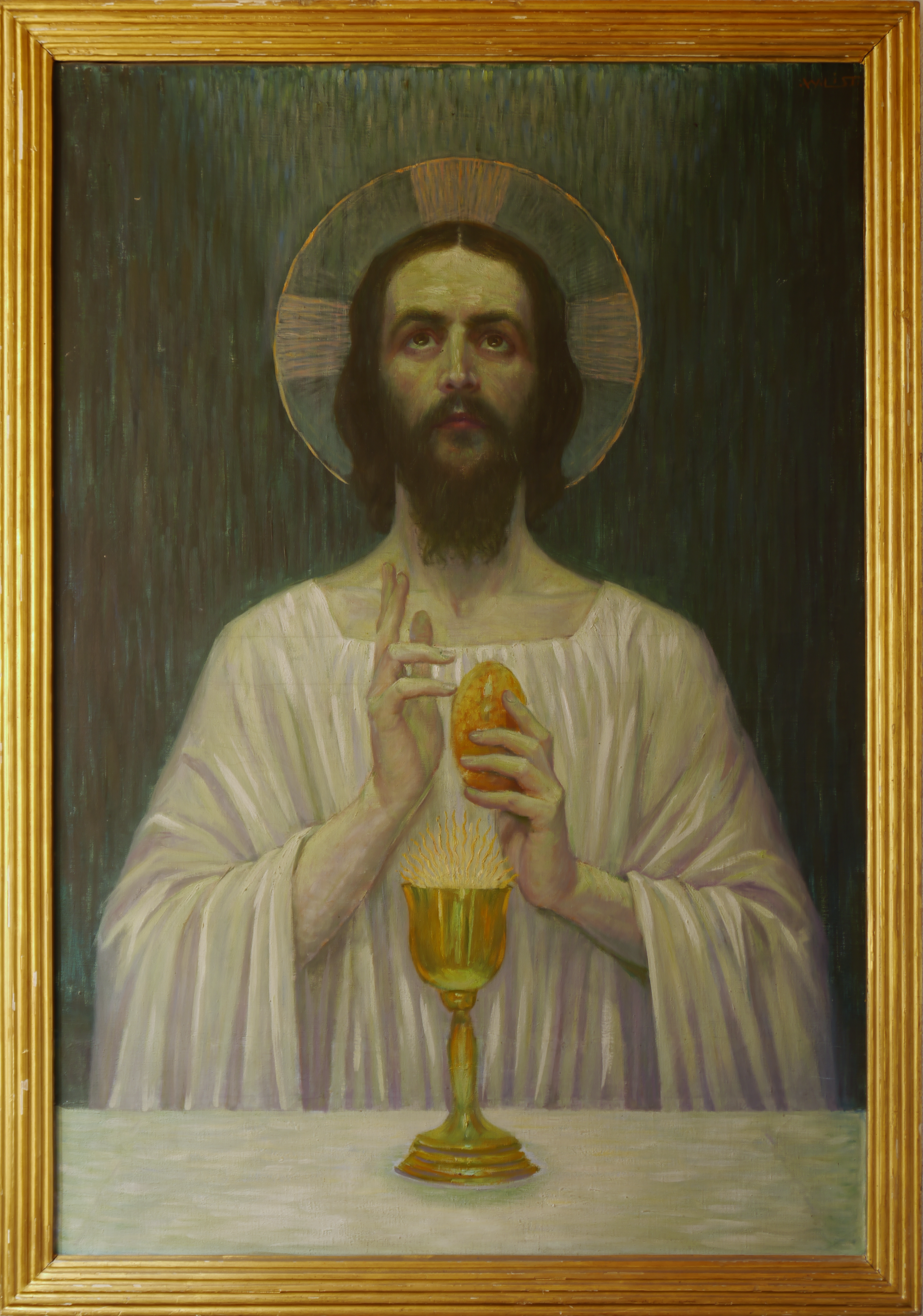
Jesus with Bread and Wine by Wilhelm List (c. 1905)

Spiritual communion is a Christian practice of desiring union with Jesus Christ in the Eucharist. It is used as a preparation for Mass and by individuals who cannot receive Holy Communion.

This practice is well established in Lutheran, Anglican, and Methodist churches, as well as in the Catholic Church, where it has been highly recommended by many saints, according to Pope John Paul II. He explained that practicing this constant desire for Jesus in the Eucharist is rooted in the ultimate perfection of eucharistic communion, which is the ultimate goal of every human desire.

The practice of spiritual communion has been especially used by Christians in times of persecution, such as during the era of state atheism in the Eastern Bloc, as well as in times of plague, such as during the recent COVID-19 pandemic, when many Christians were unable to attend Mass, and could not receive the Eucharist on the Lord's Day.

== Doctrine ==
Thomas Aquinas defined spiritual communion as "an ardent desire to receive Jesus in the Holy Sacrament and a loving embrace as though we had already received Him." The basis of this practice was explained by Pope John Paul II in his encyclical, Ecclesia de Eucharistia:

In the Eucharist, "unlike any other sacrament, the mystery [of communion] is so perfect that it brings us to the heights of every good thing: Here is the ultimate goal of every human desire, because here we attain God and God joins himself to us in the most perfect union." Precisely for this reason it is good to cultivate in our hearts a constant desire for the sacrament of the Eucharist. This was the origin of the practice of "spiritual communion", which has happily been established in the Church for centuries and recommended by saints who were masters of the spiritual life. Saint Teresa of Jesus wrote: "When you do not receive communion and you do not attend Mass, you can make a spiritual communion, which is a most beneficial practice; by it the love of God will be greatly impressed on you" [emphasis in the original].

Thus, the passionate desire for God, whom the saints have seen as the Sole Satisfier, and who in the Eucharist is the "summit and source of the Christian life", is at the root of this practice. The experience of Padre Pio illustrates the compelling desire felt by the saints in the face of the drawing and attracting power of God's love:

My heart feels as if it were being drawn by a superior force each morning just before uniting with Him in the Blessed Sacrament. I have such a thirst and hunger before receiving Him that it's a wonder I don't die of anxiety. I was hardly able to reach the Divine Prisoner in order to celebrate Mass. When Mass ended I remained with Jesus to render Him thanks. My thirst and hunger do not diminish after I have received Him in the Blessed Sacrament, but rather, increase steadily. Oh, how sweet was the conversation I held with Paradise this morning. The heart of Jesus and my own, if you will pardon the expression, fused. They were no longer two hearts beating but only one. My heart disappeared as if it were a drop in the ocean.

Jean-Marie Vianney compared spiritual communion to blowing on fire and embers that are starting to go out in order to make them burn again:

There are some who make a spiritual communion every day with blessed bread. If we are deprived of Sacramental Communion, let us replace it, as far as we can, by spiritual communion, which we can make every moment; for we ought to have always a burning desire to receive the good God. Communion is to the soul like blowing a fire that is beginning to go out, but that has still plenty of hot embers; we blow, and the fire burns again. After the reception of the Sacraments, when we feel ourselves slacken in the love of God, let us have recourse at once to spiritual communion. When we cannot go to the church, let us turn towards the tabernacle; no wall can shut us out from the good God.

Josemaría Escrivá taught spiritual communions improve presence of God: "What a source of grace there is in spiritual Communion! Practise it frequently and you'll have more presence of God and closer union with him in your life." He also taught: "Do not neglect to say, 'Jesus, I love you', and make one spiritual communion, at least, each day, in atonement for all the profanations and sacrileges he suffers because he wants to be with us."

According to Catholic theologians, the value of a spiritual communion can be as great as Holy Communion itself. Stefano Manelli wrote:

Spiritual Communion, as St. Thomas Aquinas and St. Alphonsus Liguori teach, produces effects similar to Sacramental Communion, according to the dispositions with which it is made, the greater or less earnestness with which Jesus is desired, and the greater or less love with which Jesus is welcomed and given due attention.

A special advantage of Spiritual Communion is that we can make it as often as we like – even hundreds of times a day – when we like – even late at night – and wherever we like – even in a desert, or up in an airplane.

The Church of England, mother church of the Anglican Communion, teaches with regard to spiritual communion that "Believers who cannot physically receive the sacrament are to be assured that they are partakers by faith of the Body and Blood of Christ and of the benefits he conveys to us by them."

The Methodist Church in Great Britain teaches that "Spiritual Communion is a practice where we entrust ourselves to God in prayer, pledging ourselves to God once more as disciples and praying that God might give us spiritually the same grace we share when we physically receive Holy Communion." The practice is consistent with Methodist theology, which holds that God can impart grace "with or without physical means: God can work through anything or indeed nothing."

== Examples ==
According to the official Catholic handbook (enchiridion) for indulgences, "an Act of Spiritual Communion, according to any pious formula, is enriched with a partial indulgence."

It also specifically mentions this Act of Spiritual Communion, which was recommended by Alphonsus Liguori:

My Jesus, I believe that Thou art present in the Blessed Sacrament. I love Thee above all things and I desire Thee in my soul. Since I cannot now receive Thee sacramentally, come at least spiritually into my heart. As though Thou wert already there, I embrace Thee and unite myself wholly to Thee; permit not that I should ever be separated from Thee. Amen.

Cardinal Rafael Merry del Val composed this spiritual communion:

At Thy feet, O my Jesus, I prostrate myself and I offer Thee repentance of my contrite heart, which is humbled in its nothingness and in Thy holy presence. I adore Thee in the Sacrament of Thy love, the ineffable Eucharist. I desire to receive Thee into the poor dwelling that my heart offers Thee. While waiting for the happiness of sacramental communion, I wish to possess Thee in spirit. Come to me, O my Jesus, since I, for my part, am coming to Thee! May Thy love embrace my whole being in life and in death. I believe in Thee, I hope in Thee, I love Thee. Amen.

— https://www.vaticannews.va/en/prayers/the-spiritual-communion.html

Another example is:

As I cannot this day enjoy the happiness of assisting at the holy Mysteries, O my God! I transport myself in spirit at the foot of Thine altar; I unite with the Church, which by the hands of the priest, offers Thee Thine adorable Son in the Holy Sacrifice; I offer myself with Him, by Him, and in His Name. I adore, I praise, and thank Thee, imploring Thy mercy, invoking Thine assistance, and presenting Thee the homage I owe Thee as my Creator, the love due to Thee as my Savior. Apply to my soul, I beseech Thee, O merciful Jesus, Thine infinite merits; apply them also to those for whom I particularly wish to pray. I desire to communicate spiritually, that Thy Blood may purify, Thy Flesh strengthen, and Thy Spirit sanctify me. May I never forget that Thou, my divine Redeemer, hast died for me; may I die to all that is not Thee, that hereafter I may live eternally with Thee. Amen.

Piarist fathers have taught this short act of spiritual communion, popularized by Josemaría Escrivá:

I wish, Lord, to receive you with the purity, humility and devotion with which your most holy Mother received you, with the spirit and fervour of the saints.

Prayers taken from the A Form of Spiritual Communion of the Diocese of Malaita of the Anglican Communion are as follows:

In union, O Dear Lord, with the faithful at every Altar of Thy Church, where Thy blessed Body and Blood are being offered to the Father, I desire to offer Thee praise and thanksgiving. I present to Thee my soul and body, with the earnest wish that I may ever be united to Thee. And since I cannot now receive Thee sacramentally, I beseech Thee to come spiritually into my heart. I unite myself to Thee, and embrace Thee with all the affections of my soul. O let nothing ever separate me from Thee. Let me live and die in Thy love. Amen.

Grant, O Lord Jesus Christ, that as the hem of Thy garment, touched in faith, healed the woman who could not touch Thy Body, so the soul of Thy servant may be healed by like faith in Thee, Whom I cannot now sacramentally receive; through Thy tender mercy, Who livest and reignest with the Father in the unity of the Holy Ghost ever one God. Amen.

Mitchell Lewis, a Methodist elder, authored an act of spiritual communion for use in the Methodist tradition:

My Jesus, I love you above all things. How I long to receive you with my brothers and sisters at the table you have prepared. Since I cannot at this moment receive you in bread and wine according to your promise in the sacrament of Holy Communion, I ask you to feed me with the manna of your Holy Spirit and nourish me with your Holy presence. I unite myself wholly to you. Never permit me to be separated from your love. Amen.

St. Stephen Evangelical Lutheran Church, a congregation of the Evangelical Lutheran Church in America in Pompano Beach, published the following act of spiritual communion:

Lord Jesus, we desire earnestly to experience your love as guests at the heavenly feast you have prepared for your children on earth in the most holy Sacrament of the Altar. As were are not able on this day to be gathered at your Table, may we receive you into our hearts by faith, trusting the word of your promise, that "those who love me will keep my word, and my Father will love them, and we will come to them and make our home with them." Strengthen our faith, increase our love and hope; and after this life grant us a place at your heavenly table, where we shall eat of the eternal manna, and drink of the river of your pleasure forevermore. Hear us for your own Name's sake. Amen.

== Usage ==
The practice of spiritual communion is used by Christians, especially Catholics, Lutherans, Anglicans and Methodists, when they have been unable to receive the Holy Communion, especially in times of sickness and during persecution by states hostile towards religion. Anglican priest Jonathan Warren Pagán cited the joy Walter Ciszek experienced by making spiritual communion during the era of state atheism in the Soviet Union that resulted in the persecution of Christians in the Eastern Bloc.

Referencing theology related to the Body of Christ and the real presence of Christ in the Eucharist, Anglican priest Jonathan Warren Pagán wrote that "Gathered worship in word and sacrament is therefore not an optional add-on for Christians" though the COVID-19 pandemic rendered it necessary to move to online formats for the common good. He encouraged the practice of spiritual communion amidst the pandemic, especially during the Anglican service of morning prayer. Pope Francis also suggested that the faithful say spiritual communion prayers during the COVID-19 pandemic, which renewed interest in the practice; Methodist clergy have also encouraged spiritual communion.

== See also ==
- Sacrament of Penance
