= Christ for the Nations Institute =

Charismatic Christian Bible college in Texas, US

Coordinates: 32.700647°N 96.830718°W

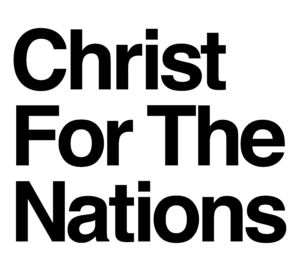
- Type: Christian Bible College Undergraduate Institution
- Established: 1970
- Founder: Gordon Lindsay
- Accreditation: Unaccredited
- President: Golan Lindsay
- Location: Dallas, Texas, United States
- Campus: Urban
- Website: www.CFNI.org

Christ for the Nations Institute (CFNI) is an interdenominational charismatic Bible college based in Dallas that serves as the educational cornerstone of Christ for the Nations, Inc. It was established in July 1970 by Gordon and Freda Lindsay.

== History ==
American evangelist James Gordon Lindsay and his wife, Freda Lindsay, founded Christ for the Nations Institute (CFNI) in 1970. After Gordon died in 1973, Freda and her family continued operating the institution. The organization has trained more than 33,000 students, reached 120 nations, and assisted native congregations in building more than 12,500 churches all over the world.

== Accreditation and affiliation ==
CFNI is accredited by the International Christian Accrediting Association, a private Christian organization operated under the auspices of Oral Roberts University.

CFNI is a member of the Association of Christian Schools International, is approved by the United States Department of Homeland Security to enroll international students, and has approval from the Department of Veterans Affairs for veteran training.

Christ for the Nations Institute is not state-accredited. Until April 21, 2007, it had "applicant status" with the Association for Biblical Higher Education. Applicant status is a pre-membership status granted to colleges that may be able to achieve pre-accreditation candidate status within four years. On April 21, 2007, the CFNI board of directors withdrew from pursuing ABHE accreditation. But CFNI holds articulation agreements, for the purpose of transferring credits, with many accredited Christian universities and Bible colleges. The receiving school always determines credit transferability. These institutions include: Dallas Baptist University, The King's University, Oral Roberts University, Grand Canyon University, and Messenger College.

== Athletics ==
Christ for the Nations Institute has a number of intramural sports teams, including flag football, basketball, volleyball, and soccer.

== CFNI Association of Bible Schools (CFNABS) ==
Below is a list of over 50 schools in 47 nations within the association:

Africa

- Botswana: Love Botswana Bible Institute
- Cameroon
  - Cameroon Bible College
  - Fire Bible Institute
  - Christ For Africa University
- Congo/Burundi
  - Missions Training Center – CFNI
- Ethiopia: Christ for the Nations Ethiopia
- Ghana: Christian Faith Training Center
- Ivory Coast
  - Institut International de Formation Pastoral et Théologique
  - Ivory Coast Burning Bush Biblical Institute
- Kenya
  - Biblical Life Bible College
  - Glory Bible School
  - Lari Hills Theological School
  - Nurmay Missionary Training and Empowerment Center
- Liberia
  - Christ for the Nations Bible School
  - Christ Our Savior Bible School
  - Promised Land Equipping Center
- Malawi: Grace Bible Institute
- Mauritius: Word 2 Change
- Mozambique
  - Inhaminga Afrika wa Yesu Bible School
  - Nacala Afrika wa Yesu Bible School
- Nigeria
  - Christ for the Nations Jos
  - Apostle Geoffrey Dabibi Numbere Bible College
  - Reuben George Theological Seminary
- Senegal: Word Alive Bible Training Center
- South Africa
  - Durban Christian Centre Bible School
  - Light For Africa Bible School
  - New Covenant Church Bryanston Bible School
  - Revealed Word Bible College
  - Word of Faith Bible Institute
- Zimbabwe
  - Celebration College
  - Faith World Bible College – Harare
  - Goshen International Bible College – Harare
  - Hope Bible College – Harare

Asia

- India
  - Bible Training Institute – Allahabad
  - Carmel Bible College – Eluru
  - Christ for the Nations Bible College – Nagaland
  - Christ for the Nations Punjab
  - Doulos Bible Institute – Shillong
  - Good News For Asia Bible College – Kerala
  - Maranatha Theological Seminary
  - Maranatha Biblical Seminary – Vijayawada
  - Maranatha Veda Patasala – Visakhapatnam
- Middle East: Christ International Embassy Bible Institute
- Nepal: Kathmandu International University
- Japan: Christ for the Nations Japan (Sapporo)
- Myanmar
  - Myanmar Bible Seminary
  - Shiloh Bible College
- Pakistan: Kingdom Bible College
- South Korea: Christ for the Nations Korea (Seoul)
- Sri Lanka
  - Harvest Leadership Institute
  - Lanka Bible College and Seminary
  - LBC Graduate School
- Thailand: Next Institute of Ministry

Caribbean and North America

- Christ for the Nations Haiti (Port-au-Prince)
- Jamaica: Emmanuel Caribbean University (Montego Bay)
- Mexico
  - Cristo Para Las Naciones (Ecatepec)
  - Cristo Para Las Naciones de Mexico (Mexico City)
  - Cristo Para Las Naciones (Monterrey)
  - Cristo Para Las Naciones (Querétaro)
  - Estandarte Para Las Naciones (Puebla)
  - Christ for the Nations Coyoacon-Naucalpan-Cuajimalpa
  - Christ for the Nations Oaxaca-Tamazulapan
  - Christ for the Nations (Nezahualcoytl)
  - Christ for the Nations (Texcoco)
  - International Harvesters Institute (Nuevo Laredo)
  - Universidad Palabra De Vida (Jalisco)

Central America

- Belize: Christ for the Nations Belize
- Costa Rica: CFNI, Costa Rica
- El Salvador: CFNI, El Salvador, Centro America
- Guatemala: CFNI, Guatemala
- Honduras
  - CFNI, San Pedro Sula
  - CFNI, Tegucigalpa
- Nicaragua: CFNI, Nicaragua

Europe

- Albania: Christ for the Nations Albania
- Belarus: Christ for the Nations
- Denmark: Christ For Denmark
- Germany: Christ for the Nations Glaubenszentrum
- Netherlands: Christ for the Nations
- Poland: Christ for the Nations Poland
- Romania
  - Christ for Romania Cluj (Şcoala Biblică "Cristos pentru România")
  - Christ for Romania Suceava
  - Christ for Romania Timișoara

Oceania

- Australia: Christ for the Nations Australia

South America

- Brazil
  - Instituto Cristo Para as Nações Brazil
  - Instituto Cristo Para as Nações Fortaueza
  - Instituto Cristo Para as Nações Rio de Janeiro
  - Instituto Cristo Para as Nações Manaus
  - School of Leaders for the International Restoration Ministry
- Colombia: Cristo Para Las Naciones Colombia
- Ecuador
  - Escuela de Reyes CFNI
  - Instituto Cristo para las Naciones Ecuador
- Peru: El Centro de Entrenamiento Ministerial y Musical (NISI)

== Youth for the Nations ==
Christ for the Nations Institute hosts an annual youth camp, Youth for the Nations (YFN), for a few weeks during the summer. Since 1990, thousands of young people have attended the event in Dallas, Texas.

== See also ==
- School accreditation
