= Jack Coe =

American pastor

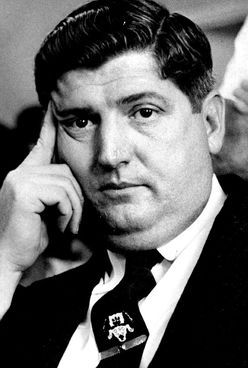
- Coe in 1956
- Born: Jack Coe; March 11, 1918; Oklahoma City, Oklahoma, U.S.
- Died: December 16, 1956 (aged 38); Dallas, Texas, U.S.
- Occupation: Evangelist/faith healer
- Title: Head of Dallas Revival Center
- Spouse: Juanita Geneva Scott Coe
- Children: 1
- Relatives: Descendants of Robert Coe

Jack Coe (March 11, 1918 – December 16, 1956) was an American Pentecostal evangelist, nicknamed "the man of reckless faith". He was one of the first faith healers in the United States with a touring tent ministry after World War II. Coe was ordained in the Assemblies of God in 1944, and began to preach while still serving in World War II. In the following twelve years, he traveled the U.S. organizing tent revivals to spread his message. Coe was frequently the center of controversy, preached extensively through the South, and employed some 80 persons.

== Early life ==
Jack Coe was born in Oklahoma City, Oklahoma, the seventh child of George Henry and Blanche Zoe (Mays) Coe of Pleasantville, Venango County, Pennsylvania, and Oklahoma City. His parents later placed him in an orphanage. He left there in 1935 at the age of 17. A heavy drinker, he joined the Army after World War II began. He later claimed to have experienced a miracle during his time in the military that caused him to become a Christian minister. Coe had close ties with the Assemblies of God, and preached several meetings while he was in the Army. He was ordained in 1944, and began his career as an itinerant preacher.

Through an entirely paternal line, Coe was a direct descendant of English colonist Robert Coe who moved to America from England in 1634.

== Tent evangelist and ministries ==
Coe was dynamic and enthusiastic in his beliefs. He knew Oral Roberts and was impressed by the size of Roberts' revival tent. One day Coe went to a Roberts' tent meeting and measured the tent; he then ordered a larger one. Coe was not bashful about announcing that his tent was the largest in the world; bigger, he claimed, than the one Ringling Bros. and Barnum & Bailey Circus used.

Coe was co-editor of fellow evangelist Gordon Lindsay's Voice of Healing magazine until 1950, when he began his own magazine, the Herald of Healing. By 1956 its circulation was approximately 250,000. Coe also opened a children's orphanage and built a large church building known as the Dallas Revival Center.

== Conflict with denomination and controversy ==
Coe's revival messages centered upon healing, and he was adamant about not taking medicines and not visiting doctors. In 1953, the Assemblies of God expelled him on the grounds that he was "misleading the public" and "antagonizing Dallas Civil Authorities". He was also accused of having an extravagant lifestyle and home. Upon hearing that, Coe printed pictures of four large homes owned by some top officials in the Assemblies of God and the smaller homes of himself and three other revivalists. Coe also charged that the Assemblies of God were "fighting divine healing". Other revivalists soon came into conflict with Pentecostal denominations as well.

== Coe's arrest and case dismissed ==
Coe taught and preached fervently on divine healing, claiming to have healed visitors to his revivals. In a 1955 revival service in Miami, Florida, Coe told the parents of a three-year-old boy that he had healed their son of polio. Coe then told the parents to remove the boy's leg braces. However, the boy was not cured, and removing the braces left him in constant pain. As a result, Coe was arrested on February 6, 1956, and was charged with practicing medicine without a license, a felony in the state of Florida. A judge dismissed the case on grounds that Florida exempts divine healing from the law.

== Death ==
In November, a few months after the charges were dismissed, Coe became sick while in Hot Springs, Arkansas. He returned to Texas and underwent a tracheotomy to help his breathing after his muscles became paralyzed. He was diagnosed with bulbar polio, and died a few weeks later at Dallas' Parkland Hospital on December 16, 1956. He was 38.

After his death, A. A. Allen bought his tent and continued to hold large tent meetings. The Dallas Revival Center was later led by W. V. Grant.

Coe's wife, Rev. Juanita Geneva Scott of Lancaster, Texas, died on September 27, 1996, and was buried in Laurel Land Memorial Park in Dallas. Jack Coe's son, Jack Coe, Jr., also became a preacher with a healing ministry.

== Bibliography ==
- Harrell, David Edwin (1975), All things are possible: the healing & charismatic revivals in modern America, Indiana University Press, ISBN 978-0-253-10090-0
- Robins, R. G. (2010), Pentecostalism in America, ABC-CLIO, ISBN 978-0-313-35294-2
