= First Christian Church =

First Christian Church can refer to any number of local congregations. The name is most frequently associated with congregations of either the Christian Church (Disciples of Christ) or the Independent Christian Churches and Churches of Christ. The name is also used by congregations affiliated with other groups.

First Christian Church, or variations, may refer to the following churches in the United States:

Alabama

- Saint Paul's Methodist Episcopal Church (Anniston, Alabama), also known as First Christian Church, NRHP-listed
- First Christian Church Education Building, Birmingham, Alabama, listed on the National Register of Historic Places (NRHP) in Jefferson County, Alabama

Arizona

- First Christian Church (Phoenix, Arizona), based on an unbuilt Frank Lloyd Wright plan
- First Christian Church (Tucson, Arizona), designed by Arthur T. Brown

Arkansas

- First Christian Church (Lonoke, Arkansas), listed on the NRHP in Lonoke County, Arkansas
- First Christian Church (Nashville, Arkansas), listed on the NRHP in Howard County, Arkansas
- First Christian Church (Paris, Arkansas), listed on the NRHP in Logan County, Arkansas
- First Christian Church (Russellville, Arkansas), listed on the NRHP in Pope County, Arkansas

California

- First Christian Church of Rialto, California, listed on the NRHP in San Bernardino County, California
- First Christian Church (Stockton, California)

Colorado

- First Christian Church (Boulder, Colorado), received landmark designation by Boulder, Colorado, City Council ordinance on June 5, 2012
- First Christian Church (Trinidad, Colorado), listed on the NRHP in Animas County, Colorado

Florida

- First Christian Church (Pensacola, Florida), listed on the NRHP in Escambia County, Florida

Idaho

- First Christian Church (Lewiston, Idaho), listed on the NRHP in Nez Perce County, Idaho

Indiana

- First Christian Church (Columbus, Indiana), a U.S. National Historic Landmark and listed on the NRHP in Bartholomew County, Indiana
- First Christian Church (Wabash, Indiana), listed on the NRHP in Wabash County, Indiana

Iowa

- First Christian Church (Pella, Iowa), listed on the NRHP in Marion County, Iowa

Kentucky

- First Christian Church (Ashland, Kentucky), listed on the NRHP in Boyd County, Kentucky (as First Christian Church of Ashland)
- First Christian Church (Corbin, Kentucky), listed on the NRHP in Whitley County, Kentucky
- First Christian Church (Junction City, Kentucky), listed on the NRHP in Boyle County, Kentucky
- First Christian Church (Louisville, Kentucky), listed on the NRHP in Jefferson County, Kentucky
- First Christian Church (Murray, Kentucky), listed on the NRHP in Calloway County, Kentucky

Missouri

- First Christian Church (Columbia, Missouri), listed on the NRHP in Boone County, Missouri
- First Christian Church (Sweet Springs, Missouri), listed on the NRHP in Saline County, Missouri

North Carolina

- First Christian Church of Burlington, North Carolina, listed on the NRHP in Alamance County, North Carolina
- First Christian Church (Robersonville, North Carolina), listed on the NRHP in Martin County, North Carolina

Oklahoma

- First Christian Church (Lawton, Oklahoma), listed on the NRHP in Comanche County, Oklahoma
- First Christian Church (Oklahoma City, Oklahoma), listed on the NRHP in Oklahoma County, Oklahoma
- First Christian Church (Walker Avenue, Oklahoma City), listed on the NRHP in Oklahoma County, Oklahoma

Tennessee

- First Christian Church (Gleason, Tennessee), listed on the NRHP in Weakley County, Tennessee

Texas

- First Christian Church Parsonage, Belton, Texas, listed on the NRHP in Bell County, Texas
- First Christian Church (Fort Worth, Texas), listed on the NRHP in Tarrant County, Texas

Washington

- First Christian Church (Longview, Washington), listed on the NRHP in Cowlitz County, Washington

== See also ==
- Christian Church (Disciples of Christ)
- Christian churches and churches of Christ, part of the Restoration Movement
- National City Christian Church, Washington, DC
