= DisciplesWorld =

DisciplesWorld was an independent news journal for the Disciples of Christ based in Indianapolis, Indiana. It ran from 2002 to 2009.

Incorporated in 2002, it was managed by a 12-member board of directors. The founders were James Suggs and Robert Friedly. The journal was circulated across the United States and Canada to both churches and private homes. DisciplesWorld ceased publication at the end of 2009.

DisciplesWorld was a successor to The Disciple, the Church's official magazine published by the Christian Board of Publication until it was discontinued in March 2002 for financial reasons. An archive of DisciplesWorld online articles is maintained by Disciples of Christ Historical Society.

== The role of journals in the Christian Church (Disciples of Christ) ==
Beginning with the publication of The Christian Baptist by Alexander Campbell in 1823, journals have played a major role in shaping the thought and dialog of the movement from which the Disciples emerged.

DisciplesWorld tried to keep that publishing tradition alive. Publishing articles on a wide variety of issues for the church, the journal prompted some lively discussions among members across the entire church. As an independent journal, it was free to explore many points of view.
