= Teresa Hord Owens =

American Christian minister

Teresa "Terri" Hord Owens is an American Christian minister who serves as the General Minister and President of the Christian Church (Disciples of Christ) in the United States and Canada. When she was elected in 2017, Owens was the first black woman to lead a mainline denomination as their chief executive.

== Early career ==
Owens graduated from Harvard University in 1982 and subsequently worked in data management at large corporations. After 23 years, she recognized a call to ministry, and went to the University of Chicago Divinity School and Disciples Divinity House, from which she graduated in 2003 with a Master of Divinity. In 2005, she was appointed dean of students of the University of Chicago Divinity School. She served in that position for 15 years.

== General Minister and President ==
In 2017, she was nominated and elected General Minister and President of the Christian Church (Disciples of Christ) in the United States and Canada. She is the first woman of color to lead a mainline Christian denomination in North America, and the second woman to lead the Disciples of Christ. As GMP, she serves as head of communion, pastor to the denomination, and chief executive of the denomination. Since her election, she has appeared at rallies and events of the Poor People's Campaign, guided the Disciples through the COVID-19 pandemic, and facilitated a full communion agreement between the Disciples and the United Church of Canada. In 2021, she was elected Treasurer of the National Council of Churches, becoming part of the first slate of all-female leadership for the ecumenical organization.
