= Elmira J. Dickinson =

American missionary and temperance worker

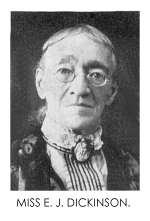
- Born: 1831; Hopkinsville, Kentucky
- Died: 1912 (aged 80–81); Eureka, Illinois
- Occupation(s): missionary, writer and temperance worker

Drawing from Elmira J. Dickinson, A History of Eureka College: With Biographical Sketches and Reminiscences

Elmira J. Dickinson (1831 – 1912) was an American missionary and advocate for temperance.

Dickinson was born in 1831 in Hopkinsville, Kentucky. In 1835 her family moved to the town that is now Eureka, Illinois. Dickinson was a member of the Disciples of Christ as well as the Woman's Christian Temperance Union. Never able to obtain financial support to do foreign missionary work, Dickinson founded the Christian Woman's Board of Missions in Illinois.

In 1894 in Dickinson compiled A History of Eureka College: With Biographical Sketches and Reminiscences, published by the St. Louis, Christian publishing company. 1897 she wrote the Historical Sketch of the Christian Woman's Board of Missions.

Dickinson died in 1912 in Eureka.
