= Disciples Divinity House at Vanderbilt =

Graduate institution in Nashville, Tennessee, US

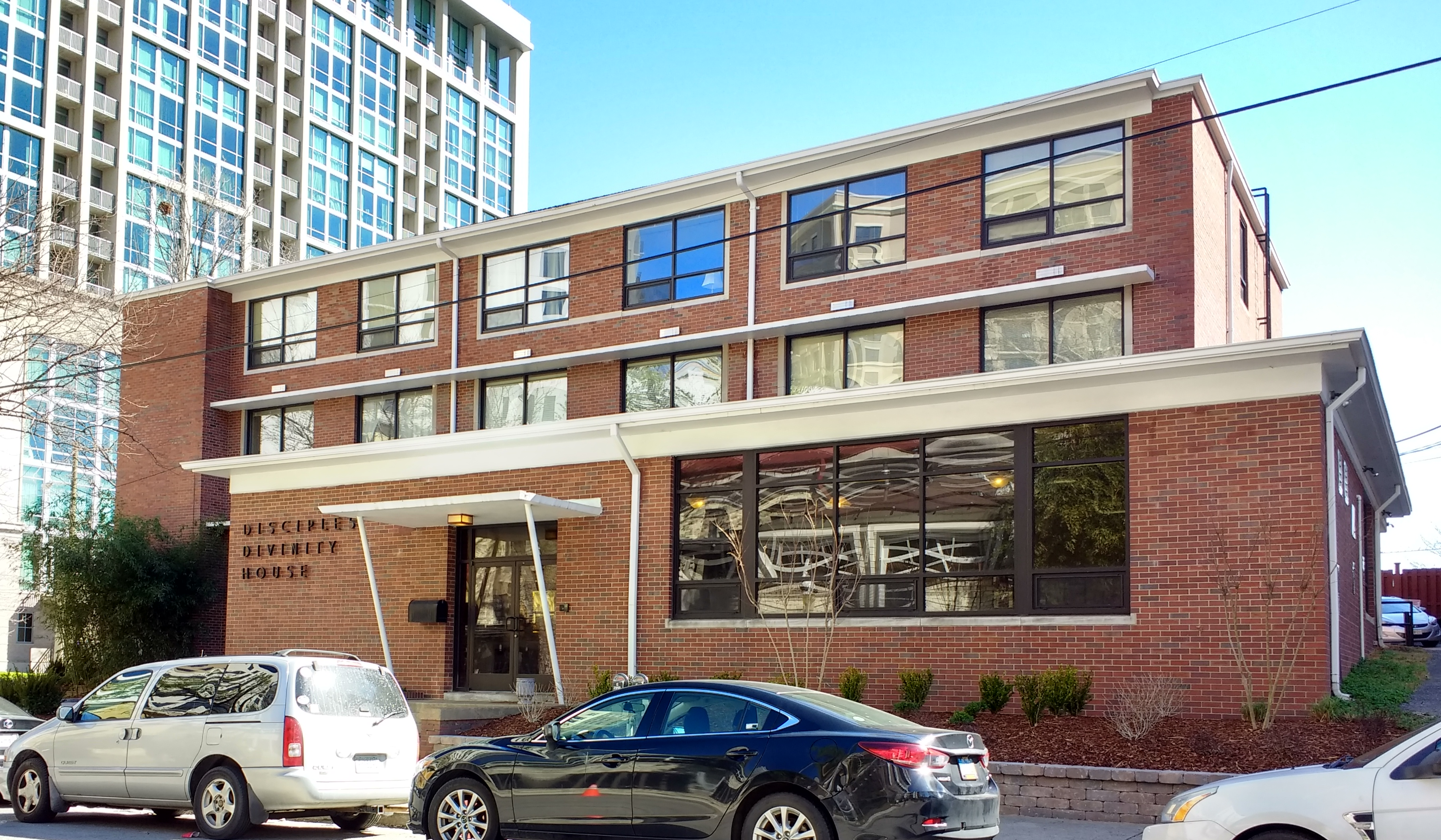
- Type: graduate
- Established: 1942
- Affiliations: Christian Church (Disciples of Christ)
- Dean: Beth Pattillo
- Students: 25
- Location: Nashville, Tennessee, US; 36.1480°N 86.7979°W
- Campus: Urban
- Website: www.discipleshousevandy.org

Disciples Divinity House at Vanderbilt is a graduate institution associated with the Christian Church (Disciples of Christ) and the Vanderbilt University Divinity School.

== History ==
Disciples Divinity House grew out the Disciples Foundation at Vanderbilt that was organized in 1927. The first residence was purchased in 1942 and the organization was officially named Disciples Divinity House. A new facility was purchased in 1959 and later expanded. Currently, it is a scholarship foundation and a home for Disciples at the Divinity School at Vanderbilt. It is a place where Disciples students live and gather for worship and meals, for social events and programming, for study groups and support.
