= First Christian Church of Rialto =

Historic church in California, United States

- U.S. National Register of Historic Places
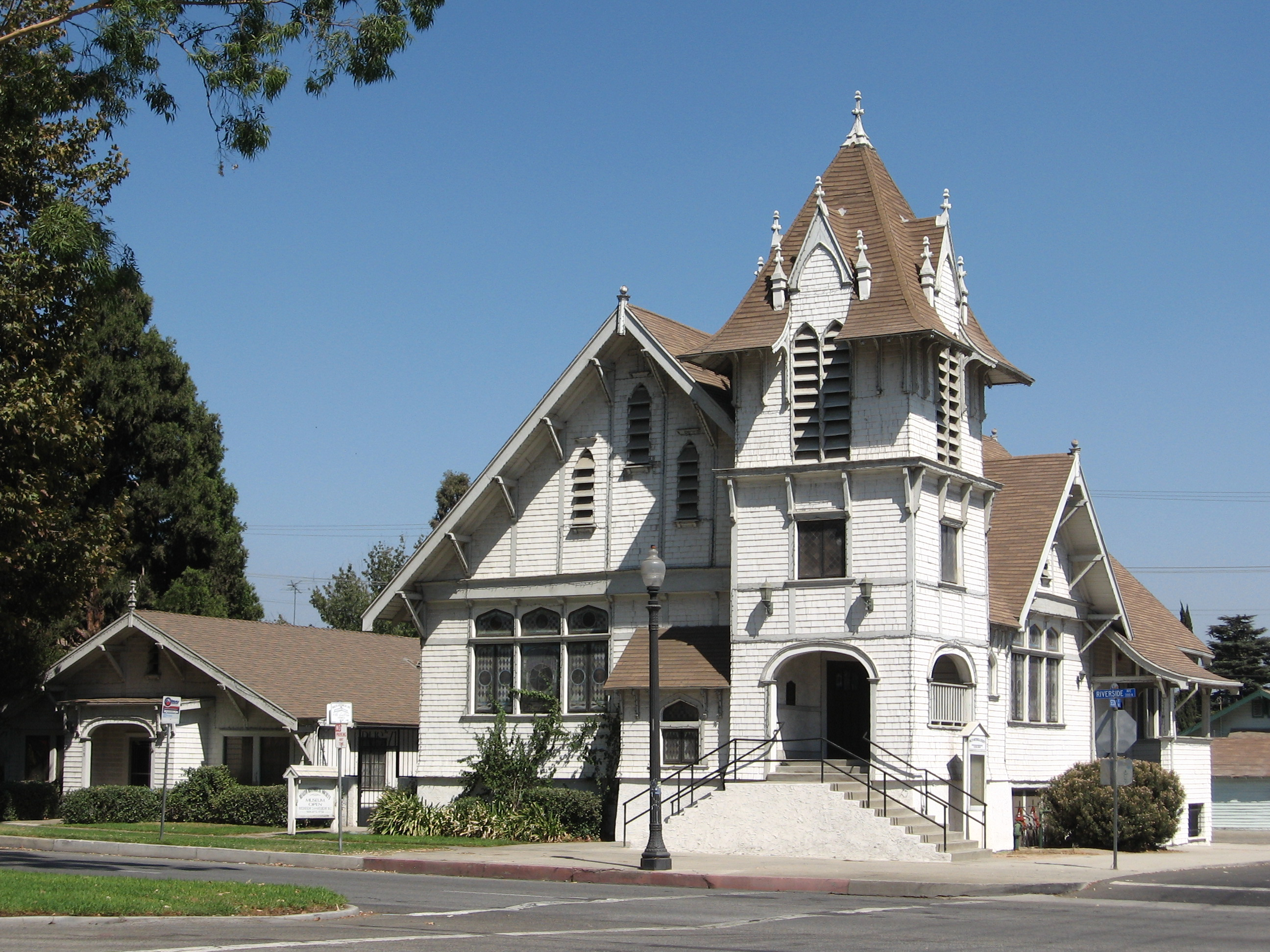

- Location within California Location within the United States
- Location: 201 N. Riverside Ave., Rialto, California
- Coordinates: 34°6′10″N 117°22′9″W
- Area: 0.1 acres (0.040 ha)
- Built: 1906–07
- Architect: Patterson, H. M.
- Architectural style: Late Gothic Revival
- NRHP reference No.: 03000037
- Added to NRHP: February 20, 2003

First Christian Church of Rialto is a historic church located at 201 N. Riverside Avenue in Rialto, California. The church was built from 1906 to 1907 to serve Rialto's First Christian Church, which was founded in 1905. Architect H. M. Patterson designed the church in the Late Gothic Revival style; his design also features elements of the American Craftsman style. The church's design features a gable roof with a corner tower, pointed arch stained glass windows, and louvered vents, all characteristic Gothic Revival features. The Craftsman influence on the design can be seen in its redwood shingled body and roof, its overhanging eaves with ornamental brackets, and its decorative stickwork. The congregation owned the church until 1964, when it was purchased by the City of Rialto to avoid its demolition. It is currently used as a community center.

The church was added to the National Register of Historic Places on February 20, 2003.
