= First Christian Church (Murray, Kentucky) =

Historic church in Kentucky, United States

- U.S. National Register of Historic Places
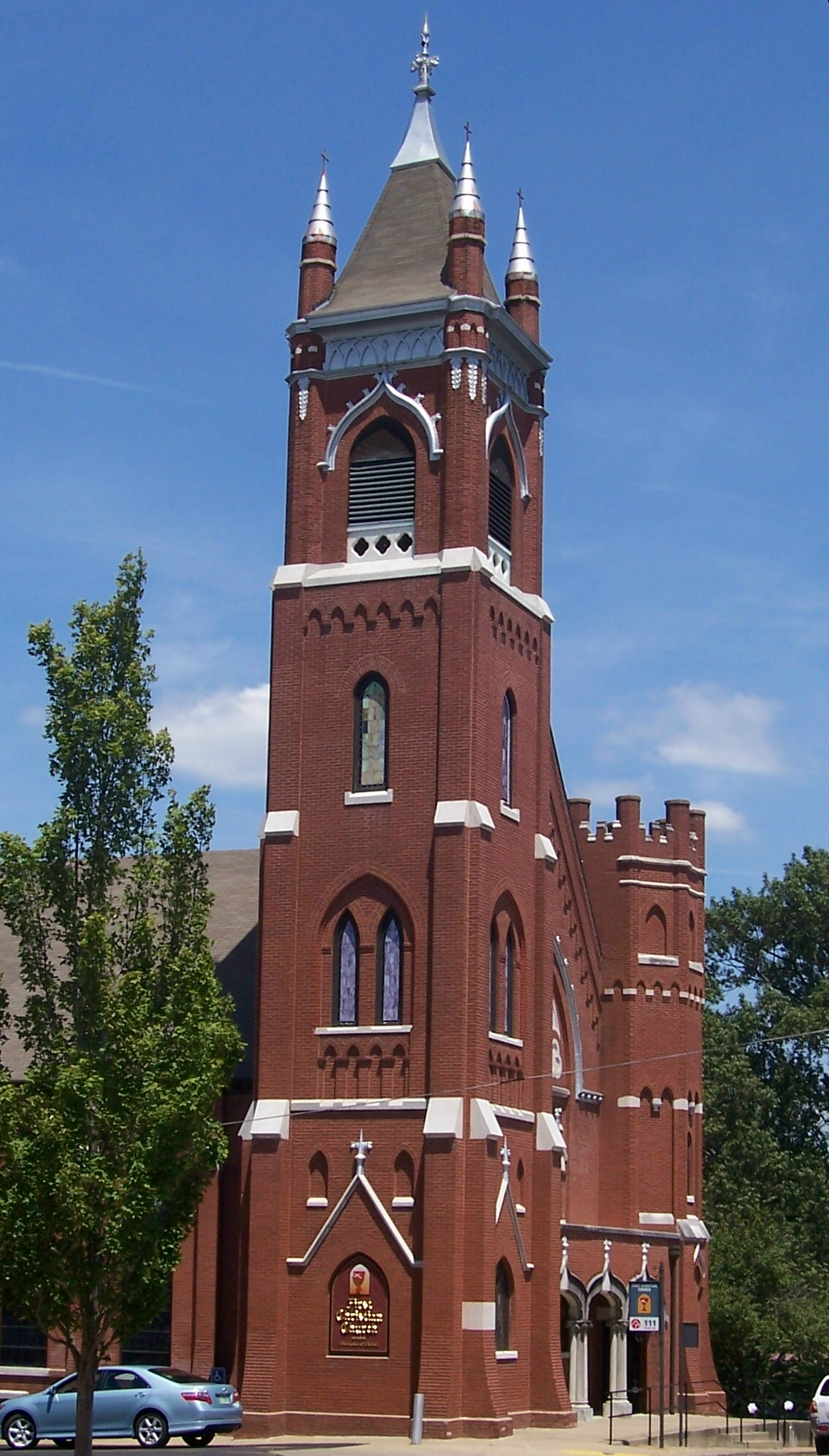

- Location within Kentucky Location within the United States
- Location: 111 N. Fifth St., Murray, Kentucky
- Coordinates: 36°36′41″N 88°18′11″W
- Area: 0.3 acres (0.12 ha)
- Built: 1904
- Built by: Aycock, George
- Architect: Lassiter, A.L.
- Architectural style: Late Gothic Revival
- MPS: Murray Kentucky MRA
- NRHP reference No.: 86000292
- Added to NRHP: February 19, 1986

The First Christian Church in Murray, Kentucky, is a historic Christian Church (Disciples of Christ) church at 111 N. Fifth Street. It was built in 1904 and added to the National Register of Historic Places in 1986.

It was designed by Paducah architect A. L. Lassiter; construction was supervised by George Aycock. It has a central gable and two corner towers and is a striking landmark in Murray.

== See also ==
- National Register of Historic Places listings in Kentucky
