= First Christian Church (Corbin, Kentucky) =

Historic church in Kentucky, United States

- U.S. National Register of Historic Places
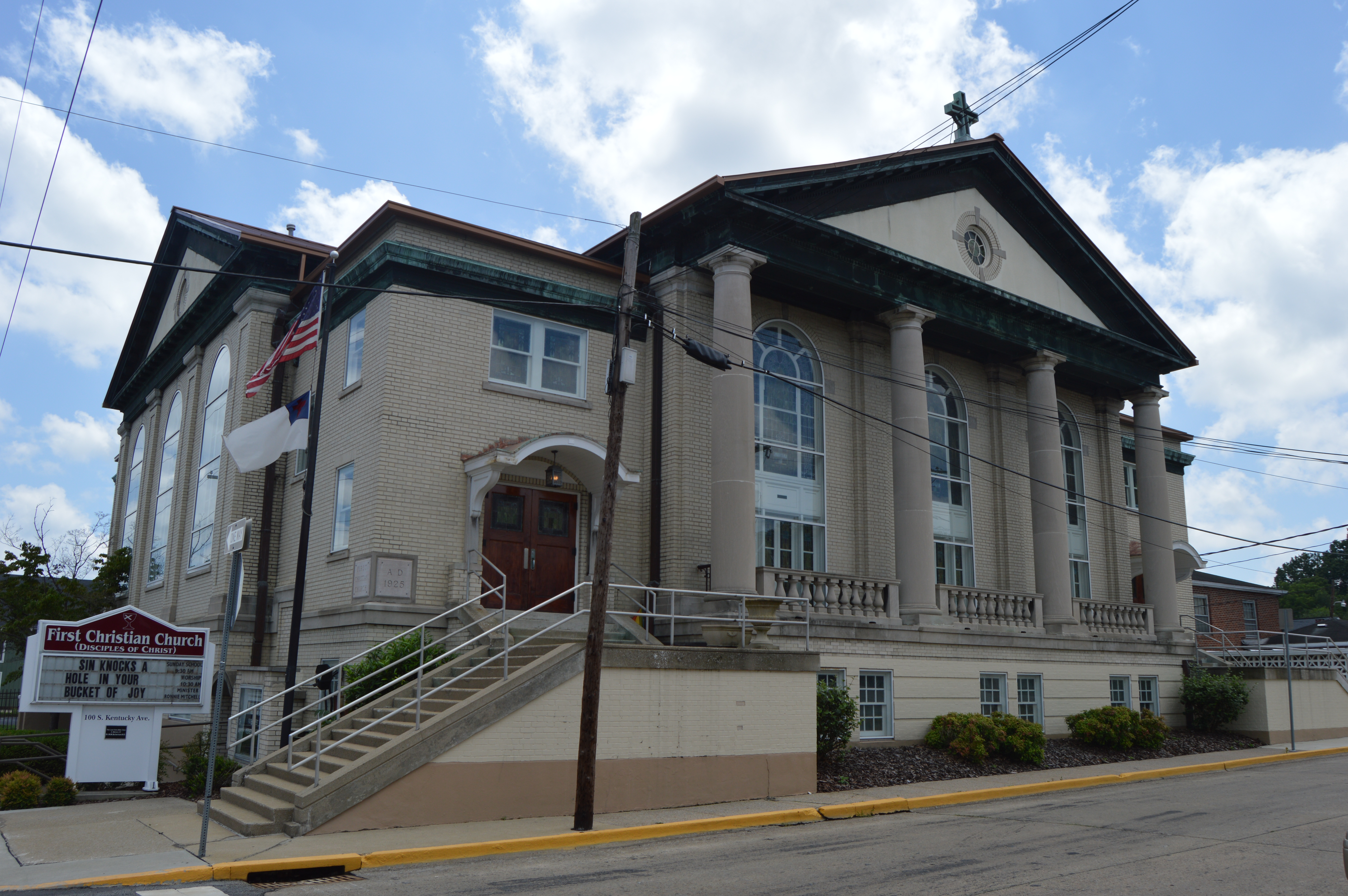
- Front (left) and northern side

- Location within Kentucky Location within the United States
- Location: S. Kentucky and W. First St., Corbin, Kentucky
- Coordinates: 36°56′48″N 84°05′51″W
- Area: 0.2 acres (0.081 ha)
- Built: 1925
- Architect: Honeywell, A.A.
- Architectural style: Classical Revival
- MPS: Corbin MRA
- NRHP reference No.: 86000693
- Added to NRHP: March 28, 1986

The First Christian Church in Corbin, Kentucky, is a historic Christian Church at S. Kentucky and W. First Street. It was built in 1925 and added to the National Register of Historic Places in 1986.

Its building is a two-story (20 foot) brick Classical Revival-style building with brick laid in Flemish bond, with brick pilasters and a two-story pedimented portico.
