= First Christian Church (Stockton, California) =

Church in Stockton, California

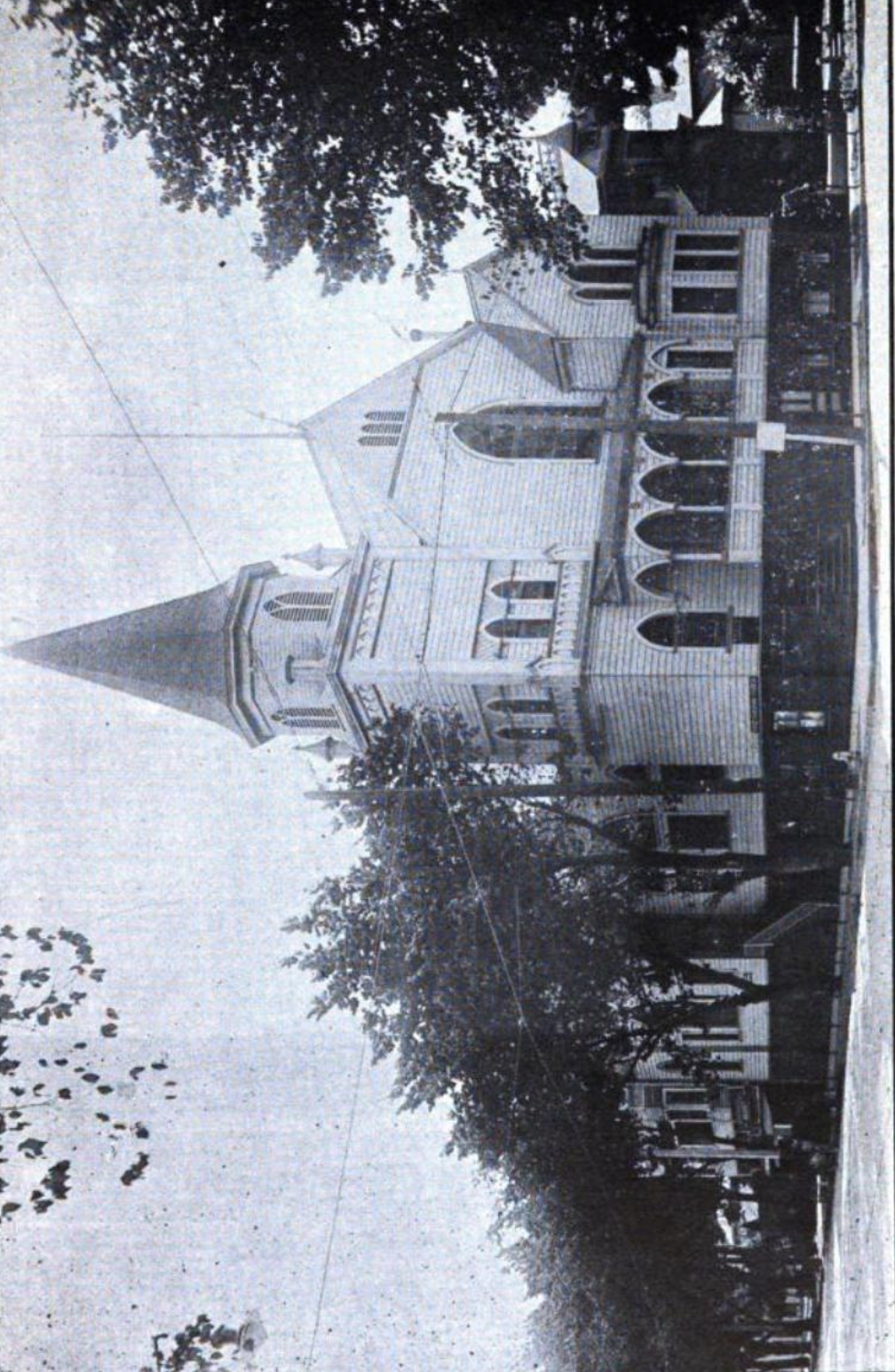
The 1899 church building (1916)

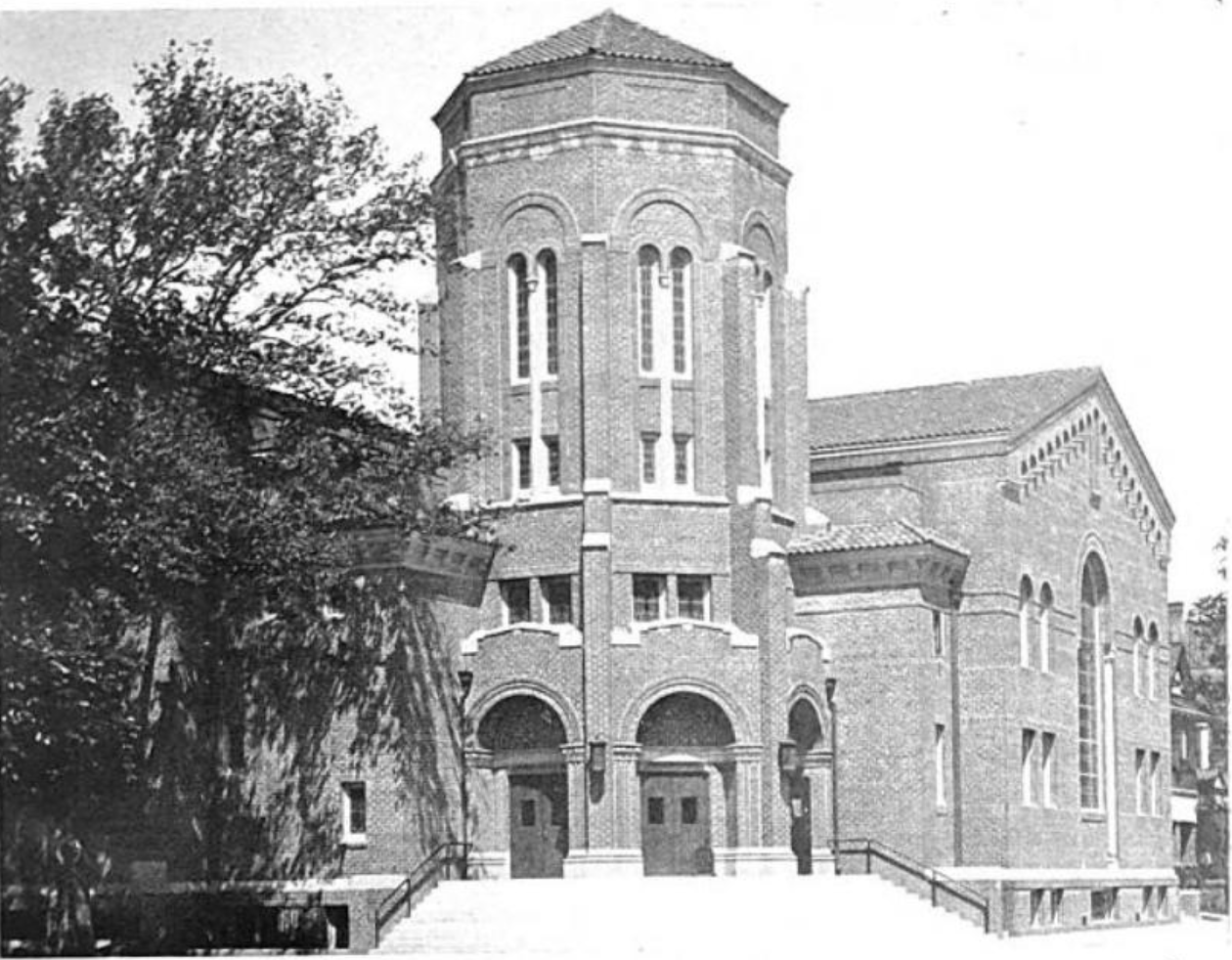
The 1924 church building (1925)

First Christian Church was a historic church in Stockton, California. Established in 1851, it was the first congregation of Christian Church (Disciples of Christ) organized in California. The first baptism performed in the San Joaquin Valley occurred at the First Christian Church on February 22, 1852. The church became defunct in the 21st-century.

== 19th-century ==
Thomas Thompson, the first Disciple preacher in California, arrived in the mines in the fall of 1849, but when winter approached, he went with his family to Santa Clara, California and preached in that section until spring, when the family and all came back to Colma, California near Sutter's Fort, and kept a miners' home there. In the winter of 1850 and 1851, he was in Stockton, and gathered the scattered Disciples together and preached to them in a small hall overhead, on the corner of San Joaquin street and Weber avenue. Thompson organized 21 members into a worshiping congregation in August 1851. The church had no house of worship so it met at the home of J. D. Green. The first elders were W. B. Smith and A. N. Green, who, with W. C. and Samuel Miller, brothers, were among the charter members.

W. W. Stevenson, a preacher from Arkansas, was elected an elder in January 1852, and thereafter ministered to the church. The first baptism performed in the San Joaquin Valley occurred at the First Christian Church on February 22, 1852. In June 1852, the meeting place was changed to the home of J. S. Smith, and later again to the home of J. D. Green, 6 miles (9.7 km) in the country. Under the ministry of W. W. Stevenson, the first efforts to secure a meeting house were made. In August 1852, a deed was filed for a lot of ground to building a meeting house. The lot was donated to the church by J. D. Green and his wife. A small, two-story frame building was later purchased and in May 1853, the congregation met for the first time in their meeting house, which was formerly used as a store, but later moved to a new lot at the expense of about US$1,250. This lot was later occupied by the Union Safe Deposit Bank at 30 North San Joaquin Street. The church house on San Joaquin Street was not used continuously, the congregation assembling at the home of J. D. Green much of the time.

In March 1855, meetings were held in the Greenwood school house. There was no preacher so various members of the church spoke and occasionally, another pioneer preacher, was present and preached. During this summer, the church seems to have become a "Union church", and on December 31, they selected two evangelists to canvass the district on behalf of the Union Church of Christ. In March 1856, the union church was dissolved by unanimous consent. In April 1858, the congregation reorganized as the Stockton Church of Christ. In the spring of 1859, the sale of the property on San Joaquin Street was closed and preparations were made under the leadership of a new pastor to buy or build. September 1860 marked the second purchase of property for the church, a house and lot on Lindsay Street, near the northeast corner of Lindsay and Hunter Street, at US$2,000.

The next property project was recorded in November 1871, with the purchase of the house and lot of the Cumberland Presbyterian Church located on Sutter Street (later, the location of Wilson's Confectionery). The purchase was completed in early 1872. In this place, they worshiped for more than ten years. Among the preachers who served the church during these years were: Thompson, Stevenson, John O. White, Dr. Downing, Pendegast, L. J. Correl, W. W. Carter, J. P. McCorkle, N. Ε. Corey, H. D. Connell, Thomas Porter, Alexander Johnston and L. B. Wilkes.

Articles of incorporation of "The First Christian Church" meeting in Stockton were filed in July 1891. The directors for the first year were P. S. Wilkes, W. C. Miller, G. Dahl, M. A. D. Long, and A. D. March. In August 1891, the congregation received permission to sell its Sutter Street property, after which, it relocated to the Masonic Hall.

=== State Meetings ===
In 1855, the first State Meeting, or convention, of the Disciples was held at Stockton. It was a small gathering by the Stockton brethren and their friends. They continued to meet in the "upper room" on San Joaquin street. The delegates to that meeting from Stockton were W. C. Miller, N. A. Green and W. W. Stevenson. The preachers present at that meeting were: Thomas Thompson, W. W. Stevenson, Byrum Lewis, William Higgins, J. K. Rule, and Joshua Lawson. The convention met on October 17, and continued in session three days.

In 1868, the Stockton Church again helped to entertain a State Meeting, which had grown since the first one held in that "upper room" in 1855. Another was held there in 1873, and the last one to which Stockton contributed in the way of preparation and entertainment was held at Lockford, a suburb of Stockton, in 1885.

=== Early notable people ===
The directors for the first year were P. S. Wilkes, W. C. Miller, G. Dahl, M. A. D. Long, and A. D. March.

Among the preachers who served the church during the years preceding the administration of Thomas A. Boyer, were: Thompson, Stevenson, John O. White, Dr. Downing, Pendegast, L. J. Correl, W. W. Carter, J. P. McCorkle, N. Ε. Corey, H. D. Connell, Thomas Porter, Alexander Johnston and L. B. Wilkes.

== 20th-century ==
=== 1899 building ===
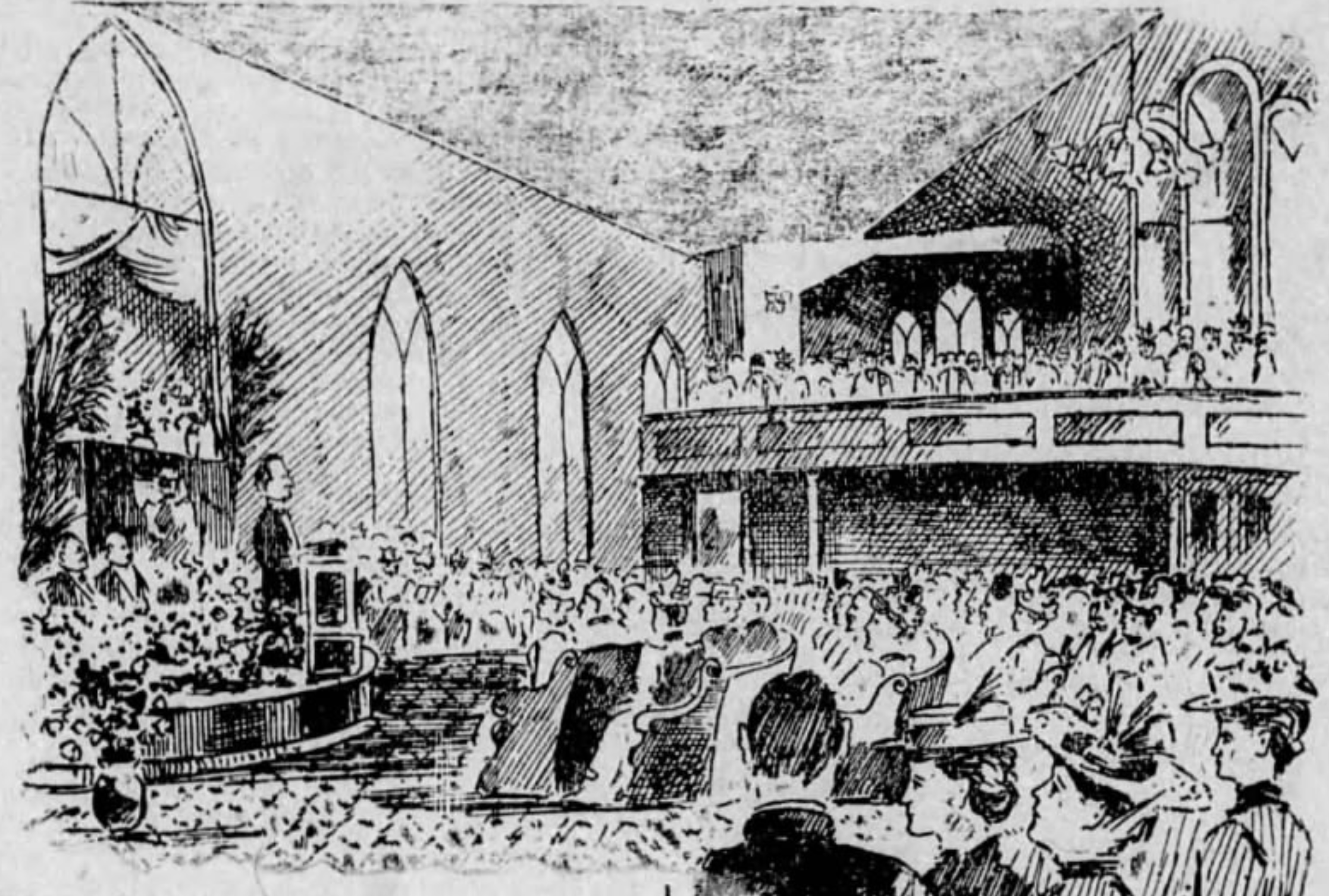
First Christian Church dedication (April 30, 1899)

Thomas A. Boyer came to the congregation in 1896. He at once caught the vision of a church home commensurate with the progress of the city. In April 1899, a building on California street was dedicated and opened to the people. It was built under the supervision of Thomas A. Boyer.

In 1916, the Stockton Church had an enrolled membership of about 400.

Thomas A. Boyer was succeeded by Thomas H. Lawson. Other preachers who served the church since Boyer were: C. W. Jopson, T. H. Lawson, G. L. Lobdell, and E. V. Stivers.

=== 1924 building ===
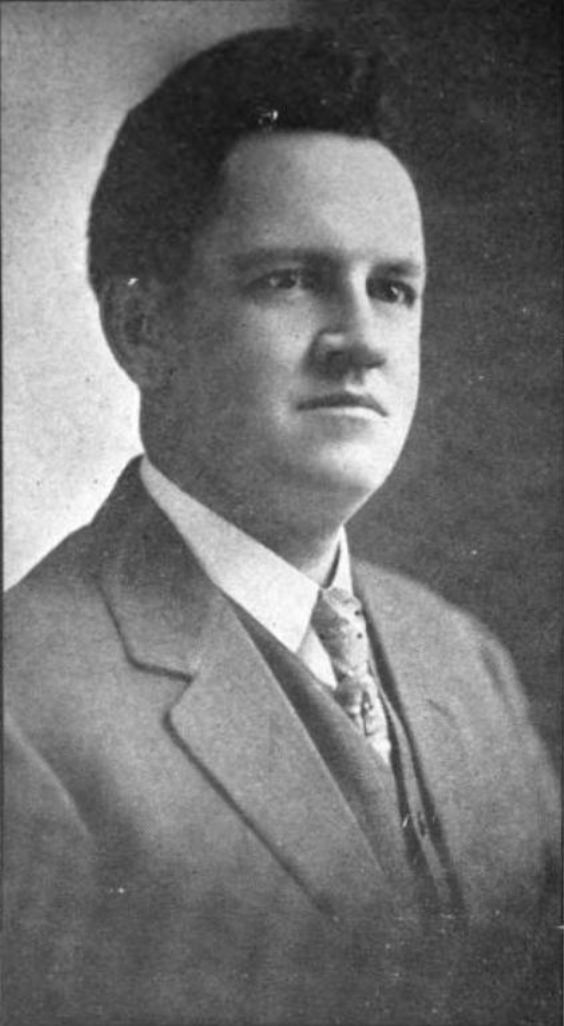
Elijah V. Stivers, pastor (1916)

In 1920, Elijah Stivers, together with the officers of the church, secured an option upon the site fronting Fremont Park at the corner of Sutter and Lindsay Streets. Subsequently, the growth of the funds, first the lot fund and later the building fund occurred. In June 1920, Robert H. Orr, church architectural specialist of Los Angeles, was commissioned by the church to draw tentative plans. Through two and a half years, the studies continued until the final plans were adopted. Early in 1922, US$20,000 in cash an pledges were secured, making both the new site and old property free from encumbrance.

The last building constructed in Stockton with the name "First Christian Church" was located at 400 North Sutter Street, at the corner of East Lindsay Street. The cornerstone was laid on March 30, 1924. The architecture style was Adapted Italian Romanesque, with an ecclesiastical theme carried throughout, the building being unique in the West. Construction cost US$150,000. O. H. Chain was the general contractor. The building was dedicated and opened to the public on November 30, 1924. At the time, there were 700 active members and the pastor was Shirley R. Shaw.

==== Architecture and fittings ====
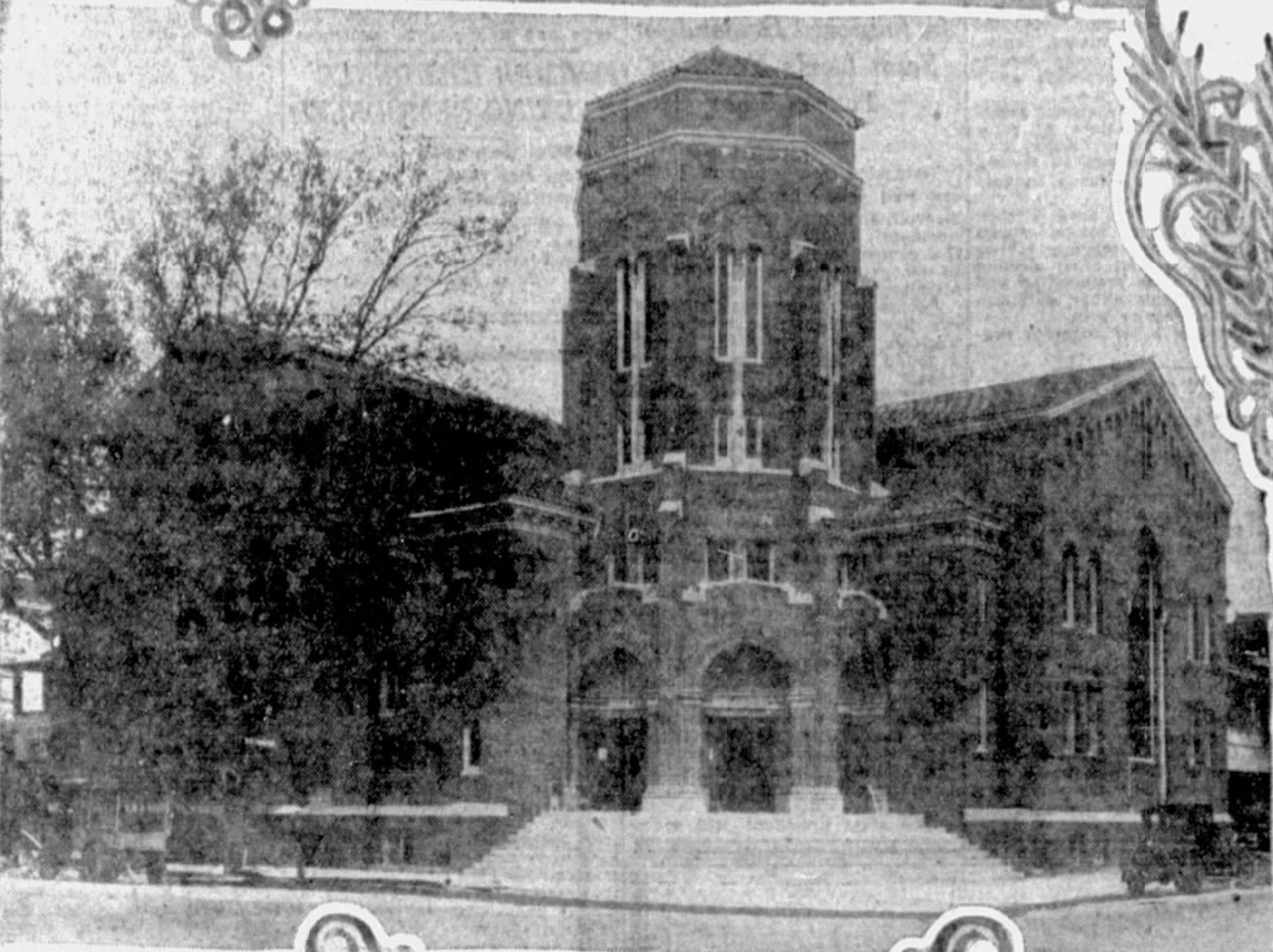
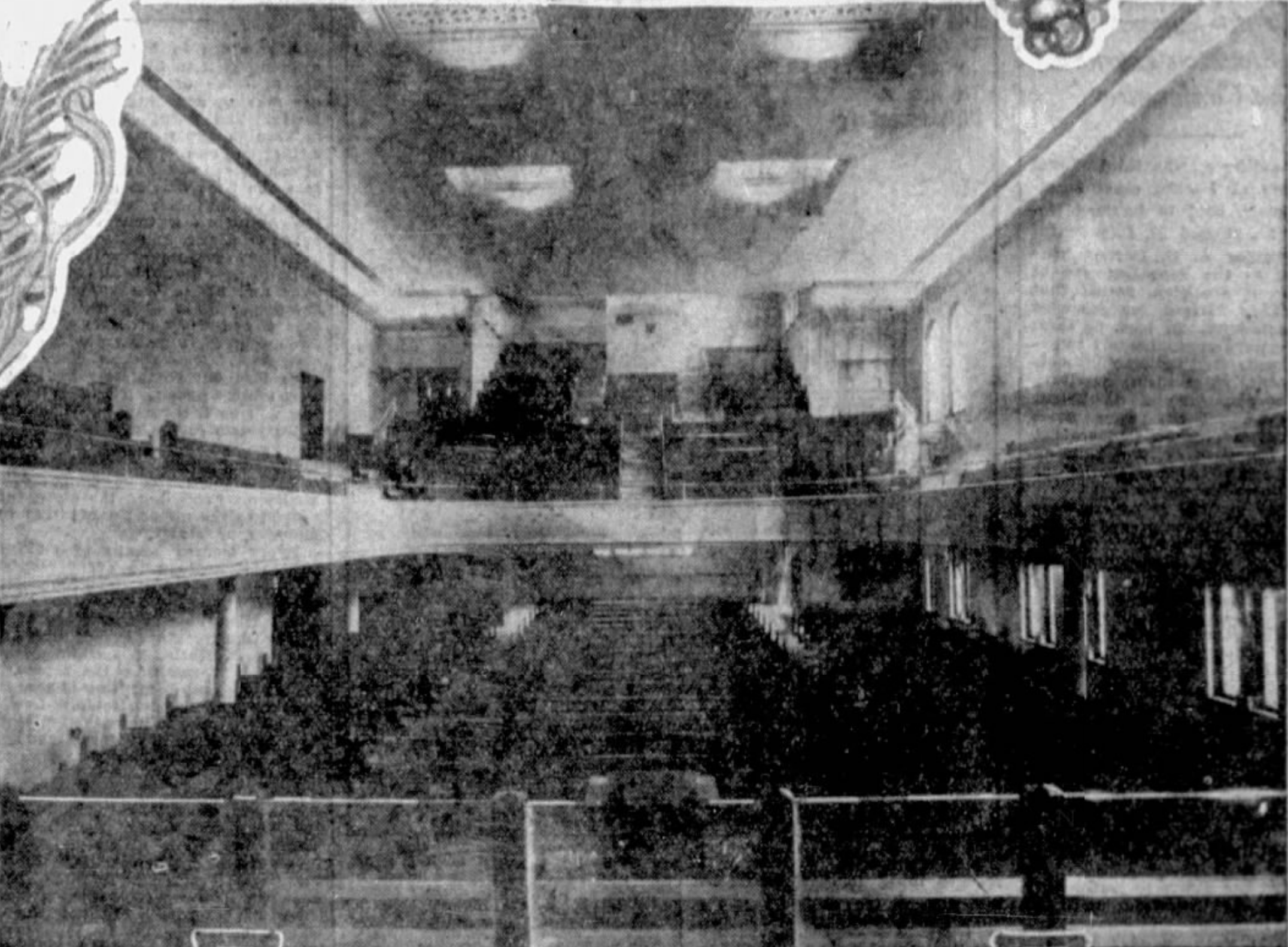
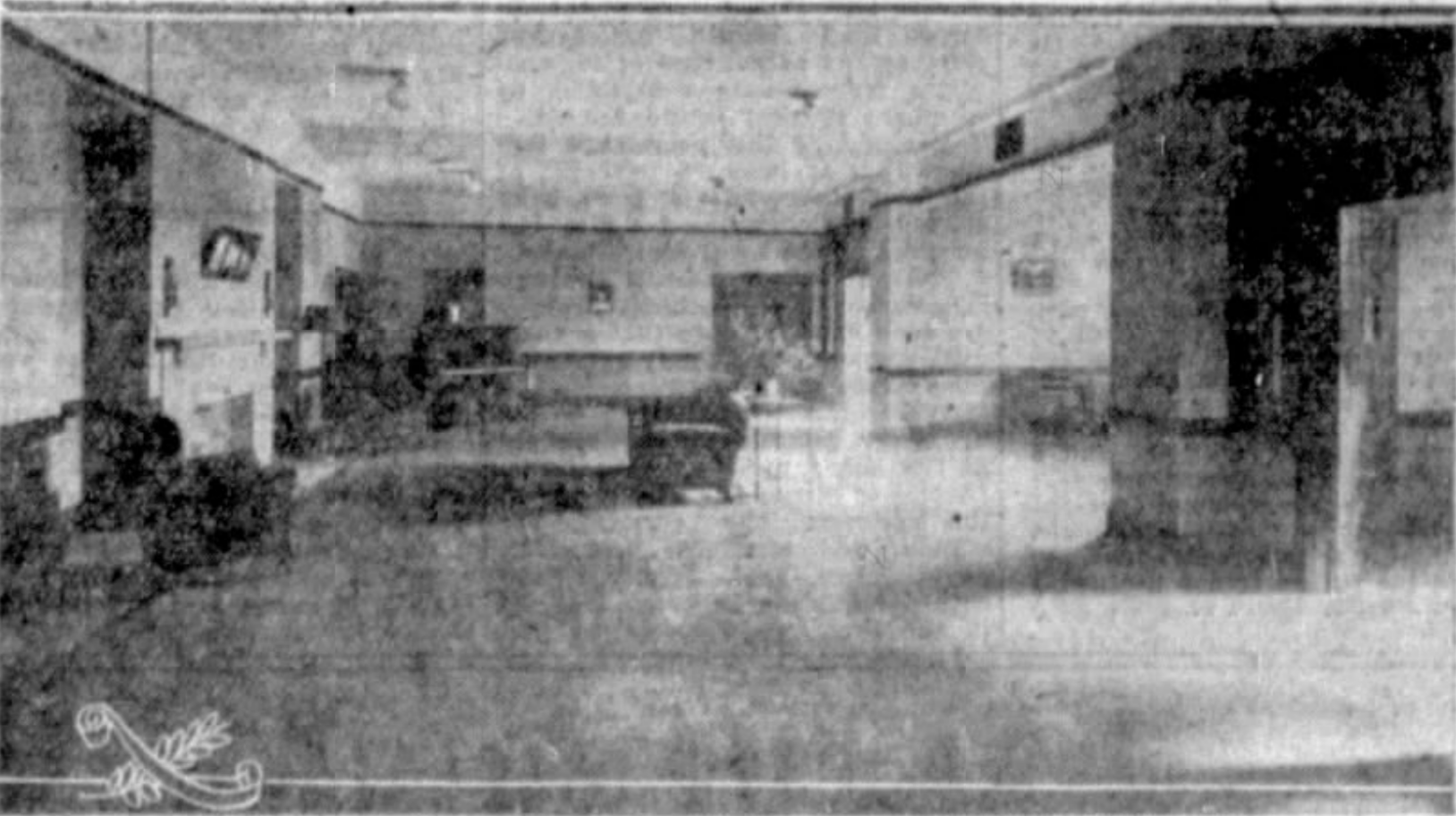
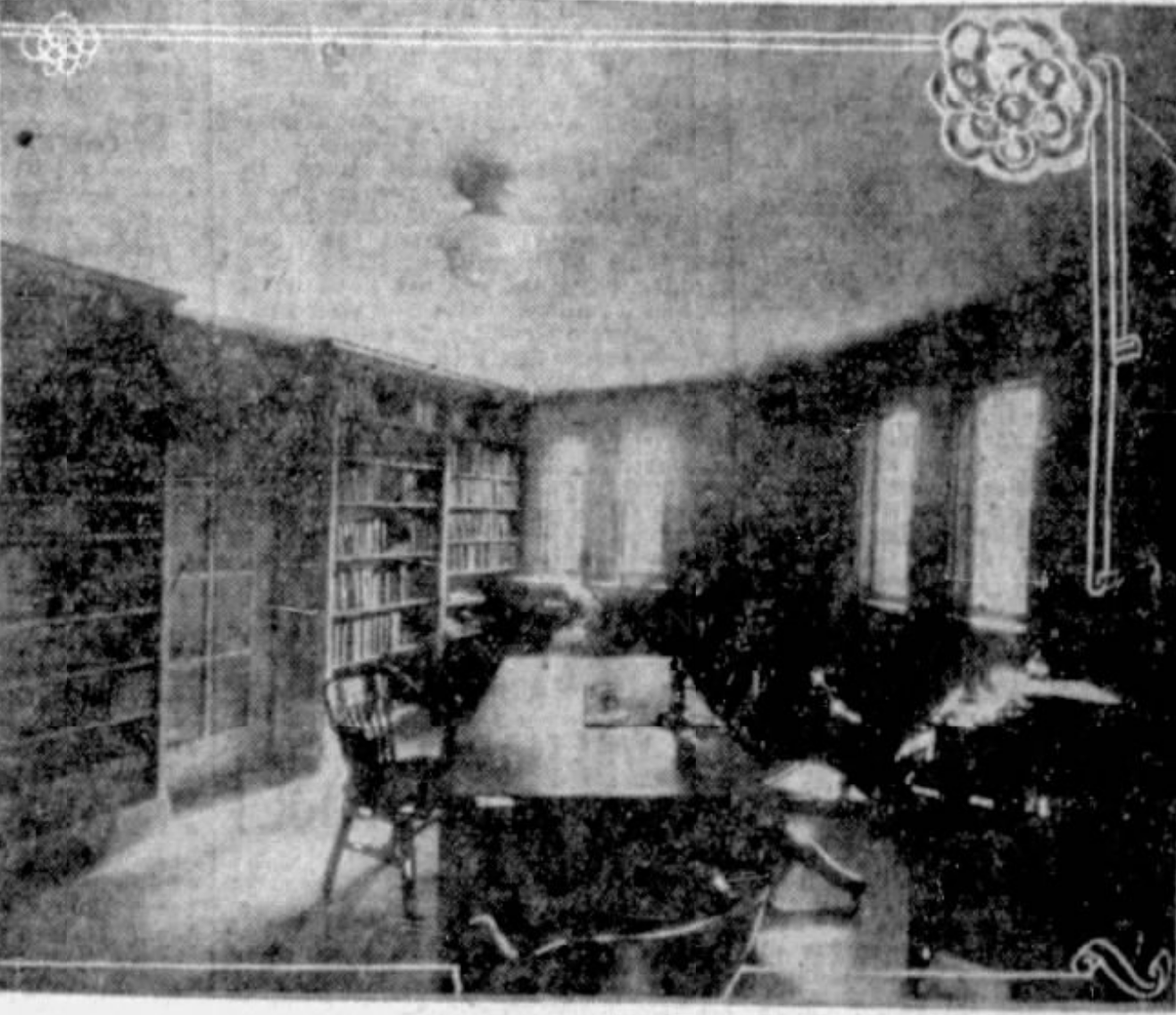
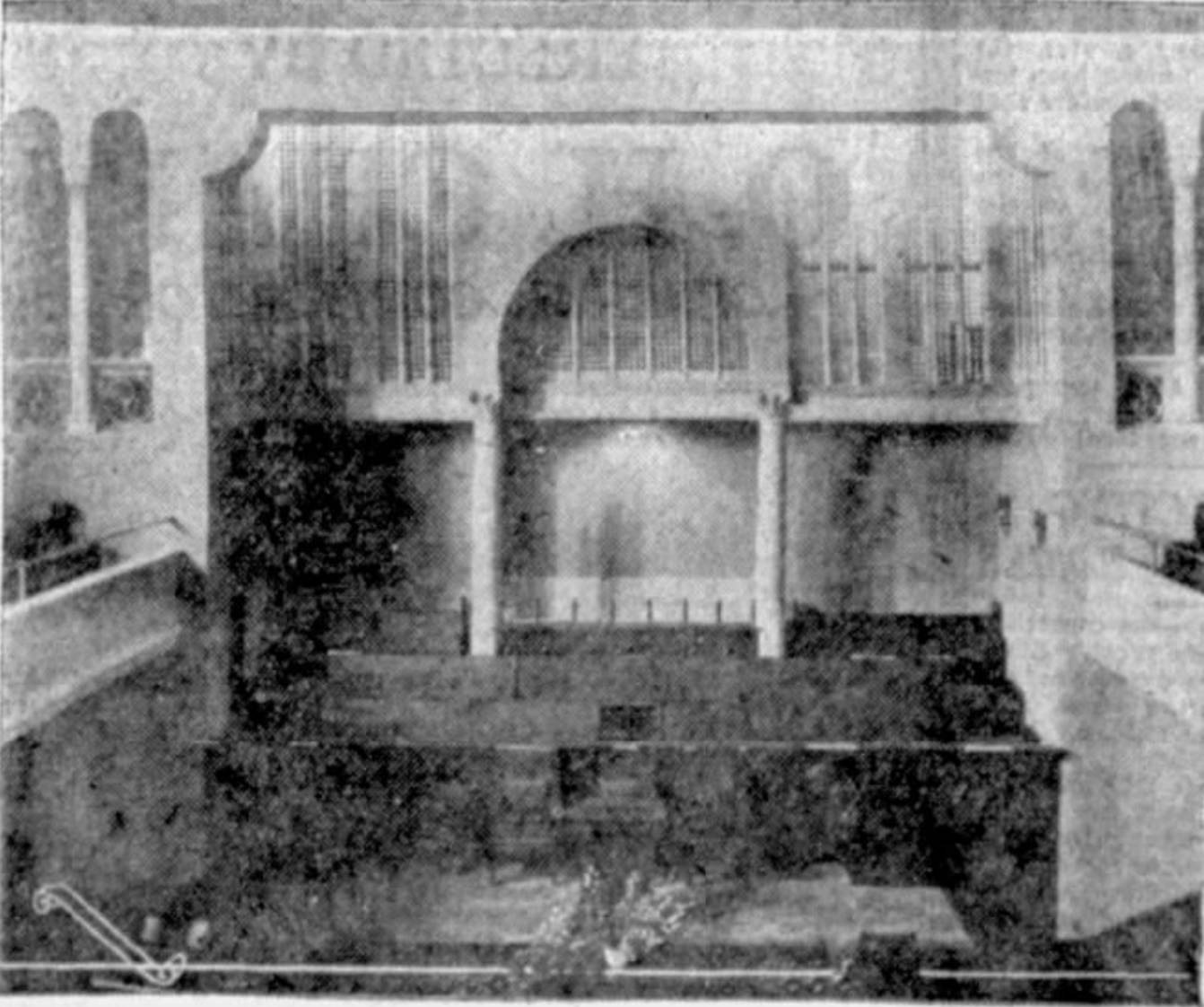
November 1924

The building featured brick and terracotta patterns. The main entrance to the church was on the corner and featured wide circular steps at the base of a tower octagonal in shape, rising to a height of 80 feet (24 m). The principal foyer gave direct approach to the ground floor, to the balcony, by means of a stairway, and had two entrances to the main auditorium and one to the social hall. Off the foyer was a room for the ushers. The foyer was octagonal in shape, the same as the tower, with a beam ceiling effect, tile floor, and ornamental work in old ivory. In the center was a large electric chandelier of the Romanesque type. The auditorium contained twisted columns with scroll and capt, as well as grill-work for the pipe organ. The stairs from the gallery came down at each side of the rostrum. The pews were of stained oak, with Romanesque pew ends. A fireproof motion picture booth was in the balcony. The baptistry was placed behind the choir loft, which was just back of the rostrum. Separate entrances to the baptistry for men and women lead from separate, individual robing rooms and lavatories. On the mezzanine floor on which these were placed was also the choir room, containing cases for the filling of sheet music, and a room for the preparation of the elements of the holy communion. The west and south elevation had large art glass windows portraying scenes from the life and ministry of Christ. Art glass windows featured imported cathedral amber glass. There was a tile roof. The main walls were of masonry. Corridor carpets were of cork; other carpets were of heather. More than 1,000 persons could be seated in the main auditorium. At the rear of the auditorium was a lecture room that could be added to the auditorium by the opening of doors and thus, 20 more persons could be accommodated.

Embedded within the cornerstone was a copper box containing a copy of the Bible, a historical record of the church, lists of officers and members, copies of religious and local daily newspapers, and other keepsakes.

The building was departmentalized so as to provide religious education according to public school age, having separate quarters for all ages from infants to adulthood, and with enclosed classrooms for children. Each department had its individual auditorium with a stage, as well as kitchens not accessible to the big kitchen. The capacity of the Sunday school was 1,000.

== 21st-century ==
The last physical address of the church was 1234 William Moss Boulevard. The church's website, www.fccstockton.org, is no longer active.
