= First Christian Church (Pensacola, Florida) =

Historic church in Florida, United States

- U.S. National Register of Historic Places
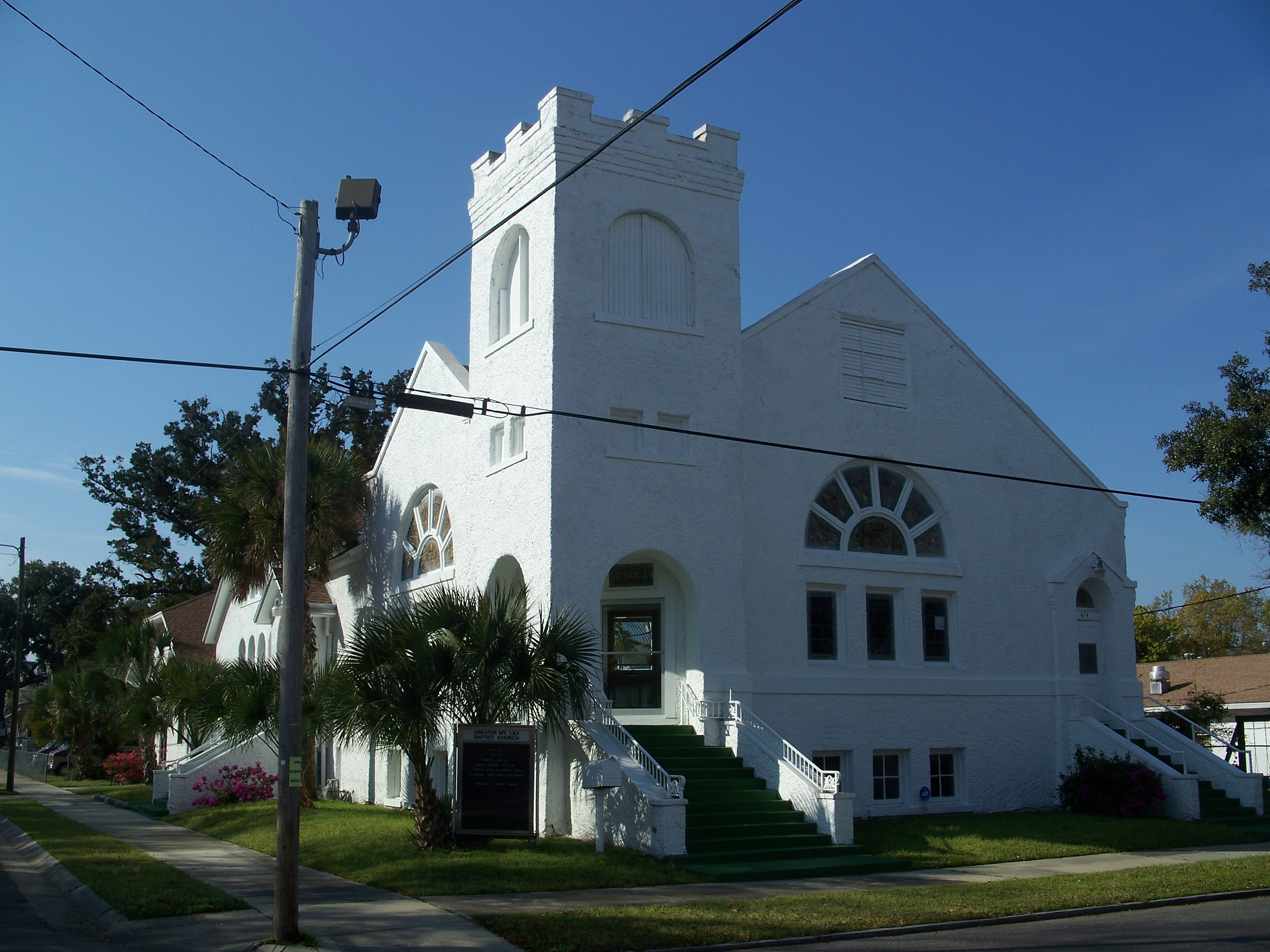

- Location within Florida Location within the United States
- Location: Pensacola, Florida
- Coordinates: 30°25′17″N 87°12′33″W
- NRHP reference No.: 94000350
- Added to NRHP: April 14, 1994

The First Christian Church (also known as the Greater Mount Lily Baptist Church) is an historic church in Pensacola, Florida. It is located at 619 East Gadsden Street. On April 14, 1994, it was added to the U.S. National Register of Historic Places.

== References and external links ==
- Escambia County listings at National Register of Historic Places
- Florida's Office of Cultural and Historical Programs
  - Escambia County listings
  - Greater Mount Lily Baptist Church
