= Disciples Divinity House =

Christian seminary in Chicago, Illinois, US

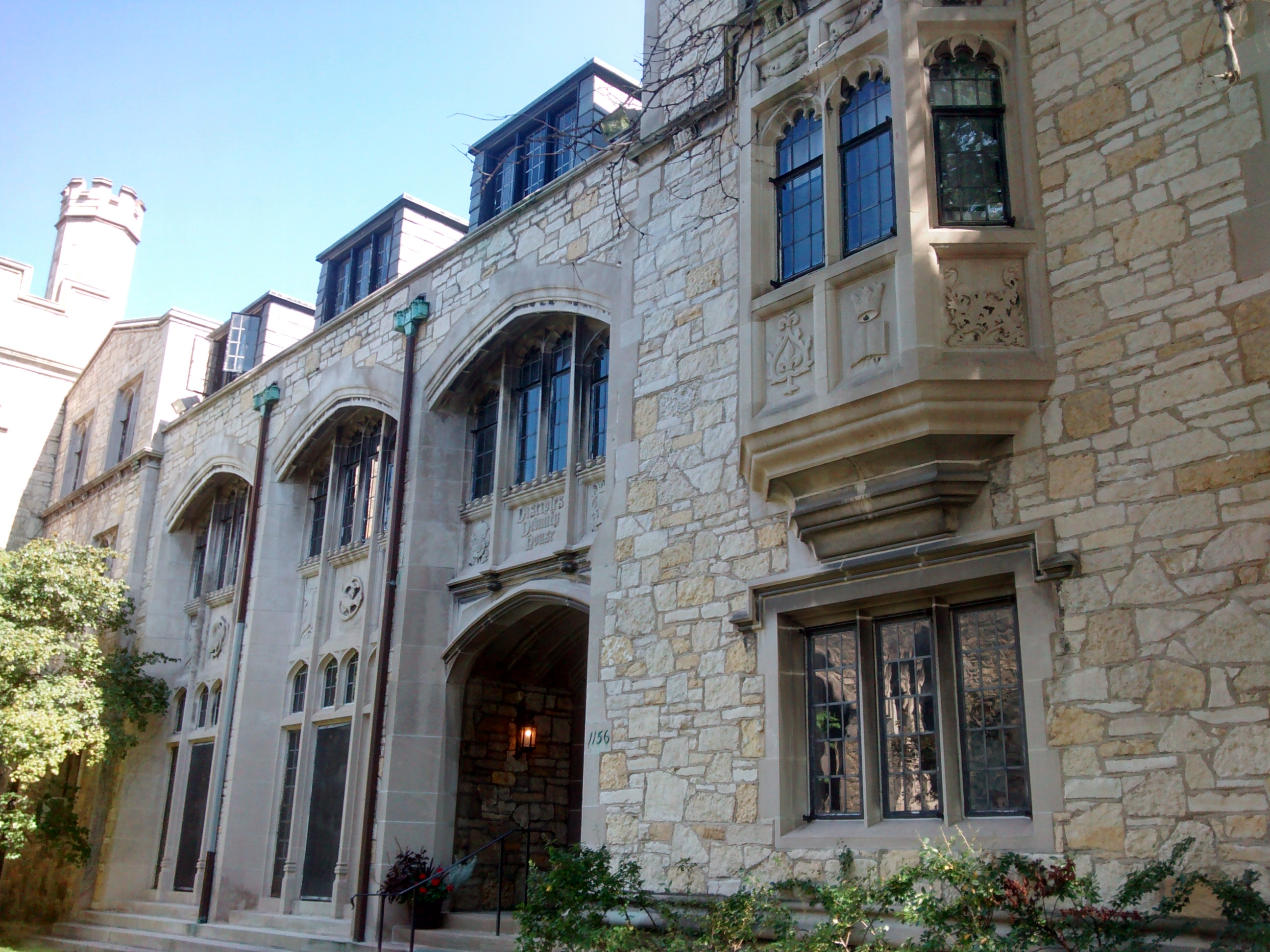
- Motto: Let knowledge grow from more to more
- Type: Graduate
- Established: 1894
- Affiliations: Christian Church (Disciples of Christ)
- Dean: Kristine A. Culp
- Students: 25
- Location: Chicago, Illinois, US; 41.7916°N 87.5978°W
- Campus: Urban
- Website: ddh.uchicago.edu

Disciples Divinity House of the University of Chicago is a Christian seminary associated with the Christian Church (Disciples of Christ) and the University of Chicago Divinity School.

== History ==
Disciples Divinity House originated through the effort of W. D. MacClintock, an English professor at the University of Chicago, and Herbert L. Willett; the school was chartered in 1894. By 1898 there were 20 students. The current limestone facility was completed in 1928.
