= Disciples of Christ Historical Society =

Disciples of Christ Historical Society is the official archives for congregations of the Stone-Campbell Movement, also known as the Restoration Movement. The Society is incorporated as a general ministry of the Christian Church (Disciples of Christ) and serves all three branches (called "streams") of the Movement: the Churches of Christ, Christian churches and churches of Christ, and the Disciples.

The Stone-Campbell Movement began on the Appalachian frontier in the early 1800s and is named for the men recognized as its founders and early leaders, Barton Warren Stone (1772–1844) and Alexander Campbell (1788–1866).

== History ==
Disciples of Christ Historical Society was founded in 1941 and, from 1952 to 2015, was located in Nashville, Tennessee, where the Society was housed in the Thomas W. Phillips Memorial Archives, built in 1958 and placed on the National Register of Historic Places in 2006. The building is remarkable for its late Gothic Revival limestone façade and numerous stained glass windows.

In 2016, DCHS moved to a new office/meeting space in Bethany, West Virginia. The modern archival facility is adjacent to the grounds of Bethany College and the historic Campbell mansion. The location hails back to the importance spiritual ancestors, Alexander & Thomas Campbell, placed on education. Relocation of the Disciples of Christ Historical Society to Bethany offers opportunities for student-workers, the use of Historic Bethany and classroom-laboratory partnerships in church history and library science

== Holdings ==
The Society holds the historic records of approximately 23,000 congregations, 40,000 bibliographic files, as well as personal papers of 35,000 members of the denomination. The archives also house over 300,000 historic photographs. Among its more unusual holdings is a necklace made of leopard’s teeth from the Belgian Congo (now the Democratic Republic of the Congo), brought to the United States by Disciples missionary Royal J. Dye.

In 2006, the Society partnered with the Christian Board of Publications to underwrite the publication of the first-ever global history of the Stone-Campbell tradition.

In 2008, the Society opened a public exhibit hall to highlight and interpret its collections.

In 2011, the Society established a collection of local church cookbooks in a new effort to depict local church history.
