= First Christian Church (Junction City, Kentucky) =

Historic church in Kentucky, United States

- U.S. National Register of Historic Places
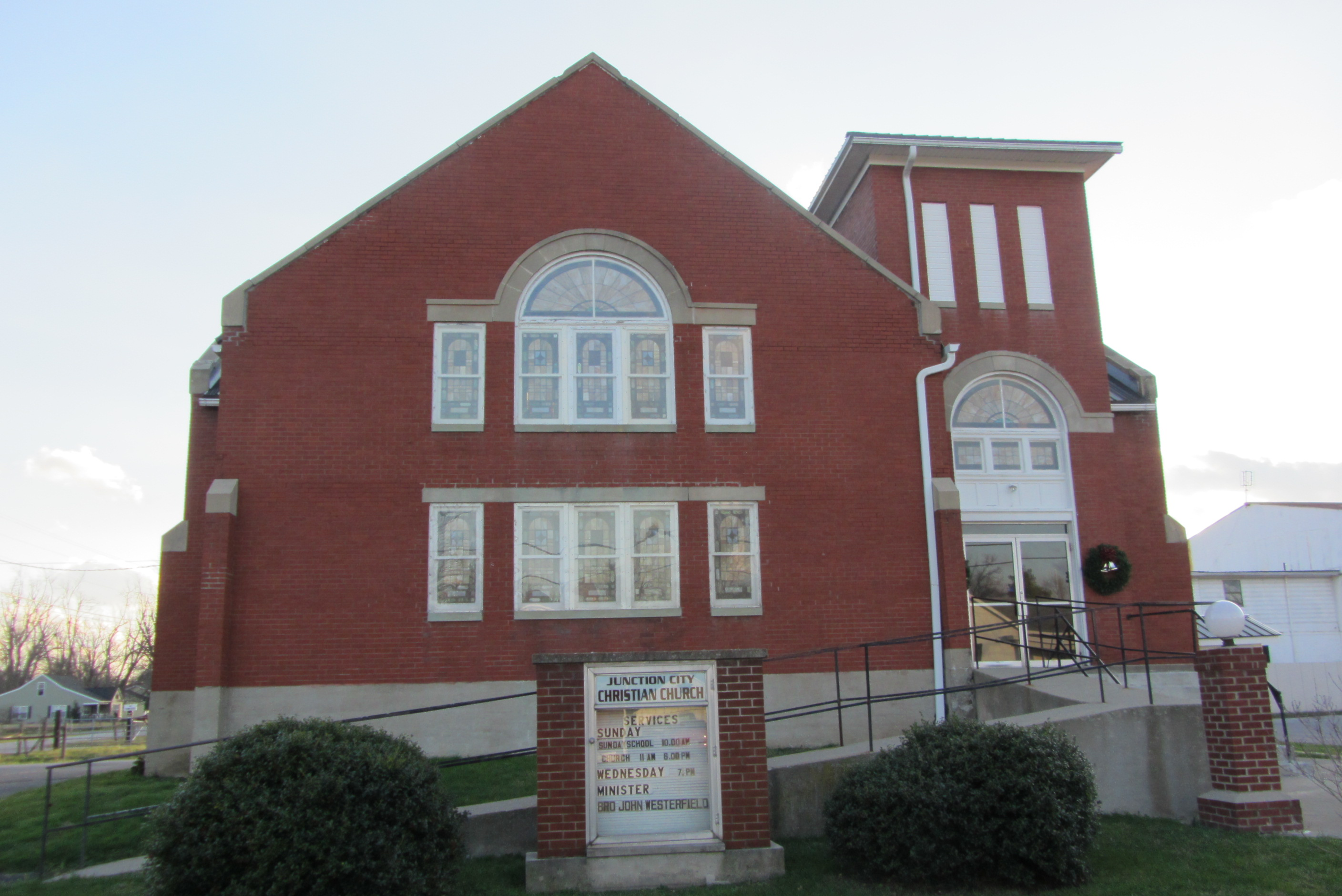
- Church front in 2012

- Location within Kentucky Location within the United States
- Location: Jct. of Shelby and Cemetery Sts., Junction City, Kentucky
- Coordinates: 37°35′5″N 84°47′29″W
- Area: less than one acre
- Built: 1932
- MPS: Boyle MPS
- NRHP reference No.: 98000331
- Added to NRHP: April 9, 1998

The First Christian Church in Junction City, Kentucky, is a historic Christian church at the junction of Shelby and Cemetery Streets. It was built in 1932 and added to the National Register of Historic Places in 1998.

It was deemed notable " as a locally significant Period Revival interpretation of the early Christian Byzantine churches, with low massing and restrained ornament. It is of brick masonry with formed concrete basement foundation built on an "L" plan with intersecting gable roofs joined with a two-story vestibule/tower entry. Design details include large, stained glass, arch-headed windows centered in both gable ends above banks of stained glass sash windows, all trimmed with stone arches and lintels; corner buttresses with stone caps; stone coping at gable parapets; tower with wide eave overhang, shallow hip roof, louvered vents in the upper story and arch above the double door entry."

== See also ==
- National Register of Historic Places listings in Kentucky
