= First Christian Church (Louisville, Kentucky) =

Historic church in Kentucky, United States

- U.S. National Register of Historic Places
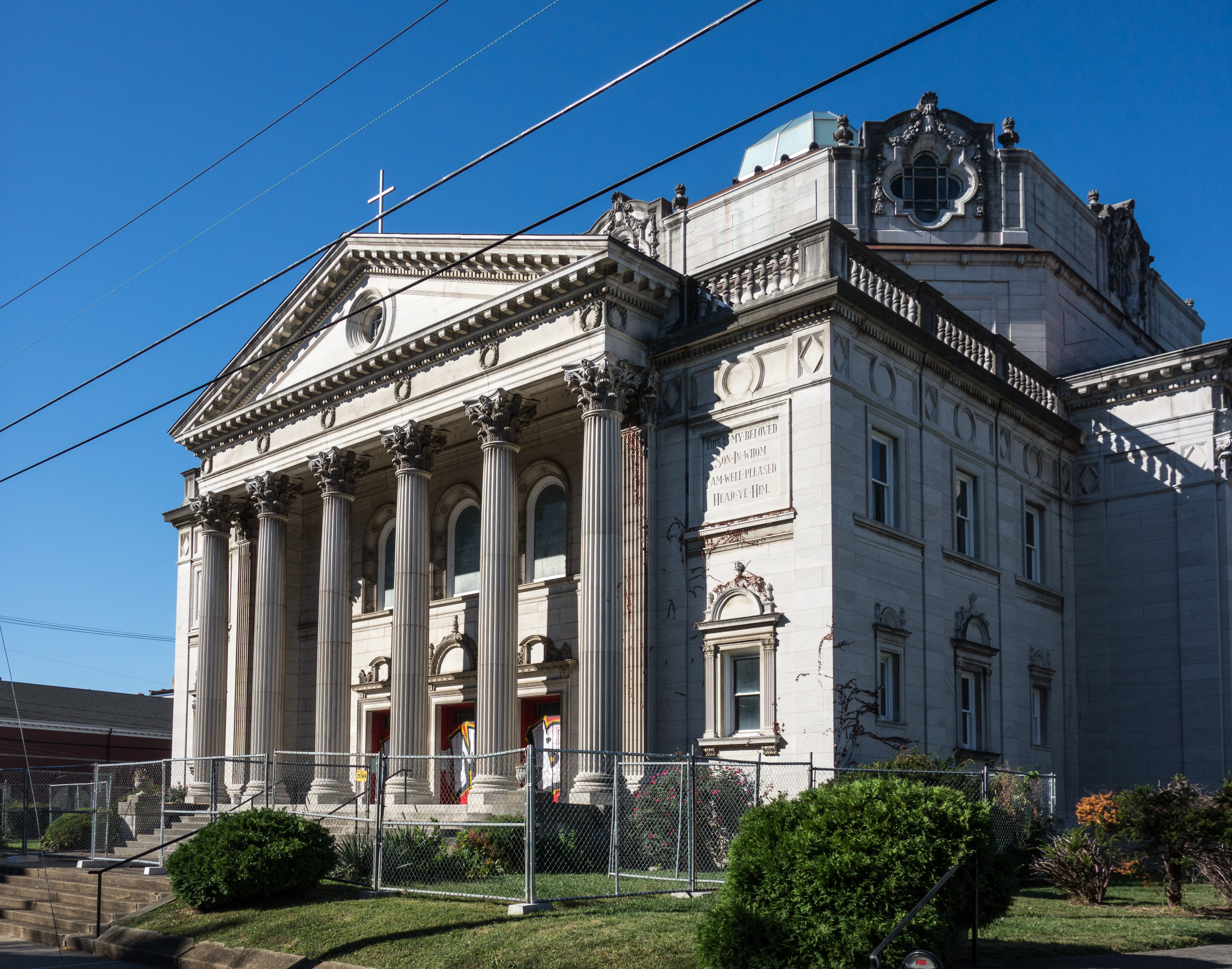

- Location within Kentucky Location within the United States
- Location: 850 S. 4th St., Louisville, Kentucky
- Coordinates: 38°14′32″N 85°45′35″W
- Area: 1.1 acres (0.45 ha)
- Built: 1910
- Architect: McDonald & Dodd
- Architectural style: Beaux Arts
- NRHP reference No.: 79001005
- Added to NRHP: July 16, 1979

First Christian Church (Immanuel Baptist Church) is a historic church building at 850 S. 4th Street in Louisville, Kentucky.

The Beaux Arts building was designed by McDonald & Dodd and built in 1910. It was added to the National Register of Historic Places in 1979.

In 2015, the building was purchased by Immanuel Baptist Church, a Southern Baptist church, and a complete renovation project was begun in May 2016.
