= First Christian Church (Longview, Washington) =

Historic church in Washington, United States

- U.S. National Register of Historic Places
- Location within Washington (state)
- Location: 2000 E. Kessler Blvd., Longview, Washington
- Coordinates: 46°7′53″N 122°56′45″W
- Area: less than one acre
- Built: 1930
- Architect: George MacPherson
- Architectural style: Gothic Revival
- MPS: Civic, Cultural, and Commercial Resources of Longview TR
- NRHP reference No.: 85003015
- Added to NRHP: December 5, 1985

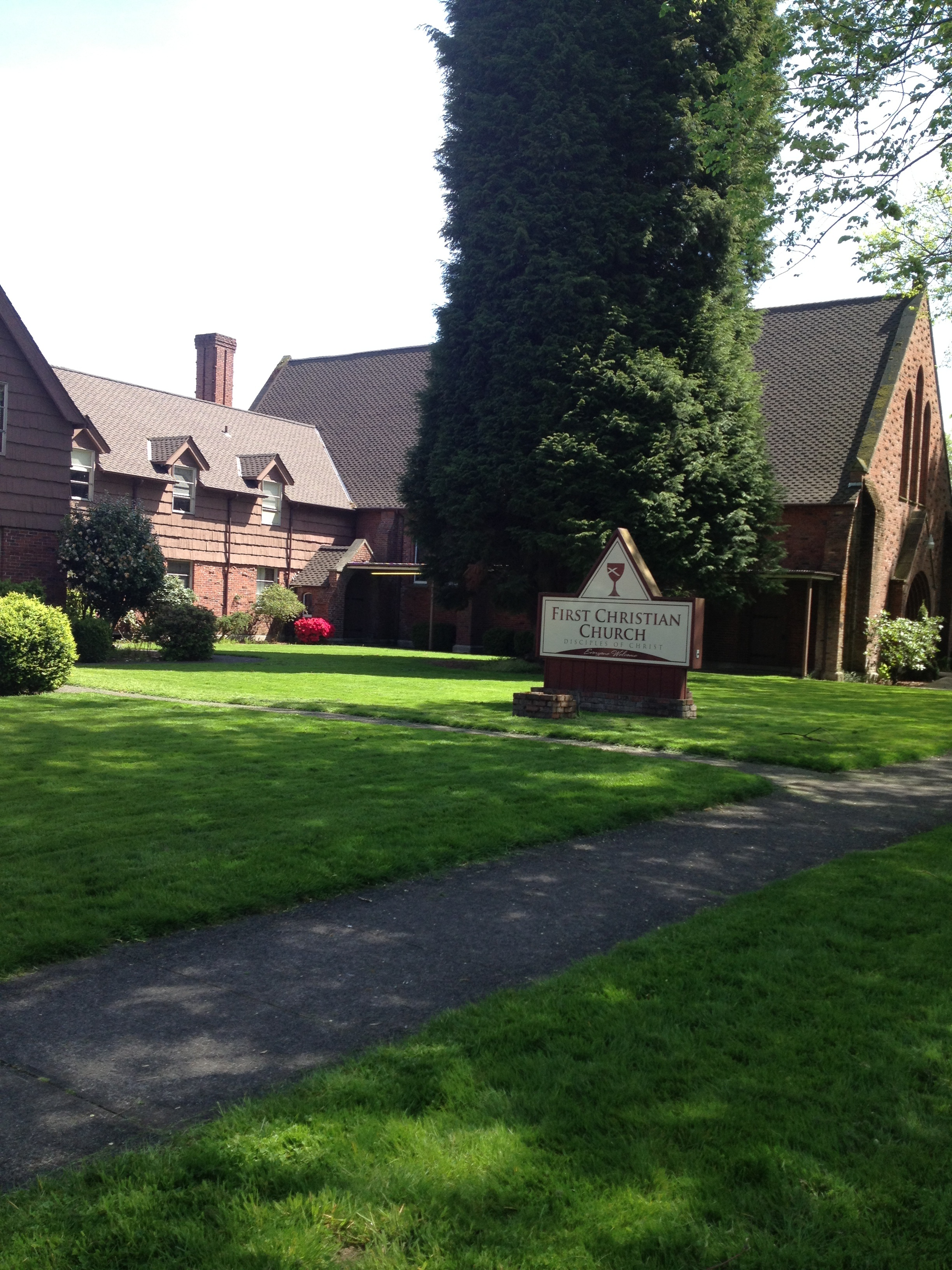
First Christian Church, Longview, Washington

First Christian Church is a historic church at 2000 E. Kessler Boulevard in Longview, Washington.

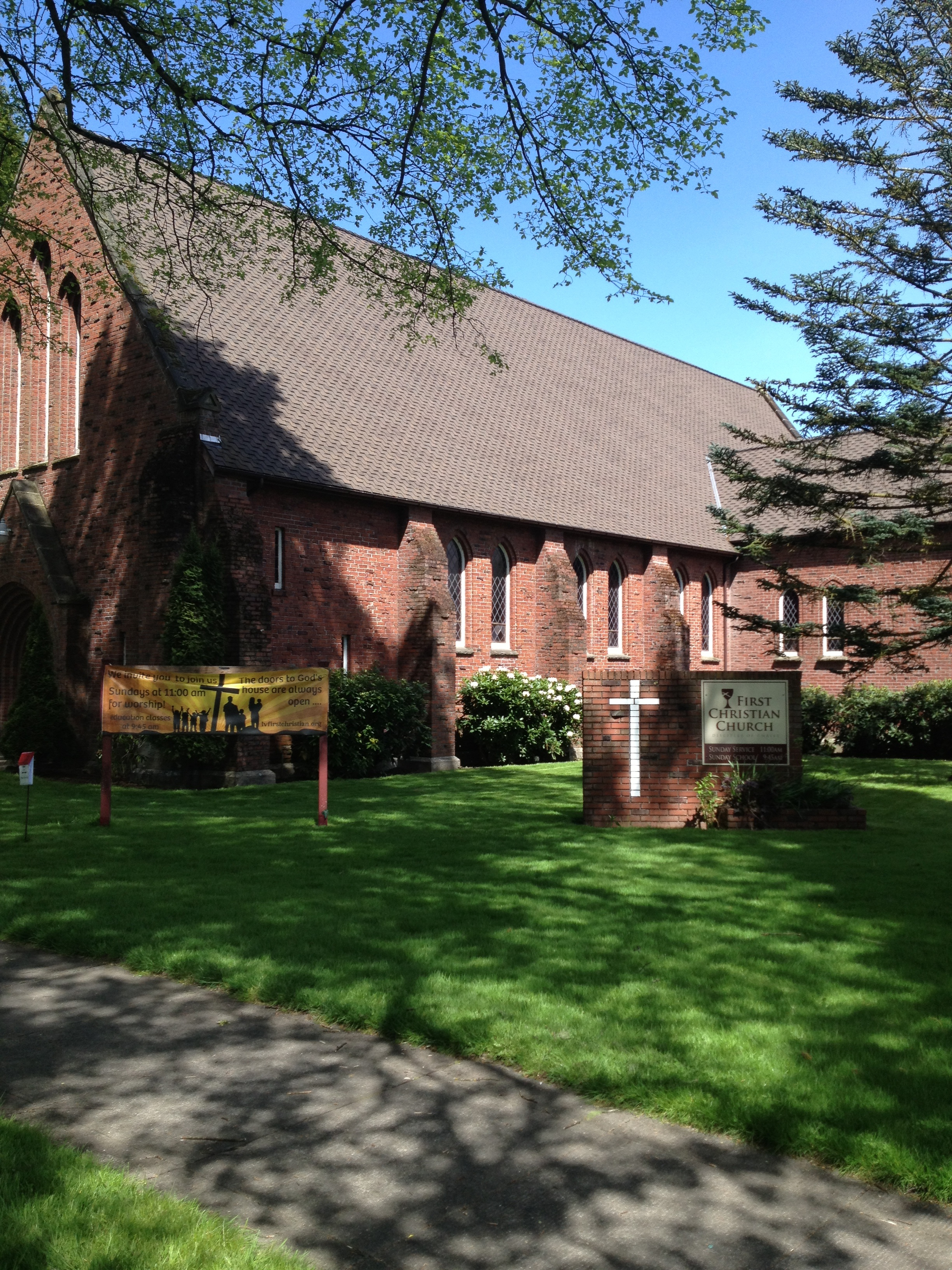
First Christian Church, Longview, Washington.

It was built in 1930 and was added to the National Register in 1985.
