= Christian Church (Disciples of Christ) =

Mainline Protestant (religious) denomination

- The church's logo, depicting a chalice with the Cross of St Andrew.
- Classification: Mainline Restorationist
- Orientation: Mix of Restorationist (Stone-Campbell movement), Liberal, Progressive, and Pluralist/Ecumenicism
- Polity: Congregationalist
- General Minister and President: Teresa Hord Owens
- Associations: Churches Uniting in Christ; Christian Churches Together; Disciples Ecumenical Consultative Council; National Council of Churches; World Council of Churches; World Convention of Churches of Christ
- Full communion: United Church of Christ (1989); United Church of Canada (2019)
- Region: United States and Canada
- Headquarters: Indianapolis, Indiana
- Founder: Barton Stone; Thomas Campbell; Alexander Campbell; Walter Scott
- Origin: 1804: Last Will and Testament; 1809: Declaration and Address; 1832: Union in Lexington; 1849: General Convention; 1917: International Convention; 1968: The Design adopted
- Separated from: Churches of Christ (1906); Christian churches and churches of Christ (1926–1971)
- Congregations: 3,624
- Members: 277,864 (2022)
- Official website: www.disciples.org

The Christian Church (Disciples of Christ) (Note: The full name of the denomination includes the parenthetical phrase.) is a Christian denomination in the United States and Canada. The denomination started with the Restoration Movement during the Second Great Awakening, first existing during the 19th century as a loose association of churches working towards Christian unity, then slowly forming quasi-denominational structures through missionary societies, regional associations, and an international convention. In 1968, the Disciples of Christ officially adopted a denominational structure at which time a group of churches left to remain nondenominational.

The denomination is referred to by several versions of its full name, including "Disciples of Christ", "Disciples", "Christian Church", and "DOC". (Note: The Christian Church (Disciples of Christ) shares similar names with the other streams of the Stone-Campbell Movement. Prior to the 1906 separation of the Churches of Christ, congregations would typically be named "Disciples of Christ," "Christian Church," and "Church of Christ." After the split was recognized in 1906, cooperative Disciples churches began to change their names to the more common Christian Church (Disciples of Christ). By 1968 when the Disciples formally organized themselves as a denomination, another group of churches which had not "cooperated" in common ministries of mission and service beyond the congregation level remained separate and began calling themselves Christian Church, Church of Christ, or Independent Christian Church without the "(Disciples of Christ)" moniker. Disciples churches are most easily recognizable by the use of the red chalice logo, since many do not always use the "(Disciples of Christ)" moniker, preferring only the Christian Church moniker.) The Christian Church was a charter participant in the formation of the World Council of Churches (WCC) and of the Federal Council of Churches (now the National Council of Churches), and it continues to be engaged in ecumenical conversations.

The Disciples' local churches are congregationally governed. In 2008 there were 679,563 members in 3,714 congregations in the United States and Canada. By 2015, this number had declined to a baptized membership of 497,423 in 3,267 congregations, of whom about 306,905 were active members, while approximately 177,000 attended Sunday services each week. In 2018, the denomination reported 380,248 members with 124,437 people in average worship attendance. By 2022, membership had dropped to 277,864 members, 89,894 of whom attended worship on average.

== History ==
The Christian Church (Disciples of Christ) traces its roots to the Stone-Campbell Movement on the American frontier. The Movement is so named because it started as two distinct but similar movements, each without knowledge of the other, during the Second Great Awakening in the early 19th century. The first of these two groups, led by Barton W. Stone, began at Cane Ridge, Bourbon County, Kentucky. The group called themselves simply Christians. The second began in western Pennsylvania and Virginia (now West Virginia), led by Thomas Campbell and his son, Alexander Campbell. Because the founders wanted to abandon all denominational labels, they used the biblical names for the followers of Jesus that they found in the Bible.

=== Stone ===
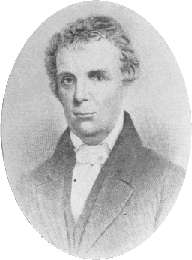
Barton W. Stone

In 1801, the Cane Ridge Revival in Kentucky planted the seed for a movement in Kentucky and the Ohio River Valley to disassociate from denominationalism. In 1803 Stone and others withdrew from the Kentucky Presbytery and formed the Springfield Presbytery. The defining event of the Stone wing of the movement was the publication of the Last Will and Testament of the Springfield Presbytery, at Cane Ridge, Kentucky, in 1804. "The Last Will" is a brief document in which Stone and five others announced their withdrawal from Presbyterianism and their intention to be solely part of the body of Christ. The writers appealed for the unity of all who follow Jesus, suggested the value of congregational self-governance, and lifted the Bible as the source for understanding the will of God. They denounced the use of the Westminster Confession of Faith as divisive.

Soon, they adopted the name "Christian" to identify their group. Thus, the remnants of the Springfield Presbytery became the Christian Church. It is estimated that the Christian Church numbered about 12,000 by 1830.

=== Campbells ===
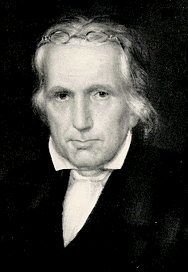
Thomas Campbell

Independently of Stone, Thomas Campbell published the Declaration and Address of the Christian Association of Washington, (Pennsylvania) in 1809. In The Declaration and Address, he set forth some of his convictions about the church of Jesus Christ, emphasizing Christian unity and the restoration of the New Testament church. He organized the Christian Association of Washington, not as a church but as an association of persons seeking to grow in faith. On May 4, 1811, however, the Christian Association constituted itself as a congregationally governed church. With the building it then constructed at Brush Run, it became known as Brush Run Church.

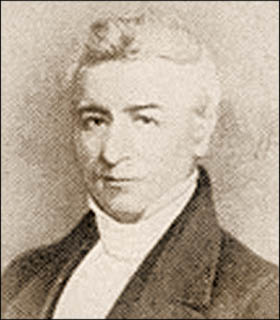
Young Alexander Campbell

When their study of the New Testament led the reformers to begin to practice baptism by immersion, the nearby Redstone Baptist Association invited Brush Run Church to join with them for the purpose of fellowship. The reformers agreed provided that they would be "allowed to preach and to teach whatever they learned from the Scriptures."

Thus began a sojourn for the reformers among the Baptists within the Redstone Baptist Association (1815–1824). While the reformers and the Baptists shared the same beliefs in baptism by immersion and congregational polity, it was soon clear that the reformers were not traditional Baptists. Within the Redstone Association, the differences became intolerable to some of the Baptist leaders, when Alexander Campbell began publishing a journal, The Christian Baptist, promoting reform. Campbell anticipated the conflict and moved his membership to a congregation of the Mahoning Baptist Association in 1824.

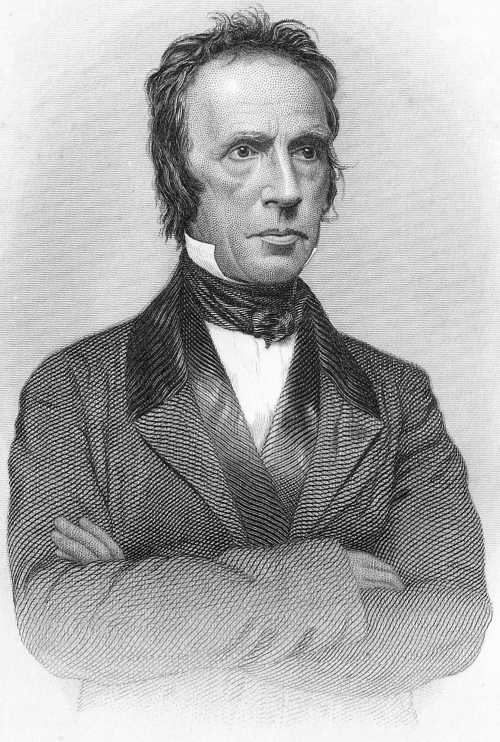
Walter Scott

In 1827, the Mahoning Association appointed reformer Walter Scott as an Evangelist. Through Scott's efforts, the Mahoning Association grew rapidly. In 1828, Thomas Campbell visited several of the congregations formed by Scott and heard him preach. The elder Campbell realized that Scott was bringing an important new dimension to the movement with his approach to evangelism.

Several Baptist associations began disassociating from congregations that refused to subscribe to the Philadelphia Confession. The Mahoning Association came under attack. In 1830, the Mahoning Baptist Association disbanded. Alexander ceased publication of The Christian Baptist. In January 1831, he began publication of the Millennial Harbinger.

=== 1832 Merger ===
"Raccoon" John Smith

The two groups united at High Street Meeting House, Lexington, Kentucky, with a handshake between Barton W. Stone and "Raccoon" John Smith, on Saturday, December 31, 1831. Smith had been chosen by those present to speak on behalf of the followers of the Campbells. While contemporaneous accounts are clear that the handshake took place on Saturday, some historians have changed the date of the merger to Sunday, January 1, 1832. The 1832 date has become generally accepted. The actual difference is about 20 hours.

Two representatives of those assembled were appointed to carry the news of the union to all the churches: John Rogers for the Christians and "Raccoon" John Smith for the reformers. Despite some challenges, the merger succeeded.

With the merger, there was the challenge of what to call the new movement. Clearly, finding a Biblical, non-sectarian name was important. Stone wanted to continue to use the name "Christians." Alexander Campbell insisted upon "Disciples of Christ". Walter Scott and Thomas Campbell sided with Stone, but the younger Campbell had strong reasons and would not yield. As a result, both names were used.

=== National Conventions ===
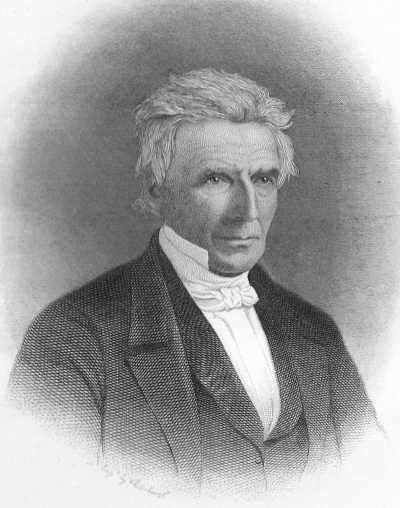
Alexander Campbell, age 65

In 1849, the first National Convention was held at Cincinnati, Ohio. Alexander Campbell had concerns that holding conventions would lead the movement into divisive denominationalism. He did not attend the gathering. Among its actions, the convention elected Alexander Campbell its President and created the American Christian Missionary Society (ACMS).

The formation of a missionary society set the stage for further "co-operative" efforts. By the end of the century, the Foreign Christian Missionary Society and the Christian Women's Board of Missions were also engaged in missionary activities. Forming the ACMS did not reflect a consensus of the entire movement. Sponsorship of missionary activities became a divisive issue. In the succeeding decades, for some congregations and their leaders, co-operative work through missionary societies and the adoption of instrumental music in church worship was straying too far from their conception of the early church. After the American Civil War, the schism grew. While there was no disagreement over the need for evangelism, many believed that missionary societies were not authorized by scripture and would compromise the autonomy of local congregations. This became one important factor leading to the separation of the Churches of Christ from the Christian Church (Disciples of Christ).

=== Journals ===
From the beginning of the movement, the free exchange of ideas among the people was fostered by the journals published by its leaders. Alexander Campbell published the Christian Baptist and the Millennial Harbinger. Barton W. Stone published the Christian Messenger. In a respectful way, both men routinely published the contributions of others whose positions were radically different from their own.

Following Campbell's death in 1866, journals continued to keep the discussion and conversation alive. Between 1870 and 1900, two journals emerged as the most prominent. The Christian Standard was edited and published by Isaac Errett of Cincinnati. The Christian Evangelist was edited and published by J. H. Garrison from St. Louis. The two men enjoyed a friendly rivalry, and kept the dialog going within the movement. A third journal became part of the conversation with the publication in 1884 of The Christian Oracle, later to become The Christian Century, with an interdenominational appeal. In 1914, Garrison's Christian Publishing company was purchased by R. A. Long, who then established a non-profit corporation, "The Christian Board of Publication" as the Brotherhood publishing house.

=== First Division ===
In 1906, the U.S. Religious Census listed Churches of Christ for the first time as a group which was separate and distinct from the Disciples of Christ. However, the division had been growing for years, with published reports as early as 1883. The most obvious distinction between the two groups was the Churches of Christ rejecting the use of musical instruments in worship. The controversy over musical instruments began in 1860, when some congregations introduced organs, traditionally associated with wealthier, denominational churches. More basic were the underlying approaches to Biblical interpretation. The Churches of Christ permitted only those practices found in accounts of New Testament worship. They could find no New Testament documentation of the use of instrumental music in worship. The Disciples, by contrast, considered permissible any practices that the New Testament did not expressly forbid. While music and the approach to missionary work were the most visible issues, there were also some deeper ones. The process that led to the separation had begun prior to the American Civil War.

=== The Brotherhood ===
In the early 20th century, a central point of conflict for the remaining Christian Churches was cooperative missionary efforts, both nationally and internationally. Several missionary societies had already been established, and the congregations that contributed to these societies and attended the national convention became known as "cooperative" and began referring to the larger grouping of these congregations as "the Brotherhood." In 1917 the National Convention became the International Convention of Christian Churches (Disciples of Christ) with the incorporation of Canadian Disciples. In 1920, three separate missionary societies merged into the United Christian Missionary Society in 1920, which undertook missions work both in the "homeland" and abroad. Over the next fifty years, the UCMS was the largest agency of the Brotherhood. The National Benevolent Association was also established during the early 20th century as a social services ministry providing assistance to orphans, the elderly and the disabled.

The congregations that did not participate were known as "independents." Until the cooperative churches underwent the process of restructure in the 1960s, the cooperatives and independents coexisted together under the same identity, but were following different paths by the 1940s, with the independents forming the North American Christian Convention in 1947.

While issues of ecclesiology were at the forefront of the growing division, theological issues also divided the two groups, with the cooperative churches largely adopting the new methods of Biblical analysis developed in the late 19th century.

=== Restructure ===
Following World War II, it became obvious that the organizations that had been developed in previous decades no longer effectively met the needs of the postwar era. After a number of discussions throughout the 1950s, the 1960 International Convention of Christian Churches adopted a process to "restructure" the entire organization. The Commission on Restructure, chaired by Granville T. Walker, held its first meeting on October 30 & November 1, 1962. In 1968, the International Convention of Christian Churches (Disciples of Christ) adopted the commission's proposed Provisional Design of the Christian Church (Disciples of Christ). Soon The Provisional Design became The Design.

The Brotherhood's adoption of The Design made the earlier split between the cooperative and independent churches official. Under The Design, all churches in the 1968 yearbook of Christian Churches (Disciples of Christ) were automatically recognized as part of the Christian Church (Disciples of Christ). In the years that followed, many of the Independent Christian Church Congregations requested formal withdrawal from the yearbook. Many of those congregations were already part of the North American Christian Convention; this group would become known as the Christian churches and churches of Christ and became the third primary group of the Stone-Campbell Movement.

==== Logo ====
In 1971, the General Assembly adopted a logo for the denomination. The logo depicts a red chalice with a white St. Andrew's Cross. Symbolically the chalice is said to represent the Lord's Supper, which is central to Disciples practice, and the cross of St. Andrew is said to represent the denomination's roots in Scottish Presbyterian and the ministry of all people. The logo was designed by Ronald E. Osborn who drew the logo with a red pen, leading to the red color of the logo, and refined by Bruce Tilsley. The logo can be used by all Disciples congregations, ministries, and other affiliated institutions and provides clarity among confusion from the "Christian Church" moniker many Disciple and non-Disciple congregations use.

== Beliefs and practices ==
As a congregational denomination, each Disciples congregation determines the nature of its worship, study, Christian service, and witness to the world. Through belief in the priesthood of all believers, Disciples also practice freedom of interpretation among its members, with only baptism and confession of Christ as Lord required.

=== Doctrine and interpretation ===
Preamble

As members of the Christian Church,
We confess that Jesus is the Christ,
the Son of the living God,
and proclaim him Lord and Savior of the world.
In Christ's name and by his grace
we accept our mission of witness
and service to all people.
We rejoice in God,
maker of heaven and earth,
and in God's covenant of love
which binds us to God and to one another.
Through baptism into Christ
we enter into newness of life
and are made one with the whole people of God.
In the communion of the Holy Spirit
we are joined together in discipleship
and in obedience to Christ.
At the Table of the Lord
we celebrate with thanksgiving
the saving acts and presence of Christ.
Within the universal church
we receive the gift of ministry
and the light of scripture.
In the bonds of Christian faith
we yield ourselves to God
that we may serve the One
whose kingdom has no end.
Blessing, glory, and honor
be to God forever. Amen.

— The Design of the Christian Church (Disciples of Christ)

Early members of the Stone-Campbell Movement adopted the slogan "In essentials, Unity; In non-essentials, Liberty; and in all things, Charity." (Note: From Marco Antonio de Dominis, De Repubblica Ecclesiastica) For modern disciples the one essential is the acceptance of Jesus Christ as Lord and Savior, and obedience to him in baptism. There is no requirement to give assent to any other statement of belief or creed. Nor is there any official interpretation of the Bible. Hierarchical doctrine was traditionally rejected by Disciples as human-made and divisive, and subsequently, freedom of belief and scriptural interpretation allows many Disciples to question or even deny beliefs common in doctrinal churches such as the Incarnation, the Trinity, and the Atonement. Beyond the essential commitment to follow Jesus, there is a tremendous freedom of belief and interpretation. As the basic teachings of Jesus are studied and applied to life, there is the freedom to interpret Jesus' teaching in different ways. As would be expected from such an approach, there is a wide diversity among Disciples in what individuals and congregations believe. It is not uncommon to find individuals who seemingly hold diametrically opposed beliefs within the same congregation affirming one another's journeys of faith as sisters and brothers in Christ.

Modern Disciples reject the use of creeds as "tests of faith", that is, as required beliefs, necessary to be accepted as a follower of Jesus. Although Disciples respect the great creeds of the church as informative affirmations of faith, they are never seen as binding. Since the adoption of The Design of the Christian Church (Disciples of Christ), in 1968, Disciples have celebrated a sense of unity in reading the preamble to the Design publicly.

=== Worship and Communion ===
Most congregations sing hymns, read from the Old and New Testaments, hear the word of God proclaimed through sermon or other medium and extend an invitation to become Christ's Disciples.

Most Disciple congregations practice weekly celebrations of the Lord's Supper, often referred to by Disciples as Communion, as an integral part of worship. Through the observance of Communion, individuals are invited to acknowledge their faults and sins, to remember the death and resurrection of Jesus Christ, to remember their baptism, and to give thanks for God's redeeming love. Because Disciples believe that the invitation to the table comes from Jesus Christ, Communion is open to all who confess that Jesus Christ is Lord, regardless of their denominational affiliation.

=== Baptism ===
Most Disciple congregations practice believer's baptism in the form of immersion, believing it to be the form used in the New Testament. The experiences of yielding to Christ in being buried with him in the waters of baptism and rising to a new life have profound meaning for the church. While most congregations exclusively practice baptism by immersion, Disciples also accept other forms of baptism including infant baptism.

=== Ecumenical efforts ===
"The church of Christ upon earth is essentially, intentionally,
and constitutionally one; consisting of all those in every place
that profess their faith in Christ and obedience to him in all things."

— Thomas Campbell — Proposition 1 of the Declaration and Address

The Disciples celebrate their oneness with all who seek God through Jesus Christ, throughout time and regardless of location. In local communities, congregations share with churches of other denominations in joint worship and in community Christian service. Ecumenical cooperation and collaboration with other Christian Communions has long been practiced by the Regions.

At the General Church level, the Christian Unity and Interfaith Ministries Unity (CUIM) coordinates the ecumenical and interfaith activities of the church. The Disciples continues to relate to the National Council of Churches and Canadian Council of Churches, both of which it was a founding member. It shares in the dialog and in the theological endeavors of the World Council of Churches. The Disciples has been a full participant in the Consultation on Church Union since it began in the 1960s. It continues to support those ongoing conversations which have taken on the title Churches Uniting in Christ.

The Disciples have two full communion partners: the United Church of Christ, since 1989, and the United Church of Canada, since 2019. These three denominations all share mutual full communion with each other. CUIM describes these partnerships as the proclamation of "mutual recognition of their sacraments and ordained ministry." Ordained Disciple ministers are able to directly serve in the United Church of Christ without having to seek additional qualifications.

Additionally, the Disciples combined their overseas ministries with the United Church of Christ in 1996. Known as Global Ministries, it is a common agency of both denominations with a joint staff and is a continuance of decades of cooperative work in global missions.

While the Disciples of Christ and United Church of Canada have entered full communion, the recentness of the agreement means that the provisions for mutual recognition of clergy are not yet finalized and adopted.

=== Ordained ministry ===
The Disciples believe in the priesthood of all believers, in that all people baptized are called to minister to others with diverse spiritual gifts. The Disciples view their Order of Ministry as a specific subset of all believers who are called with spiritual gifts specifically suited for pastoral ministry. Congregations use different terms to refer to persons in the Order of Ministry including Pastor and Reverend but most call them Ministers, including the denomination's governing documents.

Congregations sponsor members seeking ordination or commissioning as a Minister, and Regional Ministries organize committees to oversee the process. Ordination can be achieved by obtaining a Master of Divinity from a theological institution, which does not have to be an institution associated with the Disciples. Ordination can also be achieved through an "Apprentice" track which has candidates shadow ordained ministers. Finally, Ministers can be Commissioned, a shorter process for seminary students and those seeking short-term ministry in a Region. Regional requirements for ministry vary. Ordination is made official through a service which includes members of the church, clergy, and Regional Minister laying their hands on the candidate as the ordaining act. Ecumenical representatives are often included to emphasize the Disciples' desire for Christian unity.

Disciples recognize the ordinations of the United Church of Christ as do they for Disciples.

A General Commission on the Order of Ministry exists to interpret and review definitions of ministry, give oversight to Regions and congregations, provide other support, and maintain the standing of Regional Ministers and Ministers of General (National) Ministries.

=== LGBTQ inclusion ===
In 1977, the General Assembly of the denomination debated resolutions about homosexuality for the first time; a resolution condemning the "homosexual lifestyle" was defeated by the Assembly and a resolution to ban gay people from the ordained ministry was referred to the General Minister and President for further study. At the next General Assembly two years later, the Assembly approved a resolution that declared "The ordination of persons who engage in homosexual practices is not in accord with God's will," but concurrently declared that "The Christian Church (Disciples of Christ) intends to continue the current pattern of assigning responsibility to the regions with respect to the nurture, certification, and ordination of ministers." Since then, some regions have ordained LGBTQ ministers before the denomination officially supported it. Concerns about LGBTQ people continued to be an issue at the General Assembly, but resolutions that called on more civil rights protections for LGBTQ people were passed with overwhelming majorities and resolutions to ban the "homosexual lifestyle" continued to be rejected.

In 1979, progressive churches founded the GLAD: the Gay, Lesbian, and Affirming Disciples (renamed Alliance Q in 2017) network for the inclusion of LGBTQ people.

In 2019, the General Assembly passed a resolution specifically affirming that transgender and gender non-conforming people are welcome in the Christian Church (Disciples of Christ).

=== Marriage ===
In 2011, the Christian Church (Disciples of Christ) stated that "Disciples do not have a formal policy on same-sex marriage. Different congregations have the autonomy to discern on issues such as this one." In 2013, the Disciples of Christ voted in favor of a resolution affirming all members regardless of sexual orientation. After same-sex marriage was legalized in the US, the denomination reiterated that it leaves "all decisions of policy on same-sex marriage to local congregations".

=== Abortion ===
Some members of the Disciples of Christ support the right to an abortion, but this is far from true for all Disciples.

== Structure ==
The structure of the Disciples is unique among Mainline Protestant churches. The Design, the governing document of the denomination, describes three "expressions" of the church: congregational, regional, and general. Each of these expressions are "characterized by its integrity, self-governance, authority, rights, and responsibilities." In relating to each other, they work in covenant and not authority to support the ministry and work of the church.

=== Congregations ===
Congregations of the Disciples are self-governing in the tradition of congregational polity. They call their own Ministers, select their own leadership, own their own property, and manage their own affairs.

In Disciples congregations, the priesthood of all believers finds its expression in worship and Christian service. Congregations elect and ordain lay persons as Elders to share in duties of congregational ministry with the staff ministers, including visiting the sick and administering communion to them, providing spiritual guidance for the congregation, and presiding over Communion during worship, either with or without the staff ministers.

=== Regional Ministries ===
Regional churches consist of all Disciples in a given area, usually a state or group of states. As of 2023, the denomination has 31 regions, including the Christian Church (Disciples of Christ) in Canada which has a dual identity as a region in the binational church and a national denomination in its own right.

Regions meet in a Regional Assembly every two to three years to conduct business. Each Region calls a Regional Minister to serve as its primary pastor and chief executive; most regions also have Associate Regional Ministers and other staff to serve specific aspects of its ministries. Canada calls its regional minister a "national pastor". Regions are analogous to the middle judicatories of other denominations, and Regional Ministers are analogous to Bishops.

One of the primary responsibilities of the Regions is the care for and oversight of clergy. The Design places primary responsibility for ordination and licensing of ministers with the region. Candidates seeking ordination are sponsored by a congregation but must be approved by their region, which usually entails a process of interviews and other evaluations by a committee made up of clergy and lay people. The Regional Minister usually officiates the ordination service in the sponsoring congregation. After ordination, regions continue to oversee clergy through a process known as standing, which requires ministers to undergo certain trainings periodically and maintain membership in a Disciples congregation. Ministers can lose their standing for violating the ministerial code of ethics the denomination maintains. Finally, Regional Ministers often provide pastoral care to ministers in their region.

Regions also nurture congregations in their region, including planting new churches, providing guidance, supporting struggling congregations, and helping congregations hire their ministers. This latter process consists of a system known as Search and Call, in which ministers seeking a church declare which regions they would like to serve in and the region then suggests those candidates to congregations seeking a minister. Regional Ministers usually provides congregations with a set of candidates that they feel will meet the congregation's particular needs.

Regions also provide fellowship and education opportunities for its members. Many regions have summer camping experiences for children and youth.

As with all parts of the Disciples, Regions do not have authority to control congregations and congregations are not required to use regional programming, including the search and call system.

=== General Ministries ===
The Christian Church (Disciples of Christ) at the "General Church" level consists of a number of self-governing agencies, which focus upon specific Christian witnesses to the world. The church agencies report to the General Assembly, which meets biennially in odd-numbered years and is an assembly of representatives selected by congregations and ordained ministers with standing in the denomination. The General Minister and President (GMP) is the lead pastor for the denomination and the chief executive officer of the legal corporation. Following the covenantal understanding of the denomination, the GMP does not have direct executive power over the General Ministries, regions, or congregations. The GMP is elected to a six-year term by the General Assembly, with the option for a second term.

The current General Minister and President is Teresa Hord Owens. When she was elected in 2017, Owens was the first black woman to lead a mainline denomination as their chief executive. Her presidency followed the presidency of Sharon E. Watkins, the first woman to lead a mainline denomination as their chief executive.

The General Ministries are:

- Office of the General Minister and President: executive office for the denomination and includes communications, fundraising for the denominational mission fund, Week of Compassion, and anti-racist/pro-reconciliation efforts
- Central Pastoral Office for Hispanic Ministries-Obra Hispana: promotes, undergirds, and coordinates work of Disciples Hispanic Ministries and Spanish speaking and bilingual congregations
- Christian Board of Publication-Chalice Press: denominational publishing house
- Christian Church Foundation: provides assistance on giving and endowments
- Christian Unity and Interfaith Ministry (formerly the Council on Christian Unity): ecumenical and interfaith engagement and dialogue
- Disciples Church Extension Fund: support for congregational finances, new church ministry, and congregational renewal
- Disciples Home Missions: provides support for congregational and local ministries including education and faith formation, church vocations, environmental justice, immigration and refugee ministries, families and children, youth, young adults, men's and women's ministries, and volunteering.
- Disciples of Christ Historical Society: maintains archives for the denomination and the larger Stone-Campbell Movement
- Division of Overseas Ministries-Global Ministries: global mission and volunteer work in joint partnership with the United Church of Christ
- Higher Education and Leadership Ministries: works with higher education partners and theological education partners and provides leadership development
- National Benevolent Association: partners with and connects independent health and social service ministries to Disciples and each other
- National Convocation: historical association of Black Disciple congregations that merged with the White Disciples in 1968, now continues as an association connecting and supporting black members and congregations
- North American Pacific/Asian Disciples: association of Pacific and Asian-American Disciples members and congregations
- Pension Fund of the Christian Church: provides pensions and investment/savings products to clergy and lay employees of Stone-Campbell/Restoration Movement churches and organizations.

One General Agency program is the "Week of Compassion," named for the special offering to fund the program when it began in the 1950s. The Week of Compassion is the disaster relief and Third World development agency. It works closely with Church World Service and church-related organizations in countries around the world where disasters strike, providing emergency aid.

The General Church has challenged the entire denomination to work for a 2020 Vision for the first two decades of the 21st Century. Together the denomination is well on the way to achieving its four foci:

- Seeking racial justice, which it describes as becoming a pro-reconciling/anti-racist church.
- Forming 1,000 new congregations across the United States and Canada by 2020.
- Seeking God's transformation of 1,000 existing Congregations in ways that will renew their witness.
- Working to nurture leadership for newly formed and transformed congregations.

== Membership trends ==
The Christian Church (Disciples of Christ) has experienced a very significant loss of membership since the middle of the 20th century. Membership peaked in 1958 at just under 2 million. In 1993, membership dropped below 1 million. In 2009, the denomination reported 658,869 members in 3,691 congregations. In 2010, the five states with the highest adherence rates were Kansas, Missouri, Iowa, Kentucky and Oklahoma. The states with the largest absolute number of adherents were Missouri, Texas, Indiana, Kentucky and Ohio. In 2017, membership had declined to 450,425 members.

== Affiliated academic institutions ==
From the very beginnings of the movement, Disciples have founded institutions of higher learning. Alexander Campbell taught young leaders and founded Bethany College. The movement established similar schools, especially in the years following the American Civil War.

Because intellectual and religious freedom are important values for the Disciples of Christ, the colleges, universities, and seminaries founded by its congregations do not seek to indoctrinate students or faculty with a sectarian point of view.

In the 21st century, the relationship between the Christian Church (Disciples of Christ) and its affiliated universities is the purview of Higher Education and Leadership Ministries (HELM), an agency of the General Church.

=== Universities and colleges ===
- Barton College – Wilson, North Carolina
- Bethany College – Bethany, West Virginia
- Chapman University – Orange, California
- Columbia College – Columbia, Missouri
- Culver-Stockton College – Canton, Missouri
- Drury University – Springfield, Missouri
- Eureka College – Eureka, Illinois
- Hiram College – Hiram, Ohio
- Jarvis Christian College – Hawkins, Texas
- University of Lynchburg – Lynchburg, Virginia
- Midway University – Midway, Kentucky
- Texas Christian University – Fort Worth, Texas
- Tougaloo College – Tougaloo, Mississippi
- Transylvania University – Lexington, Kentucky
- William Woods University – Fulton, Missouri

=== Seminaries and theological institutions ===
The Disciples have four seminaries and divinity schools directly affiliated with the denomination. These institutions have an ecumenical student body, a reflection of the Disciples' focus on church unity. They are:

- Brite Divinity School – Fort Worth, Texas
- Christian Theological Seminary – Indianapolis, Indiana
- Lexington Theological Seminary – Lexington, Kentucky
- Phillips Theological Seminary – Tulsa, Oklahoma

The Disciples have three additional institutions that provide supplementary education and community living for ecumenical theological institutions. They are:

- Disciples Divinity House of the University of Chicago, affiliated with the University of Chicago Divinity School – Chicago, Illinois
- Disciples Divinity House at Vanderbilt, affiliated with the Vanderbilt Divinity School – Nashville, Tennessee
- Disciples Seminary Foundation, affiliated with Claremont School of Theology, Iliff School of Theology, Pacific School of Religion, and San Francisco Theological Seminary – Claremont, California

== Ecumenical relations ==
The Disciples of Christ maintains ecumenical relations with the Pontifical Council for Promoting Christian Unity. It is also affiliated with other ecumenical organizations such as Churches Uniting in Christ, Christian Churches Together, the National Council of Churches and the World Council of Churches. It maintains Ordained Ministerial Partner Standing with the United Church of Christ, which means that clergy ordained in the Disciples of Christ may also serve in the United Church of Christ. Since 2019, it has been a full Communion partner and had an agreement for mutual recognition of ministerial credentials with the United Church of Canada. It is affiliated with the Disciples Ecumenical Consultative Council and the World Communion of Reformed Churches.

== Prominent members ==
- Jesse Moren Bader, evangelist
- William Barber II, Disciples pastor and President of North Carolina NAACP
- Andy Beshear, current Governor of Kentucky
- Edgar Cayce, American mystic
- Fred Craddock, professor and preacher
- Elmira J. Dickinson, American missionary and advocate for temperance
- J. William Fulbright, U.S. Senator from Arkansas
- James A. Garfield, 20th President of the United States, ordained Disciples minister, Principal (President) of Western Reserve Eclectic Institute (now named Hiram College) in Hiram, Ohio
- Murry Hammond, singer
- Grey DeLisle, voice actress
- Dean Hess, US Air Force Pilot
- Ben Hogan, professional golfer, tied for fourth all-time with nine career professional major championships
- Archie Ijames, assistant pastor of Jim Jones' Peoples Temple.
- Lyndon Baines Johnson, 36th President of the United States
- Jim Jones, cult leader, who was ordained as a Disciples minister before the denomination was organized in 1968; at that time requirements for ordination varied greatly in different regions and congregations. Two investigations were undertaken in 1974 and 1977 by the denomination that did not find any wrongdoings. No rules or precedent existed for the Disciples for removing ministers, and the Disciples responded to the Jonestown mass killings with significant changes for ministerial ethics and the process to remove ministers from the list of ordained.
- Marinda Lemert (1811–1891), religious writer who argued for the ordination of women
- Frances McDormand, actress; winner of the Triple Crown of Acting
- James Clark McReynolds, United States Supreme Court Justice (1914–1941)
- Harold Bell Wright, early 20th century author; pastor at churches in the association prior to becoming an author. The author is best known for the novel The Shepherd of the Hills, and is the first fiction author to sell 1 million copies.
- John Muir, Scottish founder of the environmental movement. Raised in the church, but later left it.
- Francis Gary Powers, American CIA U-2 spy plane pilot shot down while flying a reconnaissance mission in Soviet Union airspace
- Betsy Price, former mayor of Fort Worth, Texas (2011–2021), the 16th most populous city in the United States
- Ronald Reagan, 40th President of the United States, baptized into the Disciples as a youth, and graduated from the Disciples' Eureka College, but a member of Bel Air Presbyterian Church in his later years. He married Nancy at The Little Brown Church in Studio City, California, a Disciples Church.
- Susanna Carson Rijnhart, Tibetan explorer, missionary
- Gene Robinson, raised in a Disciples church, later joined the Episcopal Church in the United States of America and became the first openly gay priest to be consecrated as a bishop in a major Christian denomination believing in the historic episcopate
- Colonel Harlan Sanders, founder of Kentucky Fried Chicken
- Tom Selleck, actor
- John Stamos, actor
- Preston Taylor, African American minister, businessperson and philanthropist; founder of the National Christian Missionary Convention
- William Thomas Jr., actor
- Marion Tinsley, considered the all-time greatest human checkers player
- Jessie Trout, Canadian missionary in Japan, author, Japanese-American internment camp worker, co-founder of the Christian Women's Fellowship (1950) and the International Christian Women's Fellowship (1953)
- Emily Harvie Thomas Tubman, businesswoman and philanthropist from Augusta, Georgia, early supporter of the Restoration Movement and correspondent of Alexander Campbell. She financed the construction of many Christian churches in the United States and donated to several Disciples-affiliated colleges.
- Roger Williams (U.S. politician), Congressman representing Texas' 25th District in the U.S. House of Representatives. Former Secretary of State of Texas (2004–2007)
- John Wooden, legendary UCLA basketball coach, raised in a Disciples Church in Martinsville, Indiana

== See also ==
- First Christian Church, a typical name for many Disciples congregations, links to a disambiguation page with a list of congregations
- National City Christian Church, the Disciples' main congregation in Washington, D.C.
- DisciplesWorld, now-defunct magazine that covered the denomination
- Restoration Movement
- Churches of Christ, separated officially in 1906
- Christian churches and churches of Christ, separated officially in 1968
- World Convention of Churches of Christ

== Sources ==
- Boring, M. Eugene (1997). Disciples And The Bible. Chalice Press. ISBN 0-8272-0623-2.
- Campbell, Thomas (1809). The Declaration and Address
- Cartwright, Colbert S. (1987). People of the Chalice, Disciples of Christ in Faith and Practice. St Louis, MO: Chalice Press. ISBN 0-8272-2938-0.
- Challen, James (editor), Biographical Sketch of Alexander Campbell, Ladies' Christian Annual, March, 1857 (Volume VI, No. 3), Philadelphia: James Challen, Publisher. Pages 81–90.Online Edition
- Corey, Stephen (1953). Fifty Years of Attack and Controversy St. Louis, MO: Committee on the publication of the Corey manuscript
- Cummins, Duane D. (1991). A handbook for Today's Disciples in the Christian Church (Disciples of Christ) Revised Edition. St Louis, MO: Chalice Press. ISBN 0-8272-1425-1.
- Davis, M. M. (1915). How the Disciples Began and Grew, A Short History of the Christian Church, Cincinnati: The Standard Publishing Company
- Garrison, Winfred Earnest and DeGroot, Alfred T. (1948). The Disciples of Christ, A History, St Louis, Missouri: The Bethany Press
- Green, F. M. (1904). "James A. Garfield". John T. Brown's Churches of Christ. Memorial University of Newfoundland. Archived from the original on December 15, 2005.
- "The Design of the Christian Church (Disciples of Christ)" (PDF). Christian Church (Disciples of Christ). July 2005. Archived from the original (PDF) on April 14, 2008.
- Marshall, Robert; Dunlavy, John; M'Nemar, Richard; Stone, B. W.; Thompson, John; and Purviance, David (1804). The Last Will and Testament of the Springfield Presbytery
- McAlister, Lester G. and Tucker, William E. (1975), Journey in Faith: A History of the Christian Church (Disciples of Christ) - St. Louis, Chalice Press, ISBN 978-0-8272-1703-4
- "Religion and President Johnson". Lyndon B. Johnson Library and Museum. Archived from the original on November 21, 2013.
- "Ronald Reagan Facts". Ronald Reagan Presidential Library. Archived from the original on October 16, 2014.
- Watkins, Sharon E. (publisher) (2006). Yearbook & Directory of the Christian Church (Disciples of Christ) - 2006, Indianapolis: The Office of The General Minister and President
- Williams, D. Newell (2008). The Christian Church (Disciples of Christ): A Reformed North American Mainstream Moderate Denomination, presentation given during the Christian Church (Disciples of Christ) Consultation on "Becoming a Multicultural and Inclusive Church," March 27, 2008. Retrieved January 4, 2010.
