= Leo Ryan =

American politician and teacher (1925–1978)

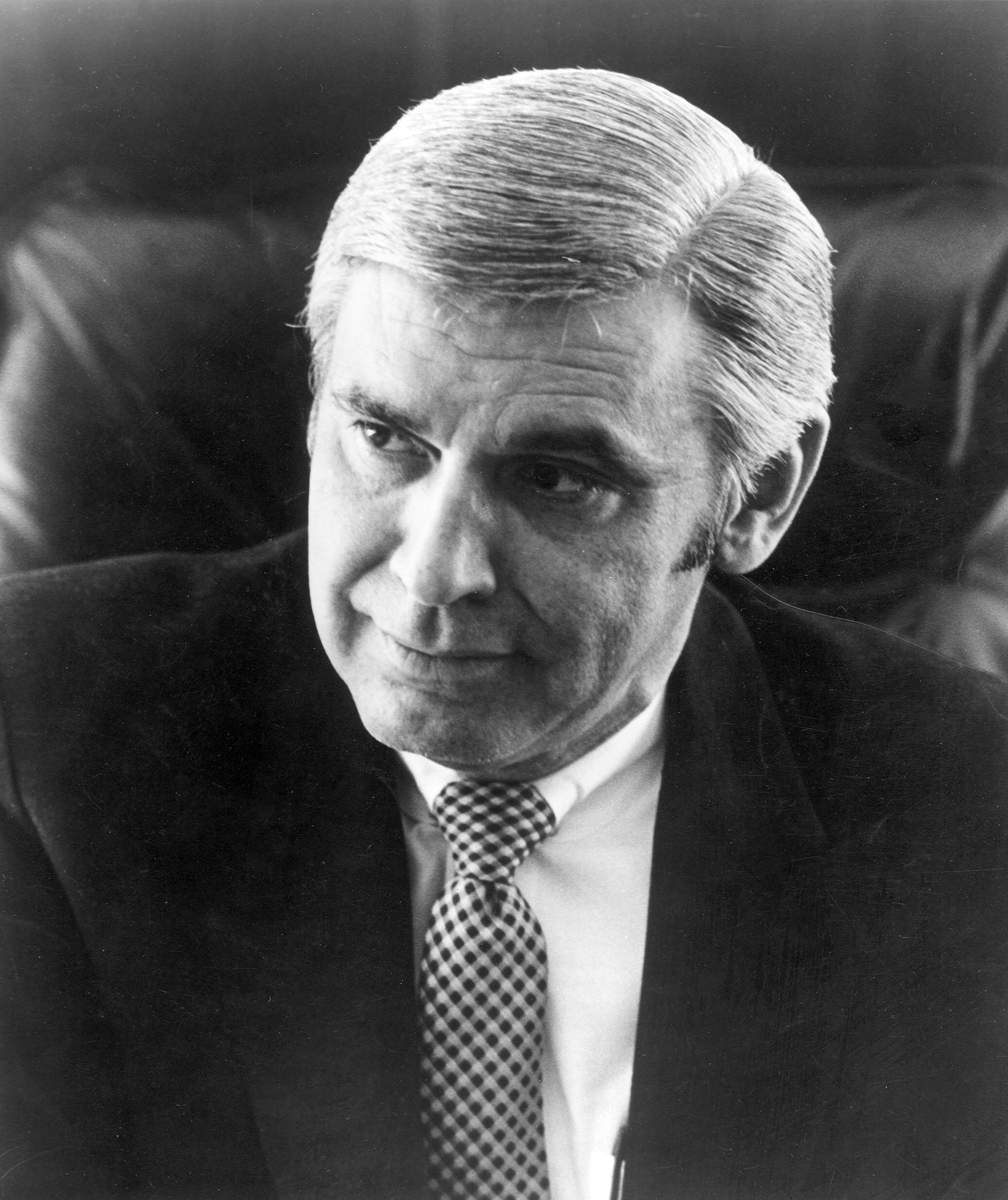
- Ryan in 1977

Member of the U.S. House of Representatives from California's 11th district
- In office January 3, 1973 – November 18, 1978
- Preceded by: Pete McCloskey
- Succeeded by: William Royer

Member of the California State Assembly from the 27th district
- In office January 7, 1963 – January 3, 1973
- Preceded by: Glenn E. Coolidge
- Succeeded by: Lou Papan

Personal details
- Born: Leo Joseph Ryan Jr. May 5, 1925 Lincoln, Nebraska, U.S.
- Died: November 18, 1978 (aged 53) Port Kaituma, Guyana
- Cause of death: Assassination (gunshot wounds)
- Resting place: Golden Gate National Cemetery
- Party: Democratic
- Spouses: Margaret Ryan (m. 1948; div. 1971) Florence Mehaffy (m. 1976; div. 1977)
- Children: 5
- Education: Creighton University (BA, MS)
- Awards: Congressional Gold Medal (posthumous)

Military service
- Allegiance: United States
- Branch: United States Navy
- Service years: 1943–1946
- Conflict: World War II

Leo Joseph Ryan Jr. (May 5, 1925 – November 18, 1978) was an American politician and teacher. A member of the Democratic Party, he represented California's 11th congressional district in the U.S. House of Representatives from 1973 until his assassination in the Jonestown massacre in 1978. Before that, he served in the California State Assembly, representing the state's 27th district.

After the 1965 Watts riots, Ryan took a job as a substitute school teacher to investigate and document conditions in the Los Angeles area. In 1970, he launched an investigation into California prisons. While presiding as chairman of the Assembly committee that oversaw prison reform, he used a pseudonym to enter Folsom State Prison as an inmate. During his time in Congress, Ryan traveled to Newfoundland to investigate the practice of seal hunting. He was also known for his vocal criticism of the lack of congressional oversight of the Central Intelligence Agency (CIA), and co-authored the Hughes–Ryan Amendment, passed in 1974, which requires the president of the United States to report covert CIA activity to Congress.

In 1978, Ryan traveled to Guyana to investigate claims that people were being held against their will at the Peoples Temple Jonestown settlement. He was shot and killed at an airstrip on November 18, as he and his party were attempting to leave. Shortly after the airstrip shootings, 909 members of the Jonestown settlement died in a mass murder–suicide by drinking cyanide-laced Flavor Aid. Ryan was the second of two sitting members of the U.S. House of Representatives to be targeted in successful assassinations while in office, after James M. Hinds in 1868. (Note: Other members of the House of Representatives have been killed while in office, although not as assassination attempts; others since Ryan's death have been the target of deliberate assassination attempts, albeit without success to date. See List of members of the United States Congress killed or wounded in office for details.)

Ryan was posthumously awarded the Congressional Gold Medal in 1983.

== Early life and education ==
Leo Joseph Ryan Jr. was born in Lincoln, Nebraska. During his early life, his family moved frequently, through Illinois, Florida, New York, Wisconsin, and Massachusetts. Ryan graduated from Campion Jesuit High School in Prairie du Chien, Wisconsin, in 1943. He then received V-12 officer training at Bates College and served with the United States Navy from 1943 to 1946 as a submariner.

Ryan graduated from Nebraska's Creighton University with a B.A. in 1949 and an M.S. in 1951. He served as a teacher, school administrator and South San Francisco city councilman from 1956 to 1962. He taught English at Capuchino High School, and chaperoned the marching band in 1961 to Washington, D.C., to participate in President John F. Kennedy's inaugural parade. Ryan was inspired by Kennedy's call to service in his inaugural address and decided to run for higher office.

== Career ==
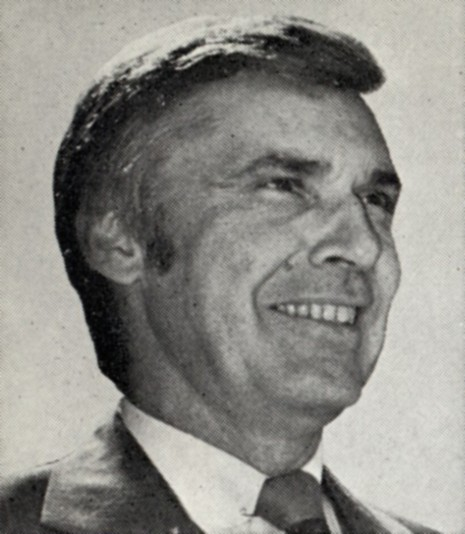
Official Congressional photo from Ryan's first term as Congressman, 1973

=== State of California ===
In 1962, Ryan was elected mayor of South San Francisco. He served less than a year before being elected to the California State Assembly, winning the 27th district race by 20,000 votes. He had run for the Assembly's 25th district in 1958, but lost to Republican Louis Francis. Ryan served as a delegate to the Democratic National Convention in 1964 and 1968 and held his Assembly seat until 1972, when he was elected to the United States House of Representatives. He was reelected three times.

Ryan aide Jackie Speier, who later served in Congress, described Ryan's style of investigation as "experiential legislating". After the Watts riots of 1965, Ryan went to the area and took a job as a substitute school teacher to investigate and document conditions there. In 1970, using a pseudonym, Ryan had himself arrested, detained, and strip-searched to investigate conditions in California's prisons. He stayed for ten days as an inmate at Folsom State Prison while presiding as chairman on the Assembly committee that oversaw prison reform.

As a California assemblyman, Ryan also chaired legislative subcommittee hearings and presided over hearings involving Tom Lantos, his eventual successor in the House. Ryan pushed through significant educational policies and authored what came to be known as the Ryan Act, which established an independent regulatory commission to monitor educational credentialing in California.

=== United States Congress ===
During his time in Congress, Ryan went to Newfoundland with James Jeffords to investigate the inhumane killing of seals, and became famous for his vocal criticism of the lack of Congressional oversight of the Central Intelligence Agency (CIA), authoring the Hughes–Ryan Amendment, which would have required extensive CIA notification of Congress about covert operations. Ryan once told Dick Cheney that leaking a state secret was an appropriate way for a member of Congress to block an "ill-conceived operation". He supported Patty Hearst, and along with Senator S. I. Hayakawa, delivered Hearst's application for a presidential commutation to the Pardon Attorney.

== Peoples Temple ==
=== First investigations ===
In 1978, reports of widespread abuse and human rights violations in Jonestown at the Peoples Temple, led by cult leader Jim Jones, began to filter out of its Guyana enclaves. Ryan was friends with the father of former Temple member Bob Houston, whose mutilated body was found near train tracks on October 5, 1976, three days after a taped telephone conversation with Houston's ex-wife in which they discussed his leaving the Temple. Ryan's interest was further aroused by the custody battle between the leader of a "Concerned Relatives" group, Timothy Stoen, and Jones following a Congressional "white paper" by Stoen detailing the events. Ryan was one of 91 congressmen to write Guyanese Prime Minister Forbes Burnham on Stoen's behalf.

After reading an article in the San Francisco Examiner, Ryan declared his intention to go to Jonestown, an agricultural commune in Guyana where Jones and roughly 1,000 Temple members resided. His decision was also influenced both by the Concerned Relatives group, which consisted primarily of Californians, as did the Temple, and by his own distaste for social injustice. According to the San Francisco Chronicle, while he investigated, the United States Department of State "repeatedly stonewalled Ryan's attempts to find out what was going on in Jonestown" and told him that "everything was fine".

The State Department characterized possible United States government action in Guyana against Jonestown as a potential "legal controversy", but Ryan at least partially rejected this viewpoint. In a later article in The Chronicle, Ryan was described as having "bucked the local Democratic establishment and the Jimmy Carter administration's State Department" in order to prepare for his own investigation.

=== Travel to Jonestown ===
In November 1978, Ryan led an investigative delegation to Jonestown as part of a government investigation, with governmental permission and funding, in his role as chair of a congressional subcommittee with jurisdiction over U.S. citizens living in foreign countries. He asked the other members of the Bay Area congressional delegation to join him on the trip to Jonestown, but they all declined. Ryan also invited his friend, Indiana Congressman and future Vice President Dan Quayle, who had served with Ryan on the Government Operations Committee, but Quayle was unable to go.

The investigative group was initially to consist only of press and a few members of Ryan's staff, but once the media learned of the trip the entourage ballooned to include, among others, concerned relatives of Temple members. Ryan traveled to Jonestown with 17 Bay Area relatives of Peoples Temple members, several newspaper reporters and an NBC TV team. When Jones's legal counsel attempted to impose restrictive conditions on the visit, Ryan responded that he would go to Jonestown whether Jones permitted it or not. Ryan's stated position was that a "settlement deep in the bush might be reasonably run on authoritarian lines" but that its residents must be allowed to come and go as they pleased. He further asserted that if the place had become "a gulag", he would do everything he could to "free the captives."

On November 14, Ryan left Washington and arrived in Georgetown, the capital of Guyana, 150 miles (240 km) from Jonestown, with his congressional delegation of government officials, media representatives and some members of the "Concerned Relatives."

Jonestown, Guyana

That night the delegation stayed at a local hotel where, despite confirmed reservations, most of the rooms had been canceled and reassigned, leaving the delegation to sleep in the lobby. For three days, Ryan continued to negotiate with Jones's legal counsel and held perfunctory meetings with embassy personnel and Guyanese officials.

While in Georgetown, Ryan visited the Temple's Georgetown headquarters in the suburb of Lamaha Gardens. He asked to speak to Jones by radio. Sharon Amos, the highest-ranking Temple member present, told Ryan that he could not, because his visit was unscheduled. On November 17, Ryan's aide Jackie Speier (who became a Congresswoman in 2008), the United States embassy Deputy Chief of Mission Richard Dwyer, a Guyanese Ministry of Information officer, nine journalists, and four Concerned Relatives representatives of the delegation boarded a small plane for the flight to Port Kaituma Airport, a few miles outside of Jonestown.

At first, only the Temple legal counsel was allowed off the plane, but eventually the entire entourage, excluding Gordon Lindsay, reporting for NBC, was allowed in. Initially, the group was warmly welcomed, but Temple member Vernon Gosney handed NBC correspondent Don Harris (mistaking him for Ryan) a note that read "Vernon Gosney and (Temple member) Monica Bagby: please help us get out of Jonestown." Jones was made aware of the note, and Gosney tried and failed to impress upon Ryan the extreme danger that his delegation was now in.

That night the media and the delegation returned to the airfield for accommodations after Jones refused to let them stay the night. The rest of the group remained. The next morning, Ryan, Speier, and Dwyer continued their interviews, and met a woman who secretly expressed her wish to leave Jonestown with her family and another family. Around 11:00 a.m., the media and the delegation returned and took part in interviewing Peoples Temple members. Around 3:00 p.m., 14 Temple defectors, and Larry Layton posing as a defector, boarded a truck and were taken to the airstrip, with Ryan wishing to stay another night to assist any others who wanted to leave. Shortly thereafter, a knife attack on Ryan failed while he was arbitrating a family dispute on leaving. Against Ryan's protests, Dwyer ordered Ryan to leave, but he promised to return later to address the dispute.

=== Jungle ambush and assassination ===
Camera-shot by Bob Brown (NBC) of Temple gunmen

The entire group left Jonestown and arrived at the Kaituma airstrip by 4:45 p.m. Their exit transport planes, a twin-engine Otter and a Cessna, did not arrive until 5:10 p.m. The smaller six-seat Cessna was taxiing to the end of the runway when one of its occupants, Larry Layton, opened fire on those inside, wounding several.

Concurrently, several other Peoples Temple members who had escorted the group out began to open fire on the transport plane, killing Ryan, three journalists and a defecting Temple member, while wounding nine others, including Speier. The gunmen riddled Ryan's body with over 20 bullets before shooting him in the face. The passengers on the Cessna subdued Layton and the survivors on both planes fled into nearby fields during and after the attack.

That afternoon, before the news became public, the wife of Ryan's aide William Holsinger received three threatening phone calls. The caller allegedly said, "Tell your husband that his meal ticket just had his brains blown out, and he better be careful." The Holsingers then fled to Lake Tahoe and later Houston.

After taking off, the Cessna radioed in a report of the attack, and U.S. Ambassador John R. Burke went to the residence of Prime Minister Burnham. It was not until the next morning that the Guyanese army could cut through the jungle and reach Jonestown. They discovered 909 of its inhabitants dead after consuming grape Flavor-aid mixed with several poisons. They died in what the United States House of Representatives described as a "mass suicide/murder ritual."

=== Conviction of Larry Layton ===
Larry Layton (born January 11, 1946), brother of Deborah Layton, a former Peoples Temple member and author of Seductive Poison, was convicted in 1986 of conspiracy in Ryan's murder. Temple defectors boarding the truck to Port Kaituma had said of Layton that "there's no way he's a defector. He's too close to Jones." Layton was the only former Temple member to be tried in the United States for criminal acts relating to the murders at Jonestown. He was convicted on four different conspiracy-related counts.

On March 3, 1987, Layton was sentenced to concurrent sentences of life in prison for "aiding and abetting the murder of Congressman Leo Ryan", "conspiracy to murder an internationally protected person, Richard Dwyer, Deputy Chief of Mission for the United States in the Republic of Guyana", as well as 15 years in prison on other related counts. He was eligible for parole in five years. On June 3, 1987, the United States District Court for the Northern District of California denied Layton's motion to set aside the conviction "on the ground that he was denied the effective assistance of counsel during his second trial". After 18 years in prison, Layton was released on parole in April 2002.

== Memorial ==
Veterans for Peace Chapter 124 was named the Leo J. Ryan Memorial chapter.

=== Burial ===
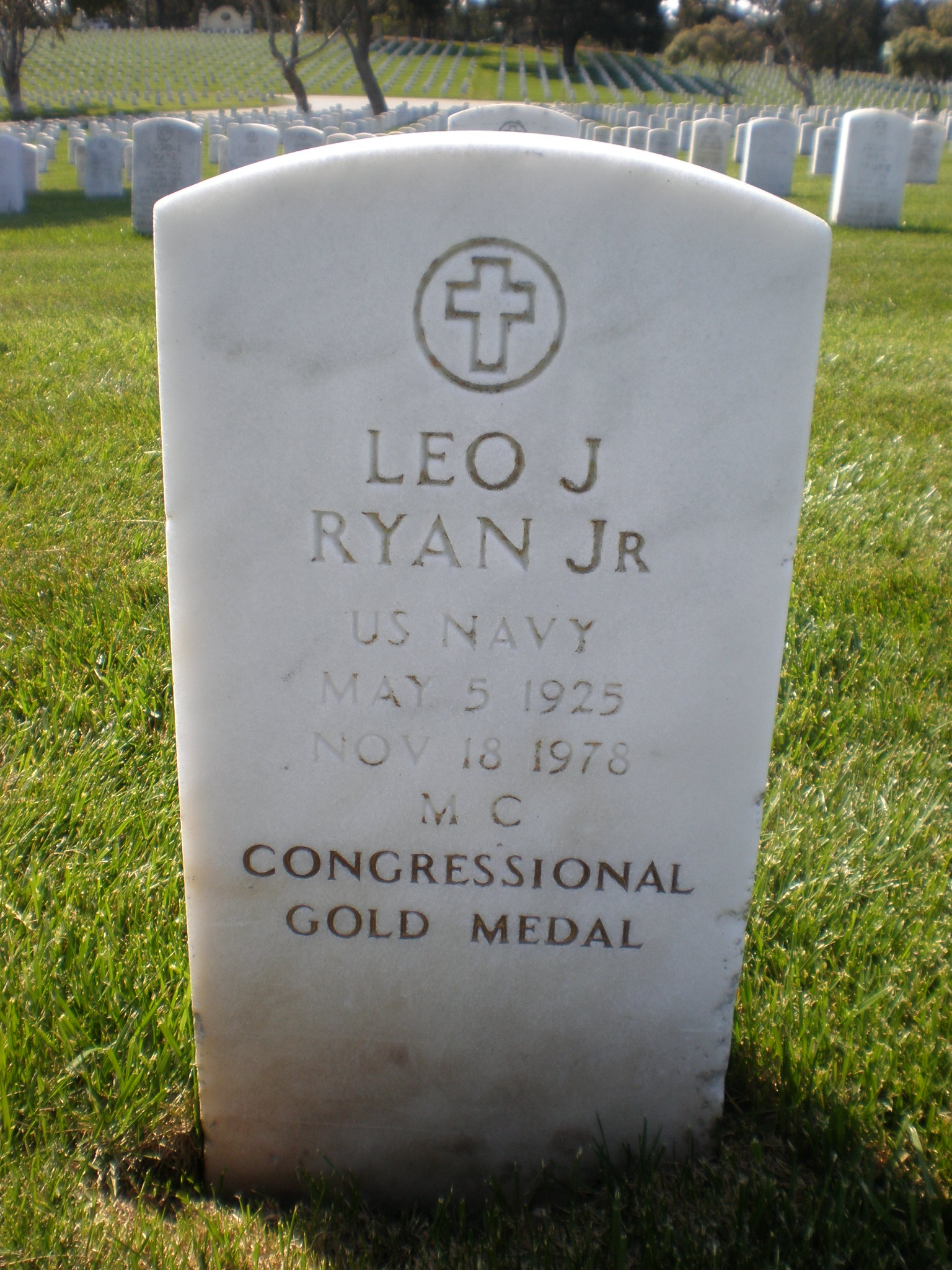
Ryan's headstone

Ryan's body was returned to the United States and interred at Golden Gate National Cemetery in San Bruno, California. His official Congressional Memorial Services were compiled into a book, Leo J. Ryan – Memorial Services – Held In The House Of Representatives & Senate Of The U.S., Together With Remarks. Ryan's younger sister Shannon said she was surprised both by the number of supporters who attended the funeral and by the "outgrowth of real, honest sorrow".

== Legacy and honors ==
- In 1983, the United States Congress posthumously awarded Ryan a Congressional Gold Medal, as the only member of Congress killed in the line of duty; President Ronald Reagan signed the bill. In Reagan's remarks about the medal, he said: "It was typical of Leo Ryan's concern for his constituents that he would investigate personally the rumors of mistreatment in Jonestown that reportedly affected so many from his district." Ryan's daughters Patricia and Erin helped garner support for the medal in time for the fifth anniversary of his death.
- In 1984, the National Archives and Records Center in San Bruno, California was named the Leo J. Ryan Federal Building in his honor, through a Congressional bill passed unanimously and signed by Reagan.
- In 1998, Jackie Speier, Ryan's former aide, was elected to the California State Senate. In 2008, she won a special election to the US Congress from California's 12th congressional district, much of it formerly Ryan's constituency. Since 2013, it has been the state's 14th congressional district.

=== Daughters ===
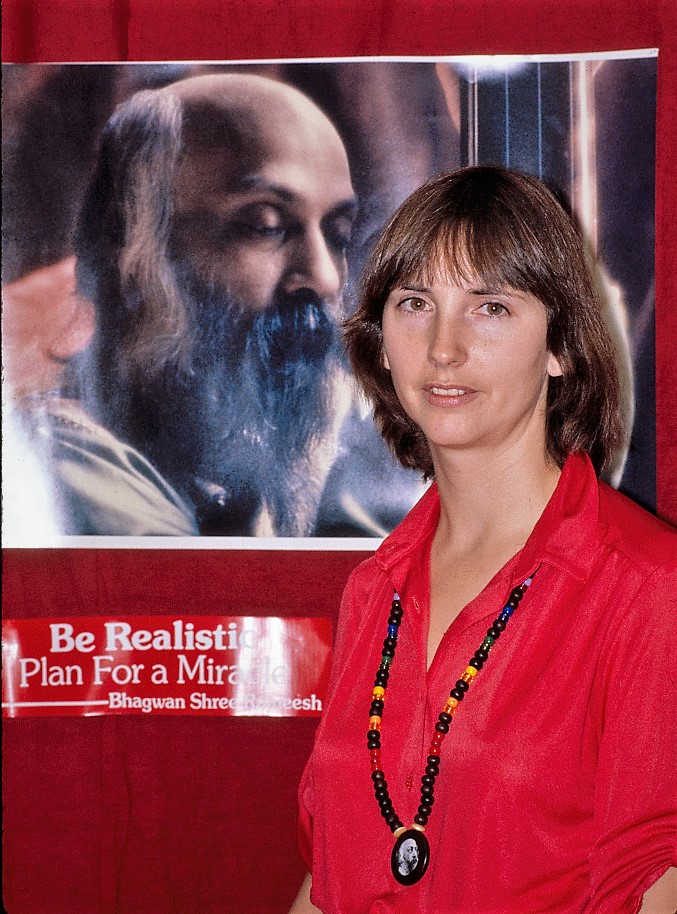
Shannon Jo Ryan in 1981

Shannon Jo Ryan (born 1952), Ryan's eldest daughter, joined the Rajneesh movement. After the Bhagwan moved to Oregon in 1981, she joined his commune, which became known as Rajneeshpuram. Taking the name Ma Amrita Pritam, by December 1982 she had married another member, who also lived at the commune.

Patricia Ryan (born 1953) received her master's degree in public administration from George Washington University in Washington, D.C., and served from 2001 to 2012 as executive director of the California Mental Health Directors Association (now the County Behavioral Health Directors Association of California). During the 1980s she became involved as a volunteer and eventually served as president of the board of the national Cult Awareness Network.

Erin Ryan (born 1958) graduated from the University of California, Hastings College of the Law and worked as an intelligence analyst for the Central Intelligence Agency until 1992. She next worked in New York as a pastry chef for eight years. In 2000, Erin Ryan became an aide to her father's former aide, California Congresswoman Jackie Speier.

=== Anniversaries ===
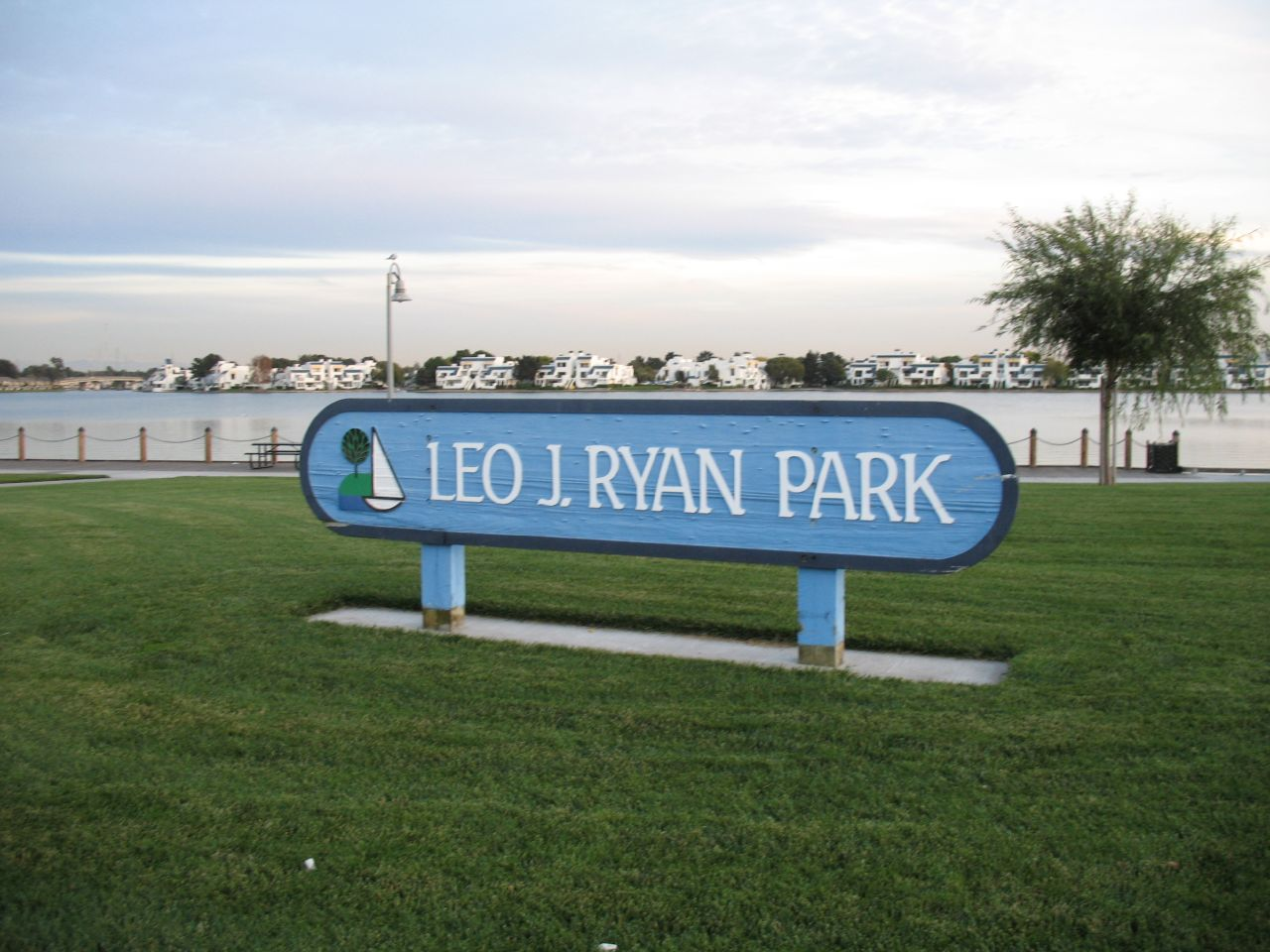
Sign at the Leo J. Ryan Memorial Park

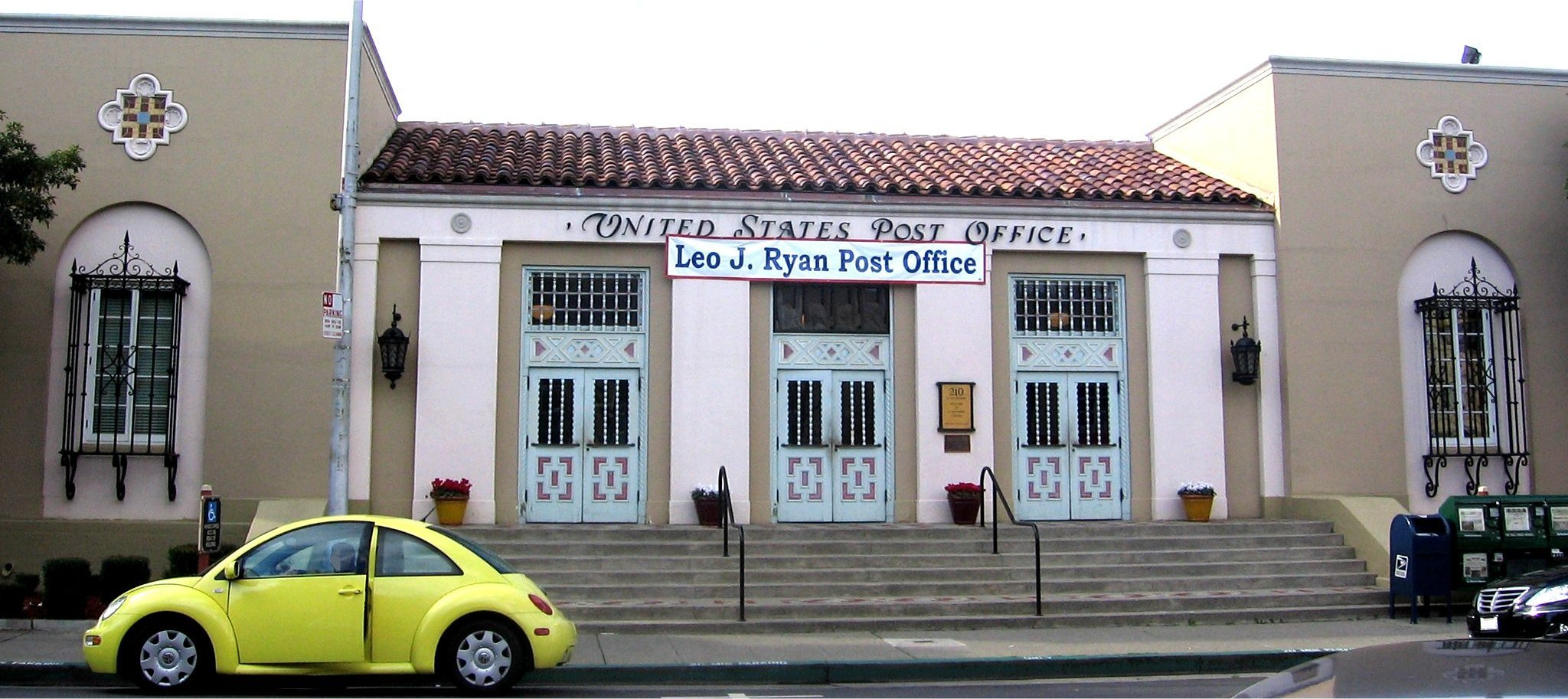
Leo J. Ryan Post Office Building

On the 25th anniversary of Ryan's death, a special memorial tribute was held in his honor in Foster City, California. His family and friends, including his three daughters and Jackie Speier, attended. The San Francisco Chronicle reported, "Over and over today, people described a great man who continually exceeded his constituents' expectations."

Near the end of the memorial service, parents of those who had died in Jonestown stood to honor and thank Ryan for giving his life while trying to save their children. After the service ended, mounted police escorted the family and friends into Foster City's Leo J. Ryan Memorial Park. A wreath was laid next to a commemorative rock that honors Ryan.

The same year, his daughter Erin Ryan, an aide to Speier, attended a memorial for those who died at Jonestown, held at the Evergreen Cemetery in Oakland. On each anniversary of Leo Ryan's death, Jackie Speier and Patricia Ryan visit his grave at the Golden Gate National Cemetery.

For the 30th anniversary, Speier sponsored a bill to designate the United States Postal Service facility at 210 South Ellsworth Avenue in San Mateo, California, the "Leo J. Ryan Post Office Building". President George W. Bush signed it into law on October 21, 2008. On November 17, 2008, Speier spoke at the dedication ceremony at the post office. In part, she said,

There are those – still, thirty years after his passing – who question his motives, or the wisdom of his actions. But criticism was just fine with Leo. Leo Ryan never did anything because he thought it would make him popular. He was more interested in doing what he knew was right.

== In popular culture ==
Ryan has been portrayed in films about the Jonestown mass murder/suicide, including by actor Gene Barry in the 1979 film Guyana: Crime of the Century, and by Ned Beatty in the 1980 made-for-TV miniseries Guyana Tragedy: The Story of Jim Jones.

His assassination was discussed in the documentaries Jonestown: The Life and Death of Peoples Temple (2006), on The History Channel documentaries Cults: Dangerous Devotion and Jonestown: Paradise Lost (2006), and the MSNBC production Witness to Jonestown (2008), which aired on the 30th anniversary of Ryan's assassination and the mass suicides at Jonestown. In 2012, National Geographic's Seconds From Disaster aired the sixth-season episode "Jonestown Cult Suicide", which recreated Ryan's assassination. His role in the Jonestown Massacre was show in the series Murder Made Me Famous, appearing in the episode "Jim Jones".

== Electoral history ==
1978 election for U.S. House of Representatives (CD 11)

- Leo J. Ryan (D), 60.5%
- Dave Welch (R), 35.6%
- Nicholas W. Kudrovzeff (American Independent) 3.9%

1976 election for U.S. House of Representatives (CD 11)

- Leo J. Ryan (D), 61.1%
- Bob Jones (R), 35.4%
- Nicholas W. Kudrovzeff (American Independent) 3.5%

1974 election for U.S. House of Representatives (CD 11)

- Leo J. Ryan (D), 75.8%
- Brainard G. "Bee" Merdinger (R), 21.3%
- Nicholas W. Kudrovzeff (American Independent) 2.9%

1972 election for U.S. House of Representatives (CD 11)

- Leo J. Ryan (D), 60.4%
- Charles E. Chase (R), 37%
- Nicholas W. Kudrovzeff (American Independent) 2.6%

1970 Race for California State Assembly (AD 27)

- Leo J. Ryan (D), 73.2%
- John R. Sherman (R), 23.1%
- John Lynch (American Independent) 3.8%

1968 election for California State Assembly (AD 27)

- Leo J. Ryan (D), 99.8%
- Will Slocum (I), 0.2%

1966 election for California State Assembly (AD 27)

- Leo J. Ryan (D), 56.9%
- Robert N. Miller (R), 43.1%

1964 election for California State Assembly (AD 27)

- Leo J. Ryan (D), 69%
- Andrew C. Byrd (R), 31%

1962 election for California State Assembly (AD 27)

- Leo J. Ryan (D), 63.5%
- Andrew C. Byrd (R), 36.5%

1958 election for California State Assembly (AD 25)

- Louis Francis (R), 50.6%
- Leo J. Ryan (D), 49.4%

== Published works ==
Books

- USA/From Where We Stand: Readings in Contemporary American Problems, paperback book, Fearon Publishers (1970)
- Understanding California Government and Politics, 152 pages, Fearon Publishers (1966)

Congressional reports

- NATO, pressures from the southern tier: report of a study mission to Europe, August 5–27, 1975, pursuant to H. Res. 315, 22 pages, published by United States Government Print Office, 1975
- Vietnam and Korea: Human rights and U.S. assistance: a study mission report of the Committee on Foreign Affairs, U.S. House of Representatives, 15 pages, published by United States Government Print Office, 1975
- The United States oil shortage and the Arab-Israeli conflict: report of a study mission to the Middle East from October 22 to November 3, 1973, 76 pages, published by United States Government Print Office, 1973

== See also ==
- Cult § Destructive cults
- List of assassinated American politicians
- List of Congressional Gold Medal recipients
- List of members of the United States Congress killed or wounded in office
- List of members of the United States Congress who died in office (1950–1999)

== Notes ==
California Assembly
Preceded by Glenn E. Coolidge	Member of the California Assembly from the 27th district 1963–1973	Succeeded by Lou Papan
U.S. House of Representatives
Preceded by Pete McCloskey	Member of the U.S. House of Representatives from California's 11th congressional district 1973–1978	Succeeded by William Royer
