= 1994 California State Assembly election =

- November 8, 1994

All 80 seats in the California State Assembly 41 seats needed for a majority

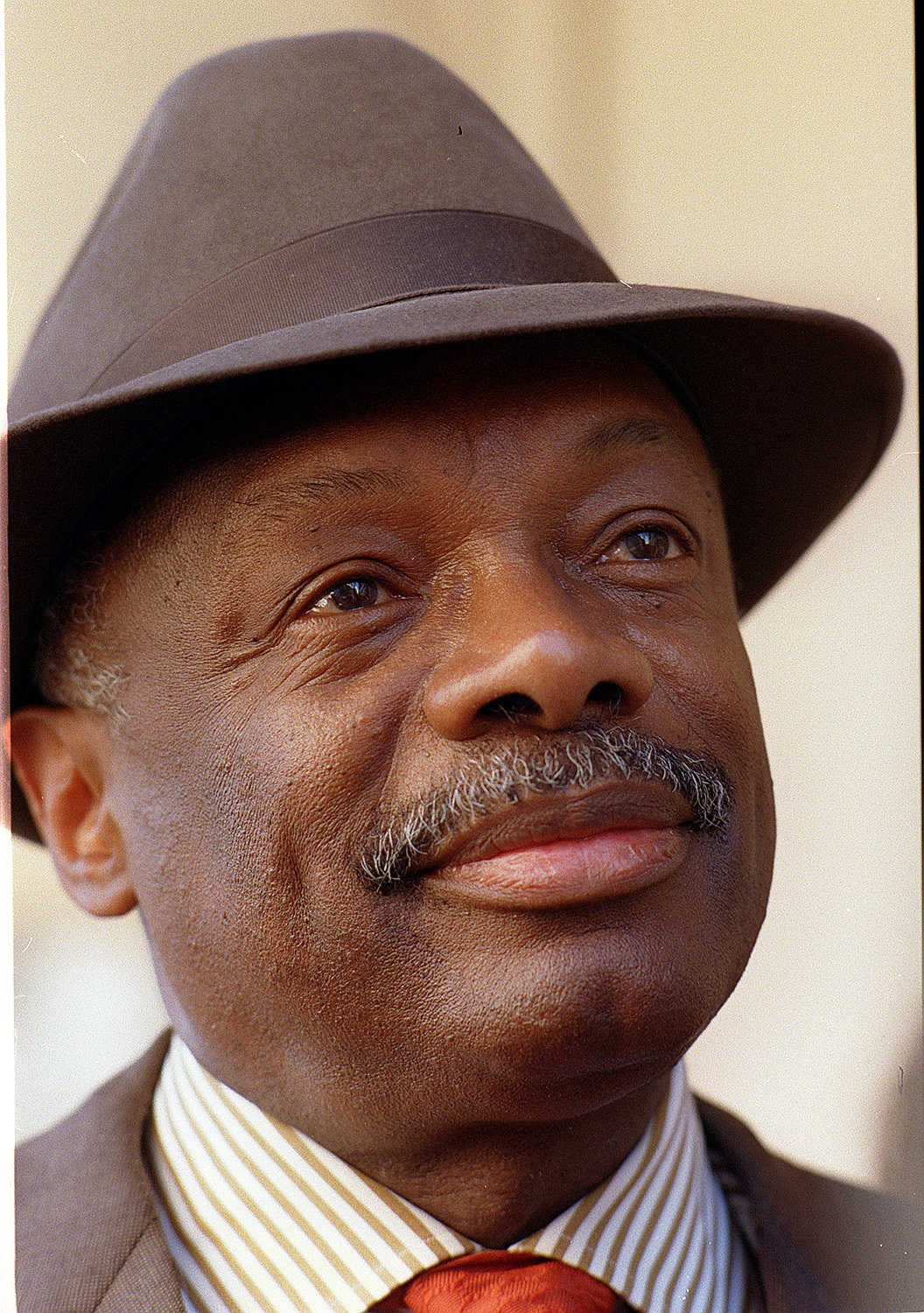
	Majority party	Minority party
Leader	Jim Brulte	Willie Brown
Party	Republican	Democratic
Leader's seat	63rd–Rancho Cucamonga	13th–San Francisco
Last election	32 seats, 42.05%	48 seats, 50.73%
Seats before	33	47
Seats won	41	39
Seat change	▲8	▼8
Popular vote	3,905,085	3,834,790
Percentage	48.82%	47.95%
- Results: Republican gain Democratic gain Republican hold Democratic hold Vote Share: 40–50% 50–60% 60–70% 70–80% 40–50% 50–60% 60–70% 70–80% 80–90% >90%
Speaker before election
Willie Brown
Democratic
Elected Speaker
Willie Brown
Democratic

The 1994 California State Assembly elections were held on November 8, 1994. California's State Assembly in its entirety comes up for election in even numbered years. Each seat has a two-year term and members are limited to three 2-year terms (six years total). All 80 biennially elected seats in the Assembly were up for election this year. Republicans gained a net of eight seats from the Democrats, taking control of the chamber by a slim margin. However, Assemblyman Paul Horcher soon left the party to become an independent, allowing Speaker Willie Brown to remain in power for a few months until Horcher was recalled.

As of 2026, this is the last time the Republicans won control of the California State Assembly.

== Overview ==
California State Assembly elections, 1994
Party	Votes	Percentage	Incumbents	Open	Before	After	+/–
Republican	3,905,085	48.82%	23	9	33	41	+8
Democratic	3,834,790	47.95%	31	17	47	39	-8
Libertarian	166,510	2.08%	0	0	0	0	0
Peace and Freedom	63,850	0.80%	0	0	0	0	0
Green	22,952	0.29%	0	0	0	0	0
American Independent	4,956	0.06%	0	0	0	0	0
Write-ins	56	0.00%	0	0	0	0	0
Invalid or blank votes	904,609	10.16%	—	—	—	—	—
Totals	8,902,808	100.00%	54	26	80	80	—

↓
41	39
Republican	Democratic

== Results ==
Final results from the California Secretary of State:

=== District 1 ===
California's 1st State Assembly district election, 1994
Party	Candidate	Votes	%
Democratic	Dan Hauser (incumbent)	87,749	61.27
Republican	John Baird	48,148	33.62
Libertarian	Charles J. Harris	7,310	5.10
Invalid or blank votes		9,986	6.52
Total votes		153,193	100.00
Democratic hold			

=== District 2 ===
California's 2nd State Assembly district election, 1994
Party	Candidate	Votes	%
Republican	Tom Woods	80,604	62.84
Democratic	James Bainbridge	42,158	32.87
Libertarian	Frederick A. Schwartz	5,508	4.29
Invalid or blank votes		18,054	7.80
Total votes		146,324	100.00
Republican hold			

=== District 3 ===
California's 3rd State Assembly district election, 1994
Party	Candidate	Votes	%
Republican	Bernie Richter (incumbent)	84,341	63.35
Democratic	Jim Chapman	48,798	36.65
Invalid or blank votes		9,572	6.71
Total votes		142,711	100.00
Republican hold			

=== District 4 ===
California's 4th State Assembly district election, 1994
Party	Candidate	Votes	%
Republican	David Knowles (incumbent)	101,020	64.97
Democratic	Charles W. "Charlie" Fish	47,700	30.68
Libertarian	Clyde B. Smith	6,774	4.36
Invalid or blank votes		11,755	7.03
Total votes		167,249	100.00
Republican hold			

=== District 5 ===
California's 5th State Assembly district election, 1994
Party	Candidate	Votes	%
Republican	Barbara Alby (incumbent)	78,886	60.33
Democratic	Joan Barry	51,864	39.67
Invalid or blank votes		11,255	7.93
Total votes		142,005	100.00
Republican hold			

=== District 6 ===
California's 6th State Assembly district election, 1994
Party	Candidate	Votes	%
Democratic	Kerry Mazzoni	92,675	61.23
Republican	Brian Sobel	55,008	36.34
Peace and Freedom	Coleman C. Persily	3,672	2.43
Invalid or blank votes		13,106	7.97
Total votes		164,461	100.00
Democratic hold			

=== District 7 ===
California's 7th State Assembly district election, 1994
Party	Candidate	Votes	%
Democratic	Valerie K. Brown (incumbent)	73,389	58.48
Republican	Roger D. Williams	48,928	38.99
Peace and Freedom	Irv Sutley	3,178	2.53
Invalid or blank votes		10,455	7.69
Total votes		135,950	100.00
Democratic hold			

=== District 8 ===
California's 8th State Assembly district election, 1994
Party	Candidate	Votes	%
Democratic	Tom Hannigan (incumbent)	62,135	55.27
Republican	Bryant J. Stocking	50,282	44.73
Invalid or blank votes		9,391	7.71
Total votes		121,808	100.00
Democratic hold			

=== District 9 ===
California's 9th State Assembly district election, 1994
Party	Candidate	Votes	%
Democratic	Phillip Isenberg (incumbent)	68,686	69.95
Republican	Beth Lofton	29,513	30.05
Invalid or blank votes		8,473	7.94
Total votes		106,672	100.00
Democratic hold			

=== District 10 ===
California's 10th State Assembly district election, 1994
Party	Candidate	Votes	%
Republican	Larry Bowler (incumbent)	78,831	58.68
Democratic	T. Kathleen Wishnick	50,609	37.67
American Independent	John Rakus	4,911	3.66
Invalid or blank votes		13,503	9.13
Total votes		147,854	100.00
Republican hold			

=== District 11 ===
California's 11th State Assembly district election, 1994
Party	Candidate	Votes	%
Democratic	Robert Campbell (incumbent)	86,426	82.69
Peace and Freedom	Amanda Coughlan	18,098	17.31
Invalid or blank votes		21,053	16.77
Total votes		125,577	100.00
Democratic hold			

=== District 12 ===
California's 12th State Assembly district election, 1994
Party	Candidate	Votes	%
Democratic	John L. Burton (incumbent)	71,371	70.77
Republican	Philip Louis Wing	24,459	24.25
Libertarian	Anton Sherwood	5,014	4.97
Invalid or blank votes		23,216	18.71
Total votes		124,060	100.00
Democratic hold			

=== District 13 ===
California's 13th State Assembly district election, 1994
Party	Candidate	Votes	%
Democratic	Willie Brown (incumbent)	80,158	72.95
Republican	Marc Wolin	21,488	19.56
Libertarian	Mark Read Pickens	8,233	7.49
Invalid or blank votes		21,111	16.12
Total votes		130,990	100.00
Democratic hold			

=== District 14 ===
California's 14th State Assembly district election, 1994
Party	Candidate	Votes	%
Democratic	Tom Bates (incumbent)	97,999	78.50
Republican	David V. Anderson	19,130	15.32
Green	Hank Chapot, Jr.	7,712	6.18
Invalid or blank votes		14,721	10.55
Total votes		139,562	100.00
Democratic hold			

=== District 15 ===
California's 15th State Assembly district election, 1994
Party	Candidate	Votes	%
Republican	Richard Rainey (incumbent)	103,407	67.6
Democratic	David B. Kearns	49,554	32.4
Invalid or blank votes		17,846	10.45
Total votes		170,807	100.00
Republican hold			

=== District 16 ===
California's 16th State Assembly district election, 1994
Party	Candidate	Votes	%
Democratic	Barbara Lee (incumbent)	68,197	81.03
Republican	Andre-Tascha G.R. Ham-Lamme	15,966	18.97
Invalid or blank votes		19,925	19.14
Total votes		104,088	100.00
Democratic hold			

=== District 17 ===
California's 17th State Assembly district election, 1994
Party	Candidate	Votes	%
Democratic	Michael Machado	45,710	50.77
Republican	Ed Simas	44,316	49.23
Invalid or blank votes		7,970	8.13
Total votes		97,996	100.00
Democratic gain from Republican			

=== District 18 ===
California's 18th State Assembly district election, 1994
Party	Candidate	Votes	%
Democratic	Michael Sweeney	69,863	69.74
Republican	Don J. Grundmann	30,310	30.26
Invalid or blank votes		11,363	10.19
Total votes		111,536	100.00
Democratic hold			

=== District 19 ===
California's 19th State Assembly district election, 1994
Party	Candidate	Votes	%
Democratic	Jackie Speier (incumbent)	100,602	93.1
Peace and Freedom	David Reichard	7,459	6.9
Invalid or blank votes		6,538	6.89
Total votes		114,599	100.00
Democratic hold			

=== District 20 ===
California's 20th State Assembly district election, 1994
Party	Candidate	Votes	%
Democratic	Liz Figueroa	47,498	50.04
Republican	Scott Patrick Haggerty	40,885	43.07
Libertarian	Terry Savage	6,538	6.89
Invalid or blank votes		12,027	11.25
Total votes		106,948	100.00
Democratic hold			

=== District 21 ===
California's 21st State Assembly district election, 1994
Party	Candidate	Votes	%
Democratic	Byron D. Sher (incumbent)	79,188	62.64
Republican	Bill Mills	47,219	37.35
No party	Ronald Paul Whitehurst (write-in)	3	0.00
Invalid or blank votes		20,765	14.11
Total votes		147,175	100.00
Democratic hold			

=== District 22 ===
California's 22nd State Assembly district election, 1994
Party	Candidate	Votes	%
Democratic	John Vasconcellos (incumbent)	56,272	56.3
Republican	Karin Dowdy	43,678	43.7
Invalid or blank votes		19,482	16.31
Total votes		119,432	100.00
Democratic hold			

=== District 23 ===
California's 23rd State Assembly district election, 1994
Party	Candidate	Votes	%
Democratic	Dominic L. Cortese (incumbent)	36,575	64.33
Republican	Frank Jewett	15,647	27.52
Green	Tim K. Fitzgerald	4,630	8.14
Invalid or blank votes		10,009	14.97
Total votes		66,861	100.00
Democratic hold			

=== District 24 ===
California's 24th State Assembly district election, 1994
Party	Candidate	Votes	%
Republican	Jim Cunneen	63,113	51.15
Democratic	Ed Foglia	60,271	48.85
Invalid or blank votes		22,693	15.53
Total votes		146,077	100.00
Republican hold			

=== District 25 ===
California's 25th State Assembly district election, 1994
Party	Candidate	Votes	%
Republican	George House	66,910	54.3
Democratic	Margaret Snyder (incumbent)	52,962	42.98
Libertarian	Al Segalla	3,356	2.72
Invalid or blank votes		8,194	6.23
Total votes		131,422	100.00
Republican gain from Democratic			

=== District 26 ===
California's 26th State Assembly district election, 1994
Party	Candidate	Votes	%
Democratic	Sal Cannella (incumbent)	42,470	53.61
Republican	Greg Thomas	33,003	41.66
Libertarian	Rob Parks	3,748	4.73
Invalid or blank votes		5,488	6.48
Total votes		84,709	100.00
Democratic hold			

=== District 27 ===
California's 27th State Assembly district election, 1994
Party	Candidate	Votes	%
Republican	Bruce McPherson (incumbent)	66,995	49.57
Democratic	Bill Monning	64,309	47.59
Libertarian	O. Robert Welch	3,835	2.84
Invalid or blank votes		5,975	4.23
Total votes		141,114	100.00
Republican hold			

=== District 28 ===
California's 28th State Assembly district election, 1994
Party	Candidate	Votes	%
Republican	Peter Frusetta	43,696	50.22
Democratic	Lily Cervantes	43,307	49.78
Invalid or blank votes		9,711	10.04
Total votes		96,714	100.00
Republican gain from Democratic			

=== District 29 ===
California's 29th State Assembly district election, 1994
Party	Candidate	Votes	%
Republican	Chuck Poochigian	81,113	67.66
Democratic	Michael E. O'Hare	38,776	32.34
Invalid or blank votes		11,437	8.71
Total votes		131,326	100.00
Republican hold			

=== District 30 ===
California's 30th State Assembly district election, 1994
Party	Candidate	Votes	%
Republican	Brian Setencich	35,940	52.21
Democratic	Bryn Batrich	32,901	47.79
Invalid or blank votes		6,180	8.24
Total votes		75,021	100.00
Republican gain from Democratic			

=== District 31 ===
California's 31st State Assembly district election, 1994
Party	Candidate	Votes	%
Democratic	Cruz Bustamante (incumbent)	37,012	58.39
Republican	Glen S. Peterson	26,378	41.61
Invalid or blank votes		6,500	9.30
Total votes		69,890	100.00
Democratic hold			

=== District 32 ===
California's 32nd State Assembly district election, 1994
Party	Candidate	Votes	%
Republican	Trice Harvey (incumbent)	78,551	70.54
Democratic	Jack Keally	32,812	29.46
Invalid or blank votes		9,389	7.78
Total votes		120,752	100.00
Republican hold			

=== District 33 ===
California's 33rd State Assembly district election, 1994
Party	Candidate	Votes	%
Republican	Tom J. Bordonaro, Jr.	73,767	58.36
Democratic	John B. Ashbaugh	47,842	37.85
Libertarian	Gary R. Kirkland	4,791	3.79
Invalid or blank votes		9,471	6.97
Total votes		135,871	100.00
Republican hold			

=== District 34 ===
California's 34th State Assembly district election, 1994
Party	Candidate	Votes	%
Republican	Keith Olberg	67,073	65.84
Democratic	Timothy G. Hauk	34,802	34.16
Invalid or blank votes		9,702	8.7
Total votes		111,577	100.00
Republican hold			

=== District 35 ===
California's 35th State Assembly district election, 1994
Party	Candidate	Votes	%
Republican	Brooks Firestone	72,899	54.26
Democratic	Mindy Lorenz	55,901	41.61
Green	T. G. "Tom" Stafford	2,862	2.13
Libertarian	Chris D. Blunt	2,682	2
Invalid or blank votes		9,645	6.7
Total votes		143,989	100.00
Republican gain from Democratic			

=== District 36 ===
California's 36th State Assembly district election, 1994
Party	Candidate	Votes	%
Republican	William J. "Pete" Knight (incumbent)	75,676	69.71
Democratic	James L. Hutchins	26,913	24.79
Libertarian	Eric Fussell	5,979	5.51
Invalid or blank votes		8,526	7.28
Total votes		117,094	100.00
Republican hold			

=== District 37 ===
California's 37th State Assembly district election, 1994
Party	Candidate	Votes	%
Republican	Nao Takasugi (incumbent)	66,035	64.47
Democratic	Dorothy S. Maron	31,738	30.98
Libertarian	David A. Harner	4,660	4.55
Invalid or blank votes		11,459	10.06
Total votes		113,892	100.00
Republican hold			

=== District 38 ===
California's 38th State Assembly district election, 1994
Party	Candidate	Votes	%
Republican	Paula Boland (incumbent)	74,382	67.11
Democratic	Josh A. Arce	28,699	25.89
Green	Charles Wilken	7,748	6.99
Invalid or blank votes		14,989	11.91
Total votes		125,818	100.00
Republican hold			

=== District 39 ===
California's 39th State Assembly district election, 1994
Party	Candidate	Votes	%
Democratic	Richard Katz (incumbent)	34,976	70.57
Republican	Nicholas Fitzgerald	14,583	29.43
Invalid or blank votes		4,347	8.06
Total votes		53,906	100.00
Democratic hold			

=== District 40 ===
California's 40th State Assembly district election, 1994
Party	Candidate	Votes	%
Democratic	Barbara Friedman (incumbent)	45,926	57.92
Republican	Noel A. Degaetano	28,764	36.27
Libertarian	Kelley L. Ross	4,607	5.81
Invalid or blank votes		10,364	11.56
Total votes		89,661	100.00
Democratic hold			

=== District 41 ===
California's 41st State Assembly district election, 1994
Party	Candidate	Votes	%
Democratic	Sheila Kuehl	76,976	55.59
Republican	Michael T. Meehan	57,410	41.46
Libertarian	Philip W. Baron	4,077	2.94
Invalid or blank votes		16,347	10.56
Total votes		154,810	100.00
Democratic hold			

=== District 42 ===
California's 42nd State Assembly district election, 1994
Party	Candidate	Votes	%
Democratic	Wally Knox	74,303	63.68
Republican	Robert "Bob" Davis	36,932	31.65
Libertarian	Eric Michael Fine	5,441	4.66
Invalid or blank votes		17,681	13.16
Total votes		134,357	100.00
Democratic hold			

=== District 43 ===
California's 43rd State Assembly district election, 1994
Party	Candidate	Votes	%
Republican	Jim Rogan (incumbent)	47,895	53.72
Democratic	Adam Schiff	38,319	42.98
Libertarian	Willard Michlin	2,935	3.29
Invalid or blank votes		8,121	8.35
Total votes		97,270	100.00
Republican hold			

=== District 44 ===
California's 44th State Assembly district election, 1994
Party	Candidate	Votes	%
Republican	Bill Hoge (incumbent)	64,276	53.29
Democratic	Bruce Philpott	50,370	41.76
Libertarian	Ken Saurenman	5,980	4.96
Invalid or blank votes		10,750	8.18
Total votes		131,376	100.00
Republican hold			

=== District 45 ===
California's 45th State Assembly district election, 1994
Party	Candidate	Votes	%
Democratic	Antonio Villaraigosa	29,533	65.01
Republican	Robert K. Jung	12,702	27.96
Libertarian	Pam Probst	3,195	7.03
Invalid or blank votes		6,090	11.82
Total votes		51,520	100.00
Democratic hold			

=== District 46 ===
California's 46th State Assembly district election, 1994
Party	Candidate	Votes	%
Democratic	Louis Caldera (incumbent)	16,264	72.59
Republican	Yongchul Yang	4,762	21.26
Peace and Freedom	William R. Williams	1,378	6.15
Invalid or blank votes		3,362	13.05
Total votes		25,766	100.00
Democratic hold			

=== District 47 ===
California's 47th State Assembly district election, 1994
Party	Candidate	Votes	%
Democratic	Kevin Murray	66,884	71.81
Republican	Jonathan Leonard	17,754	19.06
Peace and Freedom	Tamara Taleebah	4,424	4.75
Libertarian	Kevin C. Murphy	4,077	4.38
Invalid or blank votes		13,747	12.86
Total votes		106,886	100.00
Democratic hold			

=== District 48 ===
California's 48th State Assembly district election, 1994
Party	Candidate	Votes	%
Democratic	Marguerite Archie-Hudson (inc.)	35,150	100.00
Invalid or blank votes		13,465	27.7
Total votes		48,615	100.00
Democratic hold			

=== District 49 ===
California's 49th State Assembly district election, 1994
Party	Candidate	Votes	%
Democratic	Diane Martinez (incumbent)	40,315	66.64
Republican	George H. Nirschl III	17,825	29.46
Libertarian	Kim Goldsworthy	2,357	3.9
Invalid or blank votes		7,894	11.54
Total votes		68,391	100.00
Democratic hold			

=== District 50 ===
California's 50th State Assembly district election, 1994
Party	Candidate	Votes	%
Democratic	Martha M. Escutia (incumbent)	23,842	74.65
Republican	Gladys O. Miller	7,064	22.12
Peace and Freedom	Alma B. Strowiss	1,034	3.24
Invalid or blank votes		3,737	10.47
Total votes		35,677	100.00
Democratic hold			

=== District 51 ===
California's 51st State Assembly district election, 1994
Party	Candidate	Votes	%
Democratic	Curtis R. Tucker, Jr. (incumbent)	46,037	69.55
Republican	Adam Michelin	20,151	30.45
Invalid or blank votes		7,860	10.61
Total votes		74,048	100.00
Democratic hold			

=== District 52 ===
California's 52nd State Assembly district election, 1994
Party	Candidate	Votes	%
Democratic	Willard H. Murray, Jr.	40,702	80.82
Republican	Richard A. Rorex	9,662	19.18
Invalid or blank votes		6,516	11.46
Total votes		56,880	100.00
Democratic hold			

=== District 53 ===
California's 53rd State Assembly district election, 1994
Party	Candidate	Votes	%
Democratic	Debra Bowen (incumbent)	66,114	51.17
Republican	Julian Sirull	56,906	44.04
Libertarian	William N. Gaillard	3,539	2.74
Peace and Freedom	J. Kevin Bishop	2,644	2.05
Invalid or blank votes		14,282	9.95
Total votes		143,485	100.00
Democratic hold			

=== District 54 ===
California's 54th State Assembly district election, 1994
Party	Candidate	Votes	%
Republican	Steven T. Kuykendall	56,225	47.57
Democratic	Betty Karnette (incumbent)	55,628	47.07
Libertarian	Alan J. Carlan	3,981	3.37
Peace and Freedom	Patrick John McCoy	2,351	1.99
Invalid or blank votes		9,396	7.36
Total votes		127,581	100.00
Republican gain from Democratic			

=== District 55 ===
California's 55th State Assembly district election, 1994
Party	Candidate	Votes	%
Democratic	Juanita Millender-McDonald (inc.)	45,084	80.59
Libertarian	Daniel O. Dalton	10,857	19.41
Invalid or blank votes		9,685	14.76
Total votes		65,626	100.00
Democratic hold			

=== District 56 ===
California's 56th State Assembly district election, 1994
Party	Candidate	Votes	%
Republican	Phil Hawkins	53,535	53.52
Democratic	Bob Epple (incumbent)	43,178	43.17
Libertarian	Arthur M. Hays	3,308	3.31
Invalid or blank votes		6,894	6.45
Total votes		106,915	100.00
Republican gain from Democratic			

=== District 57 ===
California's 57th State Assembly district election, 1994
Party	Candidate	Votes	%
Democratic	Martin Gallegos	34,228	61.61
Republican	Frank Yik	18,910	34.04
Libertarian	David Carl Argall	2,417	4.35
Invalid or blank votes		6,698	10.76
Total votes		62,253	100.00
Democratic hold			

=== District 58 ===
California's 58th State Assembly district election, 1994
Party	Candidate	Votes	%
Democratic	Grace Napolitano (incumbent)	45,078	59.3
Republican	James "Brett" Marymee	25,547	33.61
Libertarian	John P. McCready	5,394	7.1
Invalid or blank votes		8,756	10.33
Total votes		84,775	100.00
Democratic hold			

=== District 59 ===
California's 59th State Assembly district election, 1994
Party	Candidate	Votes	%
Republican	Dick Mountjoy (incumbent)	74,126	65.22
Democratic	Margalo Ashley-Farrand	39,489	34.74
No party	Gary V. Miller (write-in)	45	0.04
Invalid or blank votes		9,440	7.67
Total votes		123,100	100.00
Republican hold			

=== District 60 ===
California's 60th State Assembly district election, 1994
Party	Candidate	Votes	%
Republican	Paul Horcher (incumbent)	57,692	61.5
Democratic	Andrew M. "Andy" Ramirez	30,590	32.61
Libertarian	Michael L. Welte	5,519	5.88
Invalid or blank votes		9,125	8.87
Total votes		102,926	100.00
Republican hold			

=== District 61 ===
California's 61st State Assembly district election, 1994
Party	Candidate	Votes	%
Republican	Fred Aguiar (incumbent)	42,209	64.09
Democratic	Larry Silva	23,653	35.91
Invalid or blank votes		6,286	8.71
Total votes		72,148	100.00
Republican hold			

=== District 62 ===
California's 62nd State Assembly district election, 1994
Party	Candidate	Votes	%
Democratic	Joe Baca (incumbent)	36,127	59.6
Republican	Tom Hibbard	24,486	40.4
Invalid or blank votes		5,721	8.62
Total votes		66,334	100.00
Democratic hold			

=== District 63 ===
California's 63rd State Assembly district election, 1994
Party	Candidate	Votes	%
Republican	Jim Brulte (incumbent)	73,208	67.52
Democratic	Richard Edwards	35,217	32.48
Invalid or blank votes		9,950	8.41
Total votes		118,375	100.00
Republican hold			

=== District 64 ===
California's 64th State Assembly district election, 1994
Party	Candidate	Votes	%
Republican	Ted Weggeland (incumbent)	59,037	66.04
Democratic	Roberta "Bobbi" Meyer	24,606	27.53
Libertarian	Jane A. Henson	5,695	6.37
No party	Troy Lamberth (write-in)	53	0.06
Invalid or blank votes		8,106	8.31
Total votes		97,497	100.00
Republican hold			

=== District 65 ===
California's 65th State Assembly district election, 1994
Party	Candidate	Votes	%
Republican	Brett Granlund	64,291	63.13
Democratic	Richard D. Sandoval	37,550	36.87
Invalid or blank votes		11,315	8.05
Total votes		113,156	100.00
Republican hold			

=== District 66 ===
California's 66th State Assembly district election, 1994
Party	Candidate	Votes	%
Republican	Bruce Thompson	79,814	67.36
Democratic	David Hendrick	34,017	28.71
Peace and Freedom	Erin Wood	4,666	3.94
Invalid or blank votes		14,708	11.04
Total votes		133,205	100.00
Republican hold			

=== District 67 ===
California's 67th State Assembly district election, 1994
Party	Candidate	Votes	%
Republican	Doris Allen (incumbent)	93,952	73.39
Democratic	Jonathan Woolf-Willis	34,074	26.61
Invalid or blank votes		13,880	9.78
Total votes		141,906	100.00
Republican hold			

=== District 68 ===
California's 68th State Assembly district election, 1994
Party	Candidate	Votes	%
Republican	Curt Pringle (incumbent)	51,977	63.26
Democratic	Irv Pickler	30,184	36.74
Invalid or blank votes		9,643	10.5
Total votes		91,804	100.00
Republican hold			

=== District 69 ===
California's 69th State Assembly district election, 1994
Party	Candidate	Votes	%
Republican	Jim Morrissey	21,348	51.05
Democratic	Mile Metzler	18,558	44.37
Libertarian	George Reis	1,915	4.58
Invalid or blank votes		4,140	9.01
Total votes		45,961	100.00
Republican gain from Democratic			

=== District 70 ===
California's 70th State Assembly district election, 1994
Party	Candidate	Votes	%
Republican	Marilyn Brewer	89,493	71.68
Democratic	Jim Toledano	35,355	28.32
Invalid or blank votes		17,453	12.26
Total votes		142,301	100.00
Republican hold			

=== District 71 ===
California's 71st State Assembly district election, 1994
Party	Candidate	Votes	%
Republican	Mickey Conroy (incumbent)	92,908	71.82
Democratic	Jeanne Costales	36,458	28.32
Invalid or blank votes		17,438	11.88
Total votes		146,804	100.00
Republican hold			

=== District 72 ===
California's 72nd State Assembly district election, 1994
Party	Candidate	Votes	%
Republican	Ross Johnson (incumbent)	78,577	71.05
Democratic	Allan L. Dollison	27,086	24.49
Libertarian	Geoffrey Brown	4,933	4.46
Invalid or blank votes		15,361	12.2
Total votes		125,957	100.00
Republican hold			

=== District 73 ===
California's 73rd State Assembly district election, 1994
Party	Candidate	Votes	%
Republican	Bill Morrow (incumbent)	74,942	66.29
Democratic	Lee Walker	31,665	28.01
Libertarian	B. Wade Hostler	4,508	3.99
Peace and Freedom	Tonatluh Ridriguez-Nikl	1,936	1.71
Invalid or blank votes		15,417	12
Total votes		128,468	100.00
Republican hold			

=== District 74 ===
California's 74th State Assembly district election, 1994
Party	Candidate	Votes	%
Republican	Howard Kaloogian	71,715	60.78
Democratic	Poppy Demarco Dennis	38,465	32.6
Libertarian	Daniel Muhe	5,054	4.28
Peace and Freedom	Claudio Ferrari	2,758	2.34
Invalid or blank votes		17,647	13.01
Total votes		135,639	100.00
Republican hold			

=== District 75 ===
California's 75th State Assembly district election, 1994
Party	Candidate	Votes	%
Republican	Jan Goldsmith (incumbent)	91,109	70.02
Democratic	Katherine Wodehouse	31,145	23.94
Libertarian	J. C. Anderson	4,768	3.66
Peace and Freedom	Ann Archer	3,097	2.38
Invalid or blank votes		12,631	8.85
Total votes		142,750	100.00
Republican hold			

=== District 76 ===
California's 76th State Assembly district election, 1994
Party	Candidate	Votes	%
Democratic	Susan Davis	54,055	49.43
Republican	Bob Trettin	49,884	45.62
Libertarian	Jerry Balistreri	3,525	3.22
Peace and Freedom	Donald R. Lake	1,883	1.72
Invalid or blank votes		8,688	7.36
Total votes		118,035	100.00
Democratic hold			

=== District 77 ===
California's 77th State Assembly district election, 1994
Party	Candidate	Votes	%
Republican	Steve Baldwin	53,442	55.77
Democratic	Tom Connolly (incumbent)	42,389	44.23
Invalid or blank votes		17,279	15.28
Total votes		113,110	100.00
Republican gain from Democratic			

=== District 78 ===
California's 78th State Assembly district election, 1994
Party	Candidate	Votes	%
Democratic	Dierdre "Dede" Alpert	63,557	52.54
Republican	Bruce Henderson	53,980	44.62
Peace and Freedom	James Fife	3,437	2.84
Invalid or blank votes		8,099	6.27
Total votes		129,073	100.00
Democratic hold			

=== District 79 ===
California's 79th State Assembly district election, 1994
Party	Candidate	Votes	%
Democratic	Denise Moreno Ducheny (inc.)	34,081	67.46
Republican	John Vogel	14,601	28.9
Peace and Freedom	Lasal Faten	1,835	3.63
Invalid or blank votes		7,730	13.27
Total votes		58,247	100.00
Democratic hold			

=== District 80 ===
California's 80th State Assembly district election, 1994
Party	Candidate	Votes	%
Republican	Jim Battin	53,794	56.35
Democratic	Julie Bornstein (incumbent)	41,671	43.65
Invalid or blank votes		7,625	7.4
Total votes		103,090	100.00
Republican gain from Democratic			

== See also ==
- California State Senate
- California State Senate elections, 1994
- California State Assembly Districts
- California state elections, 1994
- Districts in California
- Political party strength in California
- Political party strength in U.S. states
