= Alex Lee (politician) =

American politician

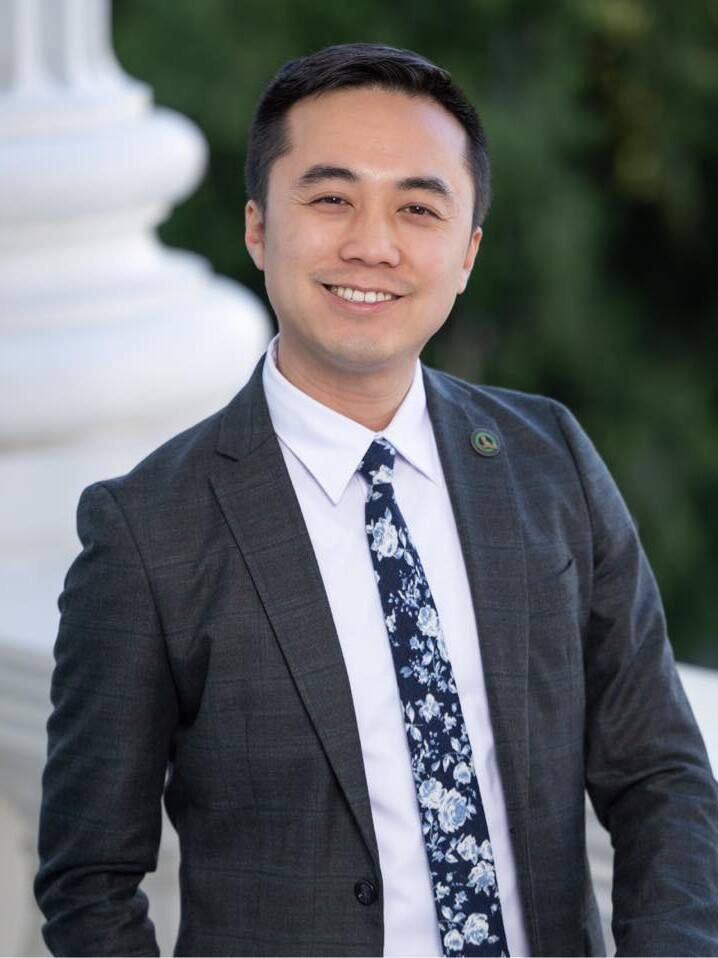
- Official portrait, 2025

Member of the California State Assembly
- Incumbent
- Assumed office December 7, 2020
- Preceded by: Kansen Chu
- Constituency: 25th district (2020–2022); 24th district (2022–present)

Personal details
- Born: Alex Tinming Lee; July 11, 1995 (age 31) San Jose, California, U.S.
- Party: Democratic
- Education: University of California, Davis (BA)
- Website: Assembly website Campaign website

Alex Tinming Lee (Note: Chinese: 李天明; Jyutping: Lei^{5} Tin^{1} Ming^{4}) (born July 11, 1995) is an American politician who has served as a member of the California State Assembly since 2020, having represented the 24th district since 2022 and the 25th district from 2020 to 2022. A member of the Democratic Party, Lee's district includes Fremont, Newark, Sunol, Milpitas, and parts of eastern San Jose.

A YIMBY democratic socialist, Lee is one of the most progressive members of the California legislature. During his tenure, he has been a strong supporter of legislation to increase housing, in particular social housing.

== Early life, education, and career ==
Alex Tinming Lee was born on July 11, 1995, in San Jose, California. His parents immigrated to the United States from Hong Kong. His father is an engineer and his mother is a nurse. After his parents divorced, Lee lived alternately with his father in Milpitas and his mother in North San Jose.

Lee graduated from Milpitas High School in 2013. He became interested in filmmaking and eventually decided to pursue a dual degree in political science and communications at the University of California, Davis. In 2015, Alex Lee became the first president pro tempore of the ASUCD senate to be removed mid-quarter after a controversy involving accusations of Lee intentionally excluding a senator from an interview committee that would be screening candidates for sitting senator's replacement. Lee ran for a seat on the student senate at UC Davis in 2014 and served as student body president in 2016. He graduated with a bachelor of arts in 2017.

While attending college, Lee was an intern for several politicians including Mike Honda, Ed Chau, Evan Low, Cecilia Aguiar-Curry, and Kansen Chu. He began working for Henry Stern as a full-time legislative aide after graduating college. Prior to running for office, Lee delivered food, and lived with his mother due to the high cost of living in his district.

== California State Assembly ==
In June 2019, Lee announced he would run to succeed Chu in the 25th district upon Chu's retirement from the State Assembly. He ran as a democratic socialist and was endorsed by the Democratic Socialists of America. In March 2020, Lee finished second in a field of nine candidates in the nonpartisan blanket primary; he split the vote with seven other Democrats and finished behind Republican Bob Brunton. Lee defeated Brunton in the general election.

Lee was sworn into the State Assembly on December 7, 2020. Taking office at age 25, he was the Assembly's youngest member, the first born in the 1990s, and the first openly bisexual member.

In 2022, Lee was redrawn into the 24th district. He placed first in the nonpartisan blanket primary ahead of Brunton, Chu, and two other Democrats, and defeated Brunton in a rematch in the general election. He was sworn into his second term on December 5, 2022.

Lee is the chair of the California Legislative Progressive Caucus.

=== Campaign finance ===
On his first day in office, Lee introduced AB 20, a bill that would ban corporate donations to political candidates.

=== Housing ===
In 2022, Lee secured $2.5 million in funding for bicycle infrastructure and services for unhoused people in Milpitas.

Lee has also repeatedly introduced legislation in favor of increasing social housing in California and the creation of a statewide public housing agency. Lee has expressed support for a land-value tax as a potential way to increase housing supply and reduce inequality. YIMBY Action, a pro-housing advocacy group, described Lee "as a strong supporter of every major pro-housing bill."

=== Immigration ===
In 2026, Lee co-authored AB 1675, No Tax Breaks for ICE Contractors Act, which would end tax breaks for California companies contracting with Immigration and Customs Enforcement (ICE). He also introduced, AB 1801, a bill to strengthen requirements regarding local permitting hearings for private detention centers.

=== Taxation ===
In 2024, Lee introduced AB 259, a proposed 1% annual tax on California residents with a global net worth exceeding $50 million and a 1.5% annual tax on those with a global net worth surpassing $1 billion. The bill failed to advance through committee. In 2026, Lee endorsed Proposition 40, a one-time 5 percent tax on their accumulated wealth, which funds would mainly be used for funding state healthcare programs.

== Electoral history ==
2020 California State Assembly 25th district election
Primary election
Party	Candidate	Votes	%
Republican	Bob Brunton	19,612	20.8
Democratic	Alex Lee	14,542	15.4
Democratic	Anne Kepner	12,823	13.6
Democratic	Anna Song	11,992	12.7
Democratic	Natasha Gupta	9,778	10.4
Democratic	Carmen Montano	9,672	10.2
Democratic	Anthony Phan	6,780	7.2
Democratic	Roman Reed	5,549	5.9
Democratic	Jim Canova	3,623	3.8
Total votes		94,371	100.0
General election
Democratic	Alex Lee	135,733	70.5
Republican	Bob Brunton	56,775	29.5
Total votes		192,508	100.0
Democratic hold			

2022 California State Assembly 24th district election
Primary election
Party	Candidate	Votes	%
Democratic	Alex Lee (incumbent)	26,531	38.5
Republican	Bob Brunton	14,730	21.4
Democratic	Kansen Chu	12,683	18.4
Democratic	Teresa Keng	9,721	14.1
Democratic	Lan Diep	5,308	7.7
General election
Democratic	Alex Lee (incumbent)	75,232	69.1
Republican	Bob Brunton	33,662	30.9
Total votes		108,894	100.0
Democratic hold			

2024 California State Assembly 24th district election
Primary election
Party	Candidate	Votes	%
Democratic	Alex Lee (incumbent)	45,605	68.3
Republican	Bob Brunton	14,975	22.4
Republican	Marti Souza	6,156	9.2
Total votes		66,736	100.0
General election
Democratic	Alex Lee (incumbent)	105,150	66.1
Republican	Bob Brunton	53,936	33.9
Total votes		159,086	100.0
Democratic hold			
