= USA/From Where We Stand =

- Paperback edition
- Author: Leo Ryan, editor
- Language: English
- Subject: American history
- Genre: non-fiction
- Publisher: Fearon Publishers, Lear Siegler, Inc., Education Division. Library of Congress Catalog Card Number: 73-116372.
- Publication date: 1970
- Publication place: United States
- Media type: Paperback
- Pages: 237
- Preceded by: Understanding California Government and Politics

USA/From Where We Stand: Readings in Contemporary American Problems is a non-fiction book published by Fearon Publishers in 1970.

The book's editor was then-Assemblyman for California's 27th District, Leo J. Ryan. Ryan later went on to become a United States representative from California's 11th congressional district. Ryan was assassinated by members of Peoples Temple in Guyana. He was posthumously awarded the Congressional Gold Medal in 1983.

== Premise ==
The book functions as a guide to California politics and government. Topics discussed include California elections, political parties, State Government including the executive, legislative and judiciary branches, local government, and finances. Information on California's legislative districts, and budget statistics are included in the appendix. Leo Ryan's introduction is a tribute to John F. Kennedy, the man who inspired Ryan to get into politics.

Ryan stated that the book's purpose was: "..to present our system of government in such a way that you will look upon it as an exciting, challenging, rewarding occupation, worthy of understanding and, perhaps, of your own ambition. Why? Because it is. It was all of that to John F. Kennedy."

== Notable contributors ==
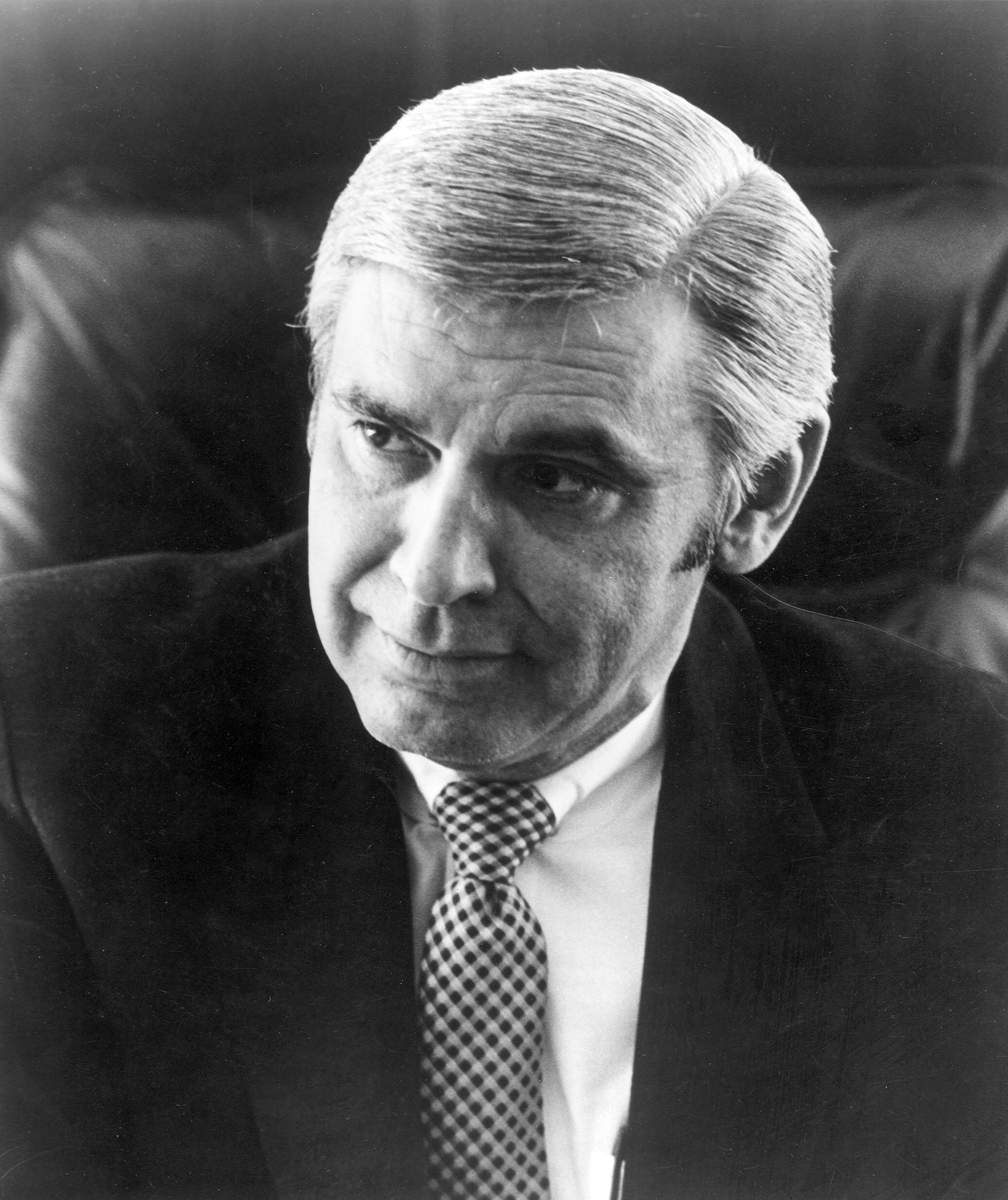
Congressman Leo Ryan

Notable contributors to USA/From Where We Stand include (in order of appearance in the book) :

- Leo J. Ryan, "From Where We Stand"
- Jesse M. Unruh, "Effective Local Government"
- Robert Theobald, "A Fail-Safe Line for Dissent"
- Stewart Alsop, "Virus X and the Body Politic"
- Robert Hessen, "Campus or Battleground?"
- Margaret Mead, "We Must Learn To See What's Really New"
- James H. Billington, "The Humanistic Heartbeat Has Failed"
- Robert F. Kennedy, "Now We Must Learn to Speak to Each Other"
- Robert Sherrill, "The Jet Noise Is Getting Awful"
- Rachel Carson, "And No Birds Sing"
- Joseph Wood Krutch, "What the Year 2000 Won't Be Like"

== See also ==
- Congressman Leo J. Ryan
- Leo J. Ryan Memorial Park
