= California's 25th district =

California's 25th district may refer to:

- California's 25th congressional district
- California's 25th State Assembly district
- California's 25th State Senate district
