= Dave Cogdill =

American politician (1950–2017)

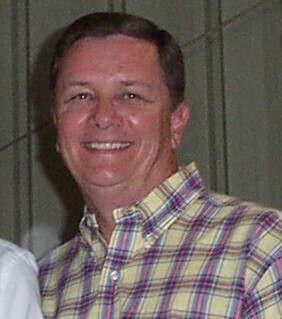
- Cogdill in 2002

Minority Leader of the California Senate
- In office April 15, 2008 – February 18, 2009
- Preceded by: Dick Ackerman
- Succeeded by: Dennis Hollingsworth

Member of the California Senate from the 14th district
- In office December 4, 2006 – November 30, 2010
- Preceded by: Chuck Poochigian
- Succeeded by: Tom Berryhill

Member of the California State Assembly from the 25th district
- In office December 4, 2000 – November 30, 2006
- Preceded by: George House
- Succeeded by: Tom Berryhill

Personal details
- Born: David Ellis Cogdill; December 31, 1950 Long Beach, California
- Died: July 23, 2017 (aged 66) Modesto, California
- Party: Republican
- Spouse: Stephanie
- Children: 2
- Profession: Real Estate Appraiser

David Ellis Cogdill Sr. (December 31, 1950 – July 23, 2017) was an American politician who served in the California State Legislature. He served in the California State Senate from the 14th district for one term from 2006 to 2010 and in the California State Assembly from 2000 to 2006. He was the Republican Minority Leader in the State Senate from 2008 to 2009.

== Career ==
Cogdill was first elected to public office in 1975 as a member of the Board of Directors of the Bridgeport Fire Protection District in Mono County.

In 1979, he moved to Modesto, where he would build his real estate appraisal business. He would live there for the remaining 38 years of his life.

He had served on various boards and commissions in both the public and private sectors, including two terms on the Modesto City Council.

=== State Assembly ===
Prior to being elected to the Senate, Cogdill represented the 25th District for six years in the California State Assembly. During that time, he served as Vice Chair of the Rules Committee. Cogdill also sat on the Budget, Agriculture, and the Joint Legislative Audit Committees. Additionally, Cogdill acted as the Assembly Minority Floor leader and was responsible for coordinating Republican efforts on the Assembly Floor.

=== State Senate ===
In 2006, Cogdill was elected to the State Senate to represent the 14th District, which comprised all or a portion of Fresno, Madera, Mariposa, San Joaquin, Stanislaus and Tuolumne Counties.

Upon his election, Cogdill was named Vice Chair of the Public Safety Committee, the Revenue and Taxation Committee, and the Joint Legislative Audit Committee. He was also named a sitting member of the following committees: Budget and Fiscal Review; Budget Subcommittee on Health and Human Services; Elections, Reapportionment and Constitutional Amendments; Human Services; Natural Resources and Water; Select Committee on Air Quality; and Joint Legislative Budget. Additionally, he was named as the Senate Minority Caucus Whip, a Republican leadership position responsible for coordinating Republican activities on the Senate Floor.

In the Senate, Cogdill focused his efforts on economic development, strengthening public safety, keeping taxes low, improving air quality, and expanding water supply and storage opportunities. He worked to prevent increased taxes and regulations on businesses and agriculture. During his time as Chair of the California State Legislature Rural Caucus, he worked on access to health care and quality education.

With his election as Senate Republican Leader in 2008, Cogdill stepped down as Vice Chair of the Public Safety Committee (although he did remain a member of the committee); switched from the Budget Subcommittee on Health and Human Services to the Budget Subcommittee on Resources, Environmental Protection and Energy; and left the Human Services Committee. He was succeeded as Caucus Whip by Senator Tom Harman. His other committee assignments and vice chairmanships were unchanged.

Shortly after midnight on the morning of February 18, 2009, after several days of late-night, contentious debates over closing a $42 billion gap in the state budget, Senate Republicans met in caucus where they voted to replace Cogdill with State Senator Dennis Hollingsworth. This removal was precipitated by Cogdill's agreement to join with Democrats as a member of the "Sacramento Six" to raise vehicle license fees and taxes during the administration of Governor Arnold Schwarzenegger.

Despite serving in the Senate only eleven months in 2010, Cogdill was the second largest taxpayer-funded gas card spender in the Senate for 2010 costing $5,941.26

=== Stanislaus County Assessor ===
Rather than seek re-election to the Senate in 2010, Cogdill ran for Assessor of Stanislaus County. He would serve as Assessor from January 2011 until his October 2013 resignation.

=== California Building Industry Association ===
In October 2013, Cogdill resigned as Stanislaus County Assessor to become president and CEO of the California Building Industry Association, a post he held until his death. Cogdill previously received campaign contributions from the CBIA during his time in the Legislature.

== Personal life and death ==
With his wife of 47 years, Stephanie, Cogdill had two children, David Jr. and Meghan. Cogdill died of pancreatic cancer on July 23, 2017.

== Awards ==
- Friend of the Year Award by the Hispanic Chamber of Commerce
- President's Award by the Stanislaus County YMCA
- "One Voice" Award by the Sacramento/Fresno Council of Governments
- Leadership Award by the Greater Area Fresno Chamber of Commerce
- "E" Award for Excellence by Leadership Modesto, an affiliate of the Modesto Chamber of Commerce
- Legislator of the Year for 2005 by the Associated Builders and Contractors
- Patti Mattingly Distinguished Legislative Award by the Regional Council of Rural Counties
- Assembly Member of the Year for 2003 and 2005 by the California State Sheriffs’ Association
- Legislative Leadership Award by the California Rural Health Association
- Legislator of the Year for 2003 and 2004 by the California Forestry Association
- Legislator of the Year by the California Mobilehome Parkowners’ Alliance
- Legislative Special Recognition Award by the Veterans of Foreign Wars
- Legislator of the Year by the California Women in Timber Association
- Modesto Man of the Year by the Veterans of Foreign War
- Distinguished Service Award by the Future Farmers of America
- Golden Trout Award for 2006 by California Trout
- Profile in Courage Award for 2010 by the John F. Kennedy Library Foundation

Political offices
Preceded by George House	California State Assemblyman; 25th District; December 4, 2000 – November 30, 2006	Succeeded by Tom Berryhill
Preceded by Chuck Poochigian	California State Senator; 14th District; December 4, 2006 – November 30, 2010	Succeeded by Tom Berryhill
Party political offices
Preceded by Dick Ackerman	California State Senate Republican Leader; April 15, 2008 – February 18, 2009	Succeeded by Dennis Hollingsworth
