= Bert A. Betts =

American politician, accountant and businessman

Bert Betts
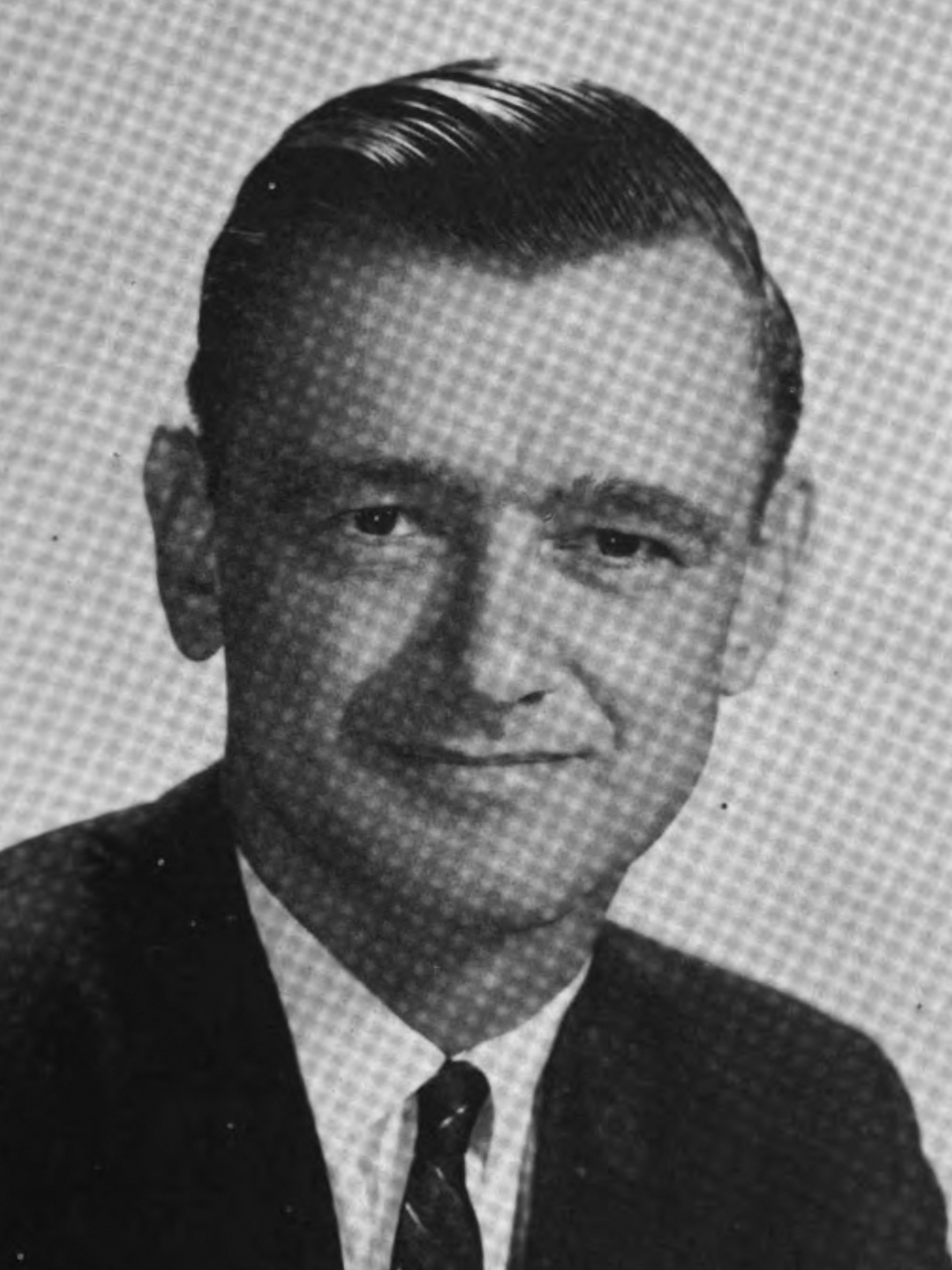

24th Treasurer of California
- In office January 5, 1959 – January 2, 1967
- Governor: Pat Brown
- Preceded by: A. Ronald Button
- Succeeded by: Ivy Baker Priest

Personal details
- Born: Bert Angus Betts; August 16, 1923 La Mesa, California, U.S.
- Died: May 28, 2014 (aged 90) Sacramento, California, U.S.
- Party: Democratic
- Children: 8
- Education: California Western College (BBA)

Military service
- Branch/service: United States Army
- Unit: United States Army Air Forces
- Battles/wars: World War II

Bert Angus Betts (August 16, 1923 – May 28, 2014) is an American politician, accountant, and businessman who served as California state treasurer from 1959 to 1967.

== Early life and education ==
Betts was born and raised in La Mesa, California. He attended San Diego State College before earning a Bachelor of Business Administration from California Western College. Betts served in the United States Army Air Forces during World War II.

== Career ==
Betts became a CPA in 1950 and later served as a member of the Lemon Grove, California School Board. He was a delegate to the 1960 and 1964 Democratic National Conventions. In 1951, Betts founded his own accounting firm, Bert A Betts and Co. He was elected California state treasurer in 1959. After leaving office in 1967, Betts established another accounting practice with offices in Sacramento, California and Portland, Oregon. Betts later worked in the mortgage industry and operated a ranch in the Natomas neighborhood of Sacramento.

== Personal life ==
Betts and his wife, Barbara Lang Betts, had eight children.
