= California Legislative Progressive Caucus =

Caucus within the Democratic Party in the California state Assembly

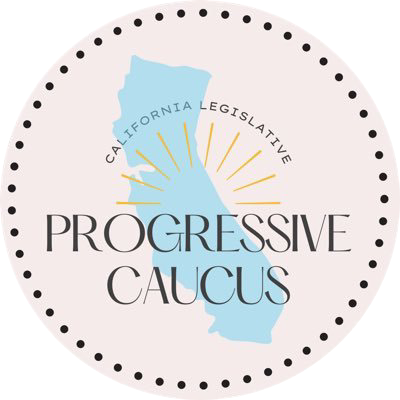
- Abbreviation: CLPC
- Chair: Alex Lee
- Founded: 2019; 7 years ago
- Ideology: Progressivism
- Political position: Center-left
- Seats in the Assembly Democratic Caucus: 29 / 60
- Seats in the Assembly: 29 / 80

Website
- Legislature website

The California Legislative Progressive Caucus is a California political organization composed of progressive members of the California State Assembly. It was formed in 2019 and currently has 29 members.

The caucus is chaired by Assembly Member Alex Lee (D-San Jose).

Guiding principles for the caucus include "fighting for economic justice and economic security for all, protecting and preserving civil rights and civil liberties, promoting secure and peaceful communities for all residents, and advancing environmental protection and climate change policies."

State Assembly districts that are represented by members of the California Legislative Progressive Caucus
