= A. Ronald Button =

American politician (1903–1987)

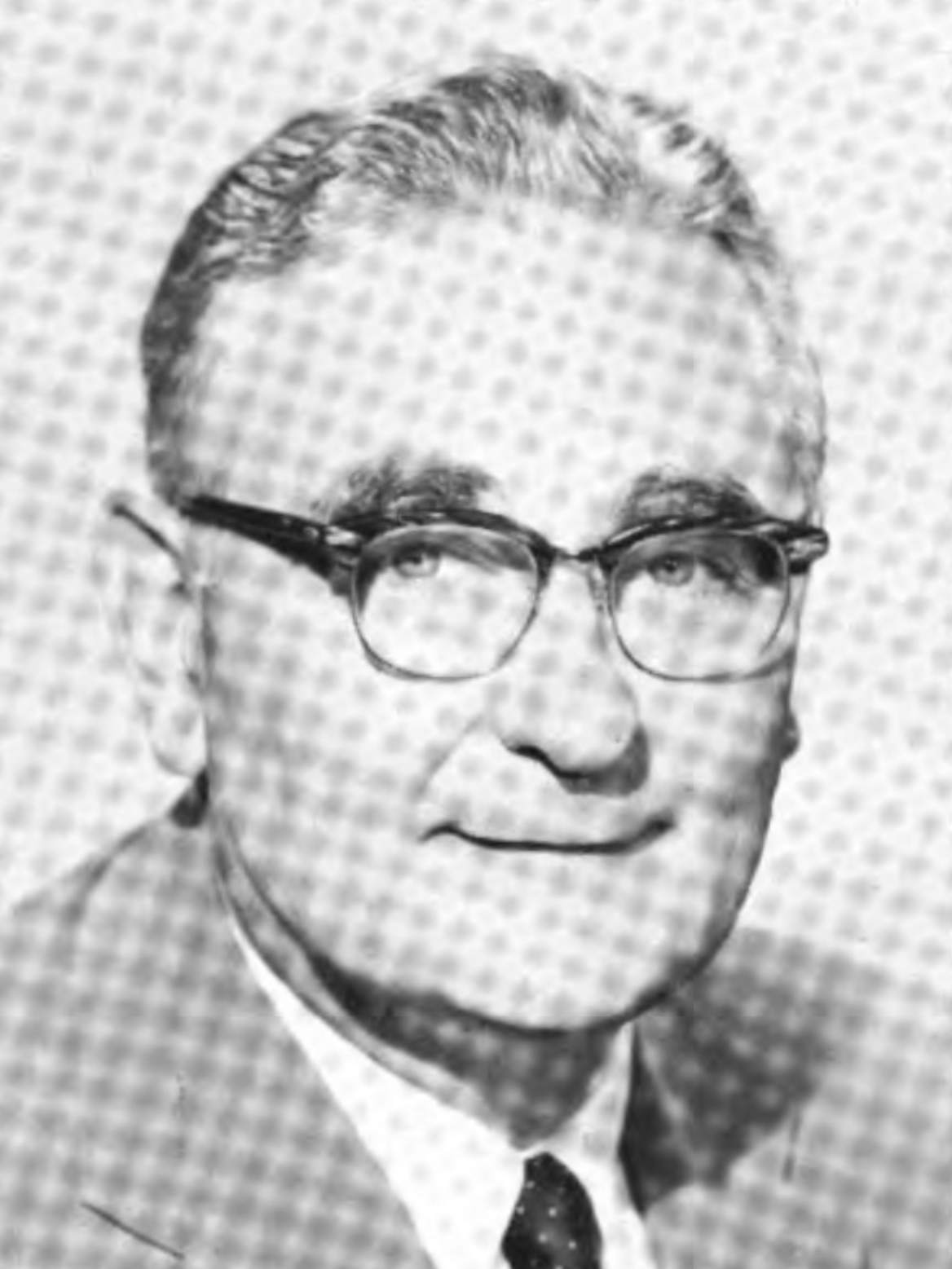

23rd Treasurer of California
- In office January 5, 1956 – October 31, 1959
- Governor: Goodwin Knight
- Preceded by: Charles G. Johnson
- Succeeded by: Bert A. Betts

Personal details
- Born: August 29, 1903 Plainview, Nebraska, U.S.
- Died: January 31, 1987 (aged 83) Los Angeles, California, U.S.
- Party: Republican
- Spouse: Gladys McConnell (m. 1931)
- Children: 1
- Education: Stanford University (BA); Harvard University (LLB)

Military service
- Branch/service: United States Army
- Unit: Army Signal Corps
- Battles/wars: World War II

Albert Ronald Button (August 29, 1903 – January 31, 1987) was an American attorney and politician who served as California state treasurer from 1956 to 1959.

== Early life and education ==
Button was born in Plainview, Nebraska and graduated from Stanford University and Harvard Law School.

== Career ==
In 1928, he began to practice in Hollywood, where he had a number of celebrity clients, including Hedy Lamarr and Thelma Todd. He specialized in corporate and business law. During World War II, he was a major in the Army Signal Corps motion picture division, spending much of his duty time at Hal Roach Studios with actor Ronald Reagan.

Button was Republican State Central Committee chairman in 1953, when he was selected for the Republican National Committee in which he remained for three years. On November 1, 1956, California Governor Goodwin Knight appointed him state treasurer, succeeding Charles G. Johnson, who retired after 34 years in office amid a dispute with Knight and allegations of funneling state funds for personal use.

After he left state government in 1959, Button was a key developer of Rancho Mirage near Palm Springs.

At the 1964 California Republican Assembly Convention, Button, alongside Edward S. Shattuck and G. Harvey Mydland, headed the liberal Rockefeller delegation.

== Personal life ==
In September 1931, he married actress Gladys McConnell, and they had a daughter.

== See also ==
- Glenn E. Coolidge

Political offices
| Preceded by Charles G. Johnson | State Treasurer of California; 1956–1959 | Succeeded by Bert A. Betts |
