= Daniel J. Creedon =

American politician (1914–1982)

Member of the California State Assembly from the 25th district
- In office January 5, 1953 - January 4, 1955
- Preceded by: Robert I. McCarthy
- Succeeded by: Louis Francis

Personal details
- Born: July 27, 1914 San Francisco, California
- Died: October 5, 1982 (aged 68) Sacramento, California
- Party: Republican
- Spouse: Gretchen Temple (m. 1941)
- Children: 1

Military service
- Branch/service: United States Navy
- Battles/wars: World War II

Daniel J. Creedon (July 27, 1914 - October 5, 1982) was an American politician who served in the California State Assembly for the 25th district from 1953 to 1955. During World War II he served in the United States Navy.
