= William F. Stanton =

American politician (1923–2024)

Member of the California State Assembly from the 25th district
- In office January 7, 1963 – January 2, 1967
- Preceded by: Louis Francis
- Succeeded by: Earle P. Crandall

Personal details
- Born: February 7, 1923 Washington, D.C., U.S.
- Died: September 10, 2024 (aged 101) Palo Alto, California, U.S.
- Party: Democratic
- Spouse: Patricia White (m. 1954; div. 1972)
- Children: 1

Military service
- Branch/service: United States Army
- Battles/wars: World War II

William Fitzgerald Stanton (February 7, 1923 – September 10, 2024) was an American politician who served as a Redwood City councilmember and California Assemblyman.

== Life and career ==
Stanton served in the United States Army during World War II. After the war he married Patricia White and was later elected to the city council in Redwood City.

In November 1962, Bill Stanton ran as a Democrat to represent California's 25th State Assembly district, beating the Republican Al Alves by 30,908 votes to 23,259.

Stanton retained his seat at the November 1964 election, where he again faced Alves, increasing his lead to 48,393 votes against Alves's 24,480.

Bill Stanton was known as a liberal activist in the legislature. For the 1965–66 session he was seated next to freshman San Francisco legislator Willie Brown, who would go on to be a long-time assembly speaker and San Francisco mayor. Stanton, Brown, John Burton and Gordon Winton were the only four assembly members who refused to vote for re-election of Jesse M. Unruh as speaker, with Stanton declaring "I am not an Unruh Democrat or a [Pat] Brown Democrat but a member of a third force."

Stanton faced his third election in AD25 in November 1966, and despite getting 38,321 votes, lost to Republican Earle P. Crandall who had served as superintendent of San José schools for many years.

Stanton was a professor at several institutions, including UCLA, Arizona State University, San Jose State University, San Francisco State University, University of Paris, and Free University of Berlin. He died in Palo Alto on September 10, 2024, at the age of 101. He was the second-longest lived California legislator, behind Willard M. Huyck.

== Sources ==
- Richardson, James (1996). Willie Brown: A Biography. University of California Press.
