= Elizabeth Rudel Smith =

Canadian-born American treasurer (1911–1997)

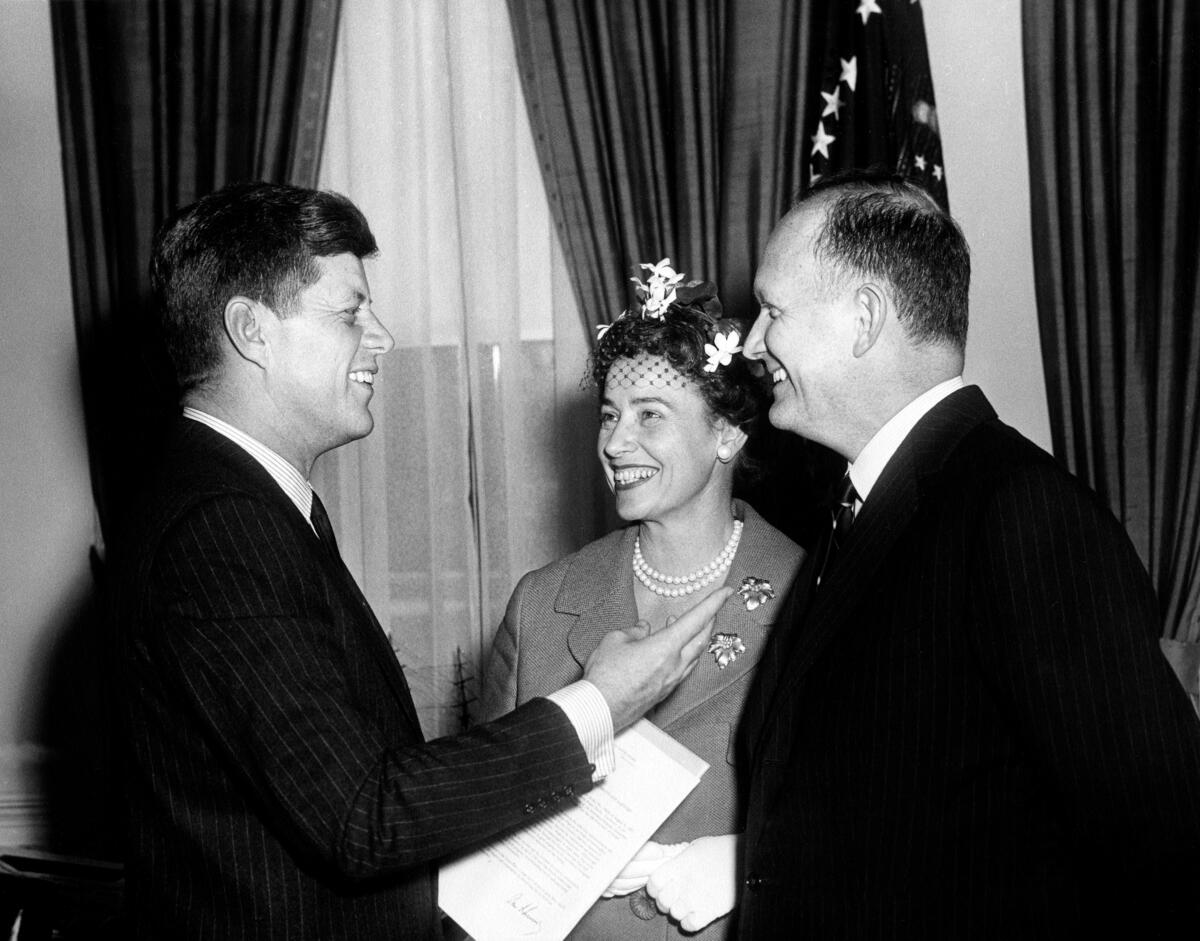
- Appointment of Elizabeth Rudel Smith as Chairwoman of the Interdepartmental Committee for the Voluntary Payroll Savings Plan for the Purchase of U.S. Savings Bonds by John F. Kennedy, with C. Douglas Dillon, Secretary of the Treasury.

31st Treasurer of the United States
- In office January 30, 1961 – April 13, 1962
- President: John F. Kennedy
- Preceded by: Ivy Baker Priest
- Succeeded by: Kathryn E. Granahan

Personal details
- Born: Elizabeth Rudel; April 27, 1911 Montreal, Quebec, Canada
- Died: January 25, 1997 (aged 85)
- Party: Democratic
- Spouse(s): Frederick H. Smith IV (1942, div.); Albert W. Gatov (1962–1978, his death)
- Education: University of Michigan
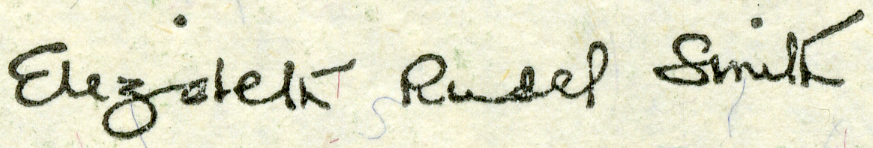
- Signature

Elizabeth Rudel Smith Gatov (April 27, 1911 – January 25, 1997) was a leader of the California Democratic Party who served as Treasurer of the United States, 1961–1962.

== Early life ==
She was born in Montreal, the daughter of a Canadian-American industrialist who owned the Rudel Machinery Company, attended Smith College and graduated in 1937 from the University of Michigan.

== Personal life ==
In 1942, she moved to California when she married San Francisco businessman Frederick H. Smith IV, her third husband, whom she later divorced. She married again in 1962, to Savings and Loan executive Albert W. Gatov, who died in 1978.

Mrs. Gatov returned to her Marin home from Washington in 1962 and remained active in Democratic politics for the next 20 years. She was a close friend of the Kennedy family and many other prominent Democrats.

== Politics ==
Mrs. Gatov first became active in Democratic politics during the Truman presidential campaign of 1948. After working with the Coro Foundation in San Francisco to train young men and women for careers in politics and government, she chaired the Marin County Democratic Party, and, in 1956, was chosen as Democratic National Committeewoman from California, joining Los Angeles lawyer Paul Ziffren, the National Committeeman, as liaison with the national Democratic Party. She held that Party post until her appointment in the Kennedy Administration, which also followed brief service in Sacramento as Deputy Labor Commissioner for Governor Pat Brown.

Smith's signature, as used on American currency

== Sources ==
- Inventory of the Elizabeth R. Gatov Papers, John F. Kennedy Presidential Library
- Obituary, New York Times, February 9, 1997

Preceded by Ivy Baker Priest	Treasurer of the United States; 1961–1962	Succeeded by Kathryn E. Granahan
