= Burt Talcott =

American politician (1920–2016)

Burt L. Talcott
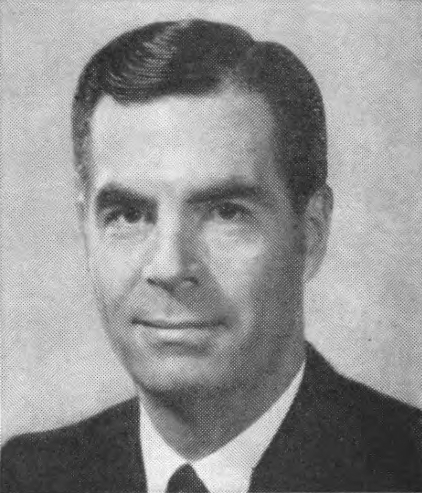

Member of the U.S. House of Representatives from California
- In office January 3, 1963 – January 3, 1977
- Preceded by: New district (redistricting)
- Succeeded by: Leon Panetta
- Constituency: 12th district (1963–75); 16th district (1975–77)

Personal details
- Born: Burt Lacklen Talcott; February 22, 1920 Billings, Montana, U.S.
- Died: July 29, 2016 (aged 96) Tacoma, Washington, U.S.
- Resting place: Arlington National Cemetery
- Party: Republican
- Spouse: Lee Taylor (m. 1942–2010; her death)
- Education: Stanford University
- Occupation: lawyer

Military service
- Branch/service: United States Army Air Corps
- Years of service: 1942–1945
- Awards: Air Medal, Purple Heart

Burt Lacklen Talcott (February 22, 1920 – July 29, 2016) was an American World War II veteran and politician who served seven terms as a member of the United States Congress from the State of California from 1963 to 1977.

== Military career ==
Born in Billings, Montana, Talcott received his degree from Stanford University in 1942, after which he enlisted in the United States Army Air Corps where he became a bomber pilot.

=== Prisoner of War ===
On a mission in a B-24 over Austria, Talcott was shot down and captured, spending 14 months in a German Prisoner-of-war camp. Upon his discharge from the military in 1945 he received the Air Medal and Purple Heart with clusters.

== Political career ==
Talcott served on the Monterey County, California Board of Supervisors and served as board president.

=== Congress ===
Talcott was elected to the 88th United States Congress as a Republican and served seven terms (January 3, 1963 – January 3, 1977) before losing his seat in 1976 to Leon Panetta in a close race, as Panetta prevailed with 53% of the vote.

Talcott voted in favor of the Civil Rights Act of 1964 and the Voting Rights Act of 1965. He voted for the initial House Resolution of the Civil Rights Act of 1968 but voted against the final Senate amendments to the Act.

Following his loss, Talcott engaged in a variety of private and public legislative work.

== Personal life ==
He resided in Tacoma, Washington, with his son and daughter-in-law, Ron & "Gigi" Talcott. He always made time for his faith and his family. He was elected to serve on the Charter Review Commission Dist. 7 Pos. 3 of Pierce County.

His wife, Lee Taylor, whom he married in 1942, died in 2010. Both Lee and Burt played active roles in the raising of their two grandchildren and six great-grandchildren. He could be found supporting his alma mater, Stanford, and making milkshake bets with his great-grandson over the outcome of their football games. The year he passed, he took a 10-hour road trip to Idaho, just to watch his 3rd eldest great-granddaughter graduate from high school.

=== Death ===
Burt Talcott died in Tacoma on July 29, 2016, at the age of 96. His remains were buried at Arlington National Cemetery.

== Electoral history ==
1962 United States House of Representatives elections
Party	Candidate	Votes	%
Republican	Burt Talcott (Incumbent)	75,424	61.3%
Democratic	William K. Steward	47,576	38.7%
Total votes		123,000	100.0%
Turnout			
Republican win (new seat)			

1964 United States House of Representatives elections
Party	Candidate	Votes	%
Republican	Burt Talcott (Incumbent)	93,112	61.9%
Democratic	William K. Steward	57,242	38.1%
Total votes		150,354	100.0%
Turnout			
Republican hold			

1966 United States House of Representatives elections
Party	Candidate	Votes	%
Republican	Burt Talcott (Incumbent)	108,070	77.3%
Democratic	Gerald V. Barron	31,787	22.7%
Total votes		139,857	100.0%
Turnout			
Republican hold			

1968 United States House of Representatives elections
Party	Candidate	Votes	%
Republican	Burt Talcott (Incumbent)	140,713	94.9%
American Independent	Ann J. Holliday	7,593	5.1%
Total votes		148,308	100.0%
Turnout			
Republican hold			

1970 United States House of Representatives elections
Party	Candidate	Votes	%
Republican	Burt Talcott (Incumbent)	95,549	63.6%
Democratic	O'Brien Riordan	50,942	33.9%
Peace and Freedom	Herbert H. Foster Jr.	3,682	2.5%
Total votes		150,173	100.0%
Turnout			
Republican hold			

=== 1972 ===
1972 United States House of Representatives elections
Party	Candidate	Votes	%
Republican	Burt Talcott (Incumbent)	105,555	54.0%
Democratic	Julian Camacho	84,268	43.1%
American Independent	Stanley K. Monteith	5,753	2.9%
Total votes		195,576	100.0%
Turnout			
Republican hold			

1974 United States House of Representatives elections in California
Party	Candidate	Votes	%
Republican	Burt L. Talcott (incumbent)	76,084	49.2
Democratic	Julian Camacho	74,018	47.8
American Independent	D. Jeff Mauro	4,576	3.0
Total votes		154,678	100.0
Turnout			
Republican hold			

1976 United States House of Representatives elections in California
Party	Candidate	Votes	%
Democratic	Leon Panetta	104,545	53.4
Republican	Burt L. Talcott (incumbent)	91,160	46.6
Total votes		195,705	100.0
Turnout			
Democratic gain from Republican			

== See also ==
- Glenn E. Coolidge

U.S. House of Representatives
Preceded by B. F. Sisk	Member of the U.S. House of Representatives from California's 12th congressional district January 3, 1963–January 3, 1975	Succeeded by Pete McCloskey
Preceded by B. F. Sisk	Member of the U.S. House of Representatives from California's 16th congressional district January 3, 1975–January 3, 1977	Succeeded by Leon Panetta
