= Ivy Baker Priest =

American politician (1905–1975)

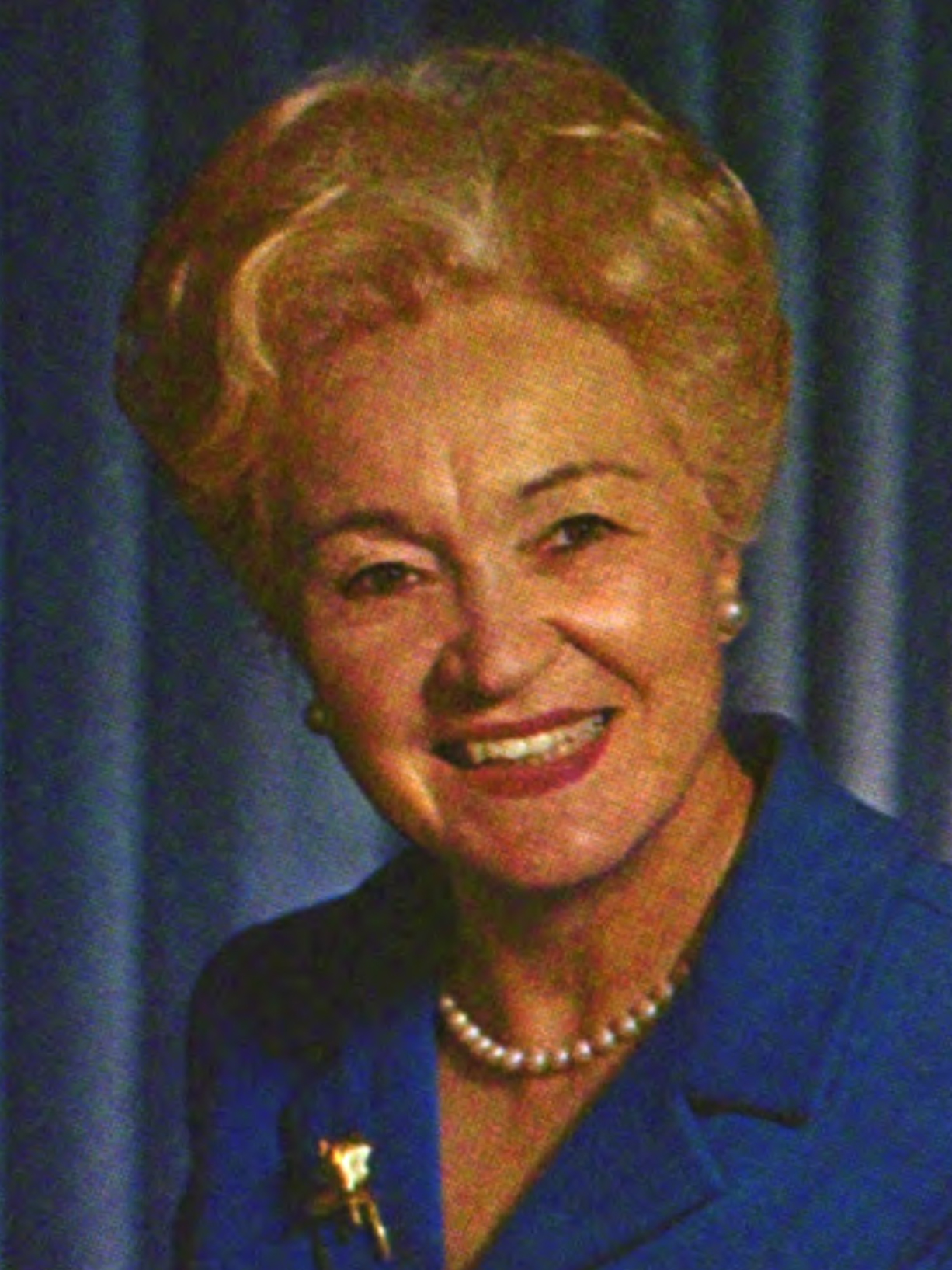
- Official portrait, 1971

25th Treasurer of California
- In office January 2, 1967 – January 6, 1975
- Governor: Ronald Reagan
- Preceded by: Bert A. Betts
- Succeeded by: Jesse Unruh

30th Treasurer of the United States
- In office January 28, 1953 – January 29, 1961
- President: Dwight D. Eisenhower
- Preceded by: Georgia Neese Clark
- Succeeded by: Elizabeth Rudel Smith

Personal details
- Born: Ivy Baker; September 7, 1905 Kimberly, Utah, U.S.
- Died: June 23, 1975 (aged 69) Santa Monica, California, U.S.
- Resting place: Wasatch Lawn Memorial Park; 40°41′52.08″N 111°50′30.12″W
- Spouse(s): Roy Fletcher Priest; Sidney Stevens
- Children: Pat Priest; 3 others

Ivy Baker Priest (September 7, 1905 – June 23, 1975) was an American politician who served as Treasurer of the United States from 1953 to 1961 and California State Treasurer from 1967 to 1975.

== Early life ==
Priest was born in Kimberly, Utah, on September 7, 1905, to Clara Fearnley and Orange D. Baker. Her father worked as a gold miner in Kimberly and later as a copper miner in the town of Bingham Canyon, while her mother ran a boarding house. She was active in politics from high school, when she worked to register voters in a mayoral campaign.

== Career ==
Priest was a delegate to the Republican state convention in 1932 and ran unsuccessfully for Congress in Utah in 1934. From 1934 to 1936, she was Regional Co-Chairman of the Young Republican National Federation.

Beginning in 1944, she served for several years as Utah's Republican National Committeewoman and, in 1950, ran unsuccessfully for Congress a second time. During Dwight D. Eisenhower's campaign for President of the United States, Priest took charge of the women's division of the Republican National Committee and was credited with the successful drive to get out the women's vote, which totalled 52 percent of Eisenhower's victory margin. She served as Treasurer of the United States under Eisenhower from January 28, 1953, to January 29, 1961.

In 1967, she became national chair of the Easter Seals.

In 1966 she was elected California State Treasurer, narrowly unseating Democrat Bert A. Betts. She was reelected in 1970 by a comfortable margin, but did not seek a third term due to declining health.

During her first term as Treasurer she was sued by John Serrano, a parent of a Los Angeles public school student, for California's inequitable system of funding public education. This case, Serrano v. Priest, together with voter-approved Proposition 13 in 1976 led to a change in California's education finance system, greatly reducing per-student spending disparities among California's K-12 school districts.

In 1968 she became the first woman to nominate a candidate for U.S. president for a major political party when she offered Ronald Reagan's name in a speech before the Republican National Convention.

== Personal life ==
Priest was a member of the Church of Jesus Christ of Latter-day Saints.

On December 7, 1935, at age 30, she married Roy Fletcher Priest (January 3, 1884-June 11, 1959), 21 years her senior, in Salt Lake City, Utah. He died on June 11, 1959, in Arlington, Virginia. On June 20, 1961, she married Sidney William Stevens. She was the mother of four children, including Pat Priest, an actress best known for playing Marilyn Munster in the 1960s television show The Munsters.

She died of cancer in Santa Monica, California on June 23, 1975. She was buried in the Wasatch Lawn Memorial Park Cemetery, Salt Lake City, Utah.

== Appearances on TV ==
On August 29, 1954, Priest was the featured guest on What's My Line?. On March 17, 1960 she appeared on Take a Good Look with Ernie Kovacs.

== References and notes ==
Political offices
Preceded by Georgia Neese Clark	Treasurer of the United States; 1953–1961	Succeeded by Elizabeth Rudel Smith
Preceded by Bert A. Betts	State Treasurer of California; 1967–1975	Succeeded by Jesse M. Unruh
