= Glenn E. Coolidge =

American politician (1902–1962)

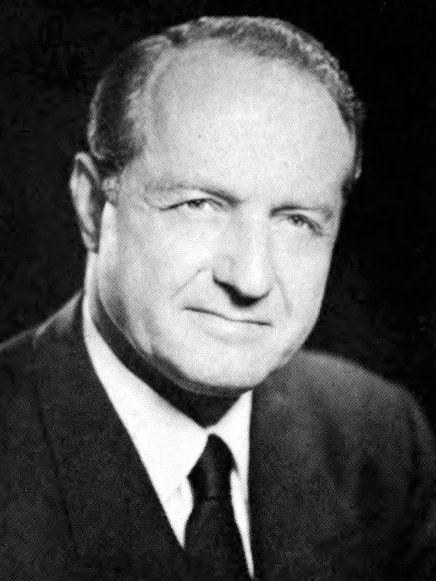
- Official portrait, 1961

Member of the California State Assembly from the 27th district
- In office January 5, 1953 – September 12, 1962
- Preceded by: Richard J. Dolwig
- Succeeded by: Leo Ryan

Personal details
- Born: December 2, 1902 Cripple Creek, Colorado, U.S.
- Died: September 12, 1962 (aged 59) Santa Cruz, California, U.S.
- Party: Republican
- Occupation: Politician

Glenn E. Coolidge (December 2, 1902 – September 12, 1962) was an American politician and member of the California State Assembly for the 27th district.

== Early life ==
Coolidge was born in Cripple Creek, Colorado in 1902 and his family moved to Lindsay, California in 1909. He married Margaret Welch, and worked in real estate and investment. Coolidge was a Republican from Felton, California.

== Career ==
He was elected to the Assembly on November 4, 1952 and won reelection four times. He was the only candidate for Assembly for the 27th District in each of his elections. Richard J. Dolwig had held the assembly seat before him, and he was succeeded by Leo Ryan.

Coolidge served as chairman of the Assembly's ways and means committee. During his time on the Assembly, Coolidge led the Republican economy bloc's attempts to stop Assemblyman Jesse M. Unruh from pushing through tax increases promoted by the Governor of California. He was active with the Alcoholic Beverage Rehabilitation Commission, whose purpose was to study issues surrounding alcoholism and methods of treatment.

Coolidge was a Delegate to the Republican National Convention from California in 1956 and 1960. In 1956 he was considered by California Governor Goodwin Knight for the position of California State Treasurer after Charles G. Johnson resigned from the position due to health concerns, but A. Ronald Button was chosen for the position.

Coolidge was the Republican candidate for the United States House of Representatives for California's 12th congressional district, and ran against Democrat W.K. Stewart from Carmel. Coolidge died of a heart attack on September 12, 1962 during his campaign for Congress in September 1962, and Republican Burt L. Talcott was elected. At the time of his death he had a bipartisan following in California state politics.

Glenn Coolidge Drive on the University of California, Santa Cruz campus is named for Coolidge.

== See also ==
- Politics of California

California Assembly
Preceded by Richard J. Dolwig	Member, California's 27th State Assembly district January 5, 1953 – January 7, 1963	Succeeded by Leo Ryan
