= California's 25th State Assembly district =

American legislative district

Current assemblymember
Ash Kalra; D–San Jose
- Population (2020) • Voting age • Citizen voting age: 497,894; 393,777; 311,695
- Demographics: 14.50% White; 2.84% Black; 42.17% Latino; 36.79% Asian; 0.23% Native American; 0.36% Hawaiian/Pacific Islander; 0.48% other; 2.64% remainder of multiracial
- Registered voters: 253,288
- Registration: 52.46% Democratic; 16.35% Republican; 25.80% No party preference

California's 25th State Assembly district is one of 80 California State Assembly districts. It is currently represented by Democrat Ash Kalra of San Jose.

== District profile ==
The district encompasses the majority of San Jose, including downtown and open space areas in southeast Santa Clara County.

Santa Clara County – (25.55%)

- San Jose – (47.02%)

== Election results from statewide races ==
Year	Office	Results
2022	Governor	Newsom 69.8 – 30.2%
2022	Senator	Padilla 71.1 – 28.9%
2021	Recall	No 72.0 – 28.0%
2020	President	Biden 70.9 – 27.2%
2018	Governor	Newsom 70.9 – 29.1%
2018	Senator	Feinstein 60.1 – 39.9%
2016	President	Clinton 73.6 – 20.9%
2016	Senator	Harris 64.5 – 35.5%
2014	Governor	Brown 75.0 – 25.0%
2012	President	Obama 72.4 – 25.3%
2012	Senator	Feinstein 75.0 – 25.0%

== List of assembly members representing the district ==
Due to redistricting, the 25th district has been moved around different parts of the state. The current iteration resulted from the 2021 redistricting by the California Citizens Redistricting Commission.

Assembly members	Party	Years served	Counties represented	Notes
Martin E. Cooke Munday	Democratic	January 5, 1885 – January 3, 1887	Sonoma	
James McDonnell Jr.	Republican	January 3, 1887 – January 7, 1889	Sonoma	
Robert Howe	Democratic	January 7, 1889 – January 5, 1891	Sonoma	
Henry Little Weston	Republican	January 5, 1891 – January 2, 1893	Sonoma	
John M. LaRue	Democratic	January 2, 1893 – April 27, 1893	San Joaquin	Died in office.
Vacant		April 27, 1893 – January 7, 1895	San Joaquin	
Edward I. Jones	Republican	January 7, 1895 – January 4, 1897	San Joaquin	
A. L. Foreman	Democratic	January 4, 1897 – January 2, 1899	San Joaquin	
Frank E. Dunlap	Republican	January 2, 1899 – January 5, 1903	San Joaquin	
Vital E. Bangs	Democratic	January 5, 1903 – January 2, 1905	Stanislaus, Merced, Madera	
S. S. Burge	Republican	January 2, 1905 – January 7, 1907	Stanislaus, Merced, Madera	
Richard Keith Whitmore	Republican	January 7, 1907 – January 4, 1909	Stanislaus, Merced, Madera	
Charles W. Wagner	Republican	January 4, 1909 – January 2, 1911	Stanislaus, Merced, Madera	
Thomas F. Griffin	Democratic	January 2, 1911 – January 6, 1913	Stanislaus, Merced, Madera	
William C. McCarthy	Democratic	January 6, 1913 – January 4, 1915	San Francisco	
Charles William Godsil	Republican	January 4, 1915 – January 3, 1921	San Francisco	
William B. Hornblower	Republican	January 3, 1921 – January 2, 1933	San Francisco	
Melvyn I. Cronin	Democratic	January 2, 1933 – January 4, 1942	San Francisco	Resigned from the State Assembly.
Vacant		January 4, 1942 – January 4, 1943	San Francisco	
Gerald P. Haggerty	Democratic	January 4, 1943 – January 6, 1947	San Francisco	
Raymond W. Blosser	Republican	January 6, 1947 – January 3, 1949	San Francisco	
Robert I. McCarthy	Democratic	January 3, 1949 – January 5, 1953	San Francisco	
Daniel J. Creedon	Republican	January 5, 1953 – January 4, 1955	San Mateo	Resigned from the State Assembly.
Vacant		January 4, 1955 – June 27, 1956	San Mateo	
Louis Francis	Republican	June 27, 1956 – January 7, 1963	San Mateo	Sworn in after winning special election.
William F. Stanton	Democratic	January 7, 1963 – January 2, 1967	Santa Clara	
Earle P. Crandall	Republican	January 2, 1967 – January 4, 1971	Santa Clara	
Alister McAlister	Democratic	January 4, 1971 – November 30, 1982	Santa Clara	
Rusty Areias	Democratic	December 6, 1982 – November 30, 1992	Merced, Monterey, San Benito, Santa Clara	
Margaret Snyder	Democratic	December 7, 1992 – November 30, 1994	Fresno, Madera, Mariposa, Stanislaus, Tuolumne	
George House	Republican	December 5, 1994 – November 30, 2000	Fresno, Madera, Mariposa, Stanislaus, Tuolumne	
Dave Cogdill	Republican	December 4, 2000 – November 30, 2006	Fresno, Madera, Mariposa, Stanislaus, Tuolumne	
Dave Cogdill	Republican	December 4, 2000 – November 30, 2006	Calaveras, Madera, Mariposa, Mono, Stanislaus, Tuolumne	
Tom Berryhill	Republican	December 4, 2006 – November 30, 2010	Calaveras, Madera, Mariposa, Mono, Stanislaus, Tuolumne	
Kristin Olsen	Republican	December 6, 2010 – November 30, 2012	Calaveras, Madera, Mariposa, Mono, Stanislaus, Tuolumne	
Bob Wieckowski	Democratic	December 3, 2012 – November 30, 2014	Alameda, Santa Clara	
Kansen Chu	Democratic	December 1, 2014 – November 30, 2020	Alameda, Santa Clara	
Alex Lee	Democratic	December 7, 2020 – November 30, 2022	Alameda, Santa Clara	
Ash Kalra	Democratic	December 5, 2022 – present	Santa Clara	

== Election results (1990–present) ==
=== 2024 ===
2024 California State Assembly 25th district election
Primary election
Party	Candidate	Votes	%
Democratic	Ash Kalra (incumbent)	35,840	51.5
Republican	Ted Stroll	18,276	26.2
Democratic	Lan Ngo	15,510	22.3
Total votes		69,626	100.0
General election
Democratic	Ash Kalra (incumbent)	107,968	68.4
Republican	Ted Stroll	49,861	31.6
Total votes		157,829	100.0
Democratic hold			

=== 2022 ===
2022 California State Assembly 25th district election
Primary election
Party	Candidate	Votes	%
Democratic	Ash Kalra (incumbent)	47,942	71.5
Republican	Ted Stroll	19,123	28.5
Total votes		67,065	100.0
General election
Democratic	Ash Kalra (incumbent)	74,546	70.0
Republican	Ted Stroll	31,893	30.0
Total votes		106,439	100.0
Democratic hold			

=== 2020 ===
2020 California State Assembly 25th district election
Primary election
Party	Candidate	Votes	%
Republican	Bob Brunton	19,612	20.8
Democratic	Alex Lee	14,542	15.4
Democratic	Anne Kepner	12,823	13.6
Democratic	Anna Song	11,992	12.7
Democratic	Natasha Gupta	9,778	10.4
Democratic	Carmen Montano	9,672	10.2
Democratic	Anthony Phan	6,780	7.2
Democratic	Roman Reed	5,549	5.9
Democratic	Jim Canova	3,623	3.8
Total votes		94,371	100.0
General election
Democratic	Alex Lee	135,733	70.5
Republican	Bob Brunton	56,775	29.5
Total votes		192,508	100.0
Democratic hold			

=== 2018 ===
2018 California State Assembly 25th district election
Primary election
Party	Candidate	Votes	%
Democratic	Kansen Chu (incumbent)	36,417	51.8
Republican	Bob Brunton	16,391	23.3
Democratic	Carmen Montano	15,345	21.8
Libertarian	Robert Imhoff	2,127	3.0
Total votes		70,280	100.0
General election
Democratic	Kansen Chu (incumbent)	98,612	74.3
Republican	Bob Brunton	34,193	25.7
Total votes		132,805	100.0
Democratic hold			

=== 2016 ===
2016 California State Assembly 25th district election
Primary election
Party	Candidate	Votes	%
Democratic	Kansen Chu (incumbent)	61,980	75.5
Republican	Bob Brunton	20,146	24.5
Total votes		82,126	100.0
General election
Democratic	Kansen Chu (incumbent)	107,821	72.8
Republican	Bob Brunton	40,280	27.2
Total votes		148,101	100.0
Democratic hold			

=== 2014 ===
2014 California State Assembly 25th district election
Primary election
Party	Candidate	Votes	%
Democratic	Kansen Chu	16,672	30.6
Republican	Bob Brunton	12,699	23.3
Democratic	Armando Gomez	9,218	16.9
Democratic	Teresa Cox	9,104	16.7
Democratic	Craig Steckler	6,835	12.5
Total votes		54,528	100.0
General election
Democratic	Kansen Chu	57,718	69.4
Republican	Bob Brunton	25,441	30.6
Total votes		83,159	100.0
Democratic hold			

=== 2012 ===
2012 California State Assembly 25th district election
Primary election
Party	Candidate	Votes	%
Democratic	Bob Wieckowski (incumbent)	22,112	41.6
Republican	ArLyne Diamond	16,077	30.2
Democratic	Pete "Primo" McHugh	14,970	28.2
Total votes		53,159	100.0
General election
Democratic	Bob Wieckowski (incumbent)	93,487	70.5
Republican	ArLyne Diamond	39,159	29.5
Total votes		132,646	100.0
Democratic gain from Republican			

=== 2010 ===
2010 California State Assembly 25th district election
Party	Candidate	Votes	%
Republican	Kristin Olsen	106,715	100.0
Total votes		106,715	100.0
Republican hold			

=== 2008 ===
2008 California State Assembly 25th district election
Party	Candidate	Votes	%
Republican	Tom Berryhill (incumbent)	102,951	59.8
Democratic	Taylor White	69,223	40.2
Total votes		172,174	100.0
Republican hold			

=== 2006 ===
2006 California State Assembly 25th district election
Party	Candidate	Votes	%
Republican	Tom Berryhill	79,594	62.2
Democratic	James Bufford	42,158	33.0
Libertarian	Michael Dell'Orto	6,123	4.8
Total votes		127,875	100.0
Republican hold			

=== 2004 ===
2004 California State Assembly 25th district election
Party	Candidate	Votes	%
Republican	Dave Cogdill (incumbent)	111,336	68.2
Democratic	Bryan Justin Marks	52,006	31.8
Total votes		163,342	100.0
Republican hold			

=== 2002 ===
2002 California State Assembly 25th district election
Party	Candidate	Votes	%
Republican	Dave Cogdill (incumbent)	68,949	62.2
Democratic	E. Denise Smith	42,034	37.8
Total votes		110,983	100.0
Republican hold			

=== 2000 ===
2000 California State Assembly 25th district election
Party	Candidate	Votes	%
Republican	Dave Cogdill (incumbent)	91,478	60.7
Democratic	Stephen F. Rico	55,406	36.8
Libertarian	Jonathan Zwickel	3,838	2.5
Total votes		150,722	100.0
Republican hold			

=== 1998 ===
1998 California State Assembly 25th district election
Party	Candidate	Votes	%
Republican	George House (incumbent)	75,775	61.9
Democratic	Wesley Firch	42,935	35.1
Libertarian	Jonathan Zwickel	2,013	1.6
Reform	Leonard M. Surratt	1,768	1.4
Total votes		122,491	100.0
Republican hold			

=== 1996 ===
1996 California State Assembly 25th district election
Party	Candidate	Votes	%
Republican	George House (incumbent)	82,588	58.5
Democratic	Ed Elliott	54,033	38.3
Libertarian	Ronald C. A. Payne	4,450	3.2
Total votes		141,071	100.0
Republican hold			

=== 1994 ===
1994 California State Assembly 25th district election
Party	Candidate	Votes	%
Republican	George House	66,910	54.3
Democratic	Margaret Snyder (incumbent)	52,962	43.0
Libertarian	Al Segalla	3,356	2.7
Total votes		123,228	100.0
Republican gain from Democratic			

=== 1992 ===
1992 California State Assembly 25th district election
Party	Candidate	Votes	%
Democratic	Margaret E. Snyder	78,251	51.5
Republican	Barbara Keating-Edh	73,805	48.5
Total votes		152,056	100.0
Democratic hold			

=== 1990 ===
1990 California State Assembly 25th district election
Party	Candidate	Votes	%
Democratic	Rusty Areias (incumbent)	52,725	63.4
Republican	Ben Gilmore	26,454	31.8
Libertarian	Mark Hinkle	3,953	4.8
Total votes		83,132	100.0
Democratic hold			

== See also ==
- California State Assembly
- California State Assembly districts
- Districts in California
