= George House (California politician) =

American politician

George R. House Jr.

Member of the California State Assembly from the 25th district
- In office December 5, 1994 - November 30, 2000
- Preceded by: Margaret Snyder
- Succeeded by: Dave Cogdill

Personal details
- Born: November 20, 1929 Indianola, Oklahoma
- Died: July 14, 2016 (aged 86) Modesto, California
- Party: Republican
- Spouse: Edna
- Children: 5

George Rolland House II (November 20, 1929 – July 14, 2016) was a Republican Assemblymember from California's 25th State Assembly district from 1994 until he was term limited in 2000.

== Pre-Assembly career ==
Prior to serving in the Assembly, House was an almond farmer from Hughson, CA. He served two years with the Modesto, CA police department before becoming a CHP officer and commander for thirty years. He was also a Stanislaus County Juvenile Traffic Court hearing officer. He also served on the Hughson school board and was an active Rotarian.

== 1992 election ==
House ran for the newly created 25th Assembly district in 1992; however, he lost the primary to Barbara Keating-Edh who ended up losing to Margaret Snyder. He came in 4th place with just eleven percent of the vote.

== 1994 election ==
House ran for Assembly again in 1994. Although initially considered a weak candidate, he defeated Democratic incumbent Margaret Snyder in a heavily Republican year that saw the GOP take control of the California State Assembly for the first time since 1970.

== The 25th District ==
When House represented the seat from 1994 until 2000, it included half of Stanislaus County, all of Mariposa County and Tuolumne County. It also included most of Madera County and a small part of Fresno County.

== Proposition 34 ==
House was a major opponent of Proposition 34 in 2000 which stated that 34% of the total annual state lottery revenues shall be allocated to benefit public education. However, it passed with 53% of the vote.

== 2002 Congressional Election ==
House put a bid in for California's 18th Congressional District in 2002 in order to face troubled incumbent Gary Condit; however, he withdrew from the race prior to the election and still received 12.8% of the vote in the primary against then State Senator Dick Monteith who now serves as a Stanislaus County supervisor.

== Electoral history ==
Member, California State Assembly: 1995-2001
Year	Office	Democrat	Votes	Pct	Republican	Votes	Pct
1992	California State Assembly; District 25	Mike Kirros 16% Patrick O'Rourke 13% Margaret Snyder 59%	78,251	51.5%	George House 11% Barbara Keating-Edh 43% Bill Mattos 23% Norman Tergeson 16%	73,805	48.5%
1994	California State Assembly; District 25	Margaret Snyder	52,962	43%	George House	66,910	54.3%
1996	California State Assembly; District 37	Ed Elliott	54,033	38.3%	George House	82,558	58.5%
1998	California State Assembly; District 37	Wesley Firch	42,935	35.1%	George House	75,775	61.9%
2002	U.S. House of Representatives; District 18	Dennis Cardoza 53.1% Gary Condit* 38.7%	53,621	51%	George House 12.8% Dick Monteith 48.9%	45,960	43.7%

Political offices
Preceded by Margaret Snyder	California State Assemblymember, 25th district 1994–2000	Succeeded by Dave Cogdill
