= Louis Francis =

American politician (1923–1968)

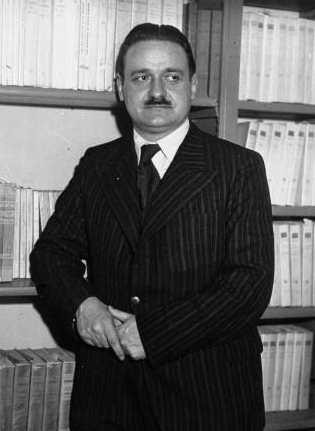
- Louis Francis

Member of the California State Assembly from the 25th district
- In office June 27, 1956 - January 7, 1963
- Preceded by: Daniel J. Creedon
- Succeeded by: William F. Stanton

Personal details
- Born: May 24, 1923 Oakland, California
- Died: March 9, 1968 (aged 44)
- Party: Republican
- Spouse: Alice R. Corcoran (M. 1933)
- Children: 4

Military service
- Branch/service: United States Navy
- Battles/wars: World War II

Louis Patrick Francis (May 24, 1923 - March 9, 1968) served in the California State Assembly for the 25th district. During World War II he served in the United States Navy.

Pinole, California has a park named for Louis Francis.
