= Anna Song (politician) =

American politician

Member of the Santa Clara County School Board
- In office 2000–2020
- Succeeded by: Victoria Chon

Personal details
- Born: South Korea
- Education: Franciscan University of Steubenville (BA)

Anna E. Song is a South Korean-born American politician who served on the Santa Clara County School Board for twenty years. She is California's first female South Korean-born elected official.

== Political career ==
Song was first elected to the Santa Clara County School Board in 2000, becoming the first Korean American elected in Santa Clara County. Song was elected as board president in 2000, and was re-elected to a second four-year Board in 2004. During her reelection to the Board in 2008, Song prevailed with 53.73% of the vote against Milpitas City Councilwoman Carmen Montano. Song also won re-election in 2012 against Berryessa School Board member David Neighbors — earning 58% of the vote despite more than a quarter million dollars ($250,000) spent against her in the campaign. Anna Song was awarded the John F. Kennedy, Jr. Award from the California Democratic Party in 2002.

Song ran in the 2008 primary for the California's 22nd State Assembly district.

=== 2020 California Assembly run ===
On May 12, 2019, Song announced that she would run for the California's 25th State Assembly district in 2020. She ran to succeed incumbent Kansen Chu, who was not seeking reelection. She was defeated in the March 3 primary. That same year, she was defeated in her reelection bid for Santa Clara County School Board by Victoria Chon.

== Personal life ==
Song, a resident of Santa Clara, California, is the mother of two sons. Song holds a BA from the Franciscan University of Steubenville and has completed graduate courses at the Franciscan School of Theology in Berkeley, California.
