= Margaret Snyder =

American politician

Margaret E. Snyder

Member of the California State Assembly from the 25th district
- In office December 7, 1992 - November 30, 1994
- Preceded by: Rusty Areias
- Succeeded by: George House

Personal details
- Born: February 25, 1940 Elizabethton, Tennessee
- Died: December 15, 2010 (aged 70) Hughson, California
- Party: Democratic
- Spouse: Melvin (m.1958)
- Children: 3

Margaret E. Snyder (February 25, 1940 - December 15, 2010) was an American politician from California and a member of the Democratic Party. A former legal secretary and community volunteer, she served on the Modesto School Board from 1985 until 1992, when she won election to the newly created 25th district in the California State Assembly.

She entered the legislature with a relatively liberal record from her years on the school board. She quickly cultivated her conservative Central Valley district, however, as exemplified by her 100 percent rating from the NRA. Nevertheless, Snyder was unable to win reelection in 1994, when Republicans enjoyed huge wins across the country. She lost to Republican George House, a retired CHP commander and almond farmer, who at the time was considered a weak candidate.

== Electoral history ==
Member, California State Assembly: 1993-95
Year	Office	Democrat	Votes	Pct	Republican	Votes	Pct
1992	California State Assembly; District 25	Mike Kirros 16% Patrick O'Rourke 13% Margaret Snyder 59%	78,251	51.5%	George House 11% Barbara Keating-Edh 43% Bill Mattos 23% Norman Tergeson 16%	73,805	48.5%
1994	California State Assembly; District 25	Margaret Snyder	52,962	43%	George House	66,910	54.3%

Political offices
Preceded by newly created	California State Assembly, 25th District; 1992-1994	Succeeded by George House
