= Fearon Publishers =

- Company type: Publishing
- Genre: Published media
- Headquarters: Belmont, California
- Products: Written works

Fearon Publishers is an American publishing company based in Belmont, California. This publishing company mainly deals with parenting and education books.
