= Jim Jones in popular culture =

Overview of popular cultural depictions of Jim Jones

Jim Jones was a cult leader who on November 18, 1978, orchestrated the mass murder suicide of 909 members of his commune in Jonestown, Guyana. Since the events of the Jonestown Massacre, a massive amount of literature and study has been produced on the subject. Numerous documentaries, films, books, poetry, music and art have covered or been inspired by the events of Jonestown. Jim Jones and the events at Jonestown has had a defining influence on society's perception of cults. The widely known expression "Drinking the Kool-Aid" originated in the events at Jonestown, although the specific beverage used at the massacre was Flavor Aid rather than Kool-Aid.

== Documentaries ==
- Jonestown: Mystery of a Massacre (1998)
- Jonestown: The Life and Death of Peoples Temple (2006)
- Jonestown: Paradise Lost (2007)
- CNN Presents: Escape From Jonestown (2008)
- Seconds from Disaster, episode (season 6, episode 1) "Jonestown Cult Suicide" (2012)
- Witness to Jonestown (2013)
- Jonestown: The Women Behind the Massacre (2018)
- Jonestown: Terror in the Jungle (2018)
- 605 Adults 304 Children (2019), short documentary filmed entirely by the Peoples Temple at Jonestown

== Television ==
- Guyana Tragedy: The Story of Jim Jones (1980), fact-based miniseries. Powers Boothe won an Emmy for his portrayal of Jones.
- American Horror Story: Cult (2017)
- Jonestown: Terror in the Jungle (2018), a documentary produced for Sundance TV.
- Very Scary People (Season 1, Episode 6) "Jim Jones: Unholy Massacre" (2019)
- Corrupt Crimes (Season 1, Episode 79) "Deadly Religion" (2016)
- Murder Made Me Famous (Season 3, Episode 5) "Jim Jones" (2017)

== Film ==
- Guyana: Crime of the Century a.k.a. Guyana: Cult of the Damned (1979), fictionalized exploitation film (depicted here as 'Reverend James Johnson')
- Cut and Run (1985), an exploitation thriller film depicting a cult-like army led by a follower of Jim Jones
- The Sacrament (2013), a found-footage horror film (depicted here simply as 'Father'; in addition, Jonestown has been renamed 'Eden Parish')
- Jonestown (2013), an independent short film which dramatizes the last 24 hours in the lives of Jones (played here by Leandro Cano) and The Peoples Temple Church through the eyes of a reporter.
- The Jonestown Haunting (2020)
- Two biopics are in the works about Jones and Jonestown, one, Jim Jones, starring Leonardo DiCaprio as Jones, and another, titled White Night, based on Deborah Layton's memoir Seductive Poison, starring Joseph Gordon-Levitt as Jones and Chloë Grace Moretz as Layton.

== Fiction literature ==
- Jonestown, by Wilson Harris. London: Faber and Faber, 1996.
- We Agreed to Meet Just Here, by Scott Blackwood. Kalamazoo, Michigan: West Michigan University Press, 2009.
- Children of Paradise, by Fred D'Aguiar. New York: HarperCollins, 2014.
- Before White Night, by Joseph Hartmann. Richmond, Virginia: Belle Isle Books, 2014.
- White Nights, Black Paradise, by Sikivu Hutchinson. Infidel Books, 2015.
- Beautiful Revolutionary, by Laura Elizabeth Woollett. London: Scribe. 2018.

== Music ==
- "Brother Jonesie" by The Citations from their album Taking a Cruise with The Citations (1980)
- "Ballad of Jim Jones" by The Brian Jonestown Massacre from their album Thank God for Mental Illness (1996)
- "Carnage in the Temple of the Damned" by Deicide from their album Deicide (1990)
- "Diäb Soulé" by Acid Bath from their album Paegan Terrorism Tactics (1996)
- "Guyana (Cult of the Damned)" by Manowar from their album Sign of the Hammer (1984)
- "Hypnotized" by Heathen from their album Victims of Deception (1991)
- "Jimmie Jones" by The Vapors from their album Magnets (1981)
- "Jonestown" by The Acacia Strain, from their album Wormwood (2010)
- "Jonestown" by Concrete Blonde, from their album Mexican Moon (1993)
- "Jonestown" by Evan Williams, at the University of Cincinnati's College-Conservatory of Music (2015)
- "Jonestown" by Frank Zappa, from his album Boulez Conducts Zappa: The Perfect Stranger (1984)
- "Jonestown" by Information Society, from the album _hello world (2014)
- "Extraordinary Popular Delusions And The Madness Of Crowds" by Information Society, from the album ODDfellows (2021) samples various recordings of Jim Jones.
- "Koolaid" by Accept, from their album The Rise of Chaos (2017)
- "Mindless Boogie" by Hot Chocolate, from their album Going Through The Motions (1979)
- "Jonestown (Interlude)" by Post Malone, from his album Beerbongs & Bentleys (2018)
- "Last Call in Jonestown" by Polkadot Cadaver, from their album Last Call in Jonestown (2013)
- "Requiem" by Lamb of God, from their album Sacrament (2006)
- "Reverend" by Church of Misery, from their album Early Works Compilation (2011)
- "Guyana Punch" by The Judy's, from their album Washarama (1981)
- "Jim Jones" by SKYND from their EP Chapter 2 (2019)
- "Pretty Picture" by The Used from their album The Canyon (2017) uses audio samples of the last sermon at Jonestown
- "Go Outside" by The Cults from their album Cults (2011) opens with a sample of one of his speeches.
- "Jim Jones (Cowards, Pt. 2)" by Chevelle from their album Bright as Blasphemy (2025).
- "Jim Jones" by Dirt Poor Robins from their album The Last Days of Leviathan (2010)

== Poetry ==
- Bill of Rights, by Fred D'Aguiar. London: Chatto & Windus, 1998.
- The Jonestown Arcane, by Jack Hirschman. Los Angeles: Parentheses Writing Series, 1991.
- Jonestown Lullaby, by Teri Buford O'Shea. Bloomington, IN: iUniverse, 2011.
- Jonestown and Other Madness, by Pat Parker. Ithaca, NY: Firebrand Books, 1985.
- I. at Jonestown, by Lucille Clifton. Next. Brockport: BOA, 1989.

== Theater ==
- The Peoples Temple. Written by Leigh Fondakowski, with Greg Pierotti, Stephen Wangh, and Margo Hall. Premiered in 2005

== See also ==
- Jonestown
- Peoples Temple
- Drinking the Kool-Aid
- Messiah complex
- Doomsday Cult

== Sources ==
- Chidester, David (2004). Salvation and Suicide: Jim Jones, the People's Temple and Jonestown (Religion in North America) (2nd ed.). Indiana University Press. ISBN 978-0253216328.
