= Mary Pearl Willis Foundation =

U.S charitable foundation

The Mary Pearl Willis Foundation was established in 2007 by Lela Howard. It provides financial assistance to low income families with burial needs, strategies that enforce cemetery codes and ethics, and support for women and gender equality through its link with non-profit and women organizations.

Howard's aunt Mary Pearl Willis died in the Jonestown, Guyana murder-suicide on November 18, 1978. To mark the 30th anniversary of the deaths, a memorial listing the names of all identified victims, which includes Congressman Leo Ryan, Robert Brown (NBC camera man), Don Harris (NBC reporter) and Greg Robinson (San Francisco Examiner photographer) was unveiled at Evergreen Cemetery in Oakland, California.

In conjunction with the memorial, Mayors Timothy Davlin, Gerald Jennings, James Mayo (Monroe, La, Quachita Parish), Gavin Newsom, Antonio Villaraigosa, Senators Dianne Feinstein, Neil Riser, Leland Yee and Los Angeles City Council Members declared by Proclamations, State Legislatures and Certificates of Recognition November 18, 2008 "A Day of Remembrance." In addition, Congress read into record a memorial in memory of the victims.

The foundation works to increase awareness of life insurance and pre-need arrangements.

== See also ==
- Jonestown: The Life and Death of Peoples Temple, a 2006 documentary film
- Jonestown: Paradise Lost, a 2007 History Channel Documentary
