= Timothy Stoen =

American attorney (born 1938)

- Born: Timothy Oliver Stoen; January 16, 1938 (age 88); Milwaukee, Wisconsin, U.S.
- Occupation: Lawyer
- Known for: Peoples Temple involvement
- Children: 1

Timothy Oliver Stoen (born January 16, 1938) is an American attorney best known for his central role as a member of the Peoples Temple, and as an opponent of the group during a multi-year custody battle over his six-year-old son, John. The custody battle triggered a chain of events which led to U.S. Representative Leo Ryan's investigation into the Temple's remote settlement of Jonestown in northern Guyana, which became internationally notorious in 1978 after 918 people – including Stoen's son – died in the settlement and on a nearby airstrip. Stoen continued to work as a deputy district attorney in Mendocino County, California, where he was assigned to the District Attorney's Fort Bragg office. Stoen later joined the Mendocino County Public Defenders. He is now in the private practice of law.

== Early life ==
Timothy Stoen was born in Milwaukee, Wisconsin, the child of religious middle-class parents from Littleton, Colorado. Throughout high school and college he was a scholar, athlete and devout Christian. Stoen graduated from Wheaton College with a B.A. in political science. He graduated from Stanford Law School in 1964 and was admitted to the California bar in 1965.

Stoen worked for a year in an Oakland real estate office before joining the Mendocino County District Attorney's Office in Ukiah as a deputy district attorney. In 1967, Stoen left this position with the intention of doing work for flower children and similar hippie groups in San Francisco's Haight-Ashbury district, and also worked as a staff attorney for the Legal Aid Society of Alameda County. Though he represented black militants and supported an ecological platform, he briefly considered running for office as a Republican.

In 1970, Stoen married Grace Lucy Grech, whom he had met at a march at the San Francisco Civic Center against overpopulation and pollution. Their son, John Victor Stoen, was born on January 25, 1972.

== Temple beginnings ==
=== Introduction to Peoples Temple ===
Some of the Peoples Temple's California Locations

Stoen first encountered the Peoples Temple when it was suggested that he ask the group to help renovate the Mendocino County legal aid offices. Two dozen Temple volunteers showed up the following Sunday, and Stoen began sending people to the Temple for drug and marriage counseling. He became impressed with the purported character and good deeds of the Temple's leader, Reverend Jim Jones, especially when he saw Jones scrubbing toilets in the Temple's Ukiah headquarters. By the end of 1969, when violence erupted in Berkeley over People's Park and Third World students' rights, Stoen began to integrate his personal life with the Temple.

In 1970, Stoen moved to the Temple's headquarters, where he worked as a deputy district attorney and head of Mendocino County's civil division. He began providing legal aid for the Temple and politically converted to the Temple's socialist ideology.

== San Francisco Assistant District Attorney ==
Despite still referring to its Ukiah facility as its "mother church", the Peoples Temple moved its headquarters to San Francisco around 1972. Following the 1975 mayoral election, former San Francisco District Attorney Joseph Freitas named Stoen to lead a special unit to investigate election fraud charges. Shortly thereafter, Freitas hired Stoen as an assistant district attorney in the consumer frauds division.

Stoen found no evidence of election fraud, but Temple members later alleged that the Temple arranged for "busloads" of members to be transported from Redwood Valley to San Francisco to vote in that election under threats of physical violence. When asked how Jones could know for whom they voted, one member responded, "You don't understand, we wanted to do what he told us to." Stoen later claimed that he was not aware at the time of election fraud, despite being in charge of the special unit investigating that specific crime, but that it could have happened without his knowledge because, "Jim Jones kept a lot of things from me."

== Defection from the Peoples Temple ==
On February 6, 1972, just two weeks after his son John was born, Stoen signed an affidavit in which he stated that Jones was the child's biological father. The single-page document eventually became the most important piece of paper in the Temple's history. Stoen's affidavit not only seemed to contradict his putative paternity, but also "bound the child to Jones and the church for life." In the years to follow, Jones would cite the affidavit countless times to demonstrate his paternity of the child, to denigrate Grace's worthiness to be a mother, and to dismiss Stoen's claims of custody rights.

Grace, meanwhile, had grown to greatly dislike the Temple. Not only had she been forced to give up John by signing the affidavit, but she had also been berated and threatened – sometimes by Jones himself – in Temple meetings for denying Jones' paternity of the child, watched the child be publicly paddled, listened to Jones portray Stoen as a homosexual, and witnessed the beating of a 40-year-old woman who had claimed the Temple turned members into robots. Grace and Temple member Walter "Smitty" Jones (no relation to Jim Jones) agreed to leave together. In July 1976, Grace and Smitty fled to Lake Tahoe.

Grace was unable to take John with her; he had already been sent to the Temple's Jonestown settlement in Guyana, and she did not want to put his life in jeopardy along with hers. Nevertheless, Grace began to fight for custody almost immediately after her defection. In February 1977, Grace threatened to divorce Stoen. Fearing that possible legal action against Stoen would make the custody dispute public, Jones sent him to Jonestown. Stoen quit his job as assistant district attorney and began working in Guyana, both at Jonestown and at the Temple's headquarters in the capital of Georgetown. However, distrustful Temple members were secretly spying on Stoen and examining the contents of his briefcase. Within a year, Stoen also left the Temple, returned to San Francisco, and joined Grace's custody battle. Stoen subsequently became the chief antagonist to Jones, who encouraged Jonestown residents to write detailed, humiliating fantasies about murdering Stoen.

== Battling the Temple ==
In July 1977, Jones moved several hundred Temple members to Jonestown, on the same night that an editor at New West magazine read Jones a pending article, written by Marshall Kilduff, detailing allegations of abuse by former Temple members. Two months later, a Georgetown court ordered the Temple to show cause why a final order should not be issued compelling the return of John to his mother. A few days later, the same court issued a second order for Jones' arrest.

In fear of being held in contempt of the court orders, and in an attempt to further manipulate his followers, Jones staged a false sniper attack on himself and began a series of "White Night" rallies, called the "Six Day Siege", where he told Temple members about attacks from outsiders and had members surround Jonestown with guns and machetes. Angela Davis and Huey Newton communicated via radio-telephone to the Jonestown crowd, urging them to hold strong against the "conspiracy." Jones made radio broadcasts stating "we will die unless we are granted freedom from harassment and asylum." Guyanese Deputy Prime Minister Ptolemy Reid finally assured Jones' wife Marceline that Guyana Defence Force would not invade Jonestown. A court clerk refused to sign the arrest warrant for Jones, and there was talk of interference in the legal process by the Guyanese government.

After this initial round of the Stoen custody dispute, Jones directed Temple members to write to over a dozen foreign governments inquiring about their immigration policies in the event that they had to flee Guyana. He also wrote the U.S. State Department inquiring about North Korea and Albania.

=== Concerned Relatives ===
Meanwhile, in San Francisco, the Stoens and other relatives of Jonestown members began attending meetings at the home of Jeannie Mills. Calling themselves the "Concerned Relatives", the group began sharing details of their grievances with the Temple, interviewed Temple defectors, and reviewed shortwave radio transcripts of communications between Jonestown and the Temple's San Francisco headquarters. Temple surveillance teams, aware of these meetings, checked licence plates in front of Mills' house to determine the identity of their "enemies." Stoen's addition to the group was vital because of his knowledge of Temple operations, his letter-writing campaigns to the Secretary of State and the Guyanese government, and his trips to Washington, D.C. to lobby for a federal investigation. Stoen became the Concerned Relatives' primary legal representative and filed four court actions against the Temple and its leadership on November 18, 1978, on the group's behalf.

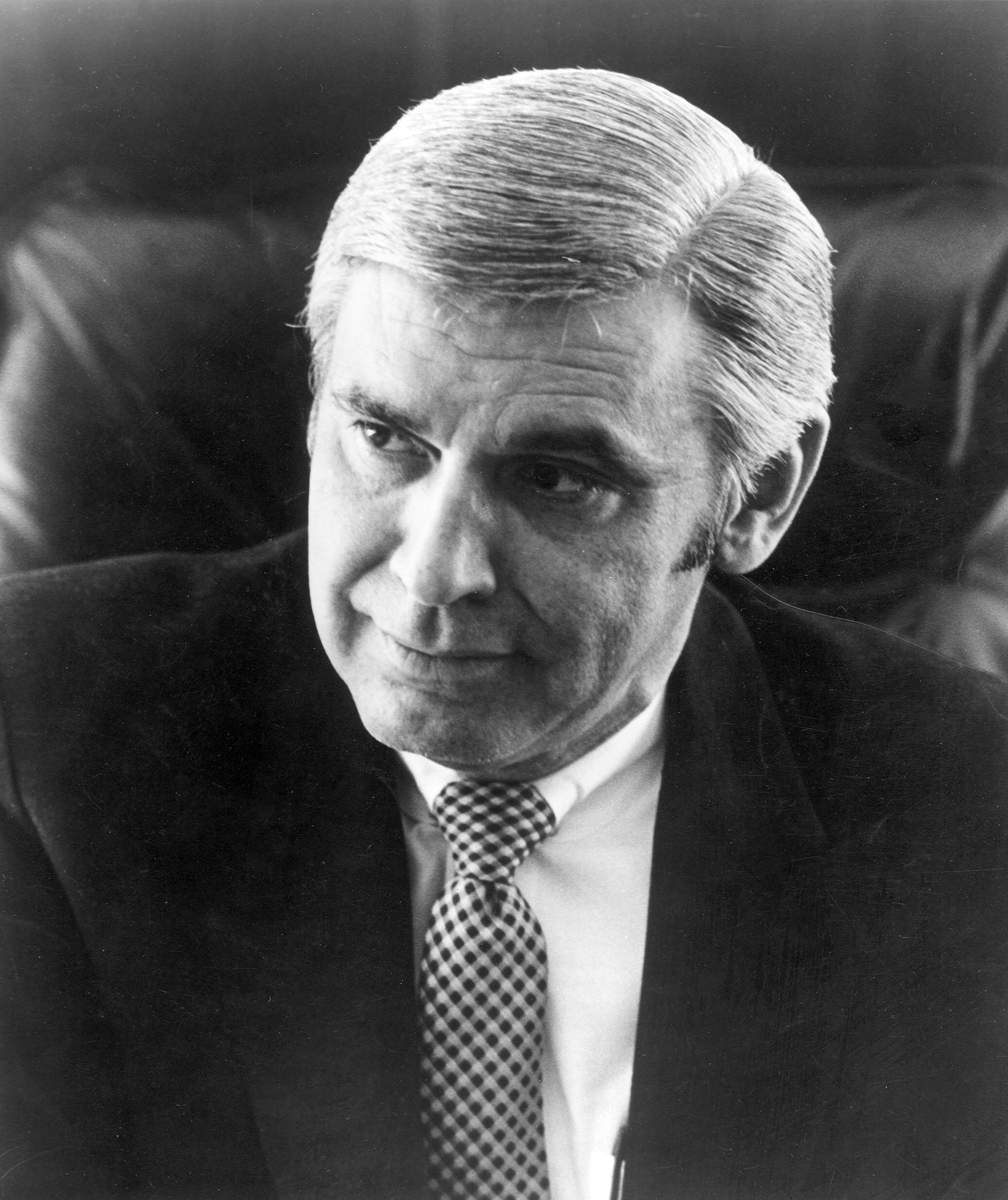
Congressman Leo Ryan

In November 1977, an order was issued in a San Francisco court granting custody of John to his mother, Grace. The court order meant that Jones could not return to the U.S. without facing contempt proceedings for failing to turn over the child; it also meant Jones could never let the child leave Jonestown.

In January 1978, Stoen travelled to Georgetown in an unsuccessful bid to take custody of the child. A Guyanese judge recused himself from the case because his life had been threatened, and the new judge had to restart the process from the beginning. A Guyanese official approached Stoen and told him to leave immediately one week before his visa expired. While at the airport, three Temple members surrounded Stoen and threatened his life unless he dropped his legal action. Although Stoen wanted to travel to Jonestown to retrieve John, he thought "if I went back, I thought I would probably be a corpse within thirty days."

After Stoen returned to Washington in January 1978, he visited with nine members of Congress, including U.S. Representative Leo Ryan of California. The Temple, likewise, sent members to visit eight of the nine Congressman in order to discredit Stoen. Stoen also wrote a white paper to Congress that stated how Jones was illegally holding his son. The white paper claimed that any action by the Guyanese military to retrieve the child could result in harm to John or others, and insisted that members of Congress write Guyanese Prime Minister Forbes Burnham to take action. Ryan wrote such a letter on Stoen's behalf. Several other congressmen also wrote to Burnham about Stoen's concerns.

At the end of January 1978, Stoen and fellow Concerned Relative Steven Katsaris met State Department officials. They insisted that Jones' mental condition was deteriorating and that he was suffering from "paranoid megalomania". Stoen urged the State Department to request officially that Guyana "speedily enforce" the custody order that the Stoens had won.

=== Media spotlight ===
Feeling the international pressure, on February 17, 1978, Jones submitted to an interview with reporter Tim Reiterman of the San Francisco Examiner via radio-telephone. Reiterman's story about the Stoen custody battle, appearing in the Examiner's February 18 preview edition of that Sunday's paper, undermined Jones' credibility. Temple attorneys immediately sent a letter to the Examiner threatening litigation, as well as the 1972 affidavit which named Jones as the father of Stoen's son. Columnist Herb Caen, a supporter of the Temple, reprinted the affidavit in the San Francisco Chronicle.

The next day, February 19, Harvey Milk, a member of the San Francisco Board of Supervisors, wrote a letter to U.S. President Jimmy Carter supporting Jones. The Temple had assisted Milk's 1976 election race to become a California State assembly member, and Milk had visited and spoken at Temple rallies. In the letter to President Carter, Milk wrote "Rev. Jones is widely known in the minority communities and elsewhere as a man of the highest character... Timothy and Grace Stoen [are] the parties attempting to damage Rev. Jones reputation". Milk also wrote "[i]t is outrageous that Timothy Stoen could even think of flaunting this situation in front of Congressman with apparent bold-faced lies." The letter demanded that "the actions of Mr. Stoen need to be brought to a halt."

=== Affidavits and lawsuits ===
On March 14, 1978, Temple member Pam Moten sent an open letter to Congress suggesting that members of the Concerned Relatives group were conspiring with the Federal Communications Commission (FCC) and the Internal Revenue Service (IRS) against the group, stating that "radical Trotskyite elements which defected from our organization when we refused to follow their violent course have been orchestrating a campaign against us." Moten's letter suggested that Soviet overtures to assist the Temple might embarrass the U.S.: "[i]n fact, several overtures have been made from Russia, which sees our current harassment as a form of political persecution. We do not want to take assistance from any people nor do we want to become an international issue."

On April 11, the Concerned Relatives distributed a packet of documents, including letters and affidavits that they titled an "Accusation of Human Rights Violations by Rev. James Warren Jones" to the Peoples Temple, members of the press and members of Congress. The accusations chronicled mistreatment in Jonestown, which it portrayed as an armed encampment, and described hard labor, passport confiscation and statements about Jones' speeches speaking of suicide and conspiracies against the Temple. On May 10, the Temple retorted with their own "Open Statement" alleging the Concerned Relatives were part of a massive conspiracy and attacking the "so called Free Enterprise system" and "racist ... corporate power." It further portrayed the group as lying and attempting to "destroy us."

In June 1978, Deborah Layton and her attorney drafted a further affidavit detailing alleged crimes by the Temple and substandard living conditions in Jonestown. Stoen and other Concerned Relatives had monitored the Temple's shortwave radio broadcasts, and Stoen filed complaints with the FCC in the autumn of 1977 citing the Temple for breaching regulations. In later affidavits and lawsuits filed in 1978, Stoen cited communications the group had intercepted through their monitoring.

Stoen acted as the lawyer in three different lawsuits filed in May and June 1978 on behalf of members of the Concerned Relatives against Jones and other Temple members, collectively seeking over $56 million in damages. On July 10, 1978, the Temple sued Stoen for $150 million, charging that Stoen violated his attorney-client relationship by using privileged information in his suits against the Temple. The suit alleged that Stoen was attempting to "harass and oppress" his former client and sought to enjoin Stoen from soliciting former members as clients in suits against the Temple.

== Final trip ==
By October 1978, all of the defectors had allied with Stoen and the Concerned Relatives. On October 3, Stoen told the State Department that he would retrieve his son John from Jonestown by force if necessary. Three days later he sent a telegram reiterating the threat and warning of the danger of mass suicide at the settlement.

As pressure grew, the Temple learned that Stoen would accompany an investigatory trip by Rep. Ryan to Guyana. On November 15, 1978, both Grace and Tim Stoen traveled with the Ryan delegation to Georgetown. However, they were not permitted to accompany the delegation on its trip to Jonestown on November 17. While the Stoens remained in Georgetown, the Ryan delegation was attacked on November 18 at an airstrip in Port Kaituma, near Jonestown. Ryan and four others were killed by Temple members wielding rifles and shotguns, while several others were injured.

Stoen encountered Jones' son Stephan in his Georgetown hotel, neither knowing that Jones was conducting a mass murder-suicide two hundred miles away. As they spoke, 909 inhabitants of Jonestown, 276 of them children, died of apparent cyanide poisoning, mostly in and around the settlement's central pavilion. An audio recording of Jones, speaking to his followers during the massacre, mentions Stoen: Jones stated:

What we'd like to get are the people that caused this stuff, and some – if some people here are p – are prepared and know how to do that, to go in town and get Timothy Stoen, but there's no plane. There's no plane. You can't catch a plane in time. He's responsible for it. He brought these people to us. He and [Jeannie Mills]. The people in San Francisco will not – not be idle over this. They'll not take our death in vain, you know. ...

It's suicide. Plenty have done it. Stoen has done it. But somebody ought to live. Somebody – Can they talk to – and I've talked to San Francisco – see that Stoen does not get by with this infamy – with this infamy. He has done the thing he wanted to do. Have us destroyed. ...

Tim Stoen has nobody else to hate. He has nobody else to hate. Then he'll destroy himself.

— Jim Jones on the final "death tape"

Jones also discussed whether the Temple should include Stoen among the names of those committing "revolutionary suicide", and whether to include children in the plan:

do you think I'd put John's life above others? If I put John's life above others, I wouldn't be standing with Ujara [nickname of Don Sly, a Temple member who attempted to stab Rep. Ryan]. I'd send John out – out, and he could go out on the driveway tonight. ... I know, but he's no – he's no different to me than any of these children here. He's just one of my children. I don't prefer one above another. I don't prefer him above Ujara. I can't do that. I can't separate myself from your actions or his actions.

— Jim Jones on the final "death tape"

Six-year-old John Stoen was found poisoned in Jim Jones' cabin at Jonestown. The mass murder-suicide was the greatest single loss of American civilian life in a non-natural disaster until September 11, 2001.

== Career after Jonestown ==
From 1980 to 1984, Stoen was corporate counsel for Pacific Energy & Minerals, Ltd. For some time thereafter, he worked at a private practice. In 1998, Stoen ran for the California State Senate and lost in the Democratic primary, receiving 34.5% of the vote. On his political philosophy page, he stated:

Life-experience education as the adversary of Jim Jones and the person Jones blamed for his downfall ("Tim Stoen is responsible for this....We win when we go down"), learning at the core of my being the truth of Lord Acton's dictum that "Power tends to corrupt and absolute power corrupts absolutely." One who has experienced the abuse of power has learned a profound lesson in wisdom and can more likely be trusted with power.

Later, Stoen returned to work for the district attorney's offices in Humboldt and Mendocino counties. Former Mendocino County District Attorney Norm Vroman, who hired Stoen back to the Ukiah office in 2000, stated "frankly, I've never seen him lose a case." He remains an active member of the California bar into his late 80s.
