= Jonestown: Paradise Lost =

2007 documentary television film

- Written by: Jason Sherman
- Directed by: Tim Wolochatiuk
- Narrated by: Ted Biggs
- Theme music composer: Simon Cloquet
- Countries of origin: Canada; France; South Africa
- Original language: English

Production
- Producers: Catherine Berthillier; Greta Knutzen
- Cinematography: Gilles Arnaud
- Editor: Stephan Talneau
- Running time: 100 minutes
- Production companies: Film Afrika Worldwide; Cineflix Productions

Original release
- Network: History Channel
- Release: January 15, 2007

Jonestown: Paradise Lost is a 2007 documentary television film on the History Channel about the final days of Jonestown, the Peoples Temple, and Jim Jones. From eyewitness and survivor accounts, the program recreates the last week before the mass murder-suicide on November 18, 1978.

== Summary ==
The film documents the final days of the Peoples Temple at Jonestown, Guyana. Interspersed with interviews from survivors, dramatic recreations of the events show how Reverend Jim Jones becomes increasingly paranoid and erratic as pressures build on him, both inside the compound and from the United States. When Congressman Leo Ryan insists on visiting, Jones alternates between reluctant acceptance and refusal. Ultimately, Jones allows Ryan, several journalists, and the Concerned Relatives representatives to visit the compound. Jones coaches the Peoples Temple members on what to say, but is surprised by a series of defections. Jones orders the deaths of all involved and forces the members of the Temple to commit mass suicide. Hyacinth Thrash, an elderly member, hides and survives. Sherwin Harris, who never visited the compound itself, survives, but his estranged ex-wife, Sharon, and daughter, Lianne, both commit suicide. Vernon Gosney and Tim Reiterman escape the assassination of Ryan, but both are shot and wounded by the assassins. Stephan Jones, Jim Jones' son, was not at the compound during the massacre.

== Cast ==
- Ted Biggs (narrator)

=== Interviews ===
- Stephan Jones, Jim Jones' son
- Vernon Gosney, former Peoples Temple member
- Tim Reiterman, journalist and author who was shot in Guyana
- Sherwin Harris, a member of the Concerned Relatives

=== Dramatic recreations ===
- Rick Roberts as Jim Jones
- Quentin Krog as Stephan Jones
- Brendan Murray as Vernon Gosney
- Alon Nashman as Sherwin Harris
- Greg Ellwand as Congressman Leo Ryan
- Kevin Otto as Tim Reiterman
- Roxanne Blaise as Monica Bagby
- Cindi Sampson as Christine Miller
- Victoria Bartlett as Marceline Jones
- Nicole Crozier as Liane Harris
- Dean Slater as Don Harris
- Adrienne Pearce as Sharon Amos
- Patrick Lyster as Charles Garry
- Olive Cele as Hyacinth Thrash

== Release ==
Jonestown: Paradise Lost aired on the History Channel on January 15, 2007. It was then shown at the Hot Docs Canadian International Documentary Festival on March 5, 2007, followed by its Canadian TV premiere on VisionTV on March 13, 2007.

== Reception ==
Ginia Bellafante of The New York Times wrote that the film "methodically clocks through the cult's final days", but Stephan Jones, Jim Jones' son, is "mesmerizing to watch". Bellafante faults the documentary for not interviewing Stephan further. Stephan has said that he has no intention of watching the documentary.
