= Guyana Tragedy: The Story of Jim Jones =

1980 American television film

- DVD cover
- Based on: Guyana Massacre: The Eyewitness Account by Charles A. Krause
- Teleplay by: Ernest Tidyman
- Directed by: William A. Graham
- Starring: Powers Boothe; Ned Beatty; LeVar Burton; Colleen Dewhurst; James Earl Jones; Randy Quaid
- Music by: Elmer Bernstein
- Country of origin: United States
- Original language: English
- No. of episodes: 2

Production
- Executive producer: Frank Konigsberg
- Producers: Ernest Tidyman; Sam Manners
- Cinematography: Gil Hubbs
- Editors: Aaron Stell; Tony de Zarraga
- Running time: 192 minutes
- Production company: The Konigsberg Company

Original release
- Network: CBS
- Release: April 15 – April 16, 1980

Guyana Tragedy: The Story of Jim Jones is a 1980 American biographical drama television film directed by William A. Graham from a teleplay by Ernest Tidyman, based on the 1978 book Guyana Massacre: The Eyewitness Account by Charles A. Krause. It stars Powers Boothe in the title role, with Ned Beatty, LeVar Burton, Colleen Dewhurst, James Earl Jones, and Randy Quaid in supporting roles. It is a dramatization of the life of murderous cult leader Jim Jones, who led a mass murder of his Peoples Temple followers in Jonestown, Guyana.

The film was originally broadcast in two parts on CBS on April 15 and 16, 1980. It received positive reviews from critics, who particularly praised Boothe's performance. At the 32nd Primetime Emmy Awards, it earned four nominations, including Outstanding Drama or Comedy Special, with Boothe winning Outstanding Lead Actor in a Limited Series or a Special.

== Synopsis ==
The film draws on Guyana Massacre: The Eyewitness Account and reports from The Washington Post at the time, to describe the life of Jim Jones from a 1960s idealist to the November 1978 mass murder/suicide of members of Peoples Temple in Jonestown, Guyana. In the beginning of the film, Jim Jones is seen helping minorities and working against racism. Later, after a move to San Francisco and increased power and attention, Jones becomes focused on his belief in nuclear holocaust, and moves hundreds of his followers to Guyana. Congressman Leo J. Ryan is notified that some individuals are being held against their will, and after going to investigate, the Guyana tragedy itself is depicted.

== Cast ==
- Powers Boothe as Jim Jones
- Ned Beatty as Congressman Leo J. Ryan
- James Earl Jones as Father Divine
- Randy Quaid as Clayton Richie, based on Timothy Stoen
- Meg Foster as Jean Richie
- Linda Haynes as Karen Bundy
- Brad Dourif as David Langtree based on Larry Schacht
- LeVar Burton as Richard Jefferson
- Michael C. Gwynne as Larry King
- Veronica Cartwright as Marceline Jones
- Albert Hall as Otis Jefferson
- Diane Ladd as Lynette Jones
- Diana Scarwid as Sheila Langtree
- Colleen Dewhurst as Mrs. Myrtle Kennedy
- Irene Cara as Alice Jefferson
- Rosalind Cash as Jenny Hammond
- Ron O'Neal as Colonel Robles
- Brenda Vaccaro as Jane Briggs
- Joel Godard as John Briggs
- Clifton James as Charlie Amos, The Barber
- Ed Lauter as Jim Jones Sr.
- David Raynr as Raymond Jefferson

== Characters ==
Jones's family members in the movie are based directly on his own family. The characters of Clayton and Jean Richie are based on Timothy and Grace Stoen (he was a primary Temple attorney and Jones's former right-hand man, she a main organizer for the Temple's "Planning Commission"), and David Langtree on Larry Schacht (the sole doctor at Jonestown), though elements of other Temple members are added to each, and details are changed. Many of the other characters are composites of one or more persons.

The character of Larry King has been likened to Larry Layton, a Peoples Temple member who took part in the assassination of Congressman Leo Ryan.

== Production ==
Though not a documentary in its own right, the film takes the style of a "true life" portrayal of the events. James Earl Jones appears in the film, as spiritual leader Father Divine. The final scenes of the film, with dialog taken from the infamous "Jonestown death tape" (FBI Number Q 042), were produced in a documentary cinematic style, and shot in Puerto Rico and Georgia instead of Guyana. The film was originally broadcast in two parts by CBS Television, on April 15 and 16.

== Reception and awards ==
1980, promotional movie poster

A 1980 Time magazine review was mostly positive, but criticized the film for spending too much time on earlier parts of Jones' life, stating: "There really is no point in recounting the minutiae of a madman's life if, after four hours, it is still impossible to understand how Jones became a sex-and-drug-crazed megalomaniac or why his misfit followers so easily accepted his larcenous and sadistic behavior." The Time review went on to also note the way Boothe captured the minutiae of the Jim Jones character, and lamented that the film's writer had not made the role more complex for Boothe to portray.

Actor Powers Boothe, who played the role of Jim Jones, won the 1980 Emmy Award for Outstanding Lead Actor in a Limited Series or a Special for his portrayal in the film. Boothe was the only nominated actor in any category to attend the awards ceremony, since the Screen Actors Guild was boycotting the event during a strike. In his acceptance speech, Boothe remarked, "This is either the most courageous moment of my career or the stupidest." The film was also nominated for Emmy Awards in three other categories, including Outstanding Achievement in Film Sound Mixing, Outstanding Directing in a Limited Series or a Special, and Outstanding Drama or Comedy Special. The film was also nominated for an Eddie Award, for Best Edited Episode from a Television Mini-Series, by the American Cinema Editors.
