= Charles Garry =

American civil rights attorney (1909–1991)

- Born: Charles Garabedian; March 17, 1909; Bridgewater, Massachusetts, U.S.
- Died: August 16, 1991 (aged 82); Berkeley, California, U.S.
- Known for: Lawyer in the Peoples Temple of Jonestown; Legal counsel for the Black Panther Party

Charles R. Garry (March 17, 1909 – August 16, 1991) was an American civil rights attorney who represented a number of high-profile clients in political cases during the 1960s and 1970s, including Huey P. Newton during his 1968 capital murder trial and the Peoples Temple during the 1978 Jonestown tragedy.

== Early life ==
Born in Bridgewater, Massachusetts, to Armenian immigrant parents who had escaped the Hamidian massacres in the Ottoman Empire, Garry grew up in a farm town in California's Central Valley. The family name was originally Garabedian. He worked his way through law school at night at a cleaning shop and was a Great Depression-era socialist who began his legal career defending militant trade unions. Like many in his generation, Garry earned his law degree without attending college, and suffered difficulty with spelling and syntax. An avowed Marxist lawyer, Garry earned a reputation of fighting for underdogs. He insisted on a full truthful disclosure from those he represented, and had a sign on his desk that read "the only clients of mine who go to San Quentin are the ones who lie to me."

In 1948, Garry was brought before the House Un-American Activities Committee (HUAC). Garry declared that he was both a Christian and a Communist and, in response to queries regarding the denial of God by Communists, Garry responded by saying, "Mr. Chairman, what the Communists do for their God is their own business. What I do for my God is my own, and none of yours!" In the 1950s, Garry represented other alleged Communists before the HUAC and refused to answer questions himself stating, "I told them to kiss my ass."

== Black Panthers and Oakland Seven ==
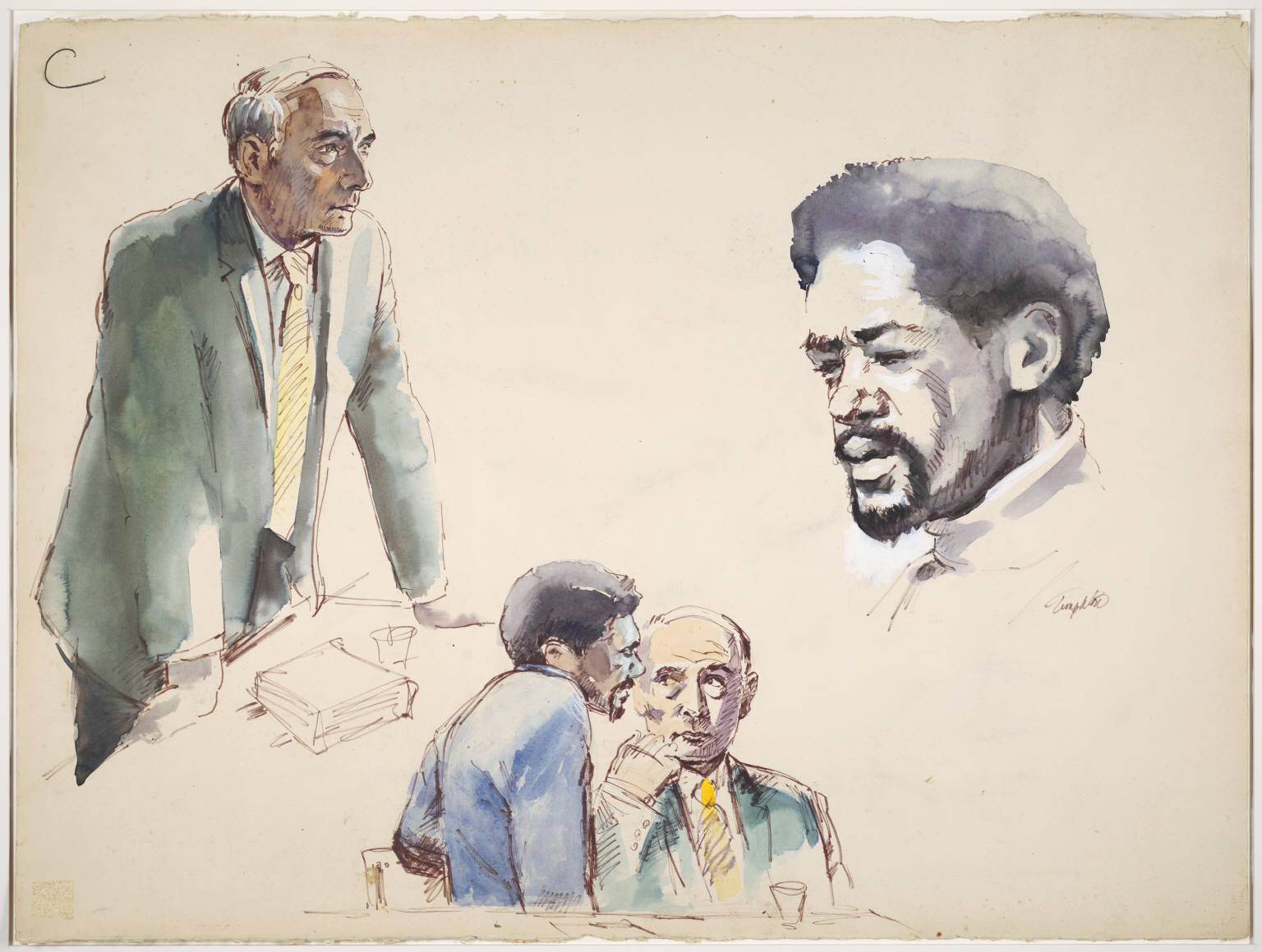
Robert Templeton painting of Garry and Seale

In 1968, he was retained by the Black Panther Party as their chief counsel, and to defend Huey P. Newton in the 1967 death of Oakland police officer John Frey. Newton was convicted on the lesser charge of manslaughter. Subsequently, he defended Black Panther Chairman Bobby Seale. Garry was famous for flair and courtroom dramatics, and one policeman, under intense questioning, jumped from the witness stand and pulled his gun on Garry.

In 1969, he defended the "Oakland Seven", a group of San Francisco Bay Area anti-Vietnam War activists who were involved in the planning of the 1967 Stop the Draft Week. After the turbulent era of the 1960s came to an end and with the demise of the anti-war and Black Power movements, Garry took on a new set of clients.

== Peoples Temple ==
In 1977, amidst media scrutiny and potential litigation, Garry began representing the controversial Peoples Temple, led by Jim Jones, in a number of suits, including several by and against Timothy Stoen. Garry's political philosophy meshed at least to some degree with that of the Temple, a socialist organization, and many felt that Garry's representation added credibility to the Temple as a political organization. Garry believed that the Temple had managed to establish in Jonestown what Garry himself referred to as "paradise". Garry believed that the Temple picked up where the movement of the 1960s left off, and that Jonestown was like "socialized society".

After listening to Temple members discuss the history of the case, Garry initially announced on September 8, 1977, that "[w]e've come to the conclusion that there is a conspiracy by government agencies to destroy Peoples Temple as a viable community organization." After further experience with the Temple, including reviewing the results of several Freedom of Information Act requests, Garry eventually changed his conclusion to the belief that there was little government interest, let alone a conspiracy.

Throughout his representation, Garry argued with members of the Temple. Garry had a tumultuous relationship with another Temple attorney, Mark Lane, because Garry felt that Lane repeatedly interfered in Garry's areas of representation and made too high profile the Temple's claims of a conspiracy against it.

Garry and Lane accompanied Congressman Leo Ryan and his delegation on their investigation of Jonestown in November 1978. On November 18, 1978, Garry and Lane escaped potential harm at Jonestown by talking their way past Temple security at a house to which they were sent that was located some distance from Jonestown's pavilion. That day, 918 people died in Jonestown and Georgetown, which comprised the greatest single loss of American civilian life in a non-natural disaster until the incidents of September 11, 2001. In addition, five people were murdered by Temple members at a nearby airstrip, including Congressman Ryan, who became the only congressman murdered in the line of duty in United States history.

== Later life ==
While Garry continued to practice law after the Jonestown incident, his clientele changed and his chance for further national acclaim had passed. His post-Jonestown press conferences of November/December 1978 served as his final public acts. Garry served as president of California Attorneys for Criminal Justice in 1979. Garry died of a stroke in August 1991, at the age of 82 in Berkeley, California.
