= Christine Miller =

Figure within the Peoples Temple (1945–1978)

- Born: June 4, 1918; Brownsville, Texas, U.S.
- Died: November 18, 1978 (aged 60); Jonestown, Guyana
- Cause of death: Cyanide poisoning
- Known for: Attempts to prevent Jonestown massacre

Christine Miller (June 4, 1918 – November 18, 1978) was a member of the Peoples Temple cult led by Jim Jones. She is notable for being the only known Temple member to publicly urge Jones against carrying out the group's mass murder in Jonestown, Guyana on November 18, 1978. Ultimately, she was unsuccessful in persuading Jones and died that same day, alongside 908 other Temple members.

== Background ==
Miller was born in Brownsville, Texas in 1918 and worked as a county clerk before joining the Peoples Temple in Los Angeles. She was African-American. On January 3, 1978, she moved to the newly built Temple communal settlement of Jonestown in Guyana.

== Events at Jonestown ==
On November 18, 1978, Congressman Leo Ryan, who had been visiting the Peoples Temple as part of a government investigation, left Jonestown with several defectors. Jim Jones sent Temple gunmen to ambush them at the Port Kaituma airstrip, killing Ryan and four others. Later that day, Jones called all Temple members in Jonestown to the pavilion to commit suicide. Jones' aides prepared a large metal tub with poisoned Flavor Aid for that purpose. Once the Temple members had gathered, Jones told them that they must all commit suicide as a "revolutionary act" and to protect their children from being "butchered" by the U.S. government once they find out about Leo Ryan's murder. In response, Miller stood up and argued that Temple members should instead attempt an airlift to the Soviet Union, which Jones claimed was not feasible. Miller contended that "when we destroy ourselves, we are defeated" and stated, confronting Jones with his own past words, that "I feel like as long as there’s life, there’s hope. That’s my faith." Miller further argued that the young children in Jonestown deserved to live. Jones countered by saying that "someday everybody dies, some place that hope runs out" and that the children of Jonestown deserved peace through death.

Jim McElvane, a member of Temple leadership, chastised Miller for challenging Jones and claimed that she was only standing where she was because of Jones; which was met with cheers. Miller continued to try and persuade Jones to call off the mass suicide, but was ultimately shouted down by the crowd, which had become hostile toward her. Miller and 908 others, including 304 children, died at Jonestown.

The circumstances of specifically Miller’s death are vague. During previous trial runs of mass suicide at Jonestown, those expressing opposition to the act were typically sat near the front under the pavilion, indicating they would be the first to die; surviving eyewitnesses later stated that Miller was seated with friends at the second row near the front before the massacre started. Members who resisted drinking the poison were promptly restrained and had the cyanide injected into their body. Many authors said that Miller’s body had traces of injection marks on her arm, though these claims have remained unfounded.

== Legacy ==
Miller is regarded in modern times by some as a symbol of courageous dissent and advocacy, a virtue Jones himself acknowledged during their last debate. Peoples Temple researcher Michael Bellefountaine wrote that Miller's protests "might have given voice to many Jonestown residents who did not want to die". He praised Miller for sticking to her beliefs and being "a beacon for those who realize that self-respect comes from inside." Author Sikivu Hutchinson has characterized Miller as "valiantly and singularly standing up against Jim Jones" and "speaking for the voiceless".
