= Jeannie Mills =

American cult defector (1939–1980)

- Born: Deanna Mertle; July 2, 1939
- Died: February 27, 1980 (aged 40); Berkeley, California
- Cause of death: Gunshot wounds
- Known for: Victim of unsolved murder Peoples Temple defector

Jeannie Mills (née Gustafson; July 2, 1939 – February 27, 1980), formerly Deanna Mertle, was an early defector from the Peoples Temple organization headed by Jim Jones. With her husband and Elmer Mertle, she co-founded the Concerned Relatives of Peoples Temple Members organization in 1977. Mills was murdered in 1980 along with her husband and one of her daughters, in a killing which remains unsolved.

== Background ==
Jeannie Mills, her husband Al, and her children joined the Peoples Temple in 1969. As Deanna and Elmer Mertle, Jeannie served as head of the Temple's publications office while Al was the official photographer. The couple left the Temple with their five children in 1974 after Jones beat their daughter Linda seventy times with a paddle for a minor infraction. The family legally changed their names to void the power of attorney they had earlier given Jones.

After her defection, Mills published a memoir, Six Years with God: Life inside Rev. Jim Jones's Peoples Temple, and established the Berkeley Human Freedom Center with her husband. She later co-founded the Concerned Relatives of Peoples Temple Members, a support group for Temple defectors and their families. The Concerned Relatives eventually persuaded U.S. Representative Leo Ryan to undertake a fact-finding mission to the Temple's Jonestown settlement in Guyana, which ultimately led to Ryan's murder and the mass murder-suicide at Jonestown on November 18, 1978. After the killings, the Mills family initially holed up with other defectors in the protective custody of a police SWAT team, but eventually decided to resume normal life.

== Murder ==
Mills, along with her husband Al and their 15-year-old daughter Daphene, were murdered execution-style inside their home in Berkeley, California, on February 26, 1980, just over a year after the Jonestown massacre. Their 17-year-old son Eddie was home at the time, but was left unharmed. There was no forced entry, and burglary was quickly ruled out as a motive. Eddie claimed he was unaware that the killings had taken place, even though police found gunshot residue on his hands.

The Mills murders raised the fear that Temple "hit squads" – former members out to "avenge" the Jonestown deaths – were involved. The theory was never substantiated. With no leads, the investigation was eventually shelved and the case went cold. In 2005, police re-interviewed several surviving members of the Mills family. On December 3, 2005, 43-year-old Eddie Mills was arrested at San Francisco International Airport after returning to the U.S. for the first time in several years. However, the Alameda County District Attorney's Office declined to file charges, citing a lack of evidence. Eddie Mills returned to Japan, where he lives with his wife and two children. The Mills murders remain unsolved.

== See also ==
- List of unsolved murders (1980–1999)
