= Marshall Kilduff =

American journalist (born 1949)

Marshall Kilduff (born February 14, 1949) is a retired journalist, having written for the San Francisco Chronicle since 1971. On January 17, 2021, he announced his retirement in his regular column.

He is noted for being the coauthor of the investigatory report criticizing the leader of Peoples Temple, Jim Jones. In 1978, after the publication of the article in New West Magazine, Jones and the Peoples Temple congregation fled to Jonestown, Guyana. Kilduff has been with the Chronicle ever since, becoming an editor and later an editorial writer. He began a weekly quiz in the Chronicle's Insight section testing readers' knowledge of the news of the week.

== Early life ==
Kilduff was born in San Francisco in 1949. He went on to attend Town School for Boys through eighth grade and later St. Ignatius College Preparatory before transferring to St. George's School, in Middletown, Rhode Island, for the remainder of high school. After graduating, Kilduff attended Stanford University and graduated with a major in English.
