= Don Harris (journalist) =

American journalist (1936–1978)

- Born: Rozak Darwin Humphrey; September 8, 1936; Vidalia, Georgia, U.S.
- Died: November 18, 1978 (aged 42); Port Kaituma, Guyana
- Cause of death: Gunshot wounds
- Occupation: Journalist
- Employer: NBC News

Don Harris (September 8, 1936 – November 18, 1978) was an NBC News correspondent who was killed after departing Jonestown, an agricultural commune owned by the Peoples Temple in Guyana. On November 18, 1978, he and four others (including Leo Ryan) were killed by gunfire by Temple members at a nearby airstrip in Port Kaituma, Guyana. Their murders preceded the death of 909 Temple members in Jonestown and four Temple members in Georgetown, Guyana.

== Early life and career ==
Harris, whose real name was Roy Darwin Humphrey, was born near Vidalia, Georgia. In 1957, Harris worked first for WVOP, a radio station located near the place of his birth. He then began delivering television weather reports at a station in North Carolina. From 1964 to 1968, Harris worked at WTVT in Tampa, Florida as a staff announcer and morning show producer. From 1968 to 1969, he worked at WTOP (now WUSA-TV) in Washington, D.C. In December 1969, he began working as a reporter and news anchor at WFAA-TV in Dallas, Texas. From 1970 to 1972, Harris concurrently co-hosted a live morning TV newsmagazine called News 8 etc... Harris quit WFAA in 1973 following a dispute with management.

In 1973, he began work for NBC-owned KNBC-TV in Los Angeles. In 1975, NBC promoted Harris to the network news staff, where he covered the fall of Saigon and reported from the trenches in Vietnam. American soldiers referred to Harris as "Mr. Lucky" because Harris managed to dodge bullets and avoid land mines.

Harris won four Emmys and the a DuPont/Columbia Award. In the spring of 1978, before traveling to Jonestown, Harris broadcast an investigative piece on international terrorism that ran on NBC Nightly News.

== Death ==
Jonestown, Guyana

On November 14, 1978, Harris accompanied U.S. Representative Leo Ryan from California, NBC cameraman Bob Brown, NBC producer Bob Flick, NBC sound engineer Steve Sung and several other journalists to Georgetown, Guyana. The group was investigating rumors of torture, kidnapping and other offenses by the Peoples Temple in an agricultural commune located 150 miles (240 km) from Georgetown that the Temple called Jonestown. Harris' son, Jeffrey Humphrey, said that Harris' family was not particularly worried about Harris' safety at the time because of the danger surrounding the war stories Harris had previously covered. Some of Harris' colleagues at NBC, however, had tried to talk him out of traveling to Guyana.

On November 17, Ryan, Harris and the other journalists flew to Jonestown. The Peoples Temple's lawyers, Mark Lane and Charles Garry, initially refused to allow Ryan's party access to Jonestown. After Temple leader Jim Jones allowed the party to enter Jonestown, that night, Harris and the Ryan delegation attended a reception in a pavilion in the settlement.

At that reception, unbeknownst to Jones, Temple member Vernon Gosney passed a note to Don Harris (mistaking him for Ryan), which read "Dear Congressman, Vernon Gosney and Monica Bagby [another Temple member]. Please help us get out of Jonestown." Harris then passed the note to Ryan. After the reception, Harris and other media members were informed that the Temple could not provide lodging for them in Jonestown, so that they had to travel to Port Kaituma for the night.

On November 18, when Harris and other journalists arrived back in Jonestown, Jim Jones' wife Marceline gave them a tour of the settlement. That afternoon, two families requested to leave with the Ryan delegation. Harris and other reporters were permitted to interview Jones. Jones told Harris and other reporters that, like others who left the Temple, the defectors would "lie" and destroy Jonestown.

Camera-shot by Bob Brown (NBC) of shooters

That afternoon, Harris and the rest of the delegation traveled by Temple dump truck to the nearby Port Kaituma airstrip to depart for Georgetown. While attempting to board a twin-engine Otter airplane, a group of Temple members drove a red tractor pulling a trailer toward the airplane on which Harris was departing. "There might be violence," Harris half-jokingly said, and asked Bob Brown to take pictures.

Bob Brown began filming the armed Peoples Temple members as they approached, and continued filming them as they then opened fire on his unarmed party. As Brown filmed the shooters, they murdered him. Harris died in the attack, along with Ryan, Brown, San Francisco Examiner photographer Greg Robinson and defecting Temple member Patricia Parks. The murder of Congressman Ryan was the first and only murder of a member of Congress in the line of duty in the history of the United States.

Later that same day, 909 inhabitants of Jonestown, 276 of them children, died of apparent cyanide poisoning, mostly in and around a pavilion. This resulted in the greatest single loss of American civilian life in a non-natural disaster until the September 11, 2001, attacks.

Harris was survived by a wife, Shirley; two daughters, Claire and Lauren; and a son, Jeffrey who, following in his father's footsteps, is now a reporter in for KXLY-TV in Spokane, Washington. The family lived in Woodland Hills, California, a suburb of Los Angeles.
