= Flavor Aid =

Non-carbonated soft drink beverage powder

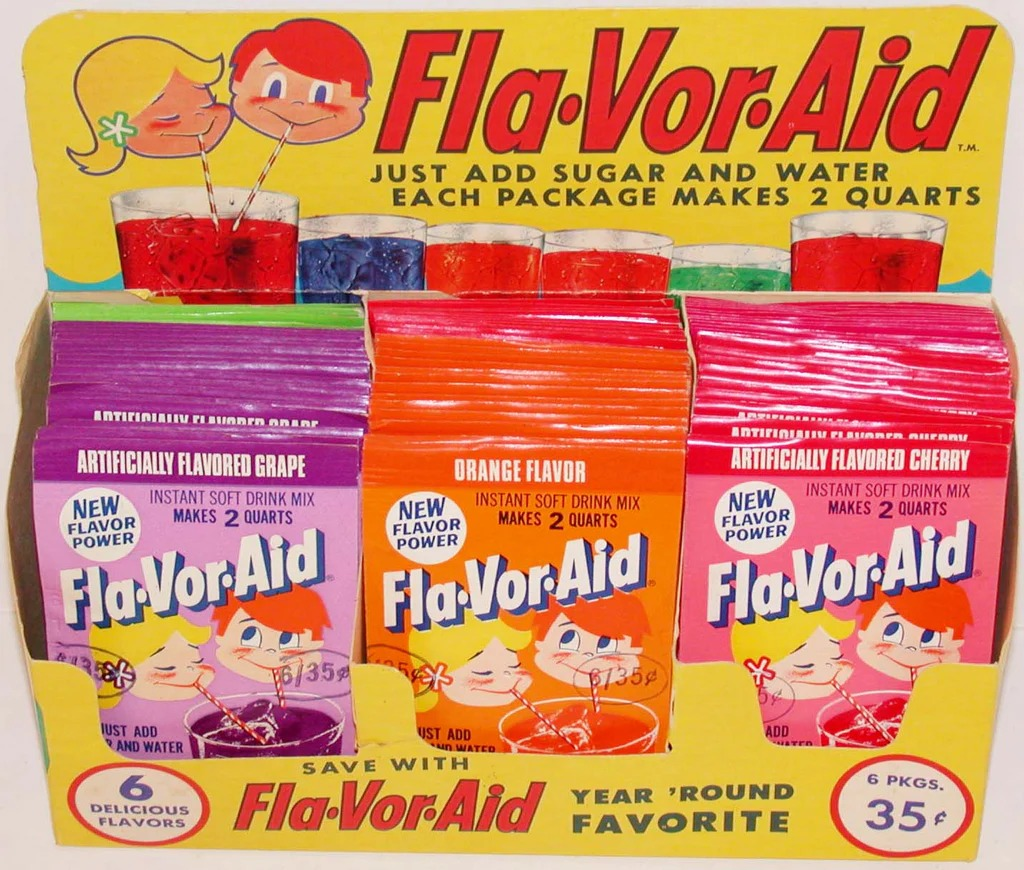
A Flavor Aid display box from the 1960s

Flavor Aid (originally stylized as Fla·Vor·Aid) is a non-carbonated soft drink beverage made by the Jel Sert Company in West Chicago, Illinois. It is sold as an unsweetened, powdered concentrate drink mix, and is frequently compared to the similar Kool-Aid brand drink mix. It comes in several flavors.

== Jonestown massacre ==
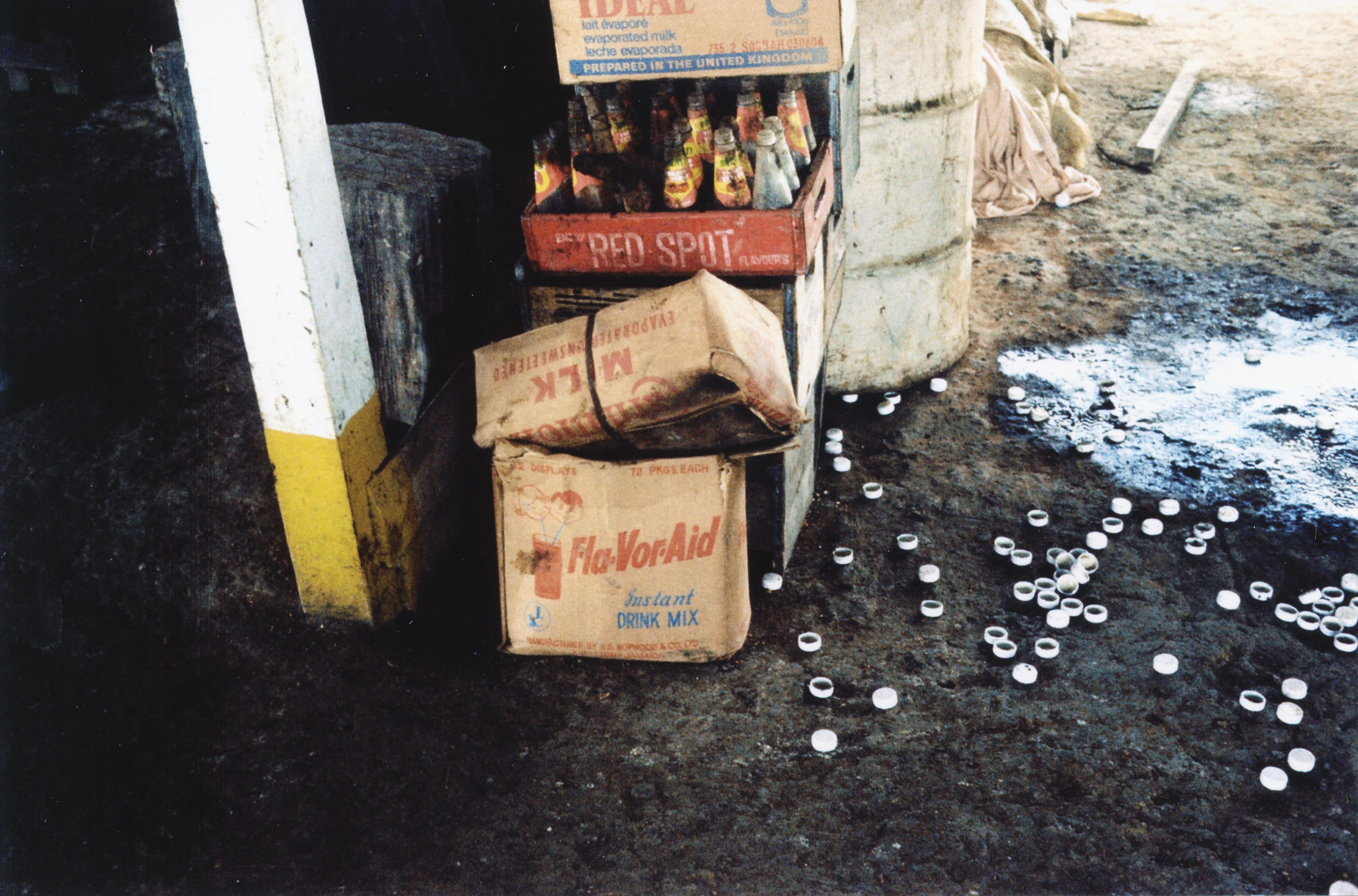
Fla-Vor-Aid boxes and containers at Jonestown (FBI photograph)

The drink became infamous for being linked to the Jonestown mass murder-and-suicide when it was learned that the cyanide poison taken by or forcibly administered to the commune's members was placed in Flavor Aid. Large barrels filled with the grape variety, laced with the cyanide and a variety of tranquillizer drugs, were found half-consumed amidst the hundreds of bodies.

Kool-Aid, rather than Flavor Aid, due to being the better-known brand, is usually erroneously referred to as the drink used in the massacre. The association with Kool-Aid has spawned the figure of speech "drink the Kool-Aid". Criminal investigators testifying at the Jonestown inquest spoke of finding packets of "Kool aid" (sic), and eyewitnesses to the incident are also recorded as speaking of "kool aid" or "Cool Aid", though likely as a result of the Mandela effect or of generic usage of the trademark.
