= California (magazine, defunct 1991) =

Defunct American magazine

- Categories: Politics and lifestyle
- Frequency: Monthly
- First issue: 26 April 1976 (as New West)
- Final issue: September 1991
- Country: United States
- Based in: Los Angeles
- Language: English

California was an American monthly magazine, published from 1976 to 1991, which focused on the state of California.

It was founded as New West magazine in 1976 by Clay Felker, founder of New York magazine, as its sister publication covering the West Coast. It was purchased by Rupert Murdoch in 1977. In 1980, it was sold to Mediatex Communications Corp., which published Texas Monthly. Mediatex changed the name of the magazine to California in 1981.

For 15 years, the magazine featured writers of the New Journalism movement, including Tom Wolfe, Joan Didion and Joe Eszterhas. The magazine first exposed Jim Jones' People's Temple. Jones left the same night that an editor at New West magazine read him an article to be published by Marshall Kilduff detailing allegations of abuse by former Temple members.

The magazine exposed defects in Firestone tires and issues with the sleeping pill Halcion. A California May 1983 article "Top Guns", written by Ehud Yonay, profiled US Navy pilots training at Naval Air Station Miramar in San Diego and served as the inspiration for the 1986 movie Top Gun.

The magazine's circulation peaked at about 360,000 in 1987. By 1991, circulation had dropped to 250,000 and it was shut down along with sister publication SF.
