= Seductive Poison =

First-hand account of the Peoples Temple in Jonestown by Deborah Layton

- Paperback edition
- Author: Deborah Layton
- Language: English
- Subject: Destructive cults, mass suicide
- Publisher: Anchor~Doubleday
- Publication date: 1998 Anchor~Doubleday; 2014 Random House Audio
- Publication place: United States, Italy, France, Australia, Germany, Thailand, UK
- Media type: Print
- Pages: 368
- ISBN: 0-385-48984-6
- OCLC: 43461666

Seductive Poison: A Jonestown Survivor's Story of Life and Death in the Peoples Temple is a first-hand account of the incidents surrounding Peoples Temple (whose base in Guyana was the scene of the 1978 Jonestown massacre), written by survivor Deborah Layton (born February 7, 1953), a high-level member of the Peoples Temple until her escape from the encampment. The first edition of the book was published by Anchor~Doubleday in hardcover on November 3, 1998, and the second edition was published in paperback on November 9, 1999. In 2014, Random House Audio made Seductive Poison into an audio-book read by the author and narrator, Kathe Mazur. Charles Krause, the young Washington Post journalist who accompanied Congressman Leo Ryan into Jonestown and was injured at the airstrip, reads his foreword.

Layton's older brother Larry was the only one ever prosecuted for the murders of the congressional team by Temple members. After over twenty years in prison, Larry Layton was released on parole in 2002, largely due to the testimony of Vernon Gosney, one of the few survivors of the massacre, and the Federal Chief Judge, Robert F. Peckham.

The book is published in Italy, France, Australia, Germany, Thailand and United Kingdom.

== See also ==
- Jim Jones
- Peoples Temple in San Francisco
- Timothy Stoen
- Jonestown: The Life and Death of Peoples Temple
- Mass suicide
- Destructive cult
