= Jonestown =

Peoples Temple cult settlement in Guyana, led by Jim Jones

Peoples Temple Agricultural Project "Jonestown"
- Mission
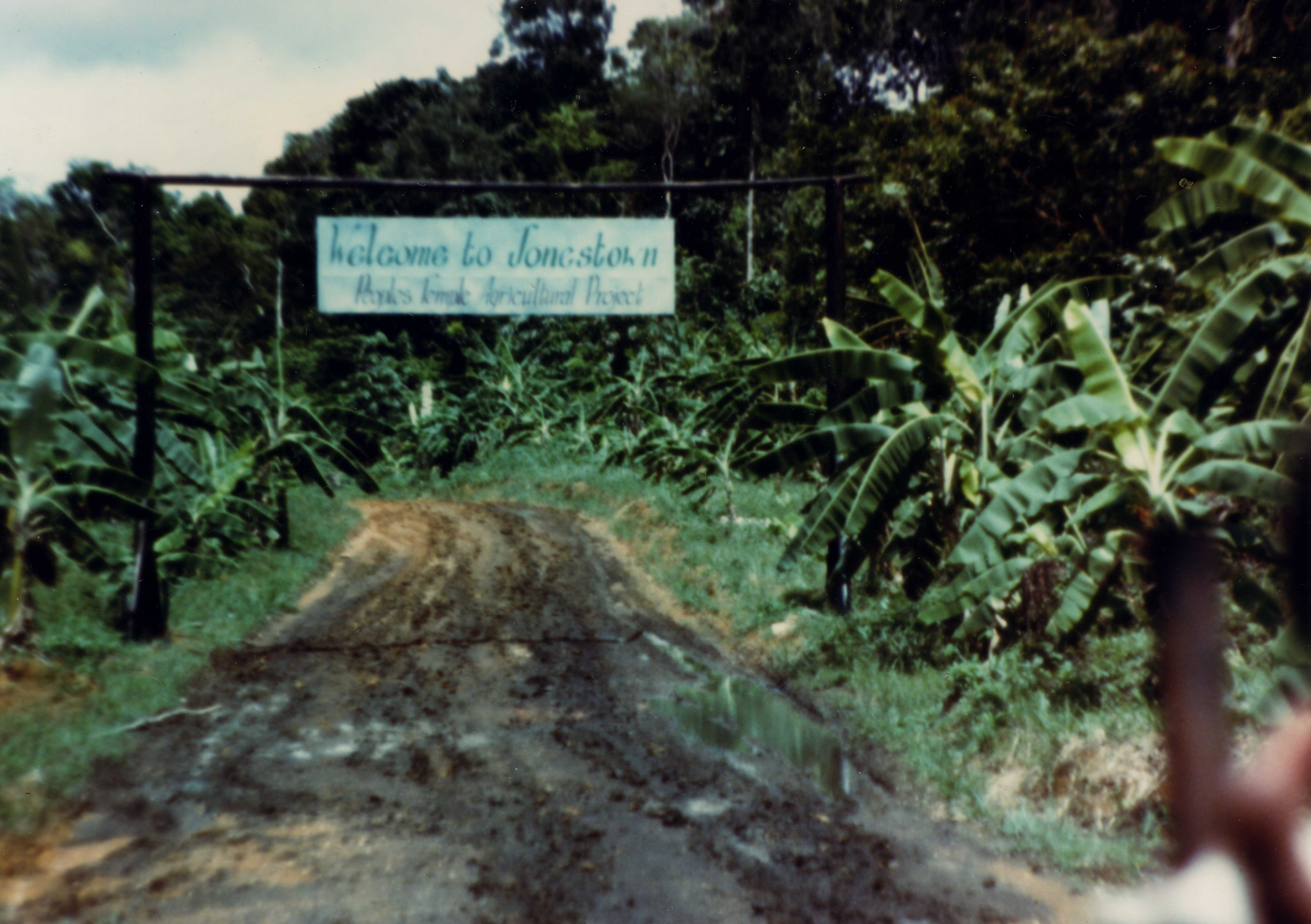
- The entrance to Jonestown, 1978
- Interactive map of Peoples Temple Agricultural Project
- Coordinates: 7°41′22″N 59°57′0″W
- Country: Guyana
- Region: Barima-Waini
- Settled: 1973
- Fell: 1978

Government
  - Type: Commune
  - Leader: Jim Jones

Population (1978)
  - Total: 1,005

The Peoples Temple Agricultural Project's places of interest in Guyana

The Peoples Temple Agricultural Project, better known by its informal name Jonestown, was a remote commune in Guyana established by the Peoples Temple, an American religious organization led by Jim Jones. On November 18, 1978, 918 people died in a coordinated mass murder-suicide across three locations: the Jonestown compound, a nearby airstrip in Port Kaituma, and the group's headquarters in Georgetown, making "Jonestown" internationally infamous. The name of the settlement became synonymous with the incidents at those locations.

A total of 909 individuals died in Jonestown itself, all but two from apparent cyanide poisoning, many of whom were injected against their will. Jones and some Peoples Temple members referred to the act as a "revolutionary suicide" on an audio tape of the event, and in prior recorded discussions. The poisonings in Jonestown followed the murder of five others, including U.S. Congressman Leo Ryan, by Temple members at Port Kaituma, an act that Jones ordered. Four other Temple members committed murder-suicide in Georgetown at Jones's command.

Terms used to describe the deaths in Jonestown and Georgetown have evolved over time. Many contemporary media accounts after the events called the deaths a mass suicide. In contrast, later sources refer to the deaths with terms such as mass murder-suicide, a massacre, or mass murder. Seventy or more individuals at Jonestown were injected with poison, a third of the victims were minors, and armed guards had been ordered to shoot anyone who attempted to flee the settlement as Jones lobbied for suicide.

== Origins ==
Some of the Peoples Temple California locations

The Peoples Temple was formed by Jim Jones in Indianapolis, Indiana, in 1955. The movement purported to practice what it called "apostolic socialism." In doing so, the Temple preached that "those who remained drugged with the opiate of religion had to be brought to enlightenment – socialism." Jones had held an interest in Joseph Stalin and Mao Zedong, and would later frequently praise Stalin and Vladimir Lenin as heroes. He was also upset with persecution against the Communist Party USA. In the early 1960s, Jones visited Guyana – then a British colony – while on his way to establishing a short-lived Temple mission in Brazil.

The logo of The Peoples Temple, led by Jim Jones, which controlled the commune until late 1978

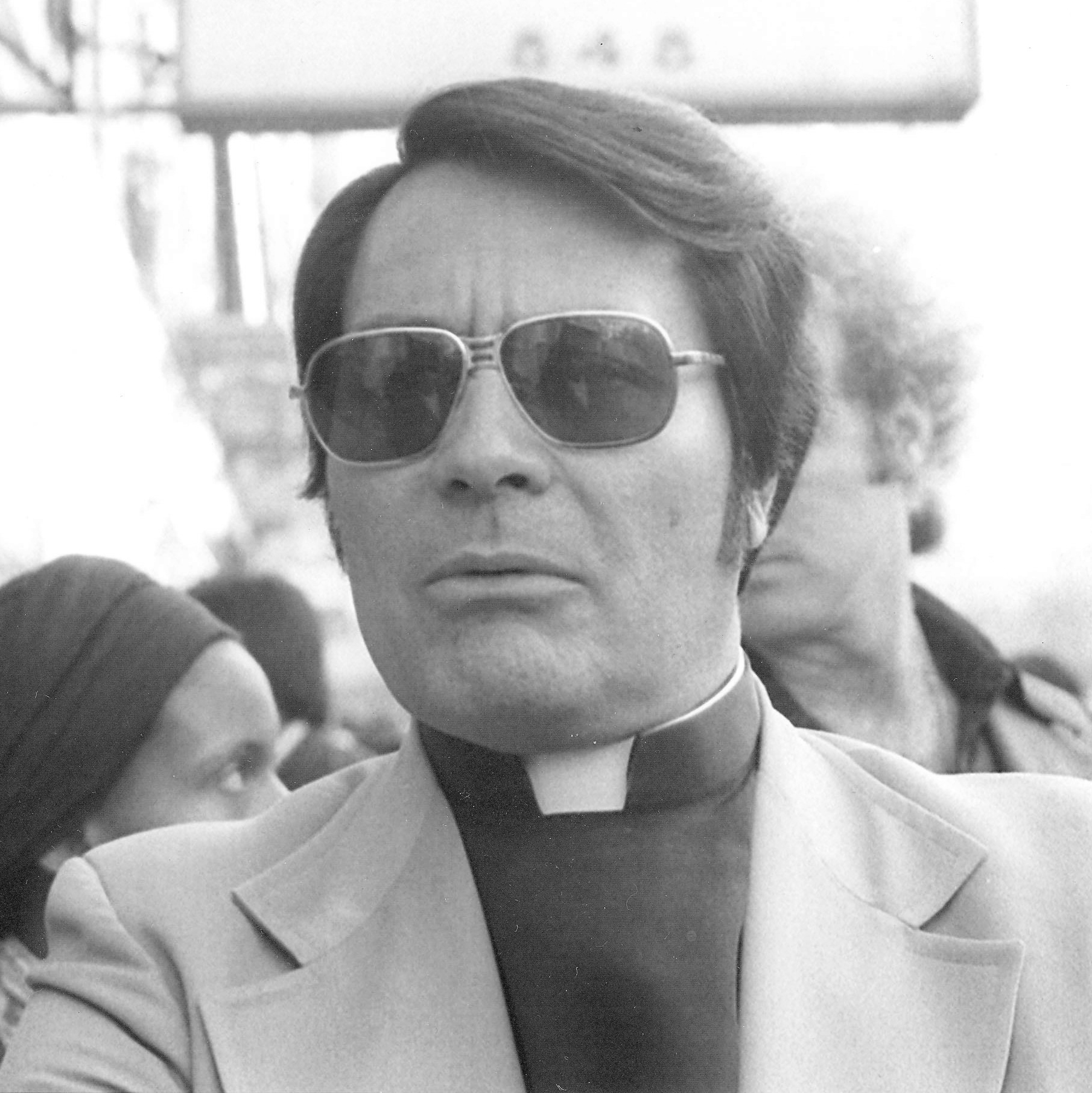
Jim Jones, founder of The Peoples Temple

After Jones received considerable criticism in Indiana for his integrationist views, the Temple moved to Redwood Valley, California, in 1965. In the early 1970s, the Temple opened other branches in Los Angeles and San Francisco, and eventually moved its headquarters to San Francisco.

With the move to San Francisco came increasing political and civic involvement by leaders of the Temple. They earned high levels of approval from the local government. After the group's participation proved instrumental in the mayoral election victory of George Moscone in 1975, Moscone appointed Jones as Chairman of the San Francisco Housing Authority.

Increasing public support in California gave Jones access to several high-ranking political figures, including vice presidential candidate Walter Mondale and First Lady Rosalynn Carter. Guests at a large 1976 testimonial dinner for Jones included Governor Jerry Brown, Lieutenant Governor Mervyn Dymally and California Assemblyman Willie Brown, among others.

== Jonestown established ==
=== Selection and establishment of Guyanese land ===
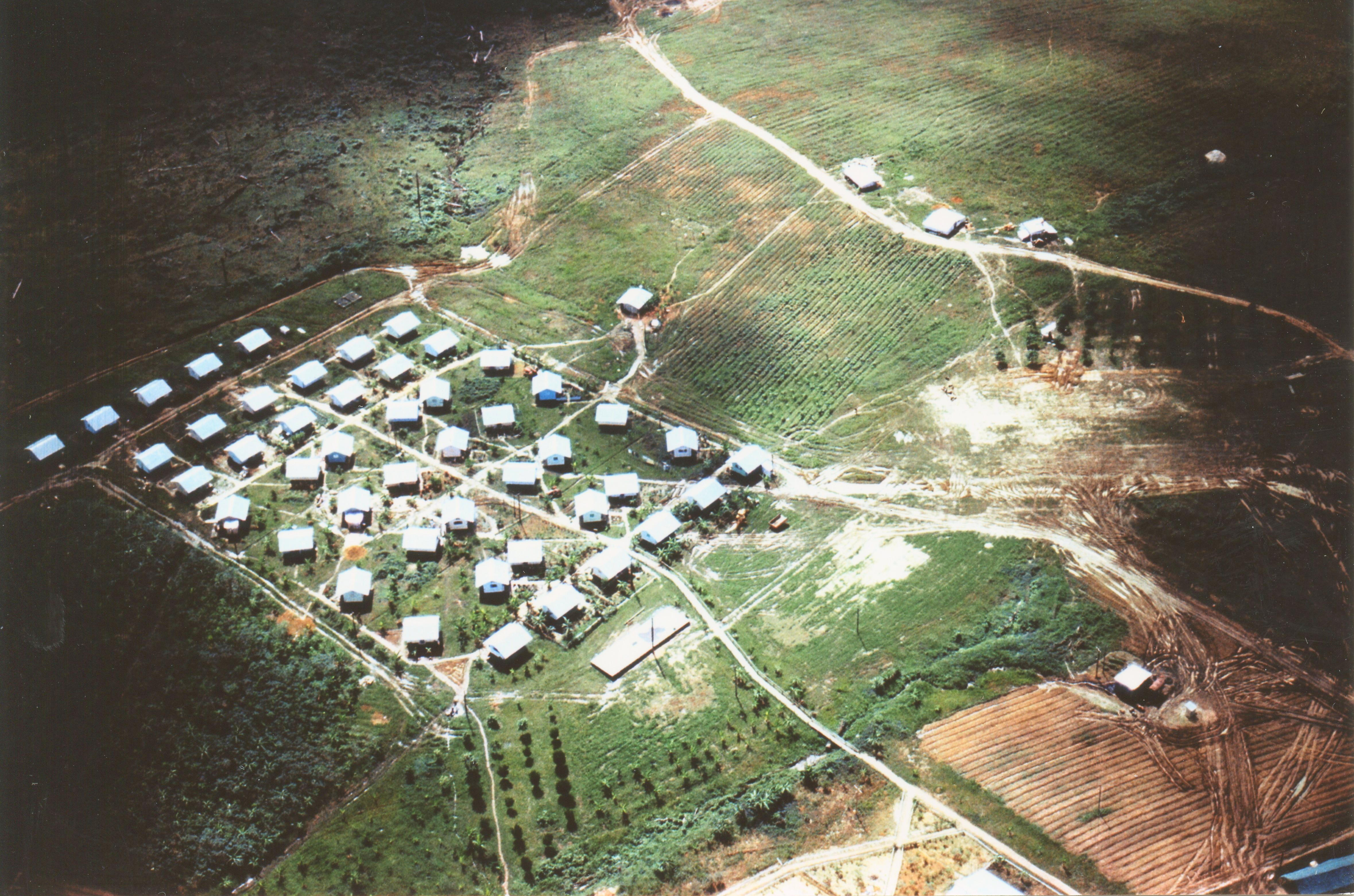
Jonestown Cottages

In the fall of 1973, after the defection of eight Temple members and critical newspaper articles by Lester Kinsolving, Jones and Temple attorney Timothy Stoen prepared an "immediate action" contingency plan for responding to a police or media crackdown. The plan listed various options, including fleeing to Canada or to a "Caribbean missionary post" such as Barbados or Trinidad. For its Caribbean missionary post, the Temple quickly chose Guyana, conducting research on its economy and extradition treaties with the United States. In October 1973, the directors of the Temple passed a resolution to establish an agricultural mission there.

The Temple chose Guyana, in part, because of the group's own socialist politics, which were moving further to the left during the selection process. Former Temple member Tim Carter stated that the reasons for choosing Guyana were the Temple's view of a perceived dominance of racism and multinational corporations in the U.S. government. According to Carter, the Temple concluded that Guyana, an English-speaking, socialist country with a government including prominent black leaders, would afford black Temple members a peaceful place to live.

Later, Guyanese Prime Minister Forbes Burnham stated that Jones may have "wanted to use cooperatives as the basis for the establishment of socialism, and maybe his idea of setting up a commune meshed with that." Jones thought that Guyana was small, poor and independent enough for him to easily obtain influence and official protection. He proved skillful in presenting the Guyanese government the benefits of allowing the Temple to establish a settlement in the country. One of the main tactics was to speak of the advantages of their American presence near Guyana's disputed border with Venezuela; this idea seemed promising to the Burnham government, who feared a military incursion by Venezuela.

In 1974, after traveling to an area of northwestern Guyana with Guyanese officials, Jones and the Temple negotiated a lease of over 3,800 acres (1,500 ha) of land in the jungle located 150 miles (240 km) west of the Guyanese capital of Georgetown. In 1976, Guyana approved the lease (retroactive to April 1974). The site, located near the disputed border with Venezuela, was isolated and had soil of low fertility. The nearest body of water was seven miles (eleven kilometres) away by muddy roads.

=== Before mass migration ===
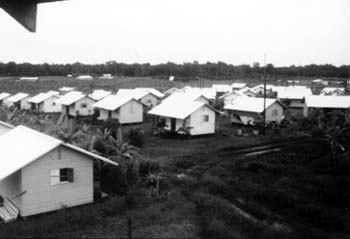
Houses in Jonestown

As five hundred members began the construction of Jonestown, the Temple encouraged more to relocate to the settlement. Jones saw Jonestown as both a "socialist paradise" and a "sanctuary" from media scrutiny. Jones reached an agreement to guarantee that Guyana would permit Temple members' mass migration. To do so, he stated that they were "skilled and progressive," showed off an envelope he claimed contained $500,000 and stated that he would invest most of the group's assets in Guyana. The relatively large number of immigrants to Guyana overwhelmed the government's small but stringent immigration infrastructure in a country where immigrants had outweighed locals. Guyanese immigration procedures were compromised to inhibit the departure of Temple defectors and curtail visas of Temple opponents.

Jonestown was held up as a benevolent communist community, with Jones stating: "I believe we're the purest communists there are." Jones's wife, Marceline, described Jonestown as "dedicated to live for socialism, total economic and racial and social equality. We are here living communally." Jones wanted to construct a model community and claimed that Burnham "couldn't rave enough about us, the wonderful things we do, the project, the model of socialism." But he did not permit members to leave Jonestown without his express prior permission.

The Temple established offices in Georgetown and conducted numerous meetings with Burnham and other Guyanese officials. In 1976, Temple member Michael Prokes requested that Burnham receive Jones as a foreign dignitary along with other "high ranking U.S. officials." Jones traveled to Guyana with Dymally to meet with Burnham and Guyanese Foreign Affairs Minister Fred Willis. In that meeting, Dymally agreed to pass on the message to the U.S. State Department that Guyana wanted to keep an open door to cooperation with the U.S. He followed up that meeting with a letter to Burnham stating that Jones was "one of the finest human beings" and that Dymally was "tremendously impressed" by his visit to Jonestown.

Temple members took pains to stress their loyalty to Burnham's People's National Congress Party. One Temple member, Paula Adams, became romantically involved with Laurence "Bonny" Mann, Guyana's ambassador to the U.S. Jones bragged about other female Temple members he referred to as "public relations women" giving all for the cause in Jonestown. Burnham's wife Viola was also a strong advocate of the Temple.

Later, Burnham stated that Guyana allowed the Temple to operate in the manner it did based on the references of Moscone, Mondale and Rosalynn Carter. He also said that, when Deputy Minister Ptolemy Reid traveled to Washington, D.C. in September 1977 to sign the Panama Canal Treaties, Mondale, by this point the U.S. Vice President, asked him, "How's Jim?", which indicated to Reid that Mondale had a personal interest in Jones's well-being.

=== Investigation and mass migration ===
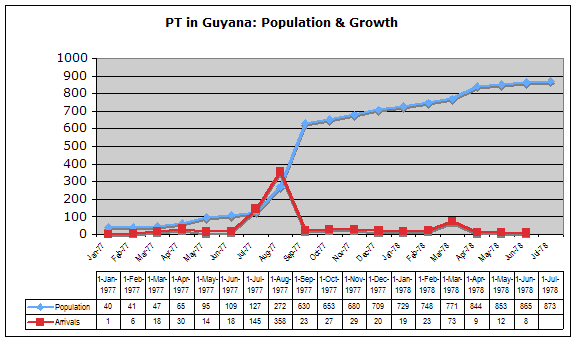
Migration to Jonestown (Migration figures after June 1978 are not known, Jonestown Report)

In the summer of 1977, Jones and several hundred Temple members moved to Jonestown to escape building pressure from San Francisco media investigations of the community. Jones left the same night that an editor at New West magazine read to him an article to be published by Marshall Kilduff, which detailed allegations of abuse by former Temple members. After the mass migration, Jonestown became overcrowded. Jonestown's population was slightly under 900 at its peak in 1978.

=== After mass migration ===
Many members of the Temple believed that Guyana would be, as Jones promised, a paradise or utopia. After Jones arrived, however, Jonestown life significantly changed. Entertaining movies from Georgetown that the settlers had watched were mostly canceled in favor of Soviet propaganda shorts and documentaries on American social problems.

Bureaucratic requirements after Jones's arrival sapped labor resources for other needs. Buildings fell into disrepair and weeds encroached on fields. School study and nighttime lectures for adults turned to Jones's discussions about revolution and enemies, with lessons focusing on Soviet alliances, and Jones's crises. He alleged that purported "mercenaries" were sent by Stoen, who had defected from the Temple and turned against the group.

For the first several months, Temple members worked in the fields for six days a week, from approximately 6:30 a.m. to 6:00 p.m., with an hour for lunch along with a 10-minute break. In mid-1978, after Jones's health deteriorated and his wife began managing more of Jonestown's operations, the work week was reduced to eight hours a day for five days a week. After the day's work ended, Temple members would attend several hours of activities in the settlement's central pavilion, including classes on socialism.

Jones compared Jonestown's work schedule to the North Korean system of eight hours of daily work followed by eight hours of study. This also comported with the Temple's practice of gradually subjecting its followers to sophisticated mind control and behavior modification techniques which Jones and his circle borrowed from Mao Zedong and Kim Il-sung. Jones would often read news and commentary, including items from Radio Moscow and Radio Havana, and was known to side with the Soviets over the Chinese during the Sino-Soviet split.

"Discussion" about current events often took the form of Jones interrogating individual followers about the implications and subtexts of a given news item, or delivering lengthy and often confused monologues on how to "read" certain events. In addition to Soviet documentaries, he repeatedly screened and analyzed such political thrillers as The Parallax View (1974), The Day of the Jackal (1973), State of Siege (1972) and Z (1969). Recordings of commune meetings show how livid and frustrated Jones would get when anyone did not find the films interesting or did not understand the message Jones was placing upon them.

Jonestown had a closed-circuit television system, but no one could view anything in the way of film or recorded TV, no matter how innocuous or seemingly politically neutral, without a Temple staffer present to "interpret" the material for the viewers. This invariably meant damning criticisms of perceived capitalist propaganda in Western material, and glowing praise for and highlighting of Marxist–Leninist messages in material from communist nations.

Jones's recorded readings of the news were part of the constant broadcasts over Jonestown's tower speakers, such that all members could hear them throughout the day and night. His news readings usually portrayed the U.S. as a "capitalist" and "imperialist" villain, while casting "socialist" leaders, such as Kim, Stalin and Robert Mugabe in a positive light.

Jonestown's primary means of communication with the outside world was a shortwave radio. All voice communications with San Francisco and Georgetown were transmitted using this radio, from mundane supply orders to confidential Temple business. The Federal Communications Commission (FCC) cited the Temple for technical violations and for using amateur frequencies for commercial purposes. Because shortwave radio was Jonestown's only effective means of non-postal communication, the Temple felt that the FCC's threats to revoke its operators' licenses threatened Jonestown's existence.

Because it stood on poor soil, Jonestown was not self-sufficient and had to import large quantities of commodities such as wheat. Temple members lived in small communal houses, some with walls woven from Troolie palm, and ate meals that reportedly consisted of nothing more on some days than rice, beans, greens and occasionally meat, sauce and eggs. Despite having access to an estimated $26 million by late 1978, Jones also lived in a tiny communal house, though fewer people lived there than in other communal houses. His house reportedly held a small refrigerator containing, at times, eggs, meat, fruit, salads and soft drinks. Medical problems, such as severe diarrhea and high fevers, struck half the community in February 1978.

Although Jonestown contained no dedicated prison and no form of capital punishment, various forms of punishment were used against members considered to have disciplinary problems. Methods included imprisonment in a 6-by-4-by-3-foot (1.8 m × 1.2 m × 0.9 m) plywood box and dangling children with ropes in a well, sometimes upside-down. This "torture hole", along with beatings, became the subject of rumor among local Guyanese. For some members who attempted to escape, drugs such as Thorazine, sodium pentathol, chloral hydrate, Demerol and Valium were administered in an "extended care unit." Armed guards patrolled the area day and night to enforce Jonestown's rules.

Children were generally surrendered to communal care, and at times were only allowed to see their biological parents briefly at night. Jones was called "Father" or "Dad" by both adults and children. The community had a nursery at which thirty-three infants were born.

For a year, it appears the commune was run primarily through Social Security checks received by members. Up to $65,000 in monthly welfare payments from U.S. government agencies to Jonestown residents were signed over to the Temple. In 1978, officials from the U.S. embassy in Georgetown interviewed Social Security recipients on multiple occasions to make sure they were not being held against their will. None of the seventy-five people interviewed by the embassy stated that they were being held captive, were forced to sign over welfare checks or wanted to leave Jonestown.

=== Demographics ===
African Americans made up approximately 70% of Jonestown's population. 45% of Jonestown residents were black women.

Jonestown Demographic Breakdown, 1977
	Female	Male	Total
Black	460	231	691
White	138	108	246
Mixed	27	12	39
Other	13	10	23
Total	638	361	999

== Before the arrival of Leo Ryan ==
=== White Nights and the Six-Day Siege ===
Jones's paranoia and drug abuse increased in Jonestown as he became fearful of a government raid on the commune, citing concerns that the community would not be able to resist an attack. He made frequent addresses to Temple members regarding Jonestown's safety, including statements that U.S. intelligence agencies were conspiring with "capitalist pigs" to destroy the settlement and harm its inhabitants.

Jones was known to regularly study Adolf Hitler and Father Divine to learn how to manipulate members of the cult. Divine told Jones personally to "find an enemy" and "to make sure they know who the enemy is" as it would unify those in the group and make them subservient to him.

After work, when purported emergencies arose, the Temple sometimes conducted what Jones referred to as "White Nights." During such events, Jones would call, "Alert, Alert, Alert" over Jonestown's tower speakers to call the community together in the pavilion, which was then surrounded by guards armed with guns and crossbows. On several occasions, Jones then gave his followers four options: attempt to flee to the Soviet Union, commit "revolutionary suicide", stay in Jonestown and fight the purported attackers or flee into the jungle.

On at least two occasions during White Nights, after a "revolutionary suicide" vote was reached, a simulated mass suicide was rehearsed. Temple defector Deborah Layton described the event in an affidavit:

Everyone, including the children, was told to line up. As we passed through the line, we were given a small glass of red liquid to drink. We were told that the liquid contained poison and that we would die within 45 minutes. We all did as we were told. When the time came when we should have dropped dead, Rev. Jones explained that the poison was not real and that we had just been through a loyalty test. He warned us that the time was not far off when it would become necessary for us to die by our own hands.

One drill lasted for six days. Known as the "Six-Day Siege," this ordeal was used thereafter by Jones as a symbol of the community's indomitable spirit. For days on end, frightened settlers ringed the commune, armed with machetes and whatever crude tools would serve as weapons. Surrounding them, Jones claimed, were mercenaries bent on murder, as well as the abduction of Jones's son John Victor Stoen and others. Marceline and others outside of the commune engaged in interminable shortwave radio conversations with Jones, seeking to dissuade him from ordering a mass suicide. The panic reached such a point that an ad hoc evacuation was ordered by Jones, with dozens of settlers hastily loaded onto boats on the George River for a purported exodus to Cuba. Several people fell into the river, suffering injuries. At last, Jones bowed to pressure, and the drill ended. Veterans of the "Siege" were held in high regard in Jonestown, and in numerous addresses Jones tearfully recalled their stoic courage on the "front line."

The Temple had received monthly half-pound shipments of cyanide since 1976 after Jones obtained a jeweler's license to buy the chemical, purportedly to clean gold. In May 1978, a Temple doctor wrote a memo to Jones asking permission to test cyanide on Jonestown's pigs, as their metabolism was close to that of human beings.

=== Stoen custody dispute ===
In September 1977, former Temple members Tim and Grace Stoen battled in a Georgetown court to produce an order for the Temple to show cause why a final order should not be issued returning their five-year-old son, John. A few days later, a second order was issued for John to be taken into protective custody by authorities. The fear of being held in contempt of the orders caused Jones to set up a false sniper attack upon himself and begin the "Six-Day Siege."

Jonestown rallies began to take an almost surreal tone as black activists Angela Davis and Huey Newton communicated via radio-telephone to the settlers, urging them to hold strong against the "conspiracy." Jones made radio broadcasts stating "we will die unless we are granted freedom from harassment and asylum." Reid finally assured Marceline that the Guyana Defence Force would not invade Jonestown.

=== Exploring another potential exodus ===
Following the "Six-Day Siege," despite Reid's assurances, Jones no longer believed the Guyanese could be trusted. He directed Temple members to write to over a dozen foreign governments inquiring about immigration policies relevant to another exodus by the Temple. He also wrote to the State Department, inquiring about North Korea and Albania, then enduring the Sino-Albanian split. In Georgetown, the Temple conducted frequent meetings with the embassies of the Soviet Union, Cuba, North Korea and Yugoslavia. Negotiations with the Soviet embassy included extensive discussions of possible resettlement there. The Temple produced memoranda discussing potential places within the Soviet Union in which they might settle.

Sharon Amos, Michael Prokes, Matthew Blunt, Timothy Regan and other Temple members took active roles in the "Guyana-Korea Friendship Society," which sponsored two seminars on the revolutionary concepts of Kim Il-sung. In April 1978, a high-ranking correspondent of the Soviet news agency TASS and his wife visited Jones. On 2 October 1978, Feodor Timofeyev, the Soviet consul in Georgetown, visited Jonestown for two days and gave a speech. Jones stated before the speech, "For many years, we have let our sympathies be quite publicly known, that the United States government was not our mother, but that the Soviet Union was our spiritual motherland." Timofeyev opened the speech stating that the Soviet Union would like to send "our deepest and the most sincere greetings to the people of this first socialist and communist community of the United States of America, in Guyana and in the world". Both speeches were met by cheers and applause from the crowd in Jonestown.

Following the visit, Temple members met almost weekly with Timofeyev to discuss a potential Soviet exodus. However, Jones eventually had a change of heart, stating that he preferred to stay within the Guyanese borders because of the sovereignty it afforded them.

=== Concerned relatives ===
Meanwhile, in late 1977 and early 1978, the Stoens participated in meetings with other relatives of Jonestown residents at the home of Jeannie Mills, another Temple defector. Together, they called themselves the "Concerned Relatives." Tim Stoen engaged in letter-writing campaigns to the U.S. Secretary of State and the Guyanese government, and traveled to Washington, D.C. to lobby for an official investigation. In January 1978, Stoen wrote a white paper to Congress detailing his grievances and requesting that congressmen write to Burnham; ninety-one congressmen, including Leo Ryan, wrote such letters.

On 17 February 1978, Jones submitted to an interview with San Francisco Examiner reporter Tim Reiterman. Reiterman's subsequent story about the Stoen custody battle prompted the immediate threat of a lawsuit by the Temple. The repercussions were devastating for the Temple's reputation, and made most former supporters more suspicious of the Temple's claims that it was the victim of a "rightist vendetta." Still, others remained loyal. On the day after Reiterman's article was published, Harvey Milk – a member of the San Francisco Board of Supervisors who was supported by the Temple – wrote a letter to President Jimmy Carter defending Jones "as a man of the highest character" and stating that Temple defectors were trying to "damage Rev. Jones's reputation" with "apparent bold-faced lies."

On 11 April 1978, the Concerned Relatives distributed a packet of documents, including letters and affidavits, that they titled an "Accusation of Human Rights Violations by Rev. James Warren Jones" to the Peoples Temple, members of the press and members of Congress. In June 1978, Layton provided the group with a further affidavit detailing alleged crimes by the Temple and substandard living conditions in Jonestown.

Tim Stoen represented three members of the Concerned Relatives in lawsuits filed in May and June 1978 against Jones and other Temple members, seeking in excess of $56 million in damages. The Temple, represented by Charles Garry, filed a suit against Stoen on 10 July 1978, seeking $150 million in damages.

=== Conspiracism ===
During July and August 1978, Jones sought the legal services of Mark Lane and Donald Freed, both Kennedy assassination conspiracy theorists, to help make the case of a "grand conspiracy" by U.S. intelligence agencies against the Temple. Jones told Lane he wanted to "pull an Eldridge Cleaver" and return to the U.S. after repairing his reputation. In September, Lane spoke to the residents of Jonestown, providing support for Jones's theories and comparing him to Martin Luther King Jr. Lane then held press conferences stating that "none of the charges" against the Temple "are accurate or true" and that there was a "massive conspiracy" against the Temple by "intelligence organizations," naming the CIA, the FBI, and even the U.S. Postal Service. Though Lane presented himself as a disinterested party, Jones was actually paying him $6,000 per month to generate such theories.

=== Jones's declining physical and mental health ===
Jones's health significantly declined in Jonestown. In 1978, he was informed of a possible lung infection, upon which he announced to his followers that he had lung cancer – a ploy to foster sympathy and strengthen support within the community.

Jones was said to be abusing injectable Valium, Quaaludes, stimulants and barbiturates. Audio tapes of 1978 meetings exhibit Jones complaining of high blood pressure, small strokes, weight loss of thirty to forty pounds within the span of two weeks, temporary blindness, convulsions and, in his final month, grotesque swelling of the extremities. During meetings and public addresses, Jones's once-sharp speaking voice often sounded slurred; words ran together or were tripped over. He would occasionally not finish sentences even when reading typed reports over the commune's speaker system.

Reiterman was surprised by the severe deterioration of Jones's health when he saw him in Jonestown on November 17, 1978. After covering Jones for eighteen months for the Examiner, he thought it was "shocking to see his glazed eyes and festering paranoia face to face, to realize that nearly a thousand lives, ours included, were in his hands."

== Leo Ryan visit ==
=== Initial investigation ===
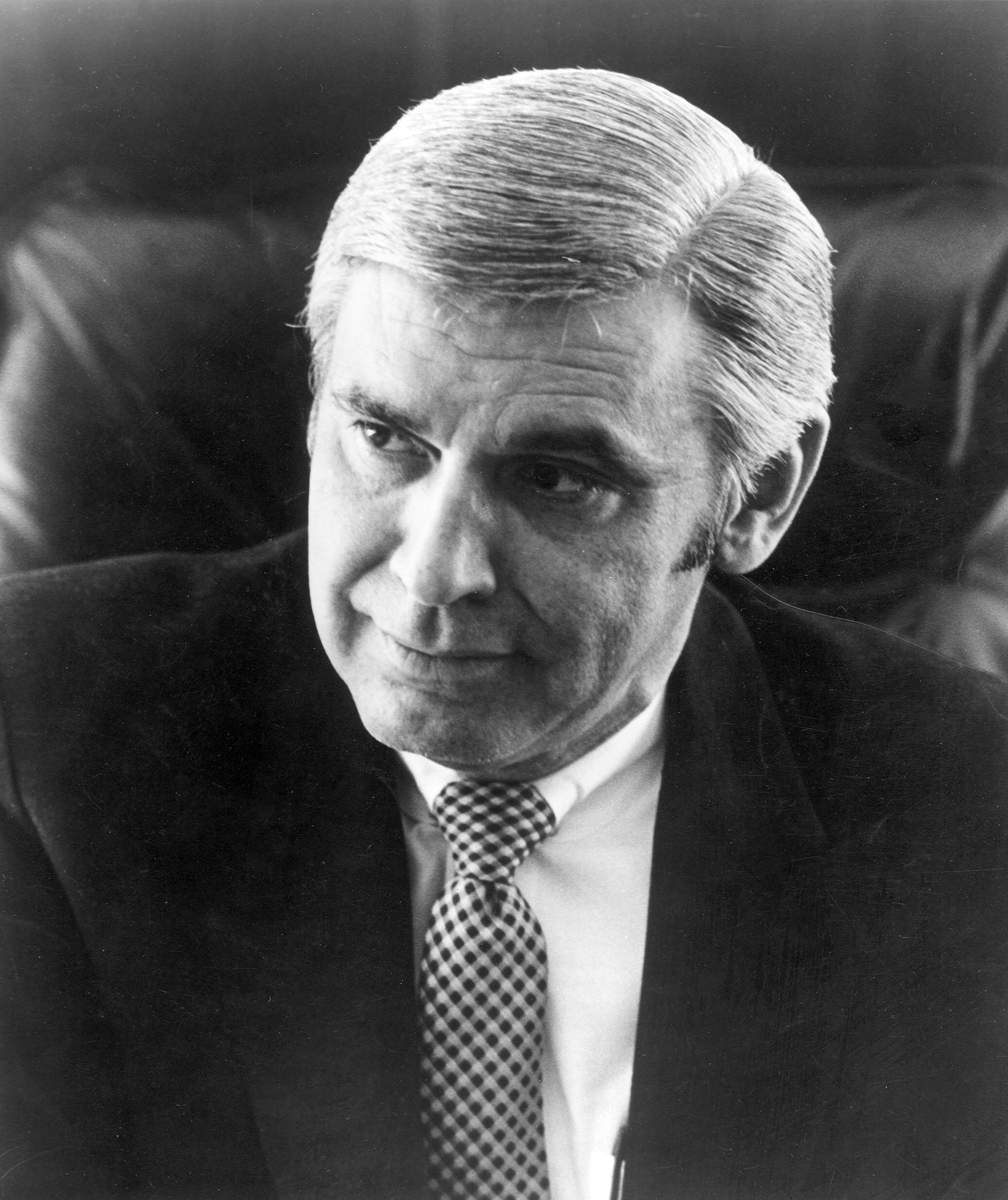
Congressman Leo Ryan

Leo Ryan, who represented California's 11th congressional district, was friends with the father of Bob Houston, a Temple member in California whose mutilated body was found near train tracks on October 5, 1976, three days after a taped telephone conversation with Houston's ex-wife in which leaving the Temple was discussed. Over the following months, Ryan's interest was further aroused by the allegations put forth by Stoen, Layton and the Concerned Relatives.

On November 14, 1978, Ryan flew to Georgetown, along with a delegation that included:

- Jackie Speier, Ryan's then-legal adviser;
- Neville Annibourne, representing Guyana's Ministry of Information;
- Richard Dwyer, Deputy Chief of Mission of the U.S. embassy to Guyana;
- Tim Reiterman, San Francisco Examiner reporter;
- Greg Robinson, Examiner photographer;
- Don Harris, NBC reporter;
- Bob Brown, NBC camera operator;
- Steve Sung, NBC audio technician;
- Bob Flick, NBC producer;
- Charles Krause, Washington Post reporter;
- Ron Javers, San Francisco Chronicle reporter;

and Concerned Relatives representatives, including:

- Tim and Grace Stoen,
- Steve and Anthony Katsaris,
- Beverly Oliver,
- Jim Cobb,
- Sherwin Harris,
- Carol Houston Boyd.

=== Visits to Jonestown ===
==== November 17, 1978 ====
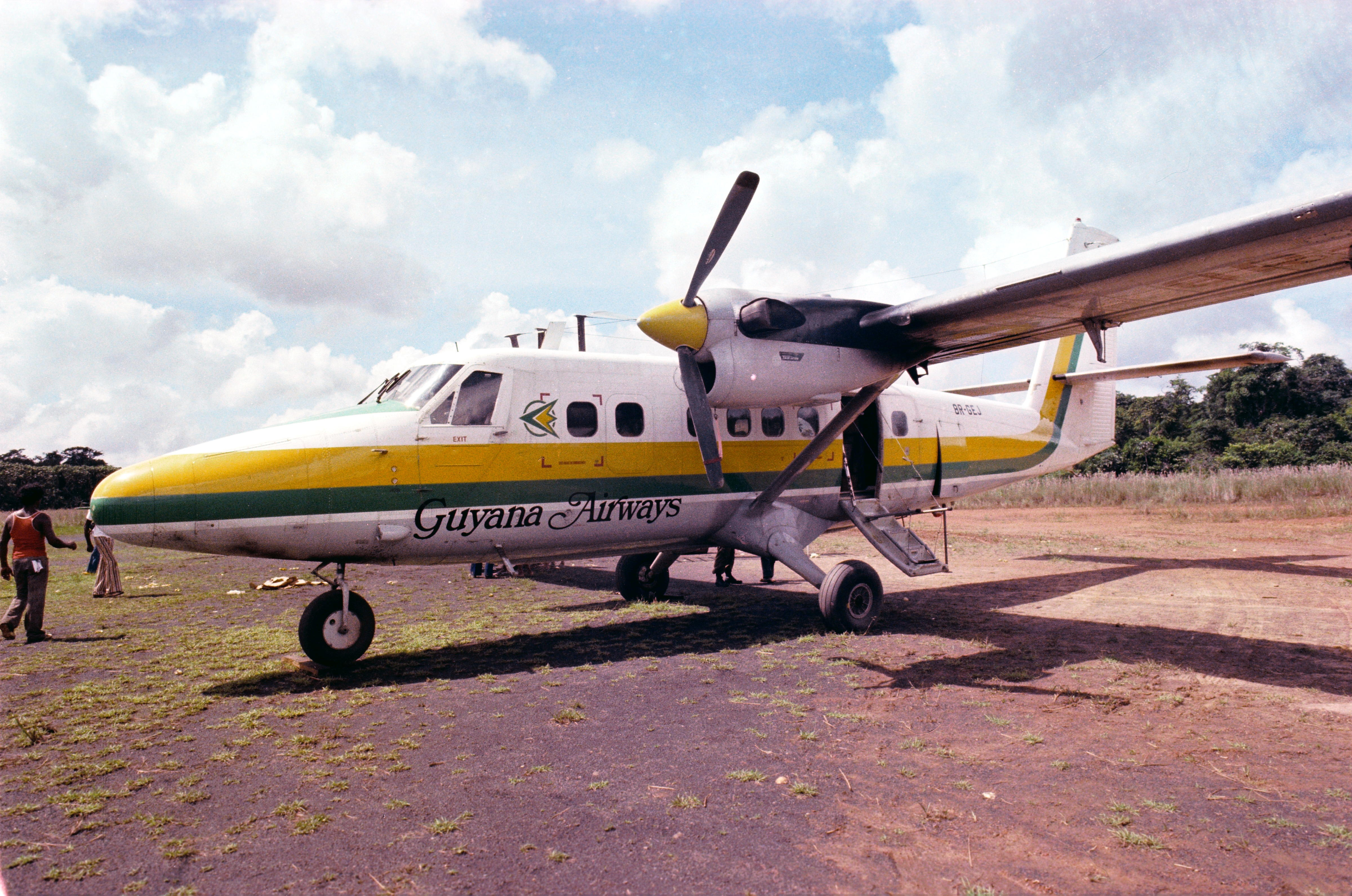
Photo of the DHC-6 Twin Otter before attack

When the Ryan delegation arrived in Guyana, Jones's attorneys Lane and Garry initially refused to allow them access to Jonestown. However, by the morning of November 17, they informed Jones that Ryan would likely leave for Jonestown that afternoon regardless of his willingness. Ryan's party, accompanied by Lane and Garry, came to an airstrip at Port Kaituma, six miles (10 km) from Jonestown, some hours later. Because of lack of room on the plane, only four of the Concerned Relatives – Anthony Katsaris, Beverly Oliver, Jim Cobb and Carol Boyd – accompanied Ryan, Speier and the journalists to Port Kaituma and ultimately to Jonestown. It was felt that the presence of the Stoens would unnecessarily antagonize Jones, and Harris wanted to remain in Georgetown because he hoped to spend time with his daughter Liane, who was staying at the Temple's headquarters there.

Only Ryan, Speier, Lane and Garry were initially accepted into Jonestown, while the rest of Ryan's party was allowed in after sunset. That night, they attended a musical reception in the pavilion. While the party was received warmly, Jones said he felt like a dying man and ranted about government conspiracies and martyrdom as he decried attacks by the press and his enemies. It was later reported – and verified by audio tapes recovered by investigators – that Jones had run rehearsals on how to convince Ryan's delegation that everyone was happy and in good spirits.

Two Temple members, Vernon Gosney and Monica Bagby, made the first move for defection that night. In the pavilion, Gosney mistook NBC reporter Don Harris for Ryan and passed him a note, reading, "Dear Congressman, Vernon Gosney and Monica Bagby. Please help us get out of Jonestown." A child nearby witnessed Gosney's act and verbally alerted other Temple members. Harris brought two notes, one of them Gosney's, to Ryan and Speier. According to Speier in 2006, reading the notes caused her and the congressman to realize that "something was very, very wrong."

Ryan, Speier, Dwyer and Annibourne stayed the night in Jonestown while other members of their party, including the press corps and members of Concerned Relatives, were told that they had to find other accommodations. They went back to Port Kaituma and stayed at a small café.

==== November 18, 1978 ====
In the early morning of November 18, eleven Temple members sensed danger enough to walk out of Jonestown and all the way to the town of Matthew's Ridge, in the opposite direction from the Port Kaituma airstrip. Those defectors included the wife and son of Joe Wilson, Jonestown's head of security. When journalists and members of the Concerned Relatives arrived in Jonestown later that day, Jones's wife Marceline gave them a tour of the settlement.

That afternoon, the Parks and the Bogue families, along with Christopher O'Neal (who was the boyfriend of one of the Parks' daughters) and Harold Cordell (who was living with Mrs. Bogue), stepped forward and asked to be escorted out of Jonestown by the Ryan delegation. When Jones's adopted son Johnny attempted to talk Jerry Parks out of leaving, Parks told him, "No way, it's nothing but a communist prison camp." Jones gave the two families, along with Gosney and Bagby, permission to leave. Before leaving, Gosney was forced to sign a statement stating that he was leaving his four-year-old son behind of his own free will. When Harris handed Gosney's note to Jones during an interview in the pavilion, Jones stated that the defectors were lying and wanted to destroy Jonestown.

After a sudden violent rainstorm started, emotional scenes developed between family members. Al Simon, a Native American Temple member, attempted to take two of his children to Ryan to process the requisite paperwork for transfer back to the U.S. Simon's wife, Bonnie, summoned over the speakers by Temple staff, loudly denounced her husband. Simon pleaded with Bonnie to return to the U.S., but Bonnie rejected his suggestions.

== Port Kaituma airstrip murders ==
Port Kaituma airstrip shootings
- NBC footage taken by Bob Brown, showing gunmen exiting a tractor and trailer at the airstrip
- Location: Port Kaituma Airport, Guyana
- Date: November 18, 1978; 5:20–5:25 p.m. (UTC-4)
- Target: Congressman Leo Ryan and party; defectors from the Peoples Temple at Jonestown
- Attack type: Assassination; Mass shooting
- Weapons: Handguns, shotguns, rifles
- Deaths: 5, including U.S. representative Leo Ryan
- Injuries: 11
- Perpetrators: Larry Layton (Cessna attack), Peoples Temple "Red Brigade" (attack on Twin Otter)

While most of Ryan's party began to depart on a large dump truck to the Port Kaituma airstrip, Ryan and Dwyer stayed behind in Jonestown to process any additional defectors. Shortly before the dump truck left, Temple loyalist Larry Layton, the brother of Deborah Layton, demanded to join the group. Several defectors voiced their suspicions about Larry's motives.

Shortly after the dump truck initially departed, Temple member Don "Ujara" Sly grabbed Ryan while wielding a knife. While Ryan was unhurt after others wrestled Sly to the ground, Dwyer strongly suggested that the congressman leave Jonestown while he filed a criminal complaint against Sly. Ryan did so, promising to return later to address the dispute. The truck departing to the airstrip had stopped after the passengers heard of the attack on Ryan, and took him as a passenger before continuing its journey towards the airstrip.

The entourage had originally scheduled a nineteen-passenger Twin Otter from Guyana Airways to fly them back to Georgetown. Because of the defectors departing Jonestown, the group grew in number and now an additional aircraft was required. Accordingly, the U.S. embassy arranged for a second plane, a six-passenger Cessna. When the entourage reached the airstrip between 4:30 p.m. and 4:45 p.m., the planes had not appeared as scheduled. The group had to wait until the aircraft landed at approximately 5:10 p.m. Then the boarding process began.

Larry was a passenger on the Cessna, the first aircraft to set up for takeoff. After the Cessna had taxied to the far end of the airstrip, he produced a handgun and started shooting at the passengers. He wounded Bagby and Gosney, and tried to kill Dale Parks, who disarmed him after the gun misfired.

Meanwhile, some passengers had boarded the larger Twin Otter. A tractor with a trailer attached, driven by members of the Temple's Red Brigade security squad, arrived at the airstrip and approached the aircraft. When the tractor neared within approximately 30 feet (9 m) of Ryan's party, at a time roughly concurrent with the shootings on the Cessna, the Red Brigade opened fire with handguns, shotguns and rifles while at least two shooters circled the plane on foot. There were perhaps nine shooters whose identities are not all certainly known, but most sources agree that Wilson, Stanley Gieg, Thomas Kice Sr. and Ronnie Dennis were among them. Jones had instructed Larry Layton, as well as those aboard the tractor, to ensure that none of the members of Ryan's party, nor the defectors, were to leave Jonestown.

External videos
- Q&A interview with Jackie Speier on her book Undaunted: Surviving Jonestown, Summoning Courage, and Fighting Back, November 18, 2018, C-SPAN

The first few seconds of the shooting were captured on U-Matic ENG videotape by NBC cameraman Bob Brown, who was killed along with Robinson, Harris and Temple defector Patricia Parks in the few minutes of shooting. Ryan was killed after being shot more than twenty times. Speier, Reiterman, Katsaris, Steve Sung, Richard Dwyer, Charles Krause, Ron Javers, Carolyn Houston Boyd and Beverly Oliver were the nine injured in and around the Twin Otter. After the shootings, the Cessna's pilot, Tom Fernandez, along with the pilot and co-pilot of the Twin Otter, Captain Guy Spence and First officer Astil Rodwell Paul, as well as the injured Bagby, fled in the Cessna to Georgetown. The damaged Twin Otter and the injured Ryan delegation members were left behind on the airstrip.

== Mass murder and forced suicide ==
Jonestown massacre
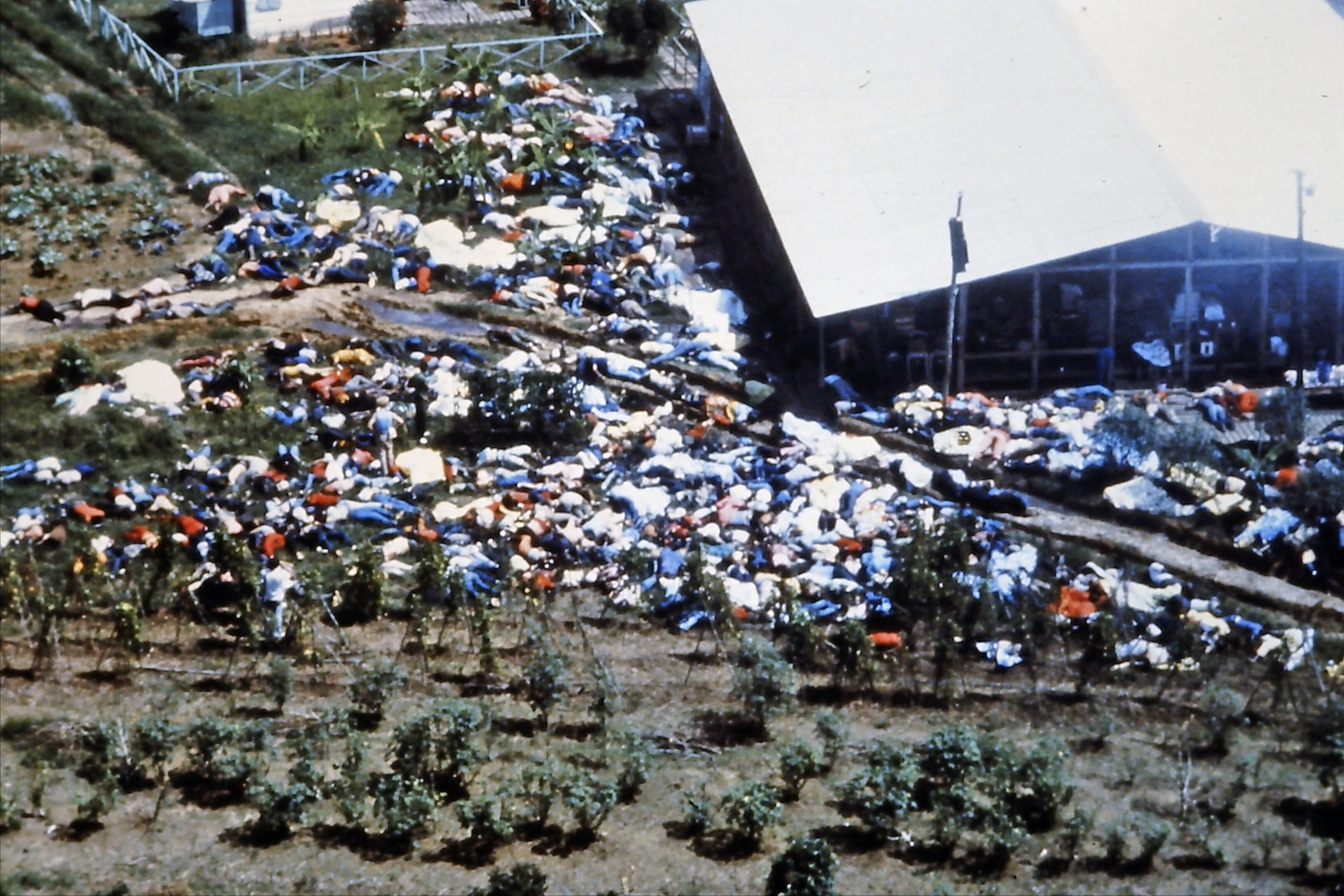
- An aerial view of the dead in Jonestown.
- Date: November 18, 1978
- Target: Members of the Peoples Temple in Jonestown
- Attack type: Mass murder, mass suicide, poisoning
- Weapons: Cyanide-laced Flavor Aid, unspecified firearms
- Deaths: 909 (including 304 children)
- Perpetrators: Jim Jones and other members of the Peoples Temple

Before leaving Jonestown for the airstrip, Ryan had told Garry that he would issue a report that would describe Jonestown "in basically good terms." Ryan stated that none of the sixty relatives he had targeted for interviews wanted to leave, that the fourteen defectors constituted a very small portion of Jonestown's residents, that any sense of imprisonment the defectors had was likely because of peer pressure and a lack of physical transportation and that even if 200 of the 900+ wanted to leave, "I'd still say you have a beautiful place here." Despite Garry's report, Jones told him, "I have failed." Garry reiterated that Ryan would be making a positive report, but Jones maintained that "all is lost."

After Ryan's departure from Jonestown towards Port Kaituma, Marceline made a broadcast on Jonestown's speaker system, giving assurances and asking settlers to return to their homes. During this time, aides prepared a large metal tub with grape Flavor Aid (which was misidentified as Kool-Aid), poisoned with diphenhydramine, promethazine, chlorpromazine, chloroquine, diazepam, chloral hydrate and cyanide.

The concoction was prepared with the help of Jonestown's doctor, Larry Schacht, a former methamphetamine addict who got sober with the help of Jones, who subsequently paid for his college education to become a doctor. Schacht had been researching the best ways for a person to die in advance of the foreseen mass suicide. About thirty minutes after Marceline's announcement, Jones made his own, calling all members immediately to the pavilion.

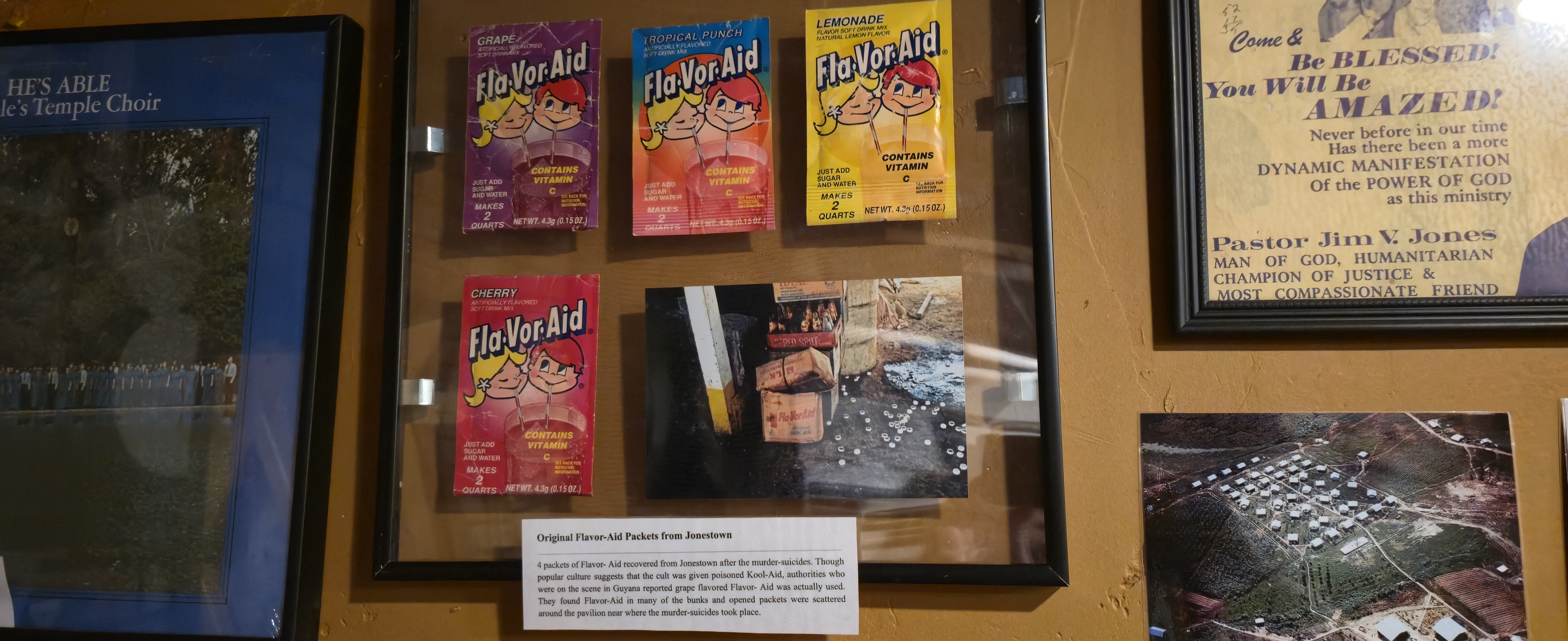
Flavor Aid packets recovered from Jonestown after the murder-suicides, on display at Graveface Museum in Savannah, Georgia

A forty-four-minute cassette tape, known as the "death tape," records part of the meeting Jones called inside the pavilion in the early evening of November 18. When the assembly gathered, referring to the Ryan delegation's journey back to Georgetown, Jones told the gathering:

One of those people on that plane is gonna shoot the pilot, I know that. I didn't plan it but I know it's gonna happen. They're gonna shoot that pilot and down comes the plane into the jungle and we had better not have any of our children left when it's over, because they'll parachute in here on us.

Jones urged Temple members to commit "revolutionary suicide." Such an act had been hypothesized by Jones as far back as the Temple's existence in San Francisco and, according to Jonestown defectors, its theory was "you can go down in history, saying you chose your own way to go, and it is your commitment to refuse capitalism and in support of socialism."

Temple member Christine Miller argued that the Temple should alternatively attempt an airlift to the Soviet Union. Jim McElvane, a former therapist who had arrived in Jonestown only two days earlier, assisted Jones by arguing against Miller's resistance to suicide, stating, "Let's make it a beautiful day" and later citing possible reincarnation. After several exchanges in which Jones argued that a Soviet exodus would not be possible, along with reactions by other Temple members hostile to Miller, she backed down. However, Miller may have ceased dissenting when Jones confirmed at one point that "the congressman has been murdered" after the airstrip shooters returned.

When the Red Brigade members came back to Jonestown after Ryan's murder, Tim Carter, a Vietnam War veteran, recalled them having the "thousand-yard stare" of weary soldiers. After Jones confirmed that "the congressman's dead," no dissent is heard on the death tape. By this point, armed guards had taken up positions surrounding the pavilion. Directly after this, Jones stated that "the Red Brigade's the only one that made any sense anyway," and, "the Red Brigade showed them justice." In addition to McElvane, several other Temple members gave speeches praising Jones and his decision for the community to commit suicide, even after Jones stopped appreciating this praise and begged for the process to go faster.

According to escaped Temple member Odell Rhodes, the first to take the poison were Ruletta Paul and her one-year-old infant. A syringe without a needle fitted was used to squirt poison into the infant's mouth, after which Paul squirted another syringe into her own mouth. Stanley Clayton also witnessed mothers with their babies first approach the tub containing the poison. Clayton said that Jones approached people to encourage them to drink the poison and that, after adults saw the poison begin to take effect, "they showed a reluctance to die."

The poison caused death within five minutes for children, less for babies and an estimated twenty to thirty minutes for adults. After consuming the poison, according to Rhodes, people were then escorted away down a wooden walkway leading outside the pavilion. It is not clear if some initially thought the exercise was another White Night rehearsal. Rhodes reported being in close contact with dying children.

In response to reactions of seeing the poison take effect on others, Jones counseled, "Die with a degree of dignity. Lay down your life with dignity; don't lay down with tears and agony." He also said,

I tell you, I don't care how many screams you hear, I don't care how many anguished cries ... death is a million times preferable to 10 more days of this life. If you knew what was ahead of you – if you knew what was ahead of you, you'd be glad to be stepping over tonight.

Rhodes described a scene of both hysteria and confusion as parents watched their children die from the poison. He also stated that most present "quietly waited their own turn to die" and that many of the assembled Temple members "walked around like they were in a trance." Survivor Tim Carter later suggested that, like a previous practice, that day's lunch of grilled cheese sandwiches may have been tainted with sedatives. The crowd was surrounded by armed guards, offering members the basic dilemma of death by poison or death by a guard's hand. Cries and screams of children and adults are audibly heard on the death tape. As more Temple members died, eventually the guards themselves were called in to die by poison.

Jones was found dead lying next to his chair in the pavilion between two other bodies, his head cushioned by a pillow. His death was caused by a gunshot wound to his left temple that Guyanese Chief Medical Examiner Leslie Mootoo stated was consistent with being self-inflicted.

=== Survivors and eyewitnesses ===
Three high-ranking Temple survivors claimed they were given an assignment and thereby escaped death. Tim Carter and his brother Mike Carter, aged 30 and 20 respectively, and Mike Prokes, aged 31, were given luggage containing $550,000 in U.S. currency, $130,000 in Guyanese currency and an envelope, which they were told to deliver to the Soviet embassy in Georgetown. The envelope contained two passports and three instructional letters, the first of which was to Timofeyev, stating:

Dear Comrade Timofeyev, The following is a letter of instructions regarding all of our assets that we want to leave to the Communist Party of the Union of Soviet Socialist Republics. Enclosed in this letter are letters which instruct the banks to send the cashiers checks to you. I am doing this on behalf of Peoples Temple because we, as communists, want our money to be of benefit for help to oppressed peoples all over the world, or in any way that your decision-making body sees fit.

The letters included listed accounts with balances totaling in excess of $7.3 million to be transferred to the Communist Party of the Soviet Union. Prokes and the Carter brothers soon ditched most of the money and were apprehended heading for a Temple boat at Port Kaituma. It is unknown how they reached Georgetown, 150 miles (240 km) away, since the boat had been sent away earlier that day. The brothers were given the task before the suicides began, and soon abandoned it when they realized what was about to happen; Tim Carter desperately tried to search for his wife and son, discovering his son in time to witness him being poisoned, and his wife killing herself in despair. At this point, Carter had a nervous breakdown and was pulled away from the village by his equally distraught brother.

Jones's sons, Stephan, Jim Jr. and Tim, were in Georgetown with Jonestown's basketball team to play in a tournament with the Guyanese national team. In the moments before the suicide, Jones contacted Stephan with orders to "get revenge" on enemies of the Temple in Georgetown before committing suicide themselves. Stephan not only refused to do so but then contacted the Temple's headquarters in San Francisco and told them not to do anything without his permission.

Just before the start of the final meeting in the pavilion, Garry and Lane were told that the community was angry with them and were escorted to a house used to accommodate visitors. According to them, they talked their way past two armed guards and made it to the jungle, before eventually arriving in Port Kaituma. While in the jungle near the settlement, they heard gunshots. This observation concurs with the testimony of Clayton, who, having previously fled into the jungle, heard the same sounds as he was sneaking back into Jonestown to retrieve his passport. Rhodes volunteered to fetch a stethoscope and hid under a building.

Two more people who were intended to be poisoned managed to survive. Grover Davis, aged 79, who was hard-of-hearing and missed the announcement to assemble on the loudspeaker, lay down in a ditch and pretended to be dead. Hyacinth Thrash, aged 76, realized what was happening, crawled under her bed and fell asleep. She only walked out after the poisonings were completed.

=== Medical examinations ===
The only medical doctor to initially examine the scene at Jonestown was Mootoo, who visually examined over 200 bodies and later told a Guyanese coroner's jury of having seen needle marks on at least seventy. However, no determination was made as to whether those injections initiated the introduction of poison or whether they were so-called "relief" injections to quicken death and reduce suffering from convulsions from those who had previously taken poison orally. Mootoo and U.S. pathologist Lynn Crook determined that cyanide was present in some bodies, while analysis of the contents of the vat revealed several tranquilizers as well as potassium cyanide and potassium chloride.

Plastic cups, Flavor Aid packets and syringes, some with needles and some without, littered the area where the bodies were found. Mootoo concluded that a gunshot wound to Annie Moore could not have been self-inflicted, though Moore had also ingested a lethal dose of cyanide.

Guyanese authorities waived their requirement for autopsies in the case of unnatural death. Doctors in the U.S. performed autopsies on only seven bodies, including those of Jones, Moore, Schacht and Carolyn Layton. Moore and Layton were selected among those autopsied, in part, because of the urging of the Moore family, including Rebecca Moore, the sister of the two victims, who was not a Temple member herself.

=== Notes from deceased residents ===
Found near Marceline Jones's body was a typewritten note, dated November 18, 1978, signed by Marceline and witnessed by Moore and Maria Katsaris, stating:

I, Marceline Jones, leave all bank assets in my name to the Communist Party of the USSR. The above bank accounts are located in the Bank of Nova Scotia in Nassau, Bahamas.

Please be sure that these assets do get to the USSR. I especially request that none of these are allowed to get into the hands of my adopted daughter, Suzanne Jones Cartmell.

For anyone who finds this letter, please honor this request as it is most important to myself and my husband James W. Jones.

Moore also left a note, which in part stated: "I am at a point right now so embittered against the world that I don't know why I am writing this. Someone who finds it will believe I am crazy or believe in the barbed wire that does NOT exist in Jonestown." The last line, "We died because you would not let us live in peace," is written in different color ink. No other specific reference is made to the events of the day. Moore also wrote, "JONESTOWN – the most peaceful, loving community that ever existed."

In addition, she stated, "JIM JONES – the one who made this paradise possible – much to the contrary of the lies stated about Jim Jones being a power-hungry sadistic, mean person who thought he was God – of all things." And "His hatred of racism, sexism, elitism, and mainly classism, is what prompted him to make a new world for the people – a paradise in the jungle. The children loved it. So did everyone else."

Found near Carolyn Layton's body was a handwritten note signed by Layton, witnessed by Katsaris and Moore, dated November 18, 1978, stating, "This is my last will and testament. I hereby leave all assets in any bank account to which I am a signatory to the Communist Party of the USSR."

== Murder and forced-suicide in Georgetown ==
In the early evening of November 18, at the Temple's headquarters in Georgetown, Temple member Sharon Amos received a radio communication from Jonestown instructing the members in Georgetown to take revenge on the Temple's enemies and then commit revolutionary suicide. Later, after police arrived at the Georgetown premises, Amos escorted her children, Liane (21), Christa (11) and Martin (10), into a bathroom. Wielding a kitchen knife, Amos first killed Christa and then Martin. Then Liane assisted Amos in cutting her own throat, after which Liane killed herself. Jones's sons Stephan, Tim and Jim Jr. later found the bodies.

== Aftermath ==
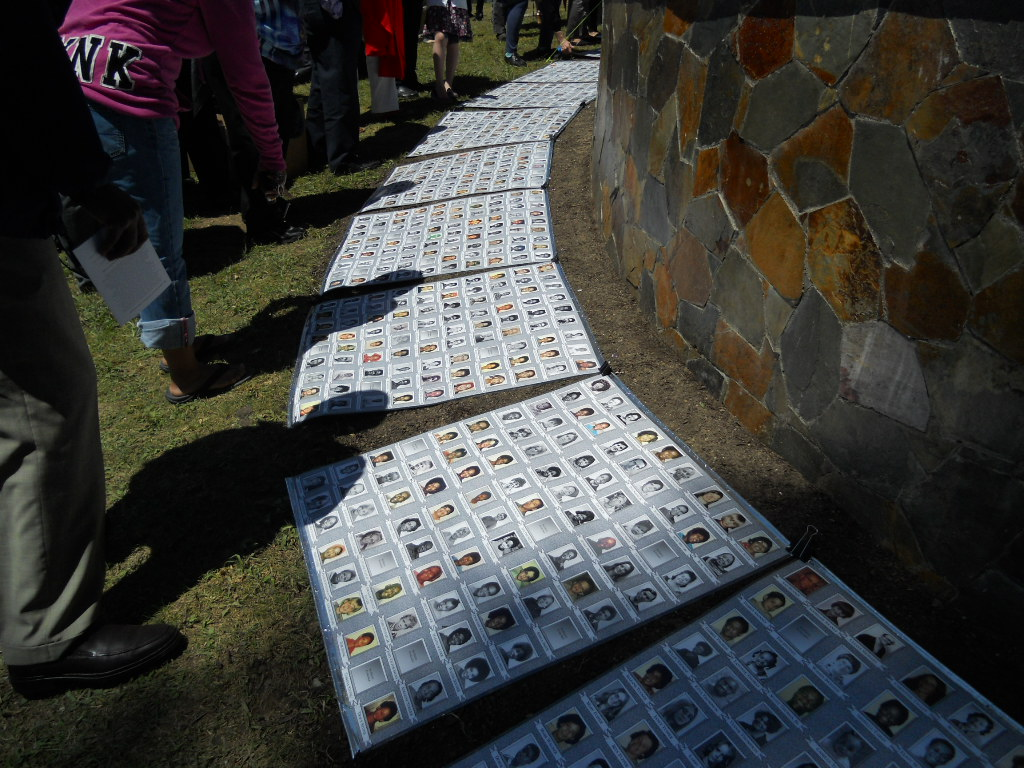
Pictures of those who died in Jonestown laid out at a 2011 memorial service

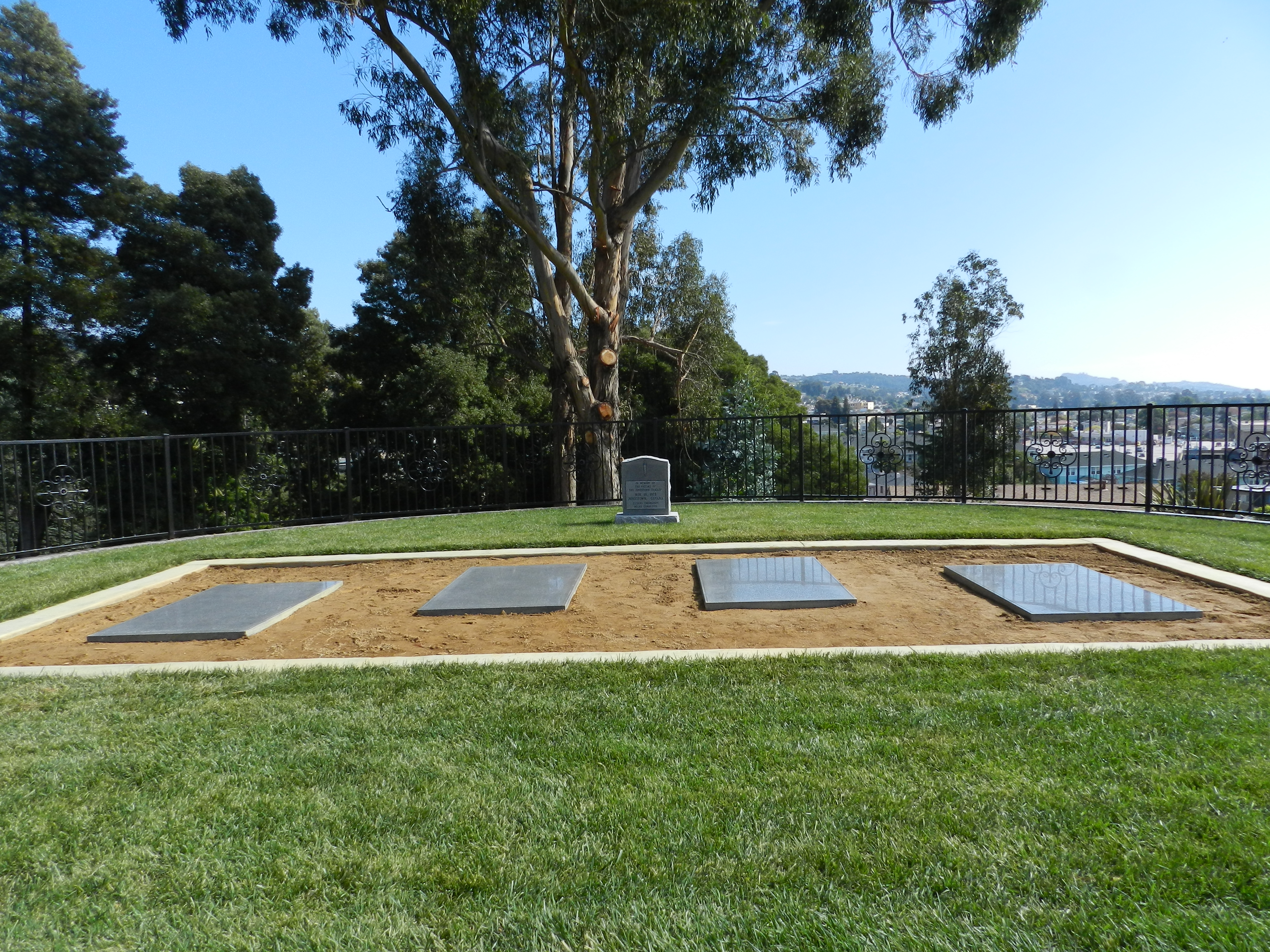
The grave site at Evergreen Cemetery in Oakland, California, and the memorial plaques

At Port Kaituma, Reiterman photographed the aftermath of the airstrip shootings. Dwyer assumed leadership at the scene and, at his recommendation, Larry Layton was arrested by Guyanese police. Dwyer had been grazed by a bullet in his buttock during the shootings. It took several hours before the eleven wounded and others in their party gathered themselves together. Most of them spent the night in the Port Kaituma café. The more seriously wounded slept in a small tent at the airstrip. A Guyanese government plane arrived the following morning to evacuate the wounded.

Five teenage members of the Parks and Bogue families, with one boyfriend, followed the instructions of defector Gerald Parks to hide in the adjacent jungle until help arrived and their safety was assured. Thereafter, that group was lost for three days in the jungle and nearly died. One of them, Thom Bogue, had been wounded in the leg. Guyanese soldiers eventually rescued them.

After escaping Jonestown, Rhodes arrived in Port Kaituma on the night of November 18. That night, Clayton stayed with a local Guyanese family and travelled to Port Kaituma the next morning. Prokes and the Carter brothers were put into protective custody in Port Kaituma; they were later released in Georgetown. Rhodes, Clayton, Garry and Lane were also brought to Georgetown. Prokes died by suicide on March 14, 1979, during a press conference, four months after the Jonestown incident.

914 of the 918 dead, including Jones himself, were collected by the U.S. military in Guyana, then transported by military cargo plane to Dover Air Force Base in Delaware, a location that had been used previously for mass processing of the dead from the Tenerife airport disaster. The last shipment of bodies arrived early on the morning of November 27. The base's mortuary was tasked with fingerprinting, identifying and processing the bodies. The base's resources were overwhelmed, and numerous individuals tasked with moving or identifying the bodies suffered symptoms of post-traumatic stress disorder. In many cases, responsibility for cremation of the remains was distributed to Dover area funeral homes.

In August 2014, the never-claimed cremated remains of nine people from Jonestown were found in a former funeral home in Dover. As of September 2014, four of their remains had been returned to next-of-kin, and the remaining five had not. Those five were publicly identified in the hope that family would claim their remains; all five remain unclaimed by family and have been interred at the Jonestown Memorial at Evergreen Cemetery in Oakland, California, along with the remains of approximately half of those who perished on November 18, 1978.

Larry Layton, who had fired a gun at several people aboard the Cessna, was initially found not guilty of attempted murder in a Guyanese court, employing the defense that he was "brainwashed." Acquittal in a Guyanese court did not free Layton, however, who was promptly deported back to the U.S. and arrested by the U.S. Marshals Service upon arrival in San Francisco. Layton could not be tried in the U.S. for the attempted murders of Gosney, Bagby, Dale Parks and the Cessna pilot on Guyanese soil and was, instead, tried under a federal statute against assassinating members of Congress and internationally protected people (Ryan and Dwyer). He was convicted of conspiracy and of aiding and abetting the murder of Ryan and of the attempted murder of Dwyer. Paroled in 2002 with the help of positive testimony from one of the people he wounded at the airstrip, Layton is the only person ever to have been held criminally responsible for the events at Jonestown.

The events at Jonestown were covered heavily by the media, and photographs pertaining to it adorned newspaper and magazine covers for months after its occurrence. The Peoples Temple was labeled a "cult of death" by both Time and Newsweek magazines. In February 1979, 98% of Americans polled said that they had heard of the tragedy. George Gallup stated that "few events, in fact, in the entire history of the Gallup Poll have been known to such a high percentage of the U.S. public."

After the deaths, both the House Committee on Foreign Affairs and the State Department itself criticized the latter's handling of the Temple. Guyanese political opposition seized the opportunity to embarrass Burnham by establishing an inquest which concluded that the prime minister was responsible for the deaths at Jonestown.

The Cult Awareness Network (CAN), a group aimed at deprogramming members of cults, was formed soon after the deaths at Jonestown. The group, which included Ryan's daughter Patricia, was involved in various personal, social and legal battles with a range of religious organizations, from The Family International and Scientology to David Koresh's Branch Davidians, where they were found to be influential on law enforcement's concerns for children in the eventual Waco siege in 1993. After a slew of legal and fiscal issues, CAN went bankrupt in 1996.

In late February 1980, Al and Jeannie Mills (co-founders of the Concerned Relatives) and their daughter Daphene were shot and killed execution style in their Berkeley, California, home. Eddie Mills, their son, was believed to be involved to the extent that he was arrested in 2005, but charges were not filed against him. The case has not been solved. In 1984, former Temple member Tyrone Mitchell, who had lost both of his parents and five siblings at Jonestown, fired upon students at a Los Angeles elementary school from his second-story window, killing two people and injuring twelve; Mitchell then turned his weapon on himself and committed suicide.

The sheer scale of the event, as well as Jones's socialism, purported inconsistencies in the reported number of deaths, allegedly poor explanation of events related to said deaths and existence of classified documents led some conspiracy theorists to suggest CIA involvement, including a Soviet-published book a decade later. The House Permanent Select Committee on Intelligence investigated the event and announced that there was no evidence of CIA involvement at Jonestown. Others suggested KGB involvement, beyond the attested visits of Soviet diplomatic personnel to Jonestown and the overtures made by Jim Jones to the USSR.

The bodies of over 400 of those who died are buried in a mass grave at Evergreen Cemetery in Oakland, California. In 2011, a memorial to them was erected at the cemetery.

The Jonestown tragedy has led to the phrase "drinking the Kool-Aid", referring to a person or group holding an unquestioned belief, argument, or philosophy without critical examination. However, it's not clear whether Kool-Aid or Flavor Aid was used, as both were present at Jonestown.

=== Conspiracy theories ===
According to religious studies scholar Rebecca Moore, "In the twenty-three years since the deaths in Jonestown, conspiracy theories have blossomed in number and sophistication."

In 1979, Joseph Hollinger, a former aide to Ryan, claimed that Jonestown was a "mass mind control experiment" conducted by the CIA. A 1980 newspaper column by Jack Anderson also claimed that the CIA was involved in the massacre, and speculated that Dwyer had ties to the agency. In 1980, an investigation by the United States House Permanent Select Committee on Intelligence found no evidence of CIA activity in Jonestown.

In 1987, The Jonestown Carnage: A CIA Crime (1978) (Russian: Гибель Джонстауна – преступление ЦРУ) was published in the Soviet Union, claiming that group members were assassinated by CIA agents and mercenaries to prevent further political emigration from the U.S. as well as suppress opposition to the U.S. regime. Political scientist Janos Radvanyi cites the book as an example of Soviet active measures during the 1980s that "spread both disinformation stories and enemy propaganda against the United States," adding, "It's hard to imagine that anyone could believe so ridiculous a story."

== Former site ==
Now deserted, the compound at Jonestown was initially tended by the Guyanese government following the deaths. The government then allowed its re-occupation by Hmong refugees from Laos for a few years in the early 1980s. The buildings and grounds were looted by local Guyanese but were not taken over because of their association with the mass killing. The buildings were mostly destroyed by a fire in the mid-1980s, after which the ruins were left to decay and be reclaimed by the jungle.

During a visit to tape a segment for the ABC news show 20/20 in 1998, Jim Jones Jr. discovered the rusting remains of an oil drum near the former entrance to the pavilion. Jones recognized the drum, originally adapted for use during meal times, as the drum used for drink mixtures during the White Night exercises, and which he believed was used to hold the beverage mix of poison and grape-flavored punch during the massacre.

In 2003, with the help of Gerry Gouveia, a pilot involved with the Jonestown cleanup, a television crew recording a special for the 25th anniversary of the event returned to the site to uncover any remaining artifacts. Although the site was covered with dense vegetation, the team uncovered a standing cassava mill (possibly the largest remaining structure), the remains of a tractor (speculated to be the same tractor used by the airstrip shooters), a generator, a filing cabinet, a truck near the site of Jones's house, a fuel pump, and other smaller miscellaneous items. Gouveia also led the team to the former site of the pavilion, where they found the remains of a steel drum, an organ, and a bed of daisies growing where the bodies once lay.

In December 2024, it was announced that there were plans to open the old site as a tourist attraction, with the first tourists scheduled to arrive in January 2025, paying $650 per person. The scheme is supported by the Guyanese government. The move to open the Jonestown site for tourism was opposed by several Guyanese figures, including University of Guyana lecturer Neville Bissember and former spokesperson of the Government of Guyana during the Jonestown massacre Kit Nascimento.

== See also ==
Media depictions:

- Guyana Tragedy: The Story of Jim Jones, a 1980 television movie based on the life of Jim Jones and the Peoples Temple
- Guyana: Cult of the Damned, a 1979 exploitation film based on the Jonestown tragedy
- Jonestown: Paradise Lost, a 2007 documentary broadcast on The History Channel
- Jonestown: The Life and Death of Peoples Temple, a 2006 documentary film
- The Sacrament (2013 film), a thriller whose plot borrows heavily from the events of Jonestown
- Seconds from Disaster, a documentary television series that covered the events at Jonestown in Season 6, Episode 2 ("Jonestown Cult Suicide"; 5 November 2012)

Mass suicides:

- Puputan, mass ritual suicide in Bali, Indonesia (1771–1773, 1849, 1906, 1908, and 1946)
- Heaven's Gate in San Diego, California (1997)
- Order of the Solar Temple in Canada and Switzerland (1994, 1995, and 1997)
- Movement for the Restoration of the Ten Commandments of God in Uganda (2000)
- Shakahola Forest incident in Kilifi County, Kenya (2023)
- Sinasa massacre, mass poisoning and massacre in Davao City, Philippines (1985)

Additional:

- List of members of the United States Congress killed or wounded in office
- Suicide in Guyana

== General and cited references ==
- Hall, John R (1987). Gone from the Promised Land: Jonestown in American Cultural History. New Brunswick, New Jersey: Transaction Publishers. ISBN 978-0887381249.
- Layton, Deborah (1998). Seductive Poison. New York: Anchor Books. ISBN 978-0385489843.
- Moore, Rebecca (1985). A Sympathetic History of Jonestown: the Moore Family Involvement in Peoples Temple. Lewiston, New York: Edwin Mellen Press. ISBN 978-0889468603.
- Reiterman, Tim; Jacobs, John (1982). Raven: The Untold Story of Rev. Jim Jones and His People. Dutton. ISBN 978-0525241362.
