= Municipal code =

Municipal code may refer to:

- Community Identification Number, a number sequence for the identification of politically independent municipalities or unincorporated areas
- Legal code (municipal)
- Municipal ordinances, laws that are enacted and enforced by a village, town, city or county government
- Gemeindeordnung, the municipal code in German law
