= Ben Rosenthal (politician) =

American politician (1898–1953)

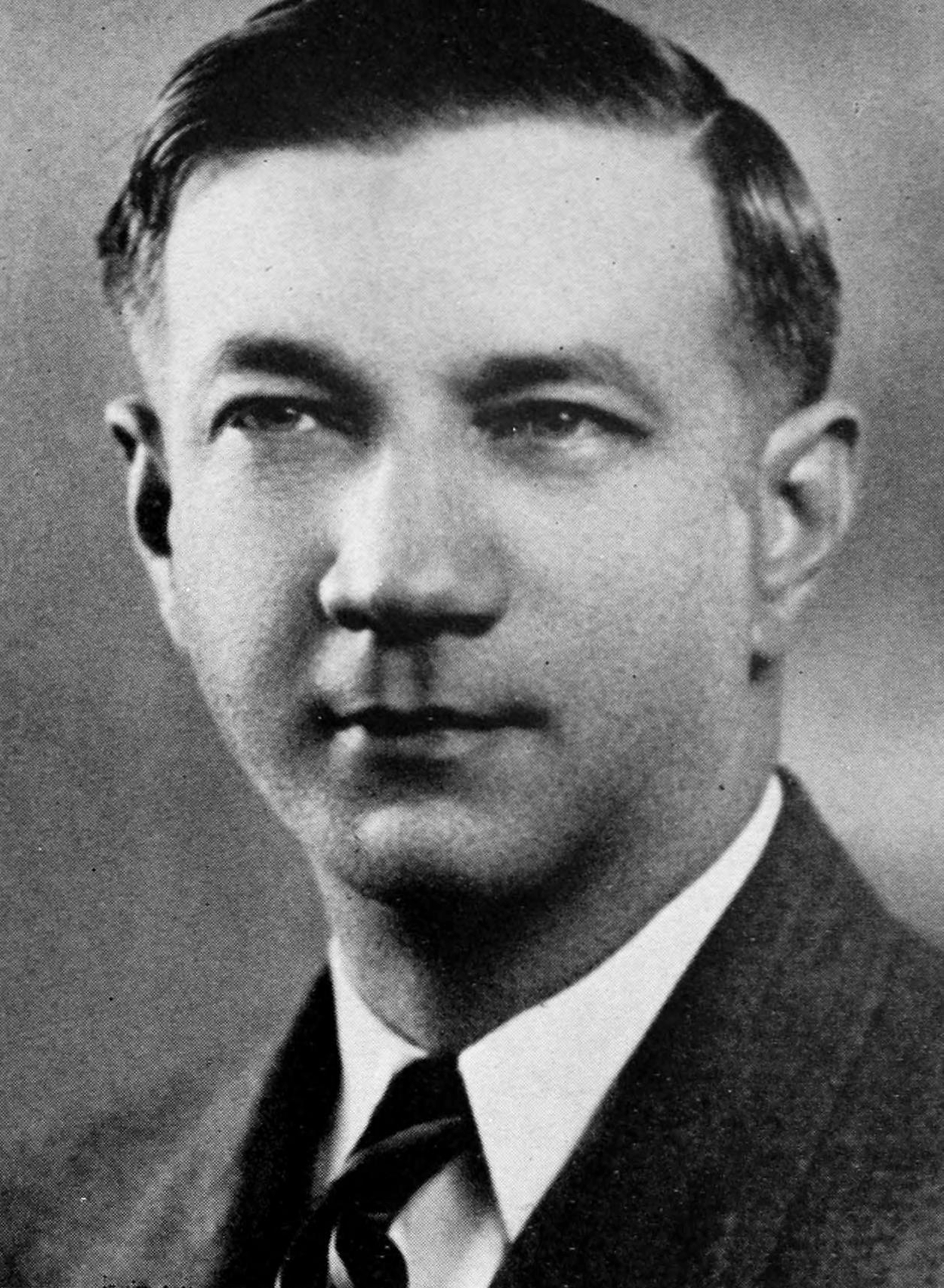
- Rosenthal c. 1934

Presiding Judge of the Los Angeles Municipal Court
- In office February 2, 1953 – May 24, 1953
- Preceded by: Louis W. Kaufman
- Succeeded by: Eugene P. Fay

Judge of the Los Angeles Municipal Court
- In office June 3, 1940 – May 24, 1953
- Appointed by: Culbert Olson
- Preceded by: Charles A. Ballreich
- Succeeded by: John Aiso

Member of the California State Assembly from the 52nd district
- In office January 7, 1935 – May 29, 1940
- Preceded by: Charles W. Grubbs
- Succeeded by: William H. Poole

Personal details
- Born: March 27, 1898 Brooklyn, New York, U.S.
- Died: May 24, 1953 (aged 55) Los Angeles, California, U.S.
- Resting place: Hillside Memorial Park Cemetery
- Party: Democratic
- Spouse: Rebecca B. Mass (m. 1927)
- Children: Gloria
- Relatives: William H. Rosenthal (brother)
- Education: Southwestern Law School (L.L.B.)

Military service
- Allegiance: United Kingdom
- Branch/service: British Army
- Years of service: 1918–1920
- Rank: Private
- Unit: 38th Battalion, Royal Fusiliers
- Battles/wars: World War I; Western Front; Palestine Campaign

Ben Rosenthal (March 27, 1898 – May 24, 1953) was a Jewish-American lawyer and politician who served in the California State Assembly for the 52nd district from 1935 to 1940, then as a judge of the Los Angeles Municipal Court from 1940 until his death in 1953. Three months prior, he had been elected presiding judge.

== Early life ==
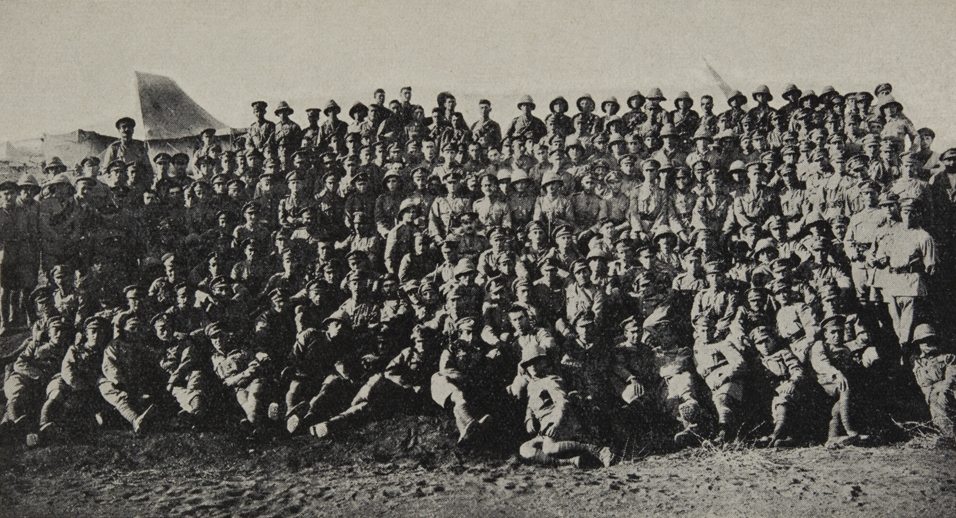
Rosenthal's unit, the 38th Battalion of the Royal Fusiliers, in Palestine, 1918

Ben Rosenthal was born on March 27, 1898 in Brooklyn, New York. His parents, Rachel (née Oxhandler) and Harris Rosenthal, were Polish Jews who emigrated from the Russian Empire. Rosenthal attended high school in Brooklyn and joined the Zionist Organization of America at 18. During World War I, he served in the Ordnance Department of the Brooklyn Navy Yard before enlisting in the Jewish Legion of the British Army. His unit, the 38th Battalion of the Royal Fusiliers, saw service in France and Palestine.

After the war, Rosenthal and his family moved to California. He graduated from Southwestern Law School with an L.L.B. in 1925 and was admitted to the California State Bar the next year. He served as a deputy Los Angeles city prosecutor from 1930 to 1933. His brother William would follow a similar career path, graduating from Southwestern and working as a deputy city attorney before his own election to the State Assembly in 1942 and appointment to the Los Angeles Municipal Court in 1959.

== Political career ==
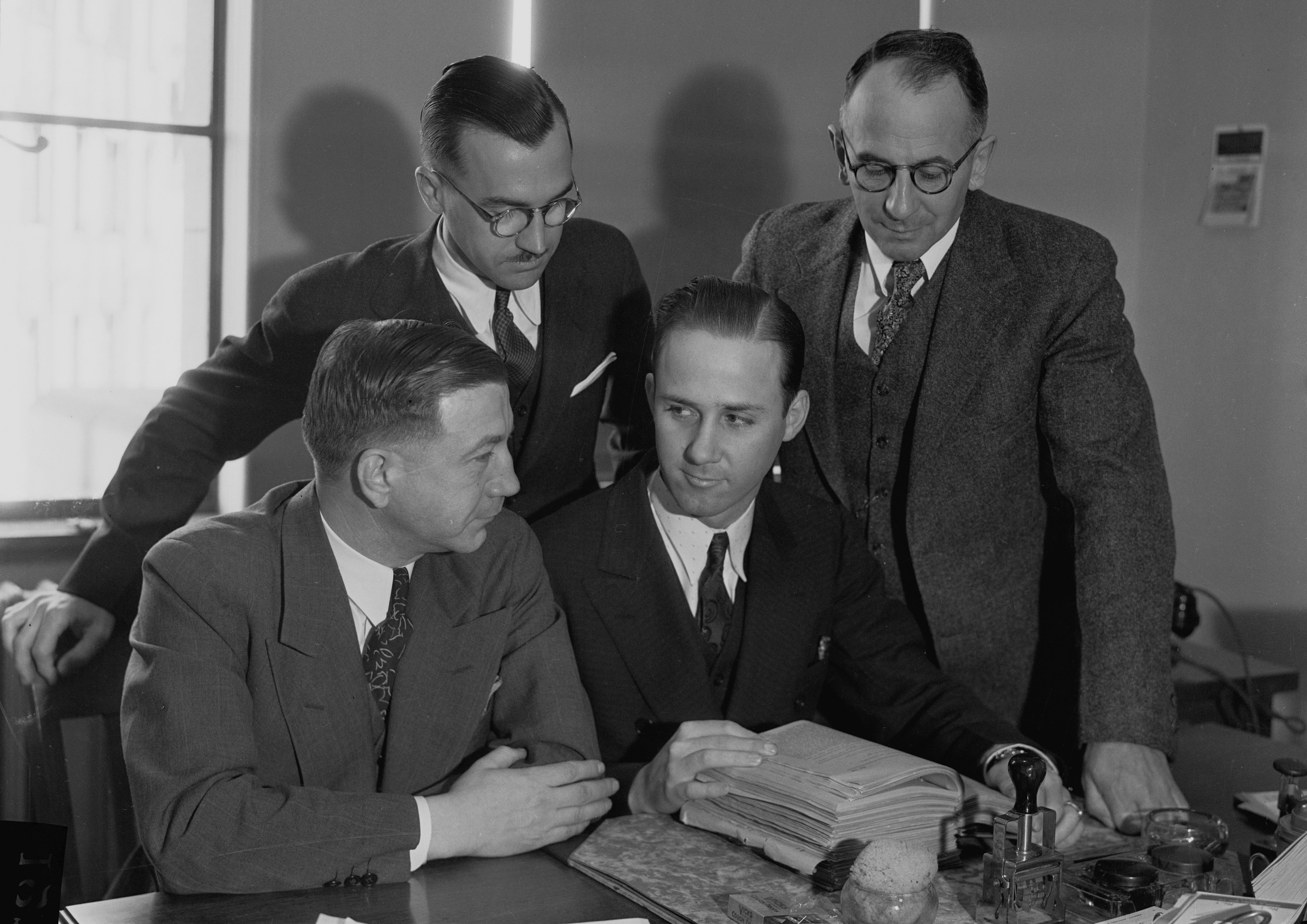
Rosenthal (seated, left) and other assemblymen assess the value of oil in state-owned tidelands, 1936

Rosenthal was one of two dozen "EPIC Democrats" elected to the state legislature in 1934. He defeated incumbent assemblyman Charles W. Grubbs in the Democratic primary and Republican Olin Price in the general election. Rosenthal became chairman of the ways and means committee and authored legislation that would have established compulsory universal health insurance.

During the 1936 Democratic Party presidential primaries, Rosenthal joined an EPIC slate nominally pledged to Upton Sinclair for president; they actually supported Franklin D. Roosevelt, but opposed U.S. Senator William Gibbs McAdoo, who headed the president's slate. The EPIC slate lost to Roosevelt's by a margin of eight to one.

=== Tenney Committee ===
In 1948, the California State Senate's "Tenney Committee" attacked Rosenthal as a Communist sympathizer, citing his leadership of the American Jewish Congress, support for Harry Bridges and the Abraham Lincoln Brigade, and opposition to the California Criminal Syndicalism Act and the committee itself. In a Los Angeles Times article published shortly after, Rosenthal denied membership in the Communist Party and dismissed the report as "stupid" and "characteristic of Mr. Tenney and his line." In a later publication, Rosenthal elaborated that, while many of Tenney's charges were true, none of them necessarily made him a Communist, and in fact Tenney himself had been previously involved in such activities. In closing, Rosenthal stated:

I have always felt that the Tenneys, the Thomases and the Rankins, and all those that would do their bidding in the name of fighting Communism, would root out all progressive and liberal thought. They are the ones who would condemn people for the company they keep, and thus violate the fundamental principles of American criminal law of personal guilt by which men may be convicted of wrong doing. They are the ones who, in the name of fighting Communism, would adopt the worst features of totalitarianism, and suppress free and democratic thought.

== Death ==
Rosenthal died of a heart attack at his home in West Los Angeles on May 24, 1953. More than 1,500 people attended his funeral at the Sinai Temple, with eulogies delivered by former governor Culbert Olson, superior court judge Stanley Mosk, and attorney Joseph Scott. He was succeeded by John Aiso, the first Japanese-American appointed a judge in the contiguous United States.
