= Taing Sunlay =

Taing Sunlay is the director of the Phnom Penh, Cambodia Municipal Court. He replaced Ang Mealaktei, who was sacked after only one year due to corruption charges.
