= California's 44th district =

California's 44th district may refer to:

- California's 44th congressional district
- California's 44th State Assembly district
