= Lindsay Imber =

American stadium organist (born 1988)

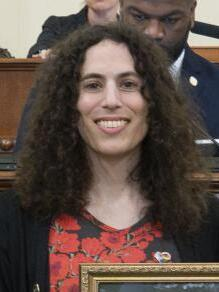
- Imber in 2025
- Born: February 16, 1988 (age 38); Los Angeles, California
- Occupations: Organist; umpire; rules analyst
- Organization(s): Anaheim Ducks, NHL
- Title: House Organist, Honda Center Owner, Close Call Sports
- Website: CloseCallSports.com

Lindsay Imber born February 16, 1988 is an American musician who is the stadium organist for the National Hockey League's Anaheim Ducks.

== Early life ==
Imber grew up in the Los Angeles area and began training classically in piano at the age of seven. She attended Harvard-Westlake School. After graduating from UC Irvine with degrees in social ecology and criminology, law, and society, Imber obtained a security statistics job with Major League Baseball's Los Angeles Dodgers organization. While working for the Dodgers, she became a self-taught organist, using the Dodgers' Roland Atelier AT-80s organ as a practice instrument.

Imber's early professional sports experience includes filling in for 27-year Dodgers organist Nancy Bea Hefley when she was absent from games in Los Angeles.

== Anaheim Ducks organist ==
When the Anaheim Ducks and Los Angeles Kings played during the 2014 NHL Stadium Series at Dodger Stadium, Imber met Staples Center organist Dieter Ruehle. At the time, while Ruehle played for the Kings, the Ducks did not employ an organist.

In 2015, the Ducks acting on Ruehle's recommendation invited Imber to audition for the organist vacancy; Her first game with Anaheim was Game 1 of the 2015 Stanley Cup Playoffs's First Round series between Anaheim and the visiting Winnipeg Jets. Similar to Atlanta Braves organist Matthew Kaminski's use of organ walkup songs, Imber plays a short flourish tailored for each player upon a goal or assist announcement.

In 2020, the Loyola Marymount Lions baseball team announced Imber as organist for its Sunday Kids Days promotion.

Imber designed the Ducks' first-ever Pride themed warm-up jerseys to honor the LGBT community. Ducks players wore these jerseys during the team's inaugural Pride Night vs the Montreal Canadiens on March 3, 2023.

== Sports officiating analyst ==
A part-time referee and umpire, Imber in 2006 created Umpire Ejection Fantasy League, a website that tracks MLB umpire ejections.

In 2011, the site became known as Close Call Sports, and added to its ejection tracking feature the role of analyzing and explaining rules and controversial calls. It has attracted the attention of several current and past MLB umpires, such as Bob Davidson, who has become a site regular. CloseCallSports has produced several podcasts featuring interviews with former umpires, including Davidson, Dale Scott, Jim Joyce, and others.

In 2015, Imber published an article in the Society for American Baseball Research (SABR)'s flagship publication, The Baseball Research Journal, about MLB's inaugural season with expanded instant replay. Imber also is credited as a contributing author to The SABR Book of Umpires and Umpiring, having written a chapter entitled, "'You're Out of Here' - A History of Umpire Ejections."

In 2025, Imber was named Woman of the Year in the California State Assembly for the 44th District by Assemblymember Nick Schultz, citing her work as a sports organist, rules analyst, and service as President of the Sherman Oaks Neighborhood Council in Los Angeles.

== Personal life ==
In June 2021, Imber began hormone replacement therapy. In October 2021, on National Coming Out Day, she came out as transgender and bisexual.
