= William H. Rosenthal =

American politician

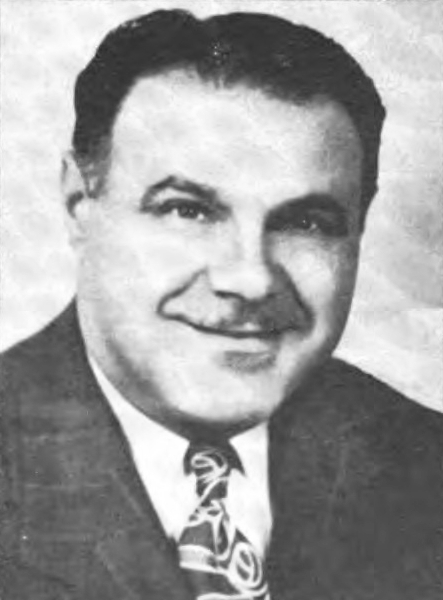
- Rosenthal c. 1950

Judge of the Los Angeles County Superior Court
- In office November 13, 1961 – March 10, 1977
- Appointed by: Pat Brown

Judge of the Los Angeles Municipal Court
- In office January 16, 1959 – November 13, 1961
- Appointed by: Pat Brown

Chairman of the California Democratic Party
- In office August 10, 1958 – January 25, 1959
- Preceded by: Roger Kent
- Succeeded by: William A. Munnell

Member of the California State Assembly from the 40th district
- In office January 4, 1943 – January 5, 1953
- Preceded by: John B. Cooke
- Succeeded by: Edward E. Elliott

Personal details
- Born: October 3, 1907 New York City, U.S.
- Died: March 15, 1991 (aged 83) Palm Springs, California, U.S.
- Party: Democratic
- Spouse(s): Diana Flaxman (m. 1932) Lilith
- Children: Elizabeth
- Relatives: Ben Rosenthal (brother)
- Education: Southwestern Law School (L.L.B.); Loyola University (L.L.D.)

William Harrison Rosenthal (October 3, 1907 – March 15, 1991) was a Jewish-American lawyer and politician who became known as the "Father of the UCLA School of Law" for his legislation establishing the school. He served in the California State Assembly for the 40th district from 1943 to 1953, as chairman of the California Democratic Party from 1958 to 1959, as a judge of the Los Angeles Municipal Court from 1959 to 1961, and as a judge of the Los Angeles County Superior Court from 1961 to 1977.

Early in his career, Rosenthal served as a deputy city attorney of Los Angeles, from 1937 to 1953. His brother was Ben Rosenthal, another State Assemblyman and city judge.

After he left the bench, Rosenthal retired to Palm Springs, where he died on March 15, 1991.
