= Senator Liu =

Senator Liu may refer to:

- Carol Liu (born 1941), California State Senate
- John Liu (born 1967), New York State Senate
