= Tom Hayden =

American activist (1939–2016)

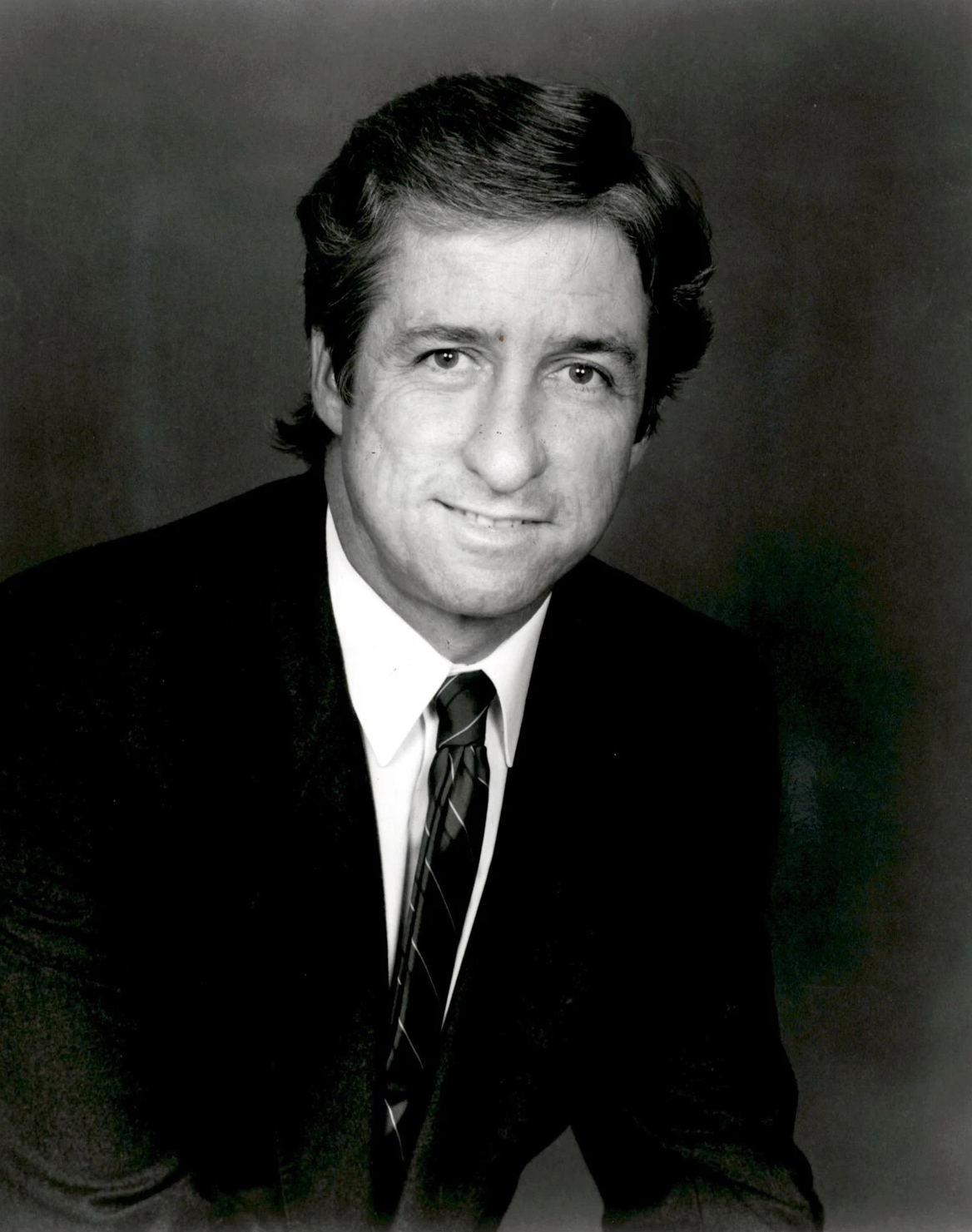
- Official portrait, 1993

Member of the California Senate from the 23rd district
- In office December 7, 1992 – November 30, 2000
- Preceded by: Herschel Rosenthal
- Succeeded by: Sheila Kuehl

Member of the California State Assembly from the 44th district
- In office December 6, 1982 – November 30, 1992
- Preceded by: Mel Levine
- Succeeded by: Bill Hoge

Personal details
- Born: Thomas Emmet Hayden; December 11, 1939 Royal Oak, Michigan, U.S.
- Died: October 23, 2016 (aged 76) Santa Monica, California, U.S.
- Party: Democratic
- Spouses: Sandra Cason (m. 1961; div. 1965) Jane Fonda (m. 1973; div. 1990) Barbara Williams (m. 1993)
- Children: 2, including Troy Garity
- Education: University of Michigan (BA)
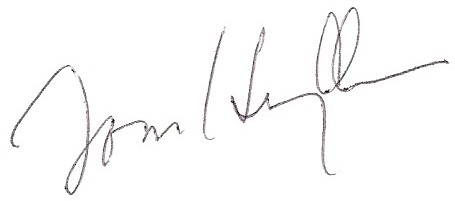
- Signature

Thomas Emmet Hayden (December 11, 1939 – October 23, 2016) was an American social and political activist, author, and politician. Hayden was best known for his role as an anti-war, civil rights, and intellectual activist in the 1960s, becoming an influential figure in the rise of the New Left. As a leader of the leftist organization Students for a Democratic Society, he wrote the Port Huron Statement, helped lead protests at the 1968 Democratic National Convention, and stood trial in the resulting "Chicago Seven" case.

In later years, he ran for political office numerous times, winning seats in both the California State Assembly and California State Senate. At the end of his life, he was the director of the Peace and Justice Resource Center in Los Angeles County. He was married to Jane Fonda for 17 years and is the father of actor Troy Garity.

== Early life and activism ==
Tom Hayden was born in Royal Oak, Michigan, to parents of Irish ancestry, Genevieve Isabelle (née Garity) and John Francis Hayden. His father was a former Marine who worked for Chrysler as an accountant and was also a violent alcoholic. When Hayden was 10, his parents divorced, and his mother raised him. Hayden attended a Catholic elementary school, where he read out loud to nuns and "learned to fear hell."

Hayden grew up attending a church led by Charles Coughlin, a Catholic priest noted for his anti-Semitic teachings, and who was also known nationally during the time of The Great Depression as the "radio priest". Hayden's dismay with Coughlin was allegedly what caused him to break with the Catholic Church as a teenager. However, a 1990 Seattle Times article described Hayden's main rebellion while growing up as being to the "tyranny of the nuns."

Hayden attended Dondero High School in Royal Oak, Michigan. He served as the editor for the school newspaper, and in his farewell column in the newspaper, he used the first letter of successive paragraphs to spell "Go to hell". As a result, when he was graduated in 1956, he was banned from attending his graduation ceremony and only received a diploma.

Hayden then attended the University of Michigan, where he was editor of the Michigan Daily. At the National Student Association convention in Minneapolis in August 1960, Hayden witnessed a dramatic intervention by Sandra Cason. To a standing ovation she turned back a motion denying support for sit-ins in the struggle against racial segregation: “I cannot say to a person who suffers injustice, ‘Wait,’ And having decided that I cannot urge caution, I must stand with him.” Alan Haber of the fledgling Students for a Democratic Society (SDS) recruited her on the spot. Stirred by her "ability to think morally [and] express herself poetically," Hayden soon followed her into the left-wing grouping. They married in October the following year.

Despite being attacked by a mob in McComb, Mississippi, while covering the Freedom Rides for the National Student News, Hayden himself became a Freedom Rider. On December 10, 1961, the Haydens participated in one of the many “freedom rides” taking place in response to the 1960 Boynton v. Virginia decision. After being arrested for his role in the Freedom Rides, Hayden began writing the SDS manifesto from jail in Albany, Georgia.

== The Port Huron vision and SDS ==
Refined and adopted at the first Students for Democratic Society (SDS) convention in June 1962, the Port Huron Statement called for a "new left" committed, in the spirit of participatory democracy, to "deliberativeness, honesty [and] reflection." The sponsoring League for Industrial Democracy (LID) took immediate issue. Although The Statement did express regret at the "perversion of the older left by Stalinism," it omitted the LID's standard denunciation of communism. Hayden was called to a meeting where, refusing any further concession, he clashed with Michael Harrington, as he later would with Irving Howe.

Tom Hayden was elected SDS president for the 1962–1963 academic year, but his wife Sandra Cason "Casey" Hayden left Ann Arbor, and left him, heeding the call to return to the Student Nonviolent Coordinating Committee (SNCC) in Atlanta. She later recalled that in contrast to the interminable debates she had witnessed in Ann Arbor, in SNCC discussions the focus was on action and women had a voice. The Haydens divorced in 1965. That year, with other SNCC women, Casey Hayden coauthored "Sex and Caste" since regarded as a founding document of second-wave feminism.

Convinced, in the words of the Statement, that students must "look outwards to the less exotic but more lasting struggles for justice," and with $5000 from United Automobile Workers, Hayden's first SDS initiative was the Economic Research and Action Project (ERAP). SDS community organizers would help draw white neighbourhoods into an "interacial movement of the poor". By the end of 1964 ERAP had ten inner-city projects engaging 125 student volunteers.

President of the United Packinghouse Workers of America Ralph Helstein arranged for Hayden to meet with Saul Alinsky. With twenty-five years experience in Chicago and across the country, Alinsky was considered the father of community organizing. To Helstein's dismay, Alinsky dismissed Hayden's venture into the field as naive and doomed to failure.

Hayden committed himself to the effort. For three years in Newark, he worked with a community union to organize poor black residents to take on slumlords, city inspectors and others. He was there to witness the 1967 Newark Riots which, in Rebellion in Newark (1967), he tried to place in a larger social and economic context. His profile in Newark attracted the attention of the FBI. “In view of the fact that Hayden is an effective speaker who appeals to intellectual groups and has also worked with and supported the Negro people in their program in Newark," agents recommended that he "be placed on the Rabble Rouser Index.”

Hayden was later to suggest that if ERAP across the country had failed to build to greater success (the promised "interracial movement of the poor") it was because of the escalating U.S. commitment in Vietnam: "Once again the government met an internal crisis by starting an external crisis."

== Anti-war activist ==
In 1965, while still committed in Newark, Hayden, along with Communist Party USA member Herbert Aptheker and Quaker peace activist Staughton Lynd, undertook a controversial visit to North Vietnam. The three toured villages and factories and met with an U.S. Air Force Major Ron Byrne, an American POW whose plane had been shot down and was being held prisoner. The result of this tour of North Vietnam, at a high point in the war, was a book titled The Other Side. Staughton Lynd later wrote that the New Left disavowed "the Anti-Communism of the previous generation", and that Lynd and Hayden had written, in Studies on the Left: "We refuse to be anti-Communist. We insist the term has lost all the specific content it once had."

In 1968, Hayden joined the National Mobilization Committee to End the War in Vietnam ("the Mobe") and played a major role in the protests outside the Democratic National Convention in Chicago, Illinois. The demonstrations were broken up by what the U.S. National Commission on the Causes and Prevention of Violence later described as a police riot. Six months after the convention, he and seven other protesters including Rennie Davis, Dave Dellinger, Abbie Hoffman, and Jerry Rubin were indicted on federal charges of conspiracy and incitement to riot as part of the "Chicago Eight", a.k.a. the "Chicago Seven" after Bobby Seale's case was separated from the others. Hayden and four others were convicted of crossing state lines to incite a riot, but the charges were later reversed and remanded on appeal. The government did not re-try the case, and thereafter elected to dismiss the substantive charges.

Hayden made several subsequent well-publicized visits to North Vietnam as well as Cambodia during America's involvement in the Vietnam War, which had expanded under President Richard M. Nixon to include the adjoining nations of Laos and Cambodia, although he did not accompany his future wife, actress Jane Fonda, on her especially controversial trip to Hanoi in the summer of 1972. The next year he married Fonda and they had one child, Troy Garity, born on July 7, 1973. In 1974, he appeared in a brief scene as an ER doctor in the film Death Wish. In the same year, while the Vietnam War was still ongoing, the documentary film Introduction to the Enemy, a collaboration by Fonda, Hayden, Haskell Wexler and others, was released. It depicts their travels through North and South Vietnam in spring 1974.

Hayden also founded the Indochina Peace Campaign (IPC), which operated from 1972 to 1975. The IPC, operating in Boston, New York, Detroit and Santa Clara, mobilized dissent against the Vietnam War and demanded unconditional amnesty for U.S. draft evaders, among other aims. Jane Fonda, a supporter of the IPC, later turned this moniker into a name for her film production firm, IPC Films, which produced in whole or in part, movies and documentaries such as F.T.A. (1972), Introduction to the Enemy (1974), The China Syndrome (1979), Nine to Five (1980) and On Golden Pond (1981). Hayden and Fonda divorced in 1990.

== New Left legacy ==
Writing about Hayden's role in the 1960s New Left, Nicholas Lemann, national correspondent for The Atlantic, said that "Tom Hayden changed America", calling him "father to the largest mass protests in American history", and Richard N. Goodwin, who was a speechwriter for presidents Lyndon B. Johnson and John F. Kennedy, said that Hayden, "without even knowing it, inspired the Great Society." Staughton Lynd, though, was critical of the Port Huron and New Left concept of "participatory democracy", stating: "We must recognize that when an organization grows to a certain size, consensus decision-making is no longer possible, and some form of representative government becomes necessary." Nevertheless, his FBI files also showed Hayden held meetings with some people who the New Left opposed, such as Rev. Billy Graham. He also was revealed to have developed a friendship with Robert F. Kennedy, and served as one of the pallbearers for Kennedy's casket during his funeral.

== California politics ==
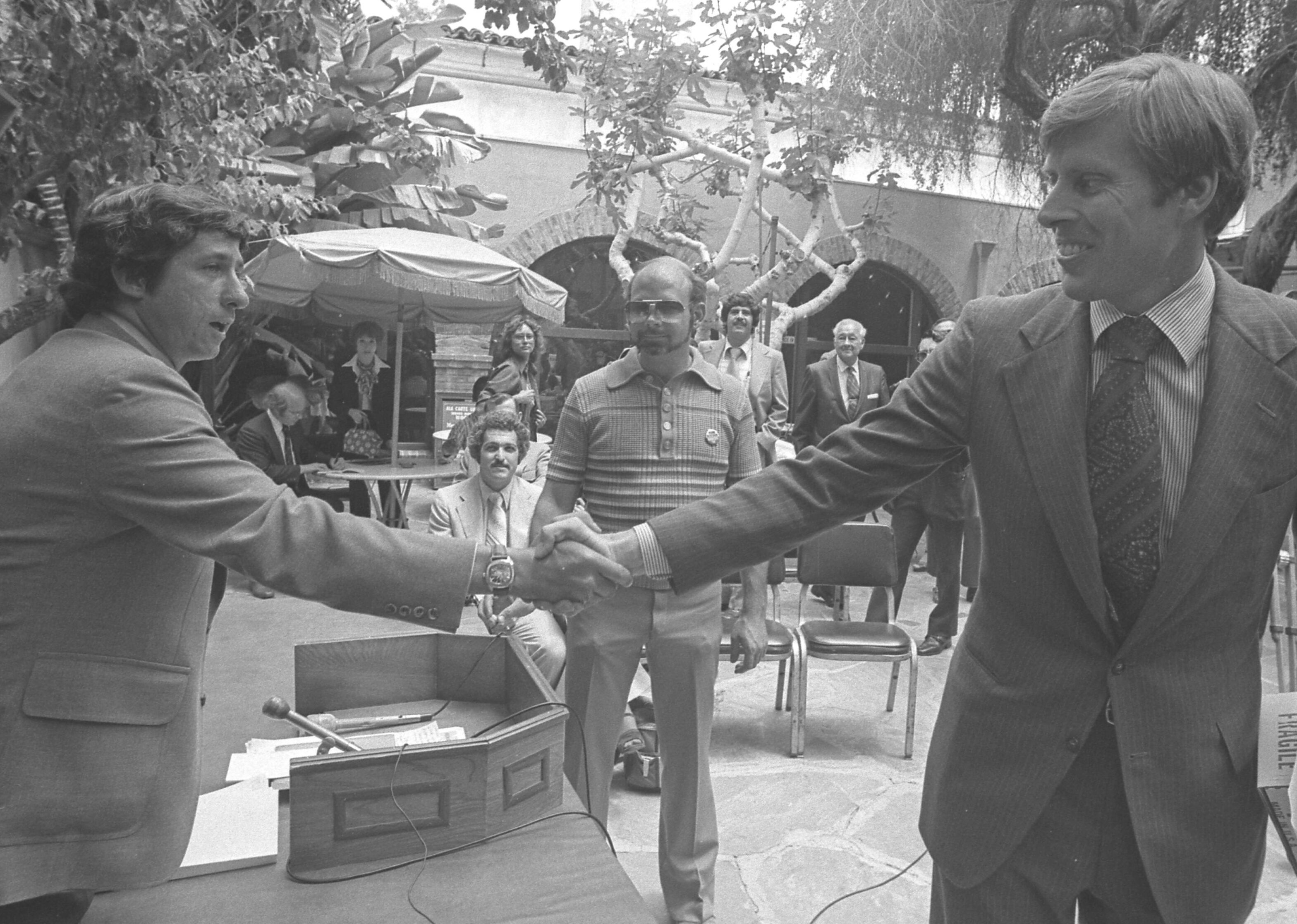
Hayden shaking hands with U.S. Senator John V. Tunney, May 28, 1976

During 1976, Hayden made a primary election challenge to California U.S. Senator John V. Tunney. "The radicalism of the 1960s is fast becoming the common sense of the 1970s", The New York Times reported him saying at the time. Starting far behind, Hayden mounted a spirited, sometimes bitter campaign. His wife Jane Fonda accused Tunney of being a "playboy dilettante who dates teenage girls.” Mentioning Tunney's friendship with Edward Kennedy, Hayden called Tunney "a Chappaquiddick waiting to happen" - a reference to the Chappaquiddick incident, which tarnished Kennedy's reputation. Hayden finished second in the primary election. That fall, Tunney was defeated in his reelection bid by Republican S. I. Hayakawa.

Also in 1976, Hayden and Jane Fonda founded the Campaign for Economic Democracy (CED), a political advocacy organization which promoted economic democracy and supported a range of progressive issues. Based in Santa Monica, CED activists mounted a successful effort to pass a rent control measure in that city in 1979.

Hayden later served in the California State Assembly (1982–1992) and the State Senate (1992–2000). During this time, he was frequently protested by conservative groups, including Vietnamese refugees, military veterans, and members of Young Americans for Freedom. He mounted a bid in the Democratic primary for California Governor during 1994 on the theme of campaign finance reform and ran for Mayor of Los Angeles in 1997, losing to incumbent Republican Richard Riordan.

As a member of the State Assembly, Hayden introduced the bill that became Chapter 1238 of the California Statutes of 1987. Chapter 1238 enacted Section 76060.5 of the California Education Code. Section 76060.5 allows the establishment of "student representation fees" at colleges in the California Community Colleges System. The fee has been established at several dozen colleges, and it may be used "to provide support for governmental affairs representatives of local or statewide student body organizations who may be stating their positions and viewpoints before city, county, and district governments, and before offices and agencies of state government". Student representation fees are used to support the operation of the Student Senate for California Community Colleges.

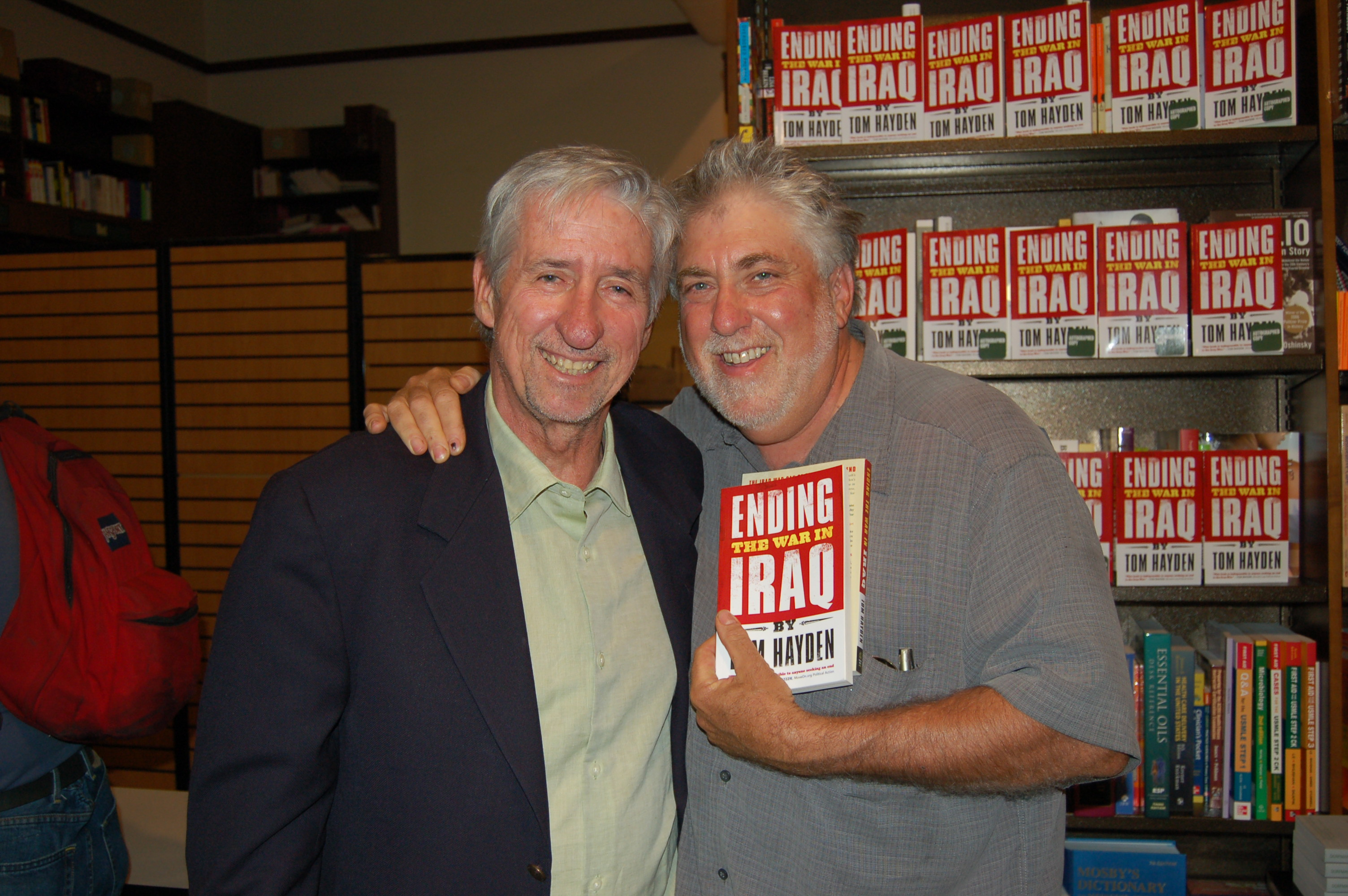
Hayden (left) with anti-war activist Mark Rudd at the Strand Bookstore in New York City, June 18, 2007

During 1999, Hayden made a speech for the Seattle WTO protests. During 2001, he unsuccessfully sought election to the Los Angeles City Council. Hayden served as a member of the advisory board for the Progressive Democrats of America, an organization created to increase progressive political cooperation and influence within the Democratic Party. He served on the advisory board of the Levantine Cultural Center, a nonprofit organization founded in Los Angeles in 2001 that champions cultural literacy about the Middle East and North Africa. During January 2008, Hayden wrote an opinion essay for The Huffington Post's website endorsing Barack Obama's presidential bid in the Democratic primaries. In that same year, he helped initiate Progressives for Obama (now called Progressive America Rising), a group of political progressives that provided assistance for Obama in his initial presidential campaign.

Hayden was known widely in California as a staunch endorser of animal rights and was responsible for writing the bill popularly known as the Hayden Act, which improved protection of pets and extended holding periods for pets confined as strays or surrendered to shelters.

In 2016, Hayden ran to be one of California's representatives to the Democratic National Committee. Though he originally leaned towards Bernie Sanders in the 2016 Democratic Presidential Primary, Hayden later announced he would support Hillary Clinton and cast his vote for her when the primary reached California. He also claimed that he never endorsed Sanders and only supported his campaign with the hope that it would push Clinton's policies leftward.

Hayden maintained that he remained radical towards the end of his life, commenting, "I'm Jefferson in terms of democracy," he said, "I'm Thoreau in terms of environment, and Crazy Horse in terms of social movements". In his last years, however, he also described himself as "an archeological dig", noting the varied layers to his life, the many publications he produced, and the different ways future researchers would likely interpret his life and work.

== Academic career ==
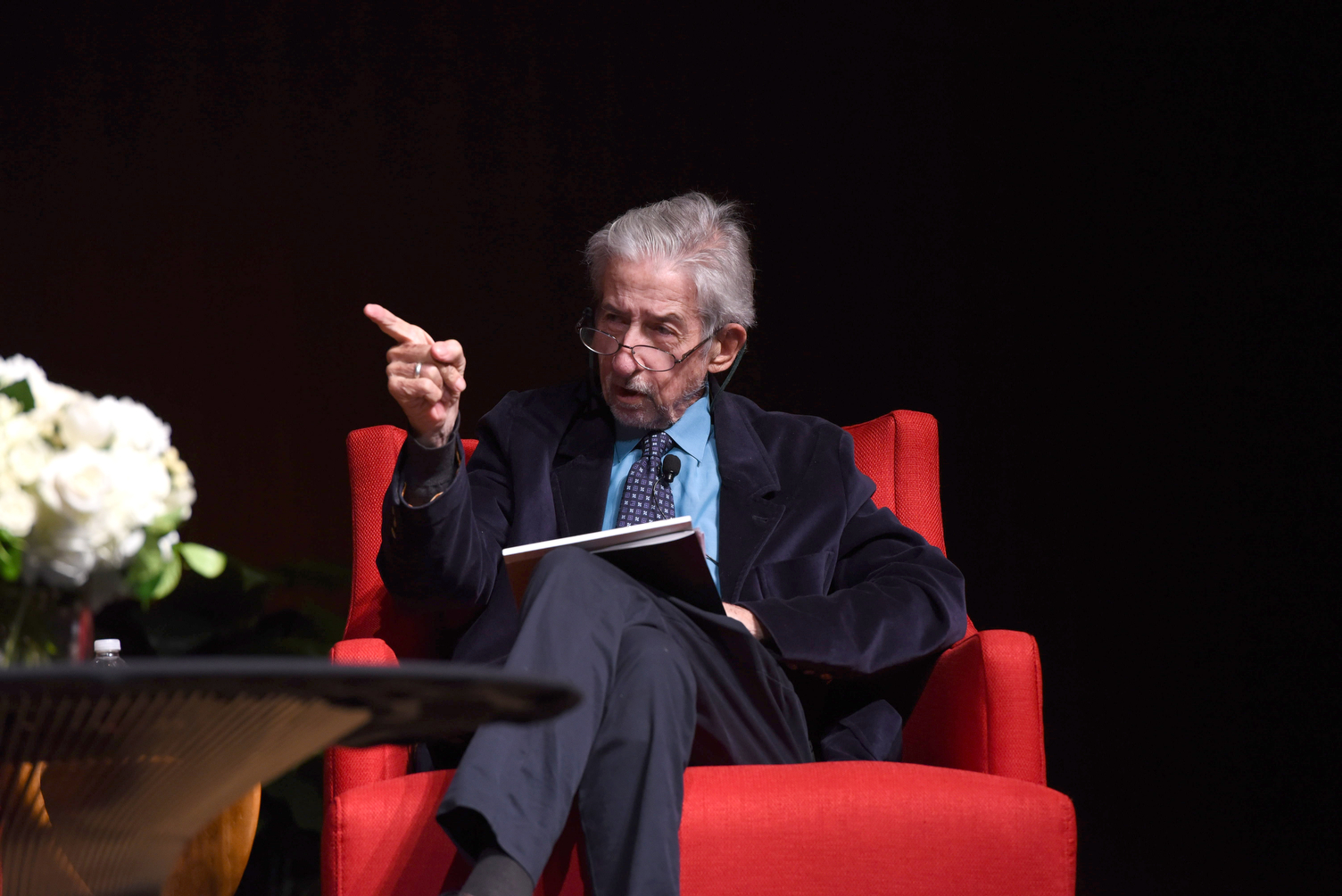
Hayden at a panel discussion on the Vietnam War held at the LBJ Presidential Library on April 27, 2016, less than six months before his death

Hayden was a teaching assistant at the University of Michigan Journalism Department in the early 1960s. The Law of the Press was one of the courses he taught. Hayden taught numerous courses on social movements, two at Scripps College—one on the Long War and one on gangs in America—and a course called "From the '60s to the Obama Generation" at Pitzer College. He also taught at Occidental College and at Harvard University's Institute of Politics. He taught a class at University of California, Los Angeles on protests from Port Huron to the present. Hayden taught a class in political science at the University of Southern California during the 1977–78 school year. He was the author or editor of 19 books, including The Long Sixties: From 1960 to Barack Obama, Writings for a Democratic Society: The Tom Hayden Reader, and his memoir, Reunion, and served on the editorial board of The Nation. His book Hell No: The Forgotten Power of the Vietnam Peace Movement, completed in the months before his death in October 2016, was published on January 31, 2017, by Yale University Press.

During 2007, Akashic Books released Hayden's Ending the War in Iraq. In a discussion about the book with Theodore Hamm published in the Brooklyn Rail, Hayden argues, "The apparatus of occupation is never going to turn into a peacekeeping economic development agency. We need to withdraw our stamp of approval and our tax dollars from supporting the occupation. That doesn't mean that there can't be some attempts at remedies, but these should never be used as an excuse to stay."

== Personal life ==
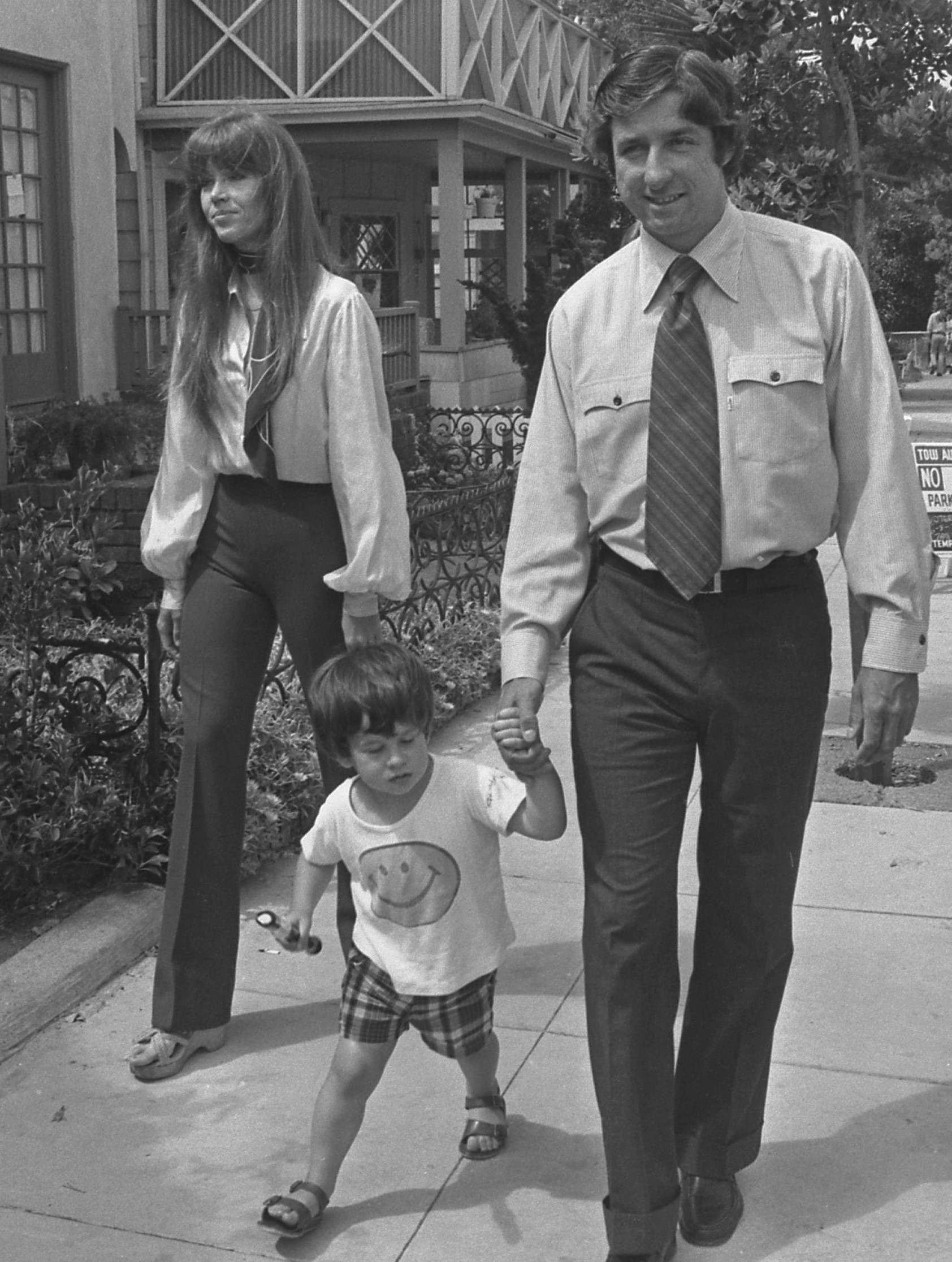
Hayden with his wife Jane Fonda and son Troy Garity, June 9, 1976

He was married to actress and social activist Jane Fonda for 17 years, and was the father of actor Troy Garity. Hayden lived in Los Angeles beginning in 1971 and was married to his third wife, Barbara Williams, at the time of his death. He and Williams adopted a son.

Hayden died at a hospital in Santa Monica, California, on October 23, 2016, aged 76. Williams told The New York Times that Hayden had a history of heart problems and his health had declined in the preceding months. He is buried in Woodlawn Cemetery in Santa Monica, where he is the first interment in "Eternal Meadow," an eco-friendly section. Former U.S. President Bill Clinton memorialized him, saying, "Hillary and I knew him for more than thirty years and valued both his words of support and his criticism."

== Popular culture ==
- Brian Benben portrayed Hayden in the 1987 film Conspiracy: The Trial of the Chicago 8.
- Troy Garity, Hayden's son, portrayed his father in the 2000 film Steal This Movie!.
- Hayden was voiced by Reg Rogers in the 2007 animated documentary Chicago 10.
- David Julian Hirsh played Hayden in the 2010 film The Chicago 8.
- Hayden was portrayed by Eddie Redmayne in the 2020 drama film The Trial of the Chicago 7.

== Works ==
- The Port Huron Statement (1962)
- The Other Side (1966)
- "The Politics of 'The Movement'", in Irving Howe (ed.), The Radical Papers. Garden City, NY: Doubleday and Co., 1966; pp. 350–364.
- Rebellion in Newark: Official Violence and Ghetto Response (1967)
- Trial (1970)
- The Love of Possession Is a Disease with Them (1972)
- Vietnam: The Struggle for Peace, 1972–73 (1973)
- The American Future: New Visions Beyond Old Frontiers (1980)
- Reunion: A Memoir (1988)
- The Lost Gospel of the Earth: A Call for Renewing Nature, Spirit and Politics (1996)
- Irish Hunger (1997)
- Irish on the Inside: In Search of the Soul of Irish America (2001)
- The Zapatista Reader (Introduction, 2001)
- Rebel: A Personal History of the 1960s (2003)
- Street Wars: Gangs and the Future of Violence (2004)
- Radical Nomad: C. Wright Mills and His Times with Contemporary Reflections by Stanley Aronowitz, Richard Flacks and Charles Lemert (2006)
- Ending the War in Iraq (2007)
- Writings for a Democratic Society: The Tom Hayden Reader (2008)
- Voices of the Chicago 8: A Generation on Trial (2008)
- The Long Sixties: From 1960 to Barack Obama (2009)
- Bring on the Iraq Syndrome: Tom Hayden in Conversation with Theodore Hamm (2007)
- Listen, Yankee!: Why Cuba Matters (2015)
- Hell No: The Forgotten Power of the Vietnam Peace Movement (2017)

== See also ==
- List of peace activists

California Assembly
Preceded by Mel Levine	Member of the California Assembly from the 44th district 1982–1992	Succeeded by Bill Hoge
California Senate
Preceded by Herschel Rosenthal	Member of the California Senate from the 23rd district 1992–2000	Succeeded by Sheila Kuehl
