= Hayden Act =

1998 California State Legislature act

California State Legislature
- Full name: An act to amend Sections 1815, 1816, 1834, 1845, 1846, 1847, and 2080 of, and to add Section 1834.4 to, the Civil Code, to amend Sections 31108, 31752, and 32001 of, to add Sections 17005, 17006, 31752.5, 31753, and 32003 to, and to add, repeal, and add Section 31754 of, the Food and Agricultural Code, and to amend Section 597.1 of, and to add Section 599d to, the Penal Code, relating to stray animals.
- Introduced: February 18, 1998
- Assembly voted: August 26, 1998 (72-3)
- Senate voted: August 30, 1998 (22-9)
- Signed into law: September 22, 1998
- Sponsor(s): Tom Hayden
- Governor: Pete Wilson
- Bill: SB 1785
- Website: https://www.leginfo.ca.gov/pub/97-98/bill/sen/sb_1751-1800/sb_1785_bill_19980923_chaptered.html

Status: Partly in force (Some parts of the Act were suspended due to financial concerns.)

The Hayden Act, introduced by California Senator Tom Hayden as Senate Bill 1785 on February 18, 1998, amended California Law as it applies to companion animals.

Under the then-existing law, dogs or cats impounded by public pounds or shelters could be killed after 72 hours of being impounded. The Hayden Act, signed into law on September 22, 1998 and effective July 1, 1999, expanded this minimum impound time to 4 or 6 business days, as specified, and required that the animal be released to a nonprofit animal rescue or adoption organization in certain circumstances, subject to specified exceptions.

== Authorship and ratification ==
Along with Hayden, law professor in animal law and nonprofit law Taimie Bryant of UCLA School of Law is also credited with writing the majority of the laws. The bill became law after then Governor Pete Wilson signed it on September 22, 1998.

== Lawsuits ==
=== Lock v. Kern County, California ===
In 2004, the first lawsuit filed under the Hayden Act, Petitioner Patricia Lock, represented by California attorney, and Animal Rights and Hayden Act expert, Kate Neiswender, sought an injunction prohibiting Kern County, California from violating the act by euthanizing companion animals prior to the expiration of the holding period and engaging in other prohibited conduct. The court found Kern County Animal Control to be in violation of the Hayden Act and required the shelters to adopt and follow acceptable guidelines such as working with rescue groups to assure more animals will leave the shelter alive, basic cleaning and animal care husbandry be followed.

=== Johnson v. Kings County, California ===
In 2007, a second lawsuit was filed under the Hayden Act by Petitioner Kara Johnson, represented by California attorney, Kate Neiswender. The case began with a shelter audit that found that the county-run animal control was not keeping accurate records, scanning for microchips, providing veterinary care to animals, nor following the minimum hold time of the Hayden Act. The lawsuit later resolved to the satisfaction of all parties.

=== Jacie Conaway v. San Bernardino County, California ===
In 2007, Petitioner Jacie Conaway, represented by California attorney, and Animal Rights and Hayden Act expert, Okorie Okorocha, filed a similar action against San Bernardino County, California. The lawsuit later resolved to the satisfaction of all parties.They withdrew the lawsuit after they reviewed the county's response. Resolution was obtained by the petitioner withdrawing the complaint and litigation filed against the County.

=== Rich Mc Lellan, M.D. v. Mendocino County, California ===
In 2007, Rich Mc Lellan, M.D., the President of the California Chapter of the League of Humane Voters, represented by California attorney, and Animal Rights and Hayden Act expert, Okorie Okorocha filed an action against Mendocino County, California titled Mc Lellan v. County of Mendocino to have a statute enacted by the County, known as "Sec. 10.24.010 Voluntary Surrender of Animal for Euthanasia: Not Impoundment" which contradicted the Hayden Act, and allowed for the unlawful euthanization of companion animals, declared invalid by the Mendocino County, California Court. The Mendocino County, California County Council repealed the statute before the case went to trial:

BOARD OF SUPERVISORS – SUMMARY/ACTION MINUTES – JUNE 19, 2007 PAGE 454 AGENDA ITEM NO. 10A – INTRODUCTION AND WAIVE THE READING OF AN ORDINANCE REPEALING MENDOCINO COUNTY CODE SECTION 10.24.010 IN ITS ENTIRETY – COUNTY COUNSEL Presenter/s: Ms. Jeanine B. Nadel, County Counsel, introduced that matter, noting that this ordinance section directly contradicts State law (Food and Agricultural Code Sections), recommending it be repealed in its entirety. Board Action: Upon motion by Supervisor Delbar, seconded by Supervisor Colfax, and carried (4, with Supervisor Wattenburger absent); IT IS ORDERED that the Board of Supervisors introduces and waives the reading of the ordinance repealing Mendocino County Code Section 10.24.010 in its entirety
