= Jack Scott (California politician) =

American politician

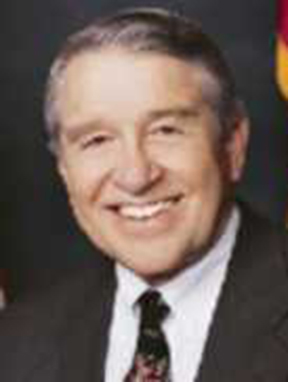
- Official portrait, 2006

Member of the California Senate from the 21st district
- In office December 4, 2000 – November 30, 2008
- Preceded by: Adam Schiff
- Succeeded by: Carol Liu

Member of the California State Assembly from the 44th district
- In office December 2, 1996 - November 30, 2000
- Preceded by: Bill Hoge
- Succeeded by: Carol Liu

9th President of Pasadena City College
- In office 1987–1995
- Preceded by: John W. Casey
- Succeeded by: James Kossler

Personal details
- Born: Jack Alan Scott; August 24, 1933 (age 93) Sweetwater, Texas, U.S.
- Party: Democratic
- Spouse: Lacreta Isbell
- Children: 5
- Education: Abilene Christian University, Yale Divinity School, Claremont Graduate University
- Profession: Politician, Teacher

Jack Alan Scott (born August 24, 1933) is an American educator and former Democratic politician. Currently, a scholar in residence at Claremont Graduate University, Scott earlier served as president at two California community colleges, member of the California State Assembly and California State Senate and Chancellor of the California Community Colleges System.

== Early life ==
Scott was born in Sweetwater, Texas. He received a Bachelor's degree from Abilene Christian University, a Master of Divinity degree from Yale Divinity School, and a Ph.D. degree in American history from Claremont Graduate University. Scott joined the faculty at Pepperdine University, after moving to California in 1962.

== Education career ==
In 1973 Scott became Dean of Instruction at Orange Coast College. Five years later he became president of Cypress College, serving from 1978 to 1987. Scott became president of Pasadena City College in 1987 and served there until 1995. He is the first President Emeritus of that school.

On May 8, 2008, Scott was selected to be the 14th Chancellor of the California Community Colleges System, the largest system of higher education in the world. Serving over two million students on 112 college campuses, the statewide system is divided into 72 community college districts, overseen by locally elected Boards of Trustees. Retiring from that position in late summer 2012, Scott became a scholar in residence at Claremont University on September 17, 2012.

== State Legislature ==
In 1996 Scott was recruited by state Democrats to run for California State Assembly against vulnerable incumbent Bill Hoge (R-Pasadena). He wound up ousting him, and then won an easy reelection in 1998.

In 2000 he ran for the California State Senate seat vacated by Democrat Adam Schiff. He faced off against fellow assemblyman Scott Wildman from neighboring Glendale in the Democratic primary. Considered more of a gadfly and complainer, Wildman was not supposed to be much of a match for the savvier Scott. He nevertheless made the race close, scoring 46.7% of the vote to Scott's 53.3%. Scott then had little trouble winning the general election and didn't even have a major party opponent in 2004.

While serving in the state Senate, Scott chaired the Senate Committee on Education and also chaired the Senate Budget Subcommittee on Education. He introduced legislation that would ban Mylar balloons in response to the Burbank Water & Power complaining about hundreds of power outages caused by these kinds of balloons. This had led to protests, led by KFI hosts John and Ken. The Senate eventually passed an amended version of the bill that would raise the penalty for selling a balloon without a proper weight attached and require the balloon to have a warning about the risks of the balloon coming in contact with power lines.

California State Term Limits prevented Scott from seeking reelection in 2008.

== Electoral history ==
Member, California State Assembly: 1996-2000Member, California State Senate: 2000-2008
Year	Office	Democrat	Votes	Pct	Republican	Votes	Pct
1996	California State Assembly; District 44	Jack Scott	72,591	53%	Bill Hoge	60,124	43.9%
1998	California State Assembly; District 72	Jack Scott	65,652	56.5%	Ken La Corte	46,652	40.1%
2000	California State Senate; District 21	Jack Scott 53.3% Scott Wildman 46.7%	158,145	58.9%	Paul Zee	100,901	37.6%
2004	California State Senate; District 21	Jack Scott	217,515	78.1%	Bob New	61,160	21.9%

Political offices
Preceded by Bill Hoge	California State Assembly, 44th District; December 2, 1996 - November 30, 2000	Succeeded by Carol Liu
Political offices
Preceded by Adam Schiff	California State Senate, 25th District; December 4, 2000 - November 30, 2008	Succeeded by Carol Liu

== Personal ==
Scott and his late wife, Lacreta (1934-2021), have five children, eleven grandchildren and fourteen great grandchildren.

== Gun control ==
Scott is very active in gun control. He began his gun control efforts after his son Adam, an attorney who had recently graduated from USC Law School, was fatally shot at a party with friends. One of his friends had a shotgun, which he did not know was loaded. His friend discharged the shotgun, hitting Adam and killing him.
