= Clare Woolwine =

American politician

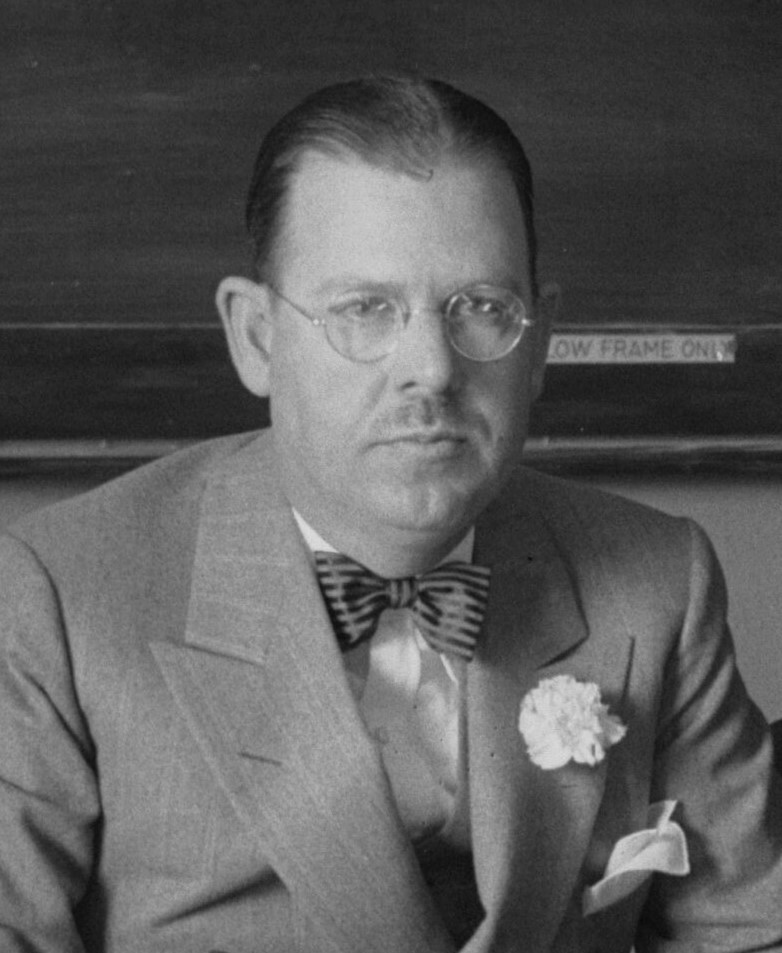
- Woolwine in 1929

Member of the California State Assembly
- In office January 3, 1927 – January 5, 1931
- Preceded by: Sidney Graves
- Succeeded by: Emory J. Arnold
- Constituency: 63rd district
- In office January 2, 1933 – January 7, 1935
- Preceded by: Maurice S. Meeker
- Succeeded by: John B. Pelletier
- Constituency: 44th district

Personal details
- Born: September 1, 1888 Nashville, Tennessee
- Died: October 4, 1939 (aged 51) Los Angeles, California
- Party: Republican

Military service
- Branch/service: United States Army
- Battles/wars: World War I

Clare Wharton Woolwine (September 1, 1888 – October 4, 1939) was an American politician who served in the California legislature representing the 63rd Assembly District from 1927 to 1931 and the 44th district from 1933 to 1935. During World War I he served in the United States Army.
