= Nick Schultz (politician) =

American politician

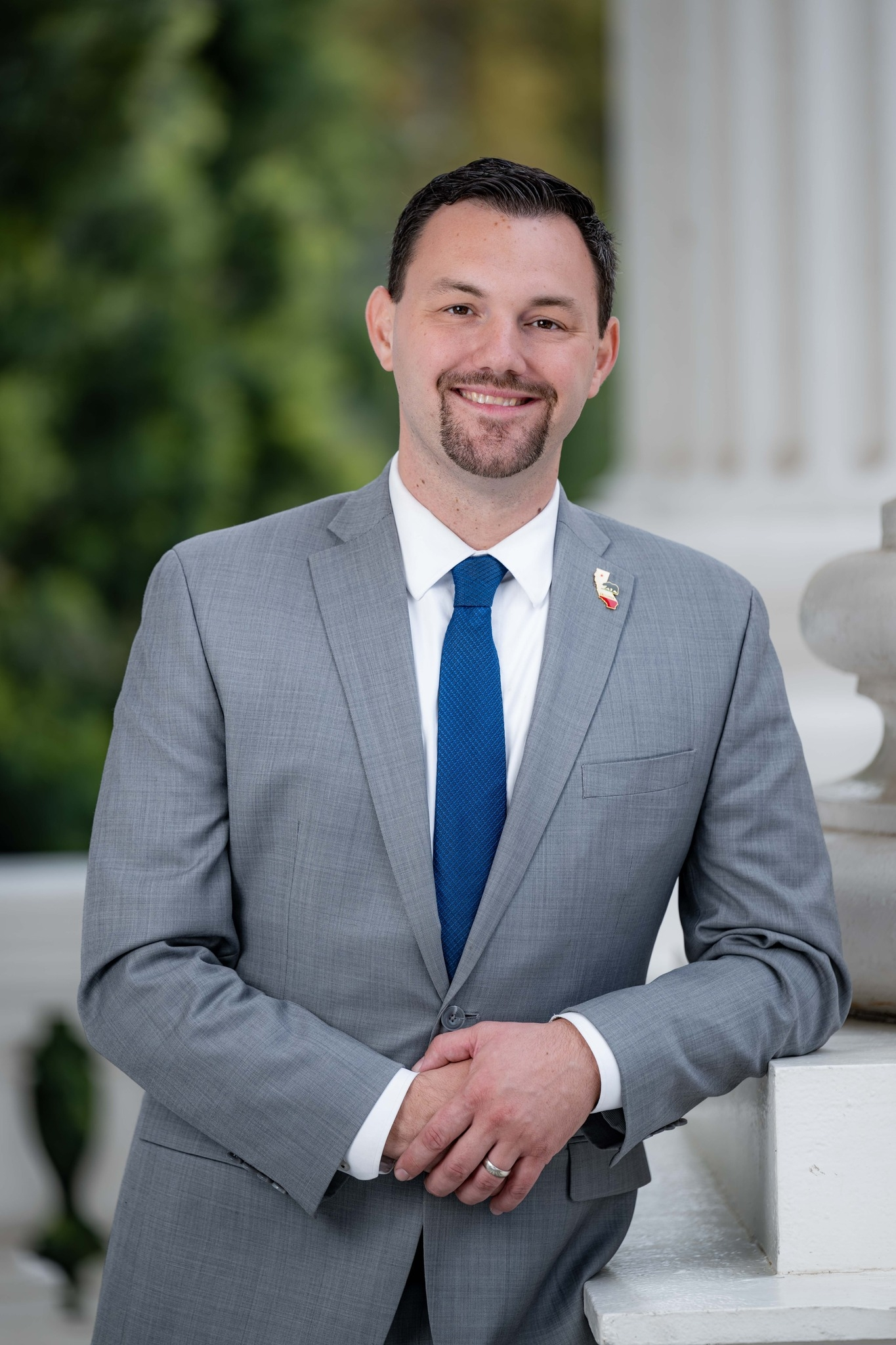
- Official portrait, 2024

Member of the California State Assembly from the 44th district
- Incumbent
- Assumed office December 2, 2024
- Preceded by: Laura Friedman

Mayor of Burbank
- In office December 18, 2023 – November 25, 2024
- Preceded by: Konstantine Anthony

Vice Mayor of Burbank
- In office December 20, 2022 – December 18, 2023
- Preceded by: Konstantine Anthony

Member of the Burbank City Council
- In office December 7, 2020 – November 25, 2024
- Preceded by: Emily Gabel-Luddy
- Succeeded by: Christopher Rizzotti

Personal details
- Born: Nicholas Bernard Coolon Schultz; August 27, 1988 (age 37)
- Party: Democratic
- Spouse: Allie Schultz
- Children: 2
- Education: University of Oregon (B.A.); University of Oregon School of Law (J.D.)

Nicholas Bernard Coolon Schultz (born August 27, 1988), is an American politician and prosecutor who has served as a member of the California State Assembly since 2024. He was previously a member of the Burbank City Council, serving as Vice Mayor from 2022 to 2023 and as Mayor from 2023 until 2024.

== Early life and career ==
Schultz was born on August 27, 1988, and raised by a single mother. He graduated from the University of Oregon with a bachelor's and earned a juris doctor from the University of Oregon School of Law. He became active in Burbank and Los Angeles County Democratic clubs prior to running for Burbank City Council.

In 2013, Schultz was admitted to the State Bar of Oregon as an attorney and worked as a deputy district attorney in Lane County, Oregon. In 2014, Schultz was admitted to the State Bar of California as an attorney.

In 2016, Schultz began working as a Deputy Attorney General in the Health Quality Enforcement (HQE) Section of the office of the attorney general of California. As part of the HQE Section, he worked to ensure that patients received high quality health care in the State of California.

In 2018, Schultz transferred to the Special Prosecutions Section of the Attorney General's Office with the California Department of Justice, where he worked with local, state, and federal law enforcement officials to investigate and prosecute criminal cases primarily related to public corruption, officer involved shootings, human trafficking, mortgage fraud, tax evasion, and other forms of financial fraud.

== Political career ==
In 2018, Schultz was elected to represent District D on the Los Feliz Neighborhood Council (LFNC) Governing Board. Also in 2018, Los Angeles Mayor Eric Garcetti appointed Schultz to Los Angeles' Central Area Planning Commission, and Schultz served in this role until 2020.

=== City of Burbank ===
In 2020, Schultz ran for the Burbank City Council in his first run for office. He placed second behind Konstantine Anthony, being elected to the City Council. In December 2023, Schultz was elected as Mayor of Burbank by the Burbank City Council, succeeding Konstantine Anthony.

During his tenure, Schultz reopened Burbank's local economy after the COVID-19 pandemic, spearheaded the city's landmark greenhouse gas reduction plan, created record-levels of housing especially for low-income families, and reduced homelessness - all while maintaining public safety and reducing violent crime.

=== California State Assembly ===
In 2024, Schultz announced his candidacy for the 2024 California State Assembly election in order to succeed Laura Friedman. Schultz finished first in a primary field of eight candidates, advancing to the general election against Republican Tony Rodriguez. Schultz won the general election earning 143,625 votes and securing approximately 65.9% of the vote on November 5, 2024.

Schultz's priorities include support for the American film industry, which has a large presence in California's 44th State Assembly district. He has commented that "[i]f production leaves Los Angeles, it hurts the state as well. We have to educate everyone that this industry is important for all of the state[.]"

On December 27, 2024, California State Assembly Speaker Robert Rivas appointed Schultz to serve as Chair of the Assembly's Committee on Public Safety. Schultz was also appointed by Speaker Rivas to serve as a member of the following Assembly standing committees: Budget, Natural Resources, and Utilities & Energy.

On March 11, 2025, Schultz named musician Lindsay Imber, a transgender woman, as 2025 Woman of the Year for Assembly District 44.

== Electoral history ==
2020 Burbank City Council election
Candidate	Votes	%
Konstantine Anthony	17,529	20.4
Nick Schultz	13,105	15.3
Tamala Takahashi	12,686	14.8
Paul Herman	11,969	13.9
Tim Murphy	10,245	11.9
Sharis Manokian	7,450	8.7
Linda Bessin	7,362	8.6
Michael Lee Gogin	5,492	6.4
Total votes	85,838	100.0

2024 California State Assembly 44th district election
Primary election
Party	Candidate	Votes	%
Democratic	Nick Schultz	31,121	28.3
Republican	Tony Rodriguez	28,280	25.7
Democratic	Ed Han	17,589	16.0
Democratic	Elen Asatryan	14,692	13.3
Democratic	Steve Pierson	8,508	7.7
Democratic	Carmenita Helligar	6,178	5.6
No party preference	Adam Summer	2,224	2.0
Democratic	Adam Pryor	1,566	1.4
Total votes		110,158	100.0
General election
Democratic	Nick Schultz	143,625	65.9
Republican	Tony Rodriguez	74,316	34.1
Total votes		217,941	100.0
Democratic hold			
