= Ang Mealaktei =

Cambodian judge

Ang Mealaktei is the former director of the Phnom Penh Municipal Court. He was sacked after only one year in the job following accusations about corruption at the court and subsequently imprisoned. He was replaced by Taing Sunlay.
