= Indochina Peace Campaign =

- Abbreviation: IPC
- Formation: 1972
- Founder: Tom Hayden; Jane Fonda
- Purpose: Opposition to United States involvement in the Vietnam War

The Indochina Peace campaign (IPC) was an antiwar organization founded in 1972 by Tom Hayden and Jane Fonda primarily to advocate for Congressional action to end American involvement in the Vietnam War and, following the March 1973 withdrawal of U.S. ground troops, to end funding for the South Vietnam military.

The campaign began in the fall of 1972 with an educational speaking tour by Hayden and Fonda in midwestern states in order to support the election of George McGovern, the antiwar Democratic candidate running against incumbent Richard Nixon in the 1972 presidential election. Following Nixon's reelection, the IPC launched a grassroots campaigns to pressure Nixon to sign and honor the Paris Peace Accords and to block funding for U.S. military activity in all of Indochina.

In September 1973, Fonda, Hayden, singer and activist Holly Near, former POW Robert P. Chenoweth, and Jean-Pierre Debris, a French primary school teacher who had been imprisoned for two years in Saigon, embarked on a 20-city tour to draw attention to the existence of an estimated 200,000 political prisoners being held in South Vietnam. The tour coincided with demonstrations in cities in the United States and around the world during International Days of Concern with Saigon's Political Prisoners, September 16-23, 1973.

The Indochina Peace Campaign organized a strategy conference from October 26-28, 1973, in Germantown, Ohio that brought together twenty peace organizations to collaborate on lobbying Congress. The coalition of peace groups was called the United Campaign to End the War and crafted the Indochina Peace Resolution, which called on the U.S. to end all military involvement, to uphold the terms of the Paris peace treaty, and to end U.S. monetary support of South Vietnamese police and political prisons. Millions of antiwar supporters contacted their representatives in support.

California Congressman Ronald Dellums introduced the substance of the Indochina Peace Resolution in a bill in the House, H.R.12156, in January 1974. In April and May 1974 the House and Senate declined to authorize a Nixon administration request for an additional $474 million in military aid for South Vietnam, in what the Washington Post called "a stunning defeat for the Nixon administration."
