= Mel Vogel =

American politician

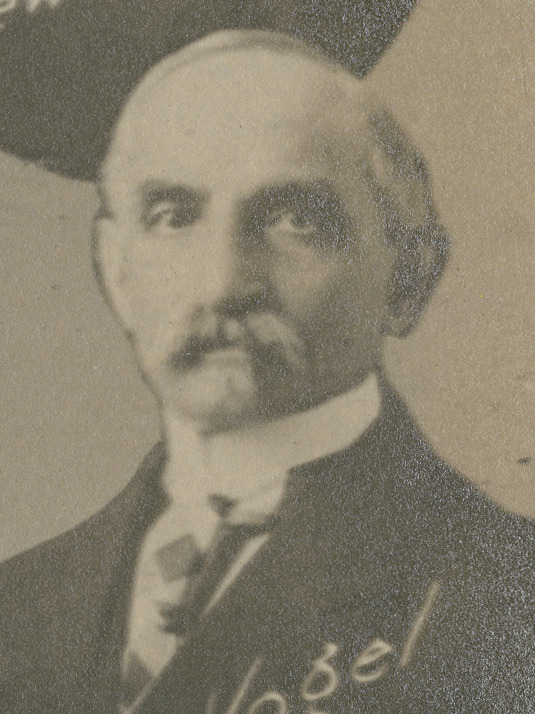
- Vogel c. 1907

Member of the California State Assembly from the 44th district
- In office January 2, 1905 - January 4, 1909
- Preceded by: James Durham Hart
- Succeeded by: George Mairs Perine

Personal details
- Born: December 15, 1848 Grand Duchy of Baden, Germany
- Died: Unknown
- Party: Republican
- Other political affiliations: Union Labor; Democratic

Mel Vogel (born 15 December 1848) was a German-American merchant, newspaperman and politician who served in the California State Assembly for the 44th district from 1905 to 1909. He was elected as a Republican but belonged to a faction of the party that supported boss Abe Ruef of the Union Labor Party, caucusing with both parties and the Democrats in the Assembly.
