= William Hoge (California politician) =

American politician (1946–2025)

Member of the California State Assembly from the 44th district
- In office December 7, 1992 - November 30, 1996
- Preceded by: Tom Hayden
- Succeeded by: Jack Scott

Personal details
- Born: April 2, 1946 Pasadena, California, U.S.
- Died: July 5, 2025 (aged 79)
- Party: Republican (former); Independent American (later)
- Spouse: Claudette (m. 1972)
- Children: 3

Military service
- Branch/service: United States Coast Guard

William Edison Hoge (April 2, 1946 – July 5, 2025) was an American politician from California and a onetime member of the Republican Party.

== Life and career ==
After the 1991 redistricting the Pasadena, Altadena and Sunland-Tujunga areas gained their own GOP-leaning seat in the California State Assembly. Businessman Bill Hoge, backed by a host of conservatives, won a 10-way GOP primary and then defeated a weak Democrat to take this seat.

Democrats, meanwhile, considered Hoge vulnerable. They noted that despite the weakness of their nominee in 1992, Hoge still performed poorly. They recruited former Pasadena police chief Bruce Philpott to run against Hoge in 1994, but he was unsuccessful.

In 1996, GOP state senate minority leader Rob Hurtt of Garden Grove tried to persuade Hoge to run for an open state senate seat. Hoge declined, thinking it was a safer bet to stay in the assembly. That year he gained national notoriety for sponsoring the first bill in the United States to mandate chemical castration as a condition of parole for recidivist sex offenders. The measure passed and was approved by Governor Pete Wilson. As of 2026 the measure remains law in California. Despite the bill's draconian phrasing, a spokesperson for the California Department of Corrections in 2010 was quoted by CBS San Diego as having "no information showing the program is actually being implemented on a widespread basis."

Hoge was defeated for reelection by Democrat Jack Scott, former president of Pasadena City College.

Hoge later moved to Nevada and joined the Independent American Party of Nevada, which he ran under for Nevada State Treasurer in 2018, the Nevada Assembly in 2020, Lieutenant Governor of Nevada in 2022, and Nevada's 1st congressional district in 2024. He died on July 5, 2025, at the age of 79.

== Electoral history ==
Member, California State Assembly: 1986–1988
Year	Office	Democrat	Votes	Pct	Republican	Votes	Pct
1992	California State Assembly; District 44	Johnathan Fuhrman	65,332	44%	Bill Hoge	77,044	51.8%
1994	California State Assembly; District 44	Bruce Philpott	37,112	41.8%	Bill Hoge	64,276	53.3%
1996	California State Assembly; District 44	Jack Scott	72,591	53%	Bill Hoge	60,124	43.9%

Political offices
Preceded by Tom Hayden	California State Assembly 44th District; December 7, 1992 – November 30, 1996	Succeeded by Jack Scott
