= John B. Pelletier =

American politician

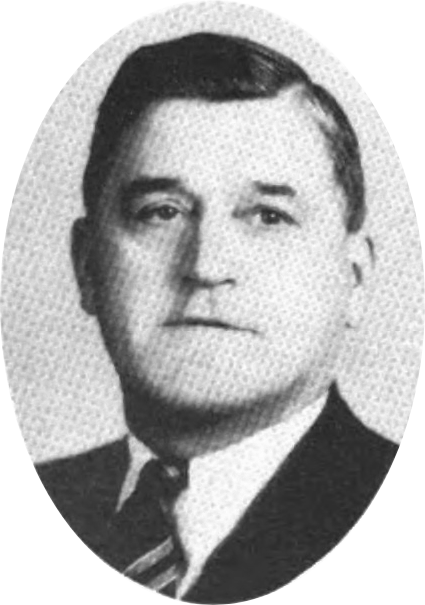
- Pelletier c. 1942

Member of the California State Assembly from the 44th district
- In office January 7, 1935 - November 29, 1946
- Preceded by: Clare Woolwine
- Succeeded by: Edward E. Elliott

Personal details
- Born: September 22, 1884 Quebec, Canada
- Died: November 29, 1946 (aged 62) Los Angeles, California, U.S.
- Party: Democratic
- Education: Ricker Classical Institute; Bates College; Boston University School of Law; Institute for Religious Science and Philosophy

John Baptiste Pelletier (born September 22, 1884 - November 29, 1946) was a Canadian-born American politician who served in the California State Assembly for the 44th district from 1935 to 1946. He immigrated to the United States in 1895.

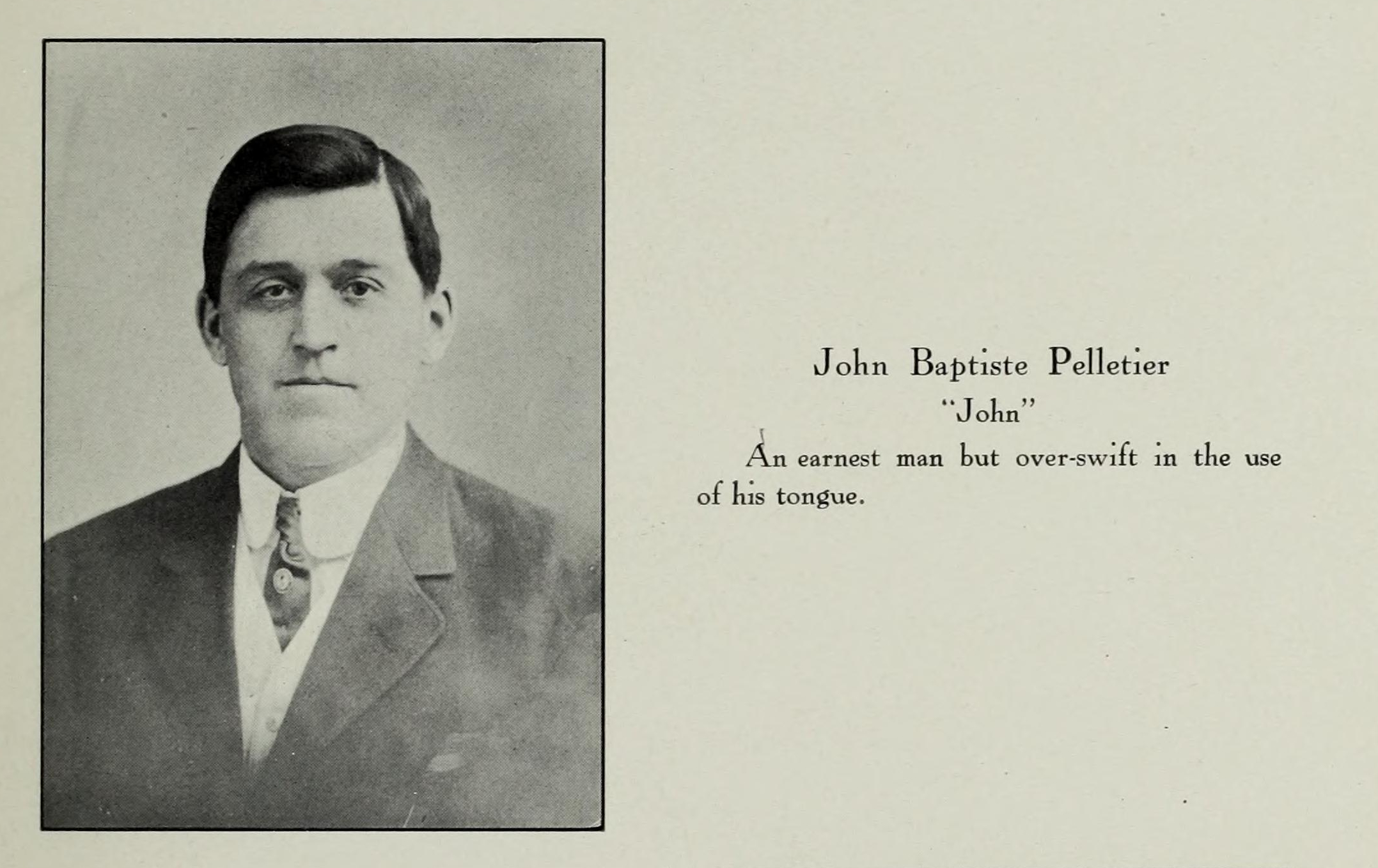
Pelletier in the Bates College yearbook, 1911

Pelletier is notable for the fact that, in 1934, he was a "bum" on Skid Row in Los Angeles when master lobbyist Arthur Samish cleaned him up and successfully ran him for the State Assembly. He was one of two dozen "EPIC Democrats" elected to the state legislature in 1934.
