= Edward E. Elliott =

American politician

Member of the California State Assembly from the 40th district
- In office January 5, 1953 – January 6, 1969
- Preceded by: William H. Rosenthal
- Succeeded by: Alex P. Garcia

Member of the California State Assembly from the 44th district
- In office April 10, 1947 - January 5, 1953
- Preceded by: John B. Pelletier
- Succeeded by: Herbert R. Klocksiem

Personal details
- Born: April 2, 1911 Oregon, US
- Died: January 30, 1993 (aged 81) Covina, California, US
- Party: Democratic
- Spouse: Carol Milman

Military service
- Branch/service: United States Army
- Battles/wars: World War II

Edward Emerson Elliott (April 2, 1911 – January 30, 1993) served in the California State Assembly for the 44th and 40th district from 1947 to 1969. During World War II he served in the United States Army.
