= Carol Liu =

American politician (born 1941)

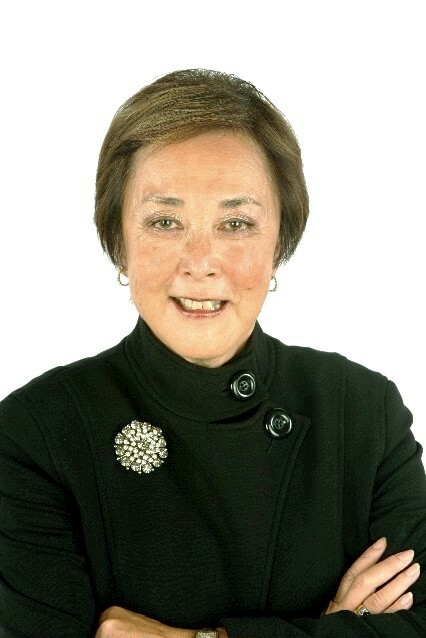

Member of the California State Senate
- In office December 1, 2008 – November 30, 2016
- Preceded by: Jack Scott
- Succeeded by: Anthony Portantino
- Constituency: 21st district (2008–2012); 25th district (2012–2016)

Member of the California State Assembly from the 44th district
- In office December 4, 2000 – November 30, 2006
- Preceded by: Jack Scott
- Succeeded by: Anthony J. Portantino

Personal details
- Born: Carol Jean Liu; September 12, 1941 (age 85) Berkeley, California
- Party: Democratic
- Spouse: Michael Peevey
- Children: 3
- Education: San Jose State University (BA); University of California, Berkeley (certificate)
- Profession: Teacher

Chinese name
- Traditional Chinese: 劉璿卿
- Simplified Chinese: 刘璇卿
Transcriptions
Standard Mandarin
- Hanyu Pinyin: Liú Xuánqīng

Carol Jean Liu (born September 12, 1941) is an American politician who is a former member of the California State Senate. A Democrat, she represented Senate District 25, which includes portions of the San Fernando and San Gabriel Valleys.

Before being elected to the State Senate, Liu served in the State Assembly representing the 44th Assembly District until 2006. In 2008, Liu was elected to succeed the termed-out Jack Scott in the State Senate.

== Early life and career ==
Liu was born in 1941 in Berkeley, California. Her mother was a fourth generation Californian, and her father was a Chinese immigrant. Liu graduated from San Jose State College with a B.A. in 1963. Liu taught junior high and senior high school-level history in the San Francisco Bay Area cities of Richmond and El Cerrito, California from 1964 until 1978. She also served as executive director of the Richmond Federation of Teachers from 1975 to 1978. In 1982, Liu completed a teaching and administrative credential at the University of California, Berkeley.

== Political career ==
Before serving in the Senate, Liu served in the State Assembly. Prior to the Assembly, Liu served on the city council of La Cañada Flintridge, a small city in the Cresenta Valley near Pasadena, from 1992 until 2000, including two terms as its mayor.

In the 2008 primary election for the California Senate seat, she initially faced opposition from former Assembly Majority Leader Dario Frommer. However, Frommer decided to drop out before the election.

=== Legislation ===
Among her major accomplishments in the Senate has been the enactment of Senate Bill 110, the Crime Victims with Disabilities Act of 2010. Passed unanimously by the Legislature and signed into law by Governor Arnold Schwarzenegger, the bill assures that abuse and neglect of people with disabilities and elders are treated as crimes.

Senator Liu's SB 42 (2015) – Postsecondary Education Goals bill coordinates California's Higher Education segments (U.C. and C.S.U.), but it was vetoed by Governor Jerry Brown.

Senator Liu voted in favor of California Senate Constitutional Amendment No.5. The proposed bill would have asked California voters to consider repealing provisions of Proposition 209, thus permitting state universities to consider an applicant's race, ethnicity or national origin in making admissions decisions. The proposed amendment resulted in controversy. In a Facebook response, Liu indicated that California Proposition 209 set "outdated barriers" to groups of "underrepresented students eligible for U.C. and C.S.U." and that their enrollment "has not kept pace with the proportion of the high school graduating class they now represent." Senator Liu, along with former senators Leland Yee and Ted Lieu, who had also voted for the bill, ultimately issued a joint statement calling for the bill to be withheld pending further consultations with the "affected communities."

== Personal life ==
Liu is married to Michael Peevey, who was appointed to the California Public Utilities Commission by Governor Gray Davis, and later was named president of the commission by Governor Arnold Schwarzenegger, where he served until retiring in 2014.

They have three children and four grandchildren.
