= Local ordinance =

Ordinance applying to a municipality or other locality

A local ordinance is a law issued by a local government such as a municipality, county, parish, prefecture, or the like.

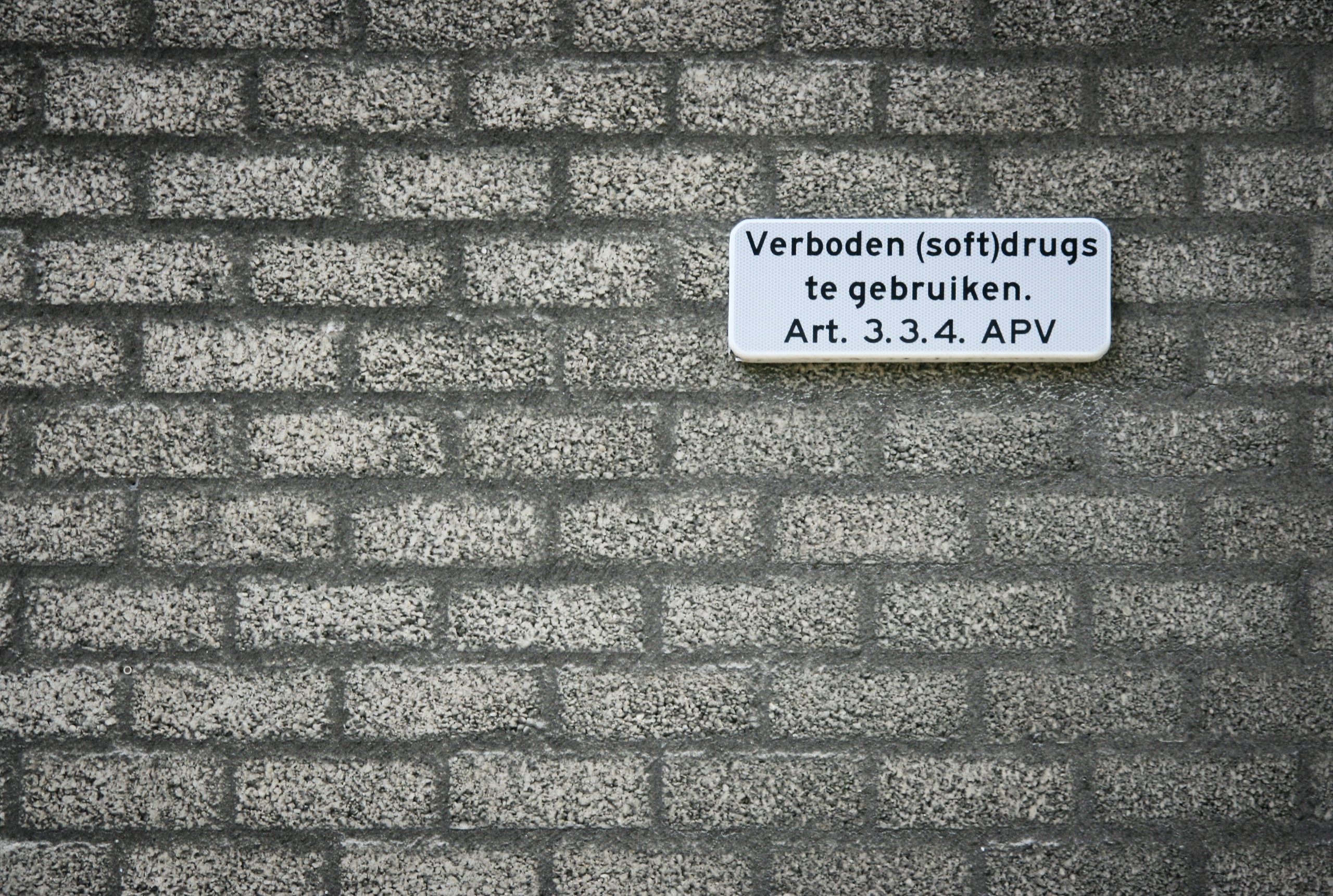
Drug use forbidden by local ordinance in Rotterdam, Netherlands

== Hong Kong ==
In Hong Kong, all laws enacted by the territory's Legislative Council remain to be known as ordinances (Chinese: 條例; Jyutping: tiu^{4}lai^{6}) after the transfer of the territory's sovereignty to China in 1997.

== Germany ==
The German Constitution grants the federated states certain exclusive rights including police and public order powers. The 16 state governments delegate many of their responsibilities and powers to local authorities. Local authorities have powers to pass local ordinances (Satzungen) e.g. to determine the use of land, planning questions, public order, emergency and transport issues etc. The ordinance must follow a public disclosure and consultation procedure and then approved by the local assembly as well as the elected representative of the executive (e.g. the mayor). The state authorities or stakeholders, including citizens who can show that they have a sufficiently strong interest to establish standing, may object to the final implementation. If the conflict cannot be resolved, the courts may be asked to rule on whether or not the ordinance is valid or if may strike if it violates state law or the state constitution.

== Japan ==
In Japan, ordinances (条例, jōrei) may be passed by any prefecture or municipality under authority granted by Article 94 of the Constitution.

There must generally be a statutory basis for an ordinance, the ordinance must be in compliance with any overlapping statutes (although it may impose a stricter standard or penalty), and the ordinance must be related to the affairs of the local government in question.

Ordinances must generally be approved by a local assembly and promulgated by the mayor or governor of the local government in question, who may demand a second vote but may not veto the ordinance.

Under the Local Autonomy Law, an ordinance may impose a penalty of up to two years imprisonment and/or 1 million yen in fines, although any penalty under an ordinance must be prescribed in accordance with the Code of Criminal Procedure. There are even some ordinances, such as bans on smoking on the street, for which the police in some districts state that there is no penalty for failure to obey the ordinance.

== United Kingdom ==
=== British colonies ===
All laws enacted by the legislature of British colonies are referred to as ordinances, which sometimes delegate power to other parties (usually government departments) to make subsidiary legislations that supplement the ordinances.

=== Crown dependencies ===
There are three Crown dependencies. In Guernsey, ordinances (ordonnances) are used for secondary legislation that does not warrant a project de loi which requires royal assent. Similar secondary legislation exists in Jersey. The Isle of Man also has secondary legislation below the act of Tynwald.

== United States ==
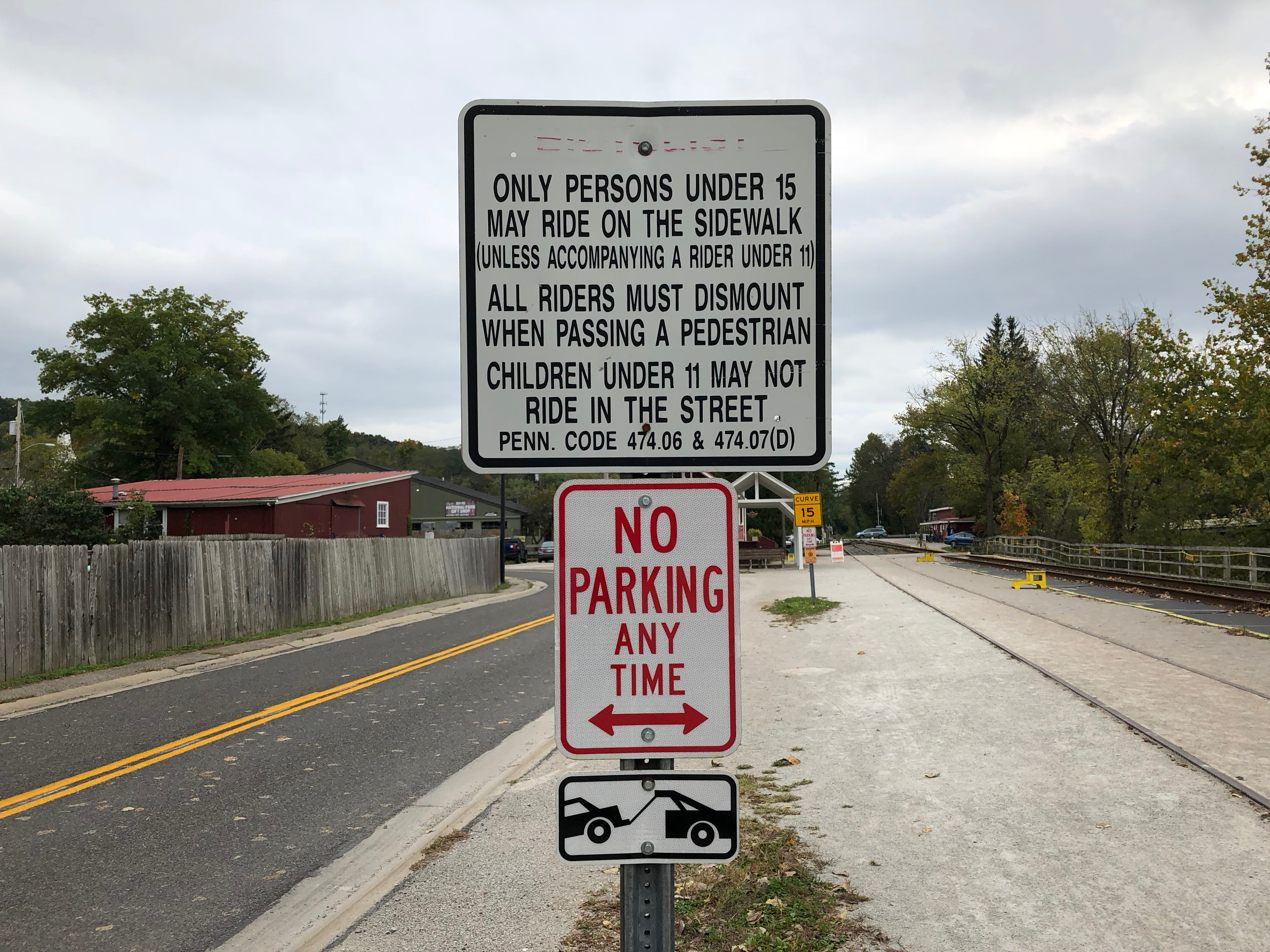
A regulatory sign in Peninsula, Ohio, describes the local ordinances that apply to cyclists.

In the United States, these laws are enforced locally in addition to state law and federal law. In states such as Connecticut, legislative bodies at the local level develop city and town ordinances to govern the public.

However, because of the Double Jeopardy Clause of the Fifth Amendment to the United States Constitution, for criminal processing purposes a local ordinance is considered the same as a state law, statute or ordinance, meaning if someone is charged with an offense punishable under a local ordinance and a state law, they can be prosecuted under one or the other, but not both, and a conviction or acquittal under a local ordinance or a state law prohibits a second trial on the same offense under the other one.

In all states, a city or county may enact a local ordinance as a criminal law that covers the same crime or violation as a state law but only if the penalty provided by the local ordinance is higher than the state statute. A local ordinance cannot be used to create a lesser penalty for a crime or traffic offense than state law. For example, if a state's law set a minimum penalty of $30 for driving faster than 25 mph on residential streets, in such states allowing local ordinance with harsher penalties to duplicate state laws, a local jurisdiction could enact its own local ordinance on the same subject only if the penalty under the local ordinance was greater than $30. A local law in such states could also provide for punishment of criminal offenses if a higher penalty was imposed. If state law punished conviction for manslaughter with 20 years in prison, for a local ordinance to be valid it would have to provide a minimum punishment of at least 20 years and one day.

In some states, local law cannot duplicate state law and some subjects are completely prohibited from being covered by local ordinance. For example, in Maryland, cities, towns and counties are expressly prohibited from passing gun control laws or other local ordinances dealing with the possession, carrying, and ownership of firearms or ammunition, and state laws on the subject are exclusively controlling.

== See also ==
- Moratorium
- Infraction
- Bylaw
- Legal code (municipal)
