= City court =

Court with jurisdiction limited to a city or other municipality

A city court or municipal court is a court of law with jurisdiction limited to a city or other municipality. It typically addresses "violations of city ordinances and may also have jurisdiction over minor criminal cases...and over certain civil cases." Examples include Moscow City Court in Russia, Municipal Court of Chicago and New York City Civil Court in the United States.

== See also ==
- Legal code (municipal)
- County court
- District court
- Inferior courts of the United States
