= California's 44th State Assembly district =

American legislative district

Current assemblymember
Nick Schultz; D–Burbank
- Population (2010) • Voting age • Citizen voting age: 462,271; 338,873; 261,592
- Demographics: 45.30% White; 2.07% Black; 42.55% Latino; 8.69% Asian; 0.50% Native American; 0.27% Hawaiian/Pacific Islander; 0.21% other; 0.41% remainder of multiracial
- Registered voters: 241,389
- Registration: 41.85% Democratic; 31.66% Republican; 21.76% No party preference

California's 44th State Assembly district is one of 80 California State Assembly districts. It is currently represented by Democrat Nick Schultz of Burbank.

== District profile ==
The district is located in the southeastern end of the San Fernando Valley in Los Angeles County.

== Election results from statewide races ==
Year	Office	Results
2021	Recall	No 56.6 – 43.4%
2020	President	Biden 59.3 - 36.9%
2018	Governor	Newsom 55.9 – 44.1%
2018	Senator	Feinstein 51.9 – 48.1%
2016	President	Clinton 57.1 – 37.0%
2016	Senator	Harris 61.2 – 38.8%
2014	Governor	Brown 53.2 – 47.8%
2012	President	Obama 52.4 – 45.5%
2012	Senator	Feinstein 54.4 – 45.6%

== List of assembly members representing the district ==
Due to redistricting, the 44th district has been moved around different parts of the state. The current iteration resulted from the 2021 redistricting by the California Citizens Redistricting Commission.

Member	Party	Years served	Counties represented	Notes
Frederick M. Lovell	Republican	January 5, 1885 – January 3, 1887	San Francisco	
Richard Cohen	Democratic	January 3, 1887 – January 7, 1889	San Francisco	
H. H. Black	Democratic	January 7, 1889 – January 5, 1891	San Francisco	
George A. Wentworth	Republican	January 5, 1891 – January 2, 1893	San Francisco	
James McGown	Republican	January 2, 1893 – January 7, 1895	San Francisco	
Louis P. Zocchi	Republican	January 7, 1895 – January 4, 1897	San Francisco	
Edward S. Ryan	Democratic	January 4, 1897 – January 2, 1899	San Francisco	
Michael H. Barry	Republican	January 2, 1899 – January 1, 1901	San Francisco	
August A. Cavagnaro	Democratic	January 1, 1901 – January 5, 1903	San Francisco	
James Durham Hart	Republican	January 5, 1903 – January 2, 1905	San Francisco	
Mel Vogel	Republican	January 2, 1905 – January 4, 1909	San Francisco	
George Mairs Perine	Republican	January 4, 1909 – January 2, 1911	San Francisco	
Victor A. Sbragia	Republican	January 2, 1911 – January 6, 1913	San Francisco	
Lewis Dan Bohnett	Republican	January 6, 1913 – January 4, 1915	Santa Clara	
Theodore McKay Wright	Progressive	January 4, 1915 – January 8, 1917	Santa Clara	
Theodore V. Brown	Republican	January 8, 1917 – January 6, 1919	Santa Clara	
Theodore McKay Wright	Republican	January 6, 1919 – January 5, 1931	Santa Clara	
Maurice S. Meeker	Republican	January 5, 1931 – January 2, 1933	Fresno	
Clare Woolwine	Republican	January 2, 1933 – January 7, 1935	Los Angeles	
John B. Pelletier	Democratic	January 7, 1935 – November 29, 1946	Los Angeles	Died in office.
Vacant		November 29, 1946 – April 10, 1947	Los Angeles	
Edward E. Elliott	Democratic	April 10, 1947 – January 5, 1953	Los Angeles	Sworn in after winning special election.
Herbert R. Klocksiem	Republican	January 5, 1953 – January 5, 1959	Los Angeles	
Joseph M. Kennick	Democratic	January 5, 1959 – January 2, 1967	Los Angeles	
Mike Cullen	Democratic	January 2, 1967 – November 30, 1974	Los Angeles	
Alan Sieroty	Democratic	December 2, 1974 – March 24, 1977	Los Angeles	Resigned to take seat in State Senate after winning a special election.
Vacant		March 24, 1977 – July 6, 1977	Los Angeles	
Mel Levine	Democratic	July 6, 1977 – November 30, 1982	Los Angeles	Sworn in after winning special election.
Tom Hayden	Democratic	December 6, 1982 – November 30, 1992	Los Angeles	
Bill Hoge	Republican	December 7, 1992 – November 30, 1996	Los Angeles	
Jack Scott	Democratic	December 2, 1996 – November 30, 2000	Los Angeles	
Carol Liu	Democratic	December 4, 2000 – November 30, 2006	Los Angeles	
Anthony Portantino	Democratic	December 6, 2006 – November 30, 2012	Los Angeles	
Jeff Gorell	Republican	December 3, 2012 – November 30, 2014	Los Angeles	
Jacqui Irwin	Democratic	December 1, 2014 – November 30, 2022	Los Angeles	
Laura Friedman	Democratic	December 7, 2022 – November 30, 2024	Los Angeles	
Nick Schultz	Democratic	December 2, 2024 – present	Los Angeles	

== Election results (1990-present) ==
=== 2024 ===
2024 California State Assembly 44th district election
Primary election
Party	Candidate	Votes	%
Democratic	Nick Schultz	31,121	28.3
Republican	Tony Rodriguez	28,280	25.7
Democratic	Ed Han	17,589	16.0
Democratic	Elen Asatryan	14,692	13.3
Democratic	Steve Pierson	8,508	7.7
Democratic	Carmenita Helligar	6,178	5.6
No party preference	Adam Summer	2,224	2.0
Democratic	Adam Pryor	1,566	1.4
Total votes		110,158	100.0
General election
Democratic	Nick Schultz	143,625	65.9
Republican	Tony Rodriguez	74,316	34.1
Total votes		217,941	100.0
Democratic hold			

=== 2022 ===
2022 California State Assembly 44th district election
Primary election
Party	Candidate	Votes	%
Democratic	Laura Friedman (incumbent)	80,209	73.2
Republican	Barry Curtis Jacobsen	29,381	26.8
Total votes		109,590	100.0
General election
Democratic	Laura Friedman (incumbent)	113,380	71.4
Republican	Barry Curtis Jacobsen	45,519	28.6
Total votes		158,899	100.0
Democratic hold			

=== 2020 ===
2020 California State Assembly 44th district election
Primary election
Party	Candidate	Votes	%
Democratic	Jacqui Irwin (incumbent)	73,294	62.2
Republican	Denise Pedrow	44,534	37.8
Total votes		117,828	100.0
General election
Democratic	Jacqui Irwin (incumbent)	132,679	60.7
Republican	Denise Pedrow	86,051	39.3
Total votes		218,730	100.0
Democratic hold			

=== 2018 ===
2018 California State Assembly 44th district election
Primary election
Party	Candidate	Votes	%
Democratic	Jacqui Irwin (incumbent)	44,028	51.9
Republican	Ronda Baldwin-Kennedy	37,342	44.0
Democratic	Robert Zelinsky	3,411	4.0
Total votes		84,781	100.0
General election
Democratic	Jacqui Irwin (incumbent)	95,622	58.9
Republican	Ronda Baldwin-Kennedy	66,758	42.1
Total votes		162,380	100.0
Democratic hold			

=== 2016 ===
2016 California State Assembly 44th district election
Primary election
Party	Candidate	Votes	%
Democratic	Jacqui Irwin (incumbent)	63,992	60.9
Republican	Kerry J. Nelson	41,145	39.1
Total votes		105,137	100.0
General election
Democratic	Jacqui Irwin (incumbent)	107,084	59.0
Republican	Kerry J. Nelson	74,417	41.0
Total votes		181,501	100.0
Democratic hold			

=== 2014 ===
2014 California State Assembly 44th district election
Primary election
Party	Candidate	Votes	%
Democratic	Jacqui Irwin	24,225	44.7
Republican	Rob McCoy	16,811	31.0
Republican	Mario de la Piedra	13,116	24.2
Total votes		54,152	100.0
General election
Democratic	Jacqui Irwin	57,098	52.3
Republican	Rob McCoy	52,085	47.7
Total votes		109,183	100.0
Democratic gain from Republican			

=== 2012 ===
2012 California State Assembly 44th district election
Primary election
Party	Candidate	Votes	%
Republican	Jeff Gorell (incumbent)	38,263	58.1
Democratic	Eileen MacEnery	15,343	23.3
Democratic	Thomas Mullens	12,226	18.6
Total votes		65,832	100.0
General election
Republican	Jeff Gorell (incumbent)	86,132	52.9
Democratic	Eileen MacEnery	76,805	47.1
Total votes		162,937	100.0
Republican gain from Democratic			

=== 2010 ===
2010 California State Assembly 44th district election
Party	Candidate	Votes	%
Democratic	Anthony Portantino (incumbent)	81,347	63.8
Republican	Alvaro G. Day	41,571	32.6
Libertarian	Eytan Kollin	4,613	3.6
Total votes		127,531	100.0
Democratic hold			

=== 2008 ===
2008 California State Assembly 44th district election
Party	Candidate	Votes	%
Democratic	Anthony Portantino (incumbent)	102,896	63.7
Republican	Brian Fuller	49,246	30.5
Libertarian	Thomas Logan	9,446	5.8
Total votes		161,588	100.0
Democratic hold			

=== 2006 ===
2006 California State Assembly 44th district election
Party	Candidate	Votes	%
Democratic	Anthony Portantino	66,206	58.3
Republican	Scott Carwile	37,699	33.2
Libertarian	Barron Yanaga	4,969	4.4
Green	Ricardo Costa	4,662	4.1
Total votes		113,536	100.0
Democratic hold			

=== 2004 ===
2004 California State Assembly 44th district election
Party	Candidate	Votes	%
Democratic	Carol Liu (incumbent)	106,179	65.6
Republican	Lynn Gabriel	55,655	34.4
Total votes		161,834	100.0
Democratic hold			

=== 2002 ===
2002 California State Assembly 44th district election
Party	Candidate	Votes	%
Democratic	Carol Liu (incumbent)	60,570	60.2
Republican	Dan O'Connell	37,112	36.9
Libertarian	Bob New	3,015	2.9
Total votes		100,697	100.0
Democratic hold			

=== 2000 ===
2000 California State Assembly 44th district election
Party	Candidate	Votes	%
Democratic	Carol Liu	92,081	62.2
Republican	Susan Carpenter-McMillan	48,992	33.1
Libertarian	Jerry Douglas	6,883	4.7
Total votes		147,956	100.0
Democratic hold			

=== 1998 ===
1998 California State Assembly 44th district election
Party	Candidate	Votes	%
Democratic	Jack Scott (incumbent)	65,652	56.5
Republican	Ken La Corte	46,652	40.1
Libertarian	Ken Saurenman	1,757	1.5
Green	Shawn Waddell	1,474	1.3
Reform	Philip Corvalan	689	0.6
Total votes		116,224	100.0
Democratic hold			

=== 1996 ===
1996 California State Assembly 44th district election
Party	Candidate	Votes	%
Democratic	Jack Scott	72,591	53.0
Republican	Bill Hoge (incumbent)	60,124	43.9
Libertarian	Ted Brown	4,324	3.2
Total votes		137,039	100.0
Democratic gain from Republican			

=== 1994 ===
1994 California State Assembly 44th district election
Party	Candidate	Votes	%
Republican	Bill Hoge (incumbent)	64,276	53.3
Democratic	Bruce Philpott	50,370	41.7
Libertarian	Ken Saurenman	5,980	5.0
Total votes		120,626	100.0
Republican hold			

=== 1992 ===
1992 California State Assembly 44th district election
Party	Candidate	Votes	%
Republican	Bill Hoge	77,044	51.8
Democratic	Jonathan S. Fuhrman	65,332	44.0
Libertarian	Ken Saurenman	6,270	4.2
Total votes		148,646	100.0
Republican gain from Democratic			

=== 1990 ===
1990 California State Assembly 44th district election
Party	Candidate	Votes	%
Democratic	Tom Hayden (incumbent)	58,427	56.2
Republican	Fred Betela	39,869	38.3
Libertarian	Rebecca Donner	3,739	3.6
Peace and Freedom	Timothy Andrew Burdick	1,981	1.9
No party	Andrew Cota (write-in)	3	0.0
Total votes		104,019	100.0
Democratic hold			

== See also ==
- California State Assembly
- California State Assembly districts
- Districts in California
