= Peoples Temple in San Francisco =

Religious group's social and political activities base

Coordinates: 37.7839°N 122.4336°W

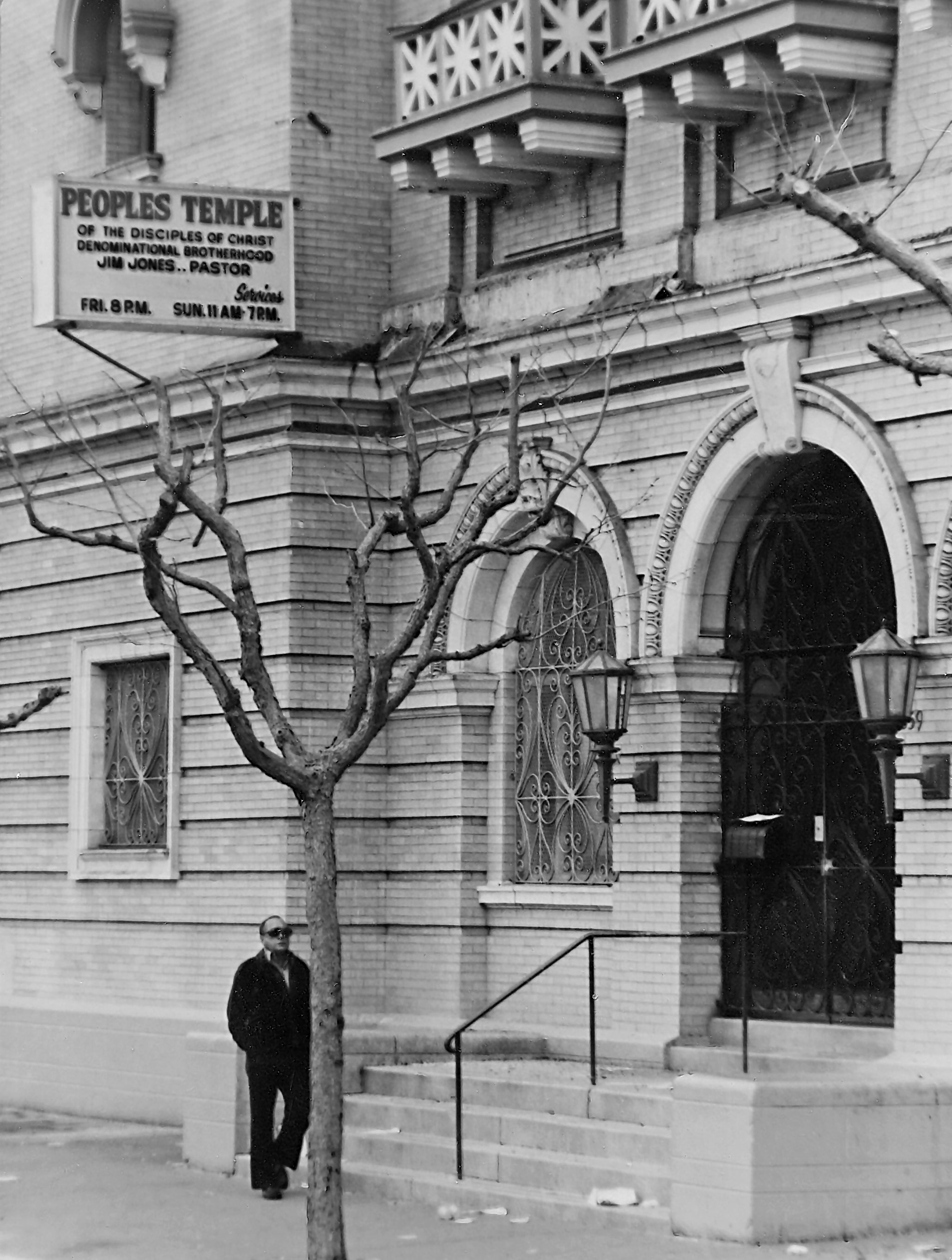
The Peoples Temple headquarters, 1859 Geary Blvd., San Francisco, 1978

The Peoples Temple, the new religious movement which came to be known for the mass killings at Jonestown, was headquartered in San Francisco, California, United States from the early to mid-1970s until the Temple's move to Guyana in 1977. During this period, the Temple and its founder, Reverend Jim Jones, rose to national prominence thanks to Jones' interest in social and political causes, and wielded a significant amount of influence in San Francisco's city government.

== History ==
Some of the Peoples Temple's California Locations

The Peoples Temple began in 1955 as a racially integrated Christian church founded by Reverend Jim Jones. While the Temple originated in suburban Indiana, the congregation moved to Redwood Valley, California in the late 1960s after Jones predicted a nuclear apocalypse that would facilitate the beginning of a socialist Eden on earth. By the mid-1970s, the organization possessed over a dozen locations in California, including in San Francisco and Los Angeles.

Its headquarters later moved into San Francisco, where Jones remained until July 1977, when he fled with almost 1,000 Temple members to the cult's remote settlement at Jonestown, Guyana following an investigative article in New West magazine.

== San Francisco activities ==
When the Temple expanded its operations into the San Francisco Bay Area in the 1970s, its staff concentrated on advertising the organization's bus caravans to attract new converts, including the handing out of free trinkets. By 1972, despite the Temple still calling its Redwood Valley facility the "mother church" of a statewide movement, moving the seat of power to an urban area seemed a strategic necessity. The Temple had previously held services in San Francisco and Los Angeles since 1970.

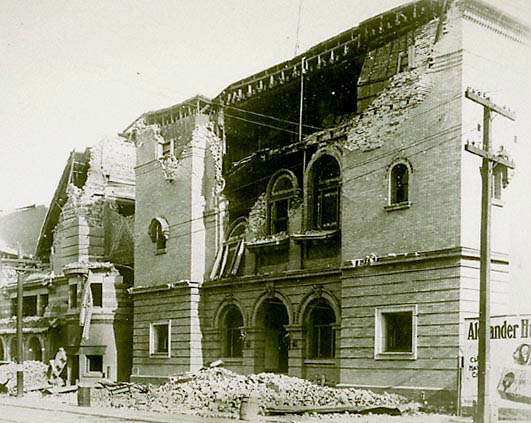
The building at 1859 Geary Blvd after the 1906 earthquake.

In 1971, the Temple established a permanent facility in San Francisco at 1859 Geary Boulevard, an old building in the city's Western Addition that used to be a Scottish Rite temple; a Los Angeles facility followed two years later. The Temple purchased the Geary Boulevard building for $122,500 in 1972. While the Temple's Los Angeles facility initially attracted a larger, mostly African-American membership, the Temple later enticed hundreds of devoted Los Angeles members to move north to San Francisco to attend Temple meetings at Geary Boulevard.

By August 1975, Jones had completely abandoned prior plans to make Redwood Valley an internal "promised land." The reversal of the direction of Temple efforts from rural areas back into urban areas, where it had focused when located in Indiana, was complete. The liberal, counter-cultural stronghold of San Francisco better reflected the Temple's politics than conservative Indiana, and relocating to San Francisco permitted Jones and his followers to be open with their ideology.

However, Jones' faith healing ceremonies were problematic for the Temple, as they also drew some religious conservatives who were less likely to join a socialist organization. Because of this and the Temple's constant fear of conspiracies by outsiders opposing its message, new members were carefully screened.

Entrants to the Geary Boulevard facility were not permitted free access to the inner areas of the buildings. Rather, they were greeted by an amicable covert interrogation party that sized up visitors, with "suspicious" figures told to wait indefinitely in the lobby. The Temple assigned admitted attendees an "interpreter" of sorts to watch their reactions to the meetings and "explain" Jones' statements. If the attendee seemed non-objectionable, a five-week period of observation began, which usually involved sifting through the attendees' trash by the third or fourth week.

== San Francisco Temple life ==
As the Temple shifted its focus to cities in the mid-1970s, communes became an important means of tightening controls and improving finances. Temple members in San Francisco were urged to live a communal lifestyle. Members elevated to the Temple's central governing body, the Planning Commission, were expected to "go communal." The money saved from communal living was to be donated to the Temple.

Children of Temple members would also be raised "communally," often in other Temple communes or through guardianships. The Temple stressed physical discipline, which involved repeated paddlings of children with a wooden paddle in front of Temple members. The practice later turned into disciplinary boxing matches, where the disciplined child was outmatched by one or more other members. Later, adult Temple members were involved in both paddlings and boxing matches.

Planning Commission meetings in San Francisco would sometimes run all night. They often involved long "catharsis" sessions in which members would be called "on the floor" for emotional dissections, including why they were wearing nice clothes when others in the world were starving. Other members were expected to accuse those "on the floor" of various disallowed activities, while the Temple considered it improper for the accused to mount a defense. The Temple also asked adults to sign papers admitting various crimes and wrongdoings, including conspiring against the U.S. government, involvement in terrorist acts and molesting their own children. If such members attempted to leave the Temple, Jones threatened to release the statements.

The Temple converted some former real estate of its members into communal living units, and came to possess at least a dozen such locations scattered throughout San Francisco's Fillmore district. Communal members' possessions were sold through two Temple antique stores and through weekend flea markets. Because of commune size constraints, Temple security chief Jim McElvane shot and buried communal members' pets in mass graves.

== Media alliances ==
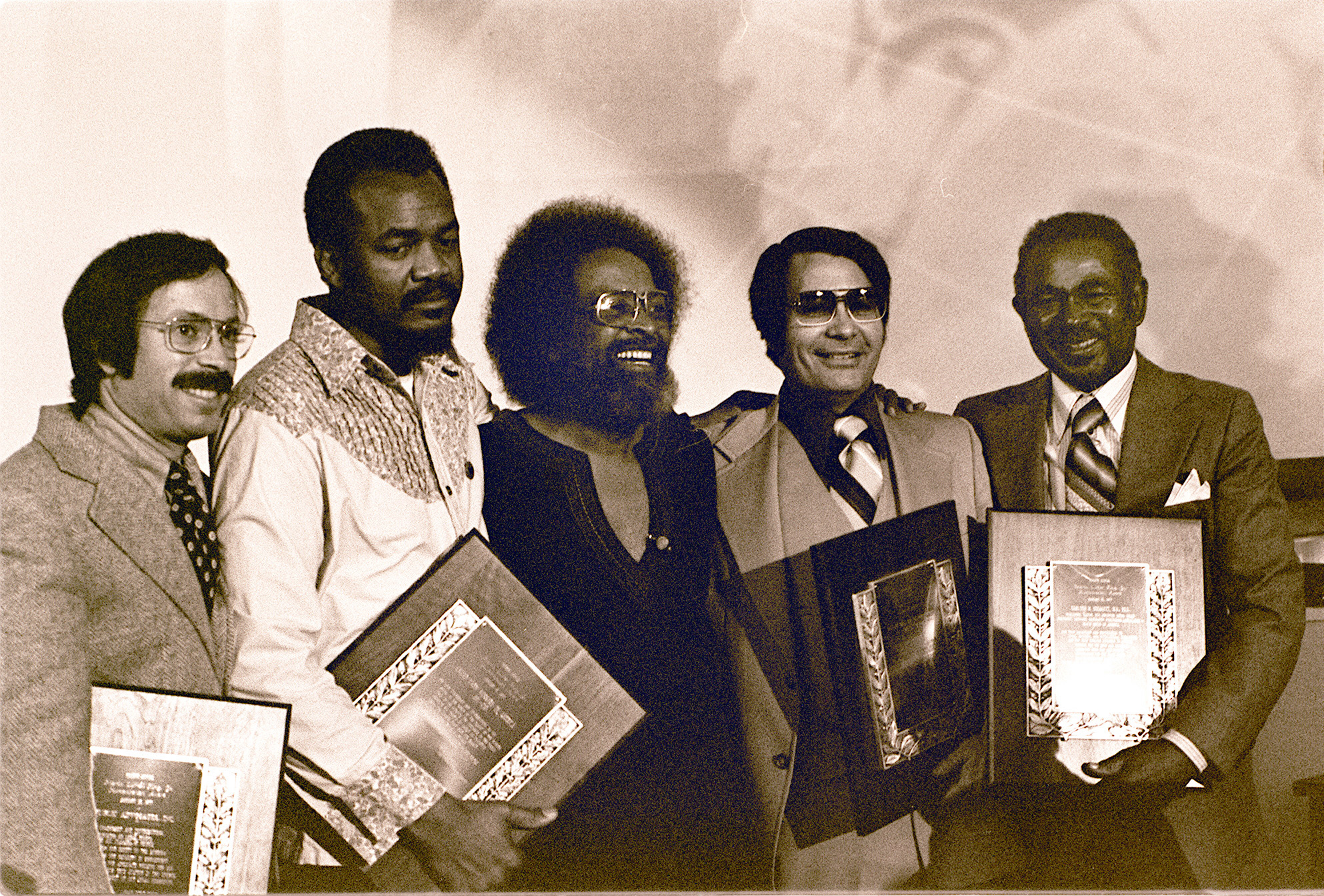
Dr. Carlton B. Goodlett (far right) and Rev. Jim Jones (second from right) were recipients of the Martin Luther King Jr. Humanitarian award given at Glide Memorial Church January 1977

In 1972, Jones first met Dr. Carlton Goodlett, publisher of the San Francisco newspaper The Sun Reporter, which was targeted towards African-American readers. The two encountered each other at political rallies and at Goodlett's medical practice. The Sun Reporter soon thereafter presented the Temple with a "Special Merit Award." Temple media advisor Michael Prokes, a former reporter for a CBS affiliate, dined with Sun Reporter editor Tom Fleming and spoke of harassment of the Temple by the CIA and FBI.

The Temple and Goodlett soon forged an alliance, with Goodlett permitting the Temple to print its Peoples Forum newspaper on The Sun Reporter's presses. The deal was profitable for The Sun Reporter, and Jones and Goodlett entered into another media venture to invest and reorganize the Norfolk, Virginia newspaper The Journal and Guide. The Peoples Forum's first issue was published in 1973, with a large format issue first being published in 1976.

While Jones hoped to build the People's Forum into San Francisco's third largest daily paper behind the San Francisco Chronicle and San Francisco Examiner, and grossly exaggerated the circulation of the paper at "600,000", the paper only modestly grew to a circulation of closer to 60,000. While The Sun Reporter printed positive articles about the Temple, and despite his apparent close ties to Goodlett, Jones called the publisher a "Cadillac communist" behind his back.

Jones also cultivated other media relationships. At the Chronicle, famed columnist Herb Caen was the Temple's most widely read media acquaintance, while city editor Steven Gavin attended Temple services along with a Chronicle reporter. Several reporters at local newspapers and television stations also spoke favorably of the Temple.

Caen repeated some of Prokes' claims of orchestrated harassment by the CIA and FBI against the Temple in his columns. Jones also won the National Newspaper Publishers Association Man of the Year Award, given by the Black Press of America. The Temple also broadcast a weekly hour-long radio show that ran in several cities, including KFAX in San Francisco.

The Temple carefully rehearsed any meetings Jones would have with reporters, staging visits to the Geary Boulevard facility, permitting reporters to see only specific parts of the building, and stationing Temple members in places to compliment the reporter.

== Political beginnings ==
=== Political volunteerism ===
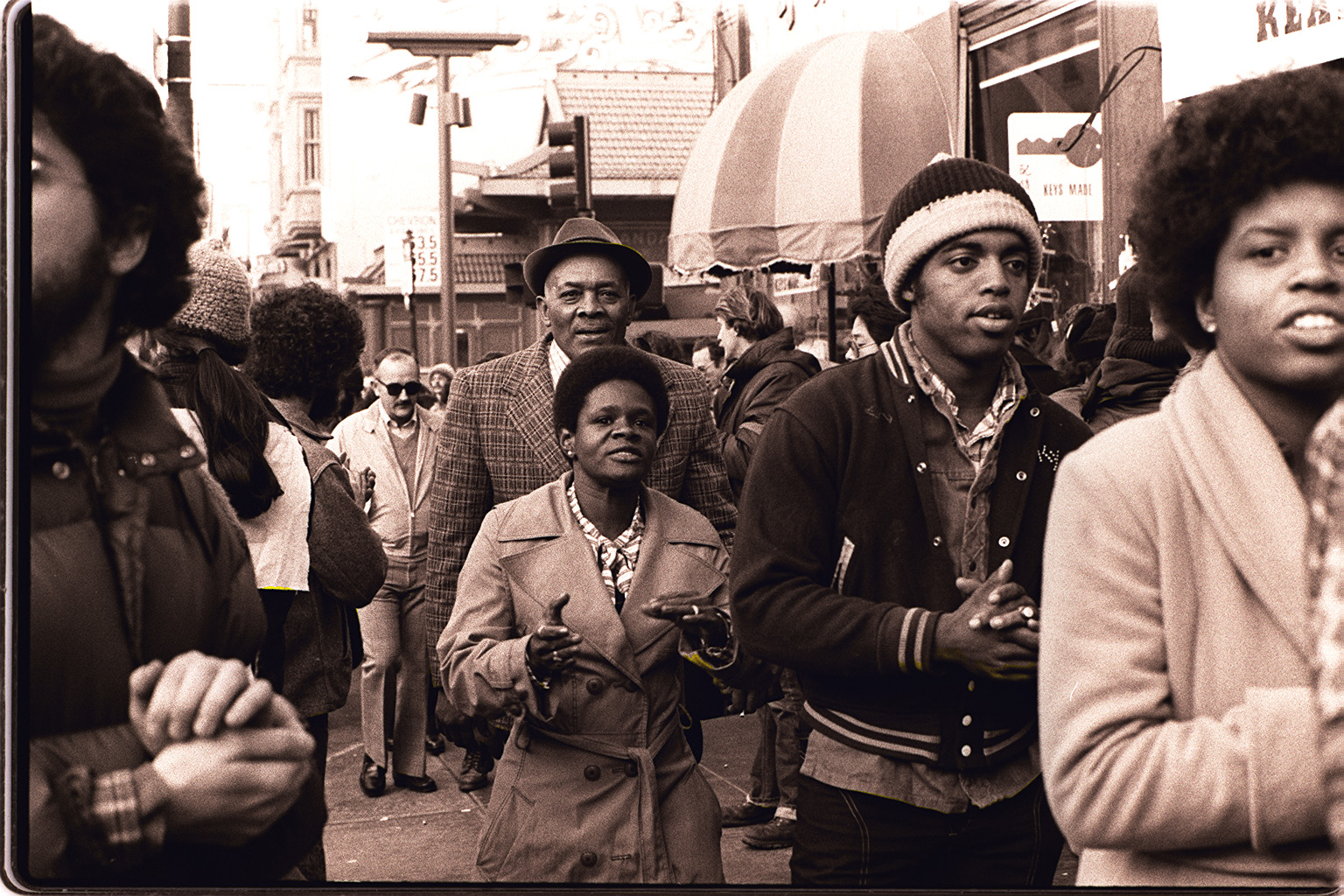
Temple members march at the International Hotel, 848 Kearny Street in San Francisco, January 1977.

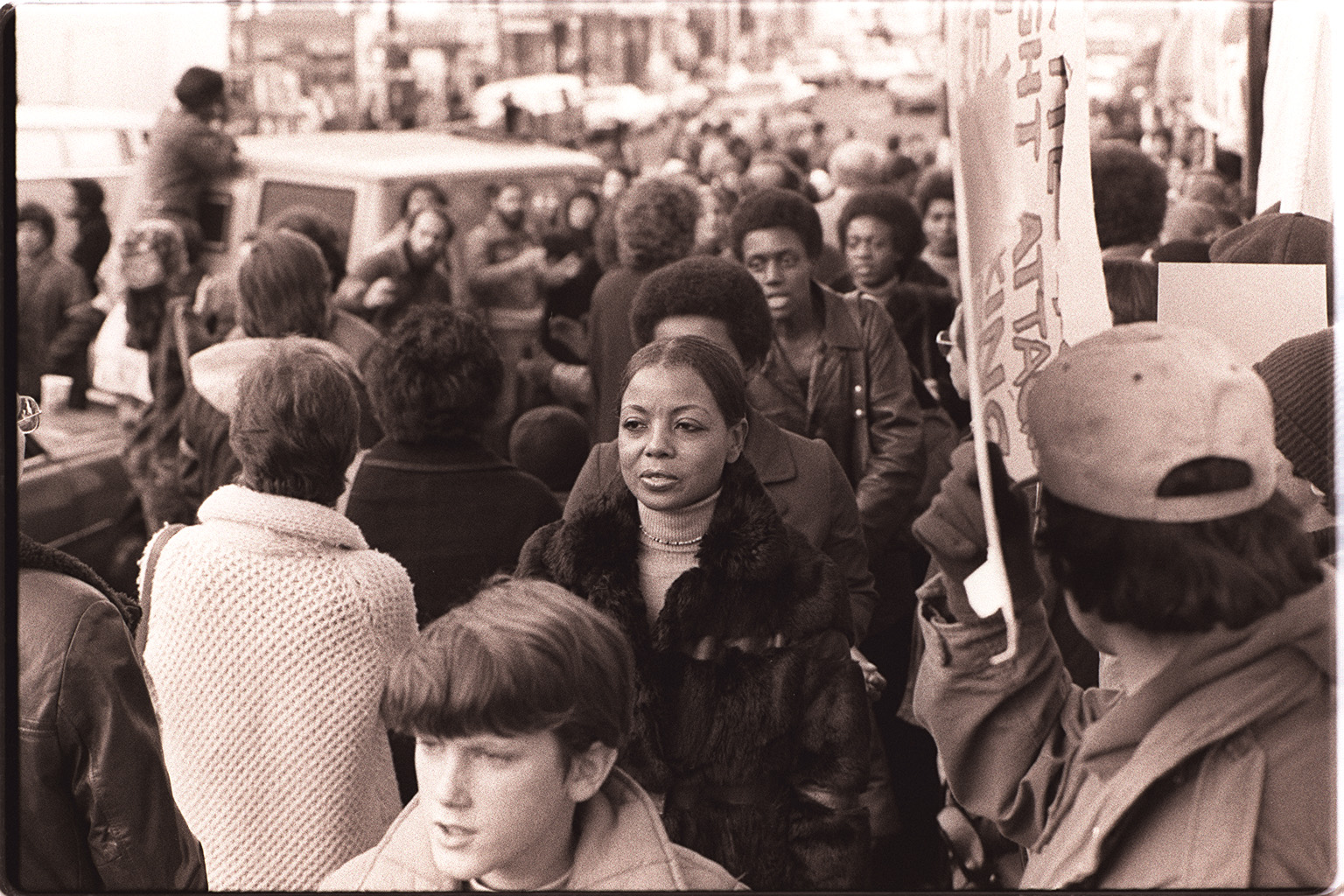
Members of Peoples Temple at 1977 rally in San Francisco's Chinatown included youth as well as middle-aged and the elderly.

Several political developments in San Francisco in the mid-1970s, including a shift from citywide elections of county supervisors to district elections as well as campaign spending limits and reporting requirements, bestowed unprecedented power on local neighborhood groups and civil organizations such as the Peoples Temple. The organization began distinguishing itself with an overtly political message. It participated in political processes and formed alliances, not just for the sake of expediency, but also out of genuine political sympathies. As the ideological direction of the Temple became more openly socialist, it depended more upon the political world.

Jones made it known that he was interested in politics, and Corey Buscher, former press secretary to Mayor George Moscone, stated that he "made his followers available to support progressive Democratic candidates," though earlier Jones had also supported at least some local Mendocino County Republicans. However, the Temple played a double game of working underground among progressive circles, assuming the political establishment consisted of "corrupt enemies", while working publicly in traditional channels to advance its own causes.

Buscher explained that, soon after the Geary Boulevard facility opened, it "became common knowledge that if you were going to run for office in San Francisco, and your constituency included the black, the young or the poor, you'd better have Jones in your corner." The Temple had 3,000 registered members, though it regularly drew that same number to its San Francisco services alone, whether or not these were registered. Some more recent accounts state the effective membership numbered perhaps 8,000.

Of particular interest to San Francisco politicians was the Temple's ability to produce 2,000 people for campaign activities with only six hours notice. Buscher stated that Jones offered thousands of "foot soldiers" willing to walk precincts and get out the vote, which was "an offer no politician in his right mind could refuse." Similarly, Mayor Art Agnos stated that, "If you were having a rally for a presidential candidate, you needed to fill up the crowd, you could always get busloads from Jim Jones' church."

Agar Jaicks, who was chairman of San Francisco County's Democratic Central Committee, referred to the Temple as "a ready-made volunteer workforce." Jaicks further explained that Jones was "a man who touched a component of the consensus power forces in the city, such as labor and ethnicity groups, and he was very strong in the Western Addition. So here was a guy who could provide workers for causes progressives cared about."

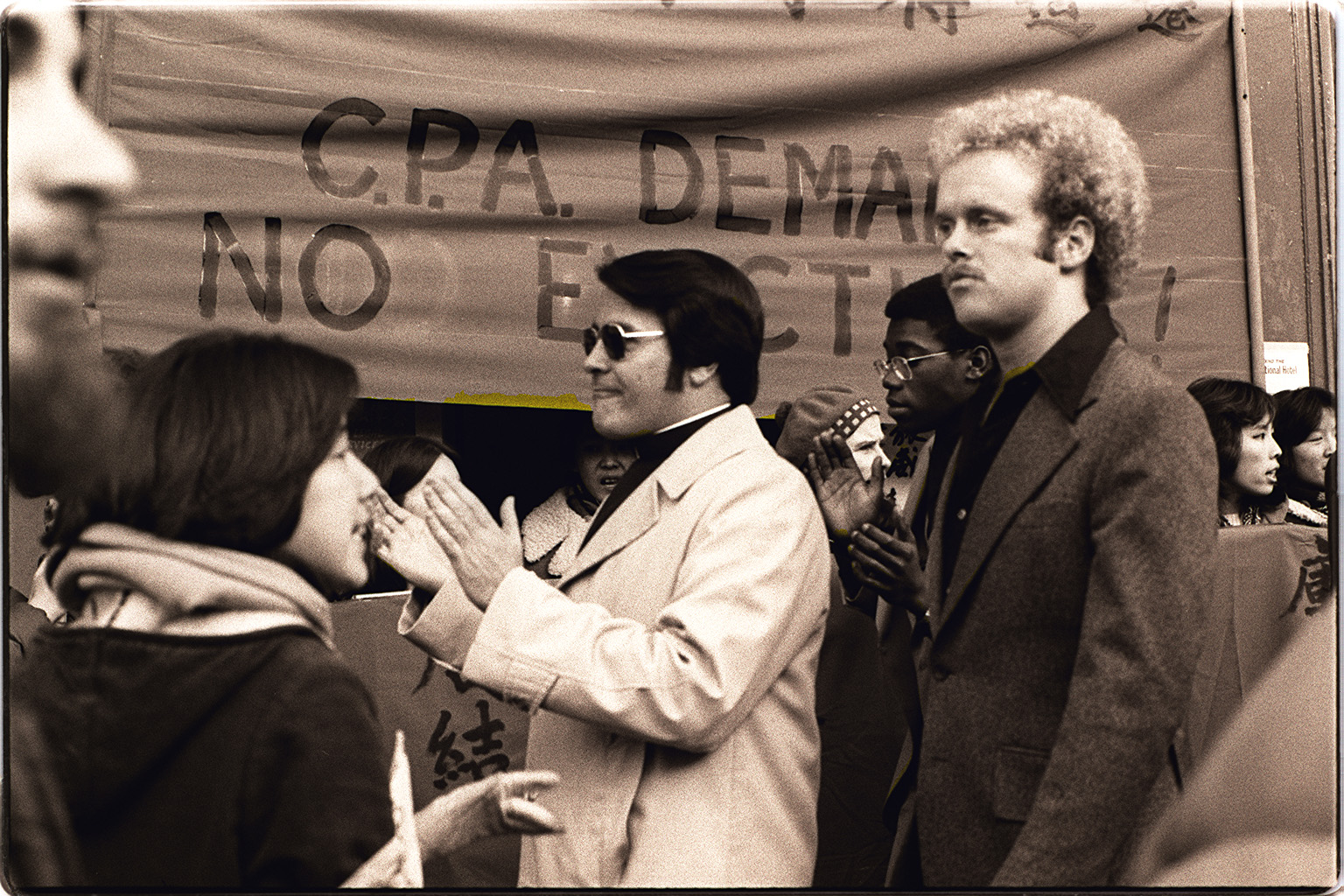
Reverend Jim Jones and bodyguard at the January 1977 rally in San Francisco's International Hotel in Chinatown

=== Introductions ===
California State Assemblyman Willie Brown first met Jones at the Bardelli's restaurant in Union Square. Later, Jones sent Prokes to Brown's office to interview him, future District Attorney Joseph Freitas and future Sheriff Richard Hongisto for a Temple-produced documentary film.

=== Involvement in George Moscone's 1975 mayoral race ===
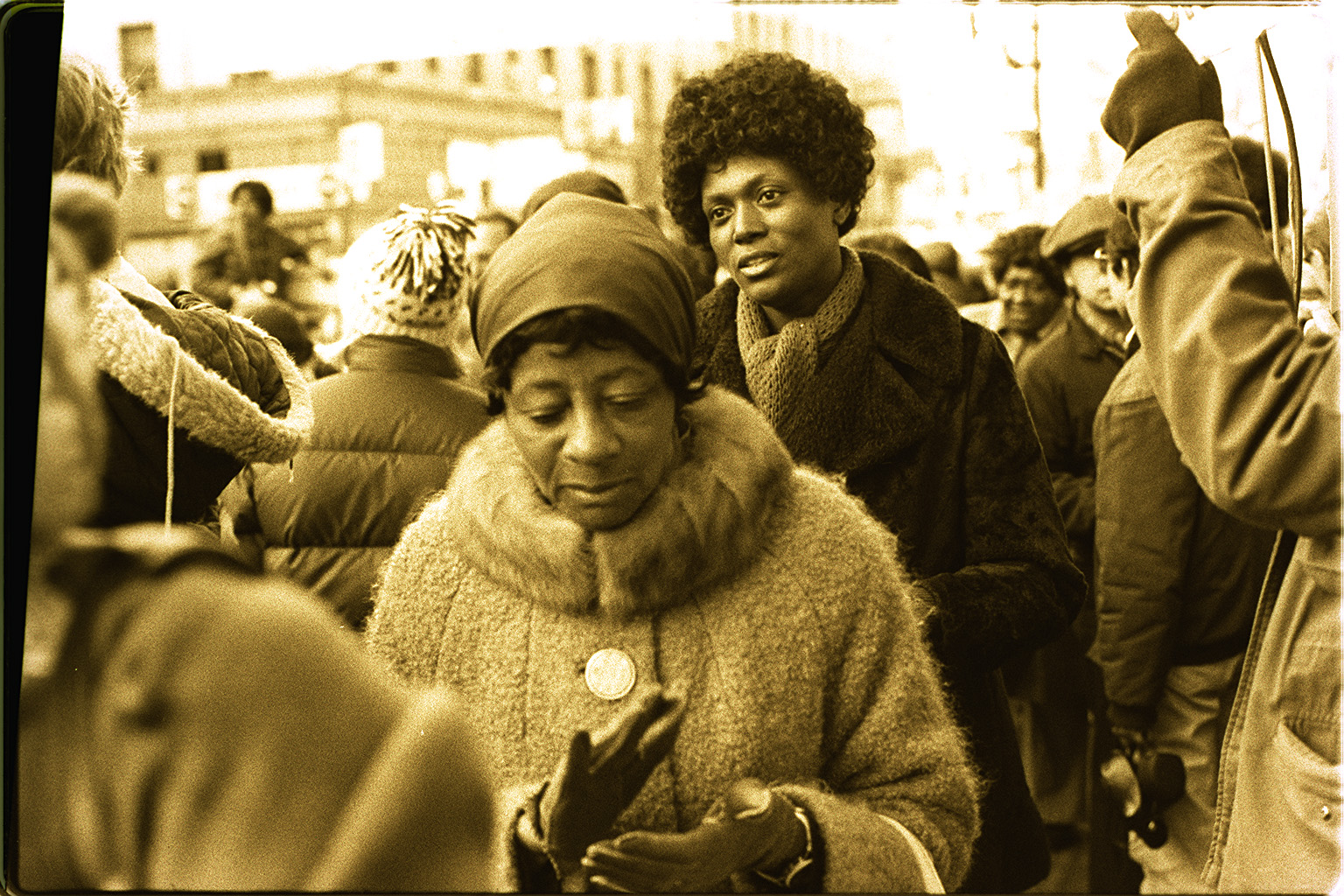
Ten busloads of Peoples Temple members attended an anti-eviction rally at the I-Hotel in January 1977.

In San Francisco's 1975 mayoral race, Democratic candidate George Moscone ran against Republican John Barbagelata. During the race, Moscone held a meeting with Jones and Prokes requesting Temple volunteers to perform campaign work. (Note: Three months after the tragedy, Prokes fatally shot himself at a press conference he called in Modesto, California. ("Statement of Michael Prokes.") Alternative Considerations of Jonestown and Peoples Temple. San Diego State University: Jonestown Project. Retrieved 22 September 2007. "Jonestown". Archived from the original on February 5, 2011.) Temple members subsequently saturated San Francisco neighborhoods, distributing slate cards for Moscone, Freitas, and Hongisto.

The Temple worked to get out the vote in precincts where Moscone received a 12-to-1 vote margin over Barbagelata. All three candidates won, with Moscone winning a close runoff by less than two percent of the vote. At the time of the election, a Moscone campaign aide stated, "Everybody talks about the labor unions and their power, but Jones turns out the troops."

After the election, Moscone and others believed that the Temple's efforts were instrumental in his close victory.

Barbagelata and others suspected election fraud on the part of the Temple, believing that followers of Jones who were not San Francisco residents had been transported into the city to vote. After the mass killings at Jonestown in 1978, Temple members revealed to The New York Times that the Temple had indeed arranged for "busloads" of members to be driven from Redwood Valley to vote for Moscone. A former Temple member stated that many of those members were not registered to vote in San Francisco, while another former member said that "Jones swayed elections."

Yet another former member stated of Jones that "he told us how to vote", stating that Temple members were required to produce booth stubs to prove that they voted, and that members who could not produce such stubs were "pushed around, shoved and physically abused." When asked how Jones could know for whom they voted, the member responded, "You don't understand, we wanted to do what he told us to.".

As San Francisco's newly elected district attorney, Freitas set up a special unit to investigate the election fraud charges. Freitas named Temple member Timothy Stoen, whom he had hired as an assistant district attorney, to lead the unit. Stoen employed Temple members as volunteers to help with work on the investigation. The Temple was not mentioned in the proceedings that followed. After the tragedy, Stoen, who had turned against the Temple in 1977, stated that he was not aware at an election fraud effort by the Temple at the time, but that such a plot could have happened without his knowledge because, "Jim Jones kept a lot of things from me."

=== Help with Harvey Milk's 1976 race for the California State Assembly ===
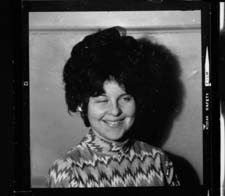
Sharon Amos.

Harvey Milk, who eventually became a member of the San Francisco Board of Supervisors, first became acquainted with the Temple while running for a seat in the California State Assembly against Art Agnos. Jones initially telephoned a Milk campaign worker and stated that he wished to back Milk, apologized for earlier backing Agnos, and said he would "make up for it" by sending volunteers to work on Milk's campaign.

When told by friend Michael Wong of Jones' earlier backing of Agnos, Milk retorted, "Well, fuck him. I'll take his workers, but that's the game Jim Jones plays." Temple member Sharon Amos organized the Temple's leafleting campaign for Milk. Amos requested the delivery of 30,000 pamphlets and Milk's campaign delivered them to the Temple.

=== Carter Administration encounters ===
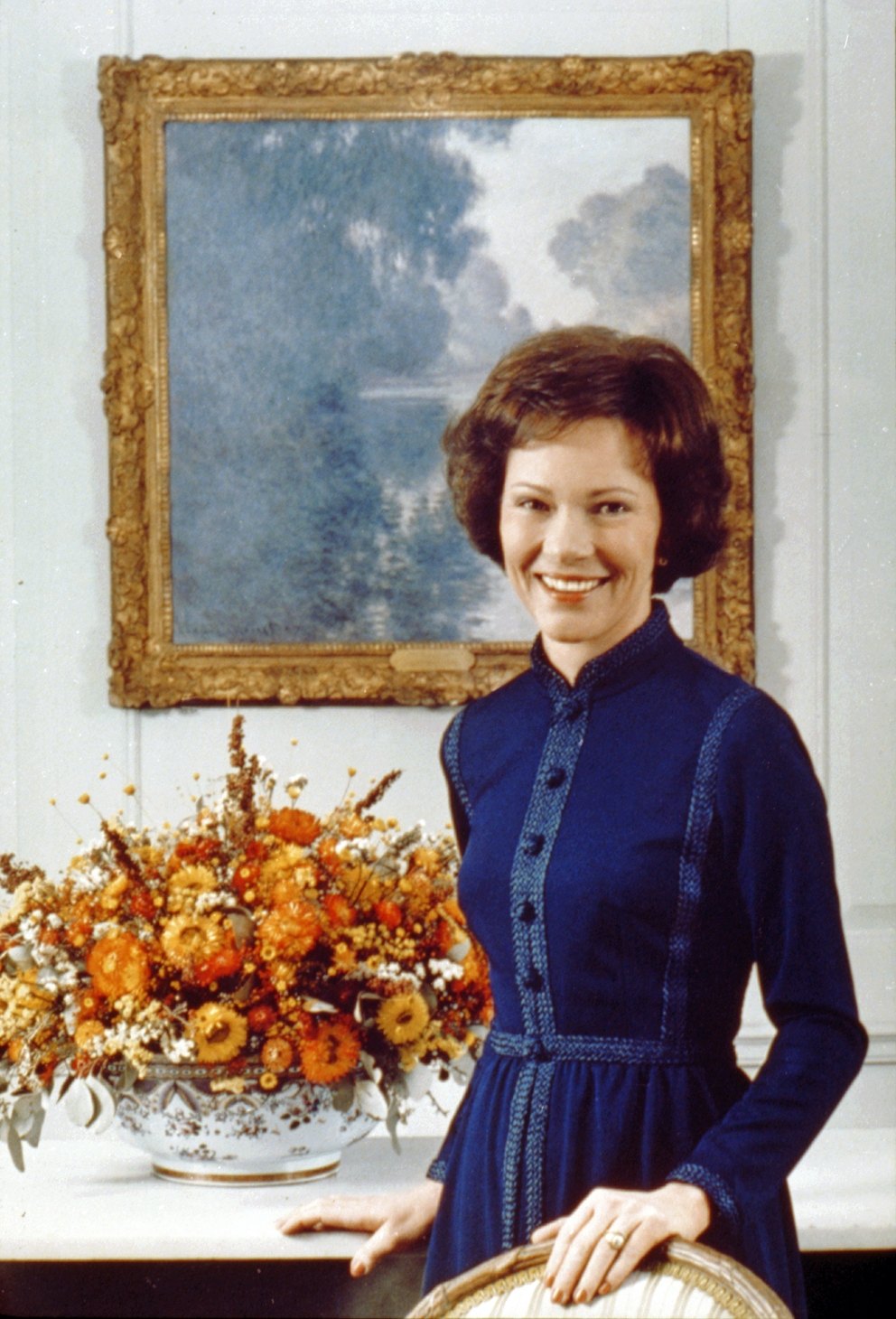
Rosalynn Carter.

After Jones' rise to political prominence in San Francisco, the Temple had a few meetings with members of the administration of President Jimmy Carter before the 1976 presidential campaign. During that campaign, Jones and Moscone met privately with Carter's running mate, Walter Mondale, on board his campaign plane at San Francisco International Airport. As soon as the encounter ended, Jones bandied it about to increase his standing with the government of Guyana, claiming he and Mondale engaged in private talks regarding outside attempts to destabilize the country.

In the fall of 1976, Jones and First Lady Rosalynn Carter both spoke at the grand opening of the San Francisco Democratic Party Headquarters. Temple members packed the audience, and Jones garnered louder applause when he spoke than Mrs. Carter. Mrs. Carter also met Jones for a private dinner at the Stanford Court Hotel, photos of which were printed in the Peoples Forum newspaper.

Mrs. Carter later telephoned Jones personally, unaware that the Temple was taping her conversation. President Carter also sent a representative to a dinner at the Temple at which Jones and then-Governor Jerry Brown spoke. Jones and Mrs. Carter dined again in March 1977 and exchanged letters afterward. In one of these letters, Jones requested aid for Cuba, having recently met dictator Fidel Castro.

In a handwritten reply to Jones on White House stationery, Carter wrote, "Your comments on Cuba have been helpful. I hope your suggestion can be acted on in the near future." Carter also wrote that, "I enjoyed being with you during the campaign -- and do hope you can meet Ruth soon."

However brief their encounters, the Temple did receive some limited praise from administration members. In 1976, Mondale stated regarding the Temple that "knowing the congregation's deep involvement in the major social and constitutional issues of our country ... is a great inspiration to me." Carter's Welfare Secretary, Joseph Califano, stated to Jones that "your humanitarian principles and your interest in protecting individual liberty and freedom have made an outstanding contribution to furthering the cause of human dignity."

== The San Francisco Housing Authority Commission ==
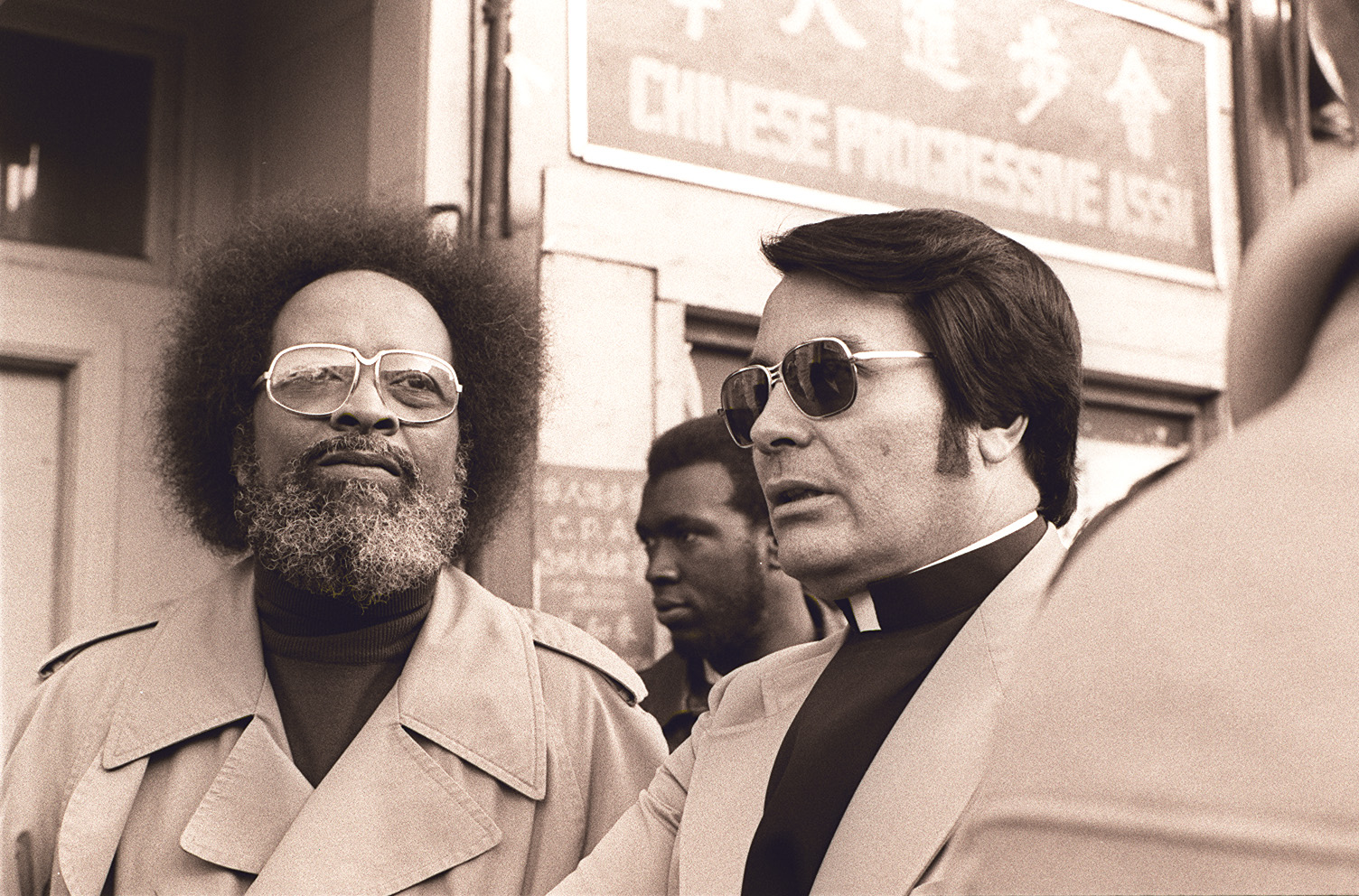
Rev. Cecil Williams and Rev. Jim Jones at a protest in front of the International Hotel in San Francisco, January 1977.

In March 1976, Mayor Moscone appointed Jones to the Human Rights Commission. Without telling his aides, just minutes before being sworn in, Jones declined the appointment, feeling it was a lateral move because he had served on a similar commission in Indiana in the 1960s. The aides of Moscone and Jones then scrambled to tell the media that Jones and Moscone were working on an alternative appointment.

Thereafter, Moscone appointed Jones as a member of the San Francisco Housing Authority Commission. After Jones' name appeared on the appointment list, the San Francisco Board of Supervisors requested that all potential appointees should receive background checks. Moscone then turned the matter over to a nominating committee that included Prokes and Goodlett. The committee approved Jones' appointment. When potential resistance arose to Jones' appointment, Willie Brown introduced legislation that would have stripped the Board of Supervisors of its power over the appointment. Wishing to maintain the status quo, the Board unanimously approved Jones' appointment.

After lobbying by Moscone's office, Jones was soon named Chairman of the commission. At the time, Moscone stated that Jones was a "peacemaker ... who had the ability to work with people." In July 1977, after media investigations into the Temple had begun, Moscone defended the appointment stating Jones was "both sensitive and realistic. From everything I've seen, he's been a good chairman."

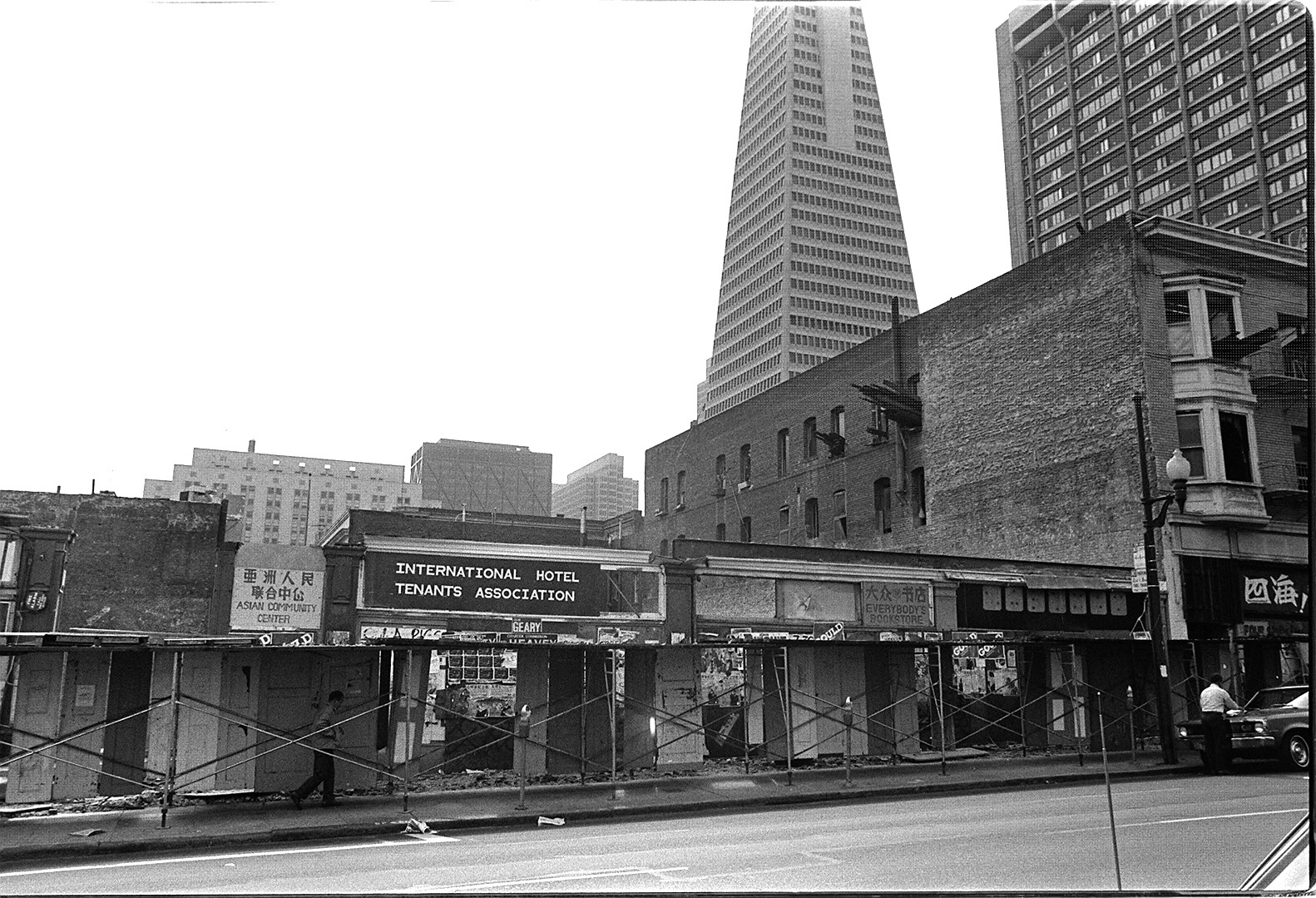
The International Hotel at 848 Kearny Street in San Francisco stood empty for years after the 1977 eviction.

Jones' most notable accomplishment on the commission was to lead the fight for a period against the eviction of impoverished residents at the International Hotel by the Four Seas Corporation. With Jones as chairman, the Housing Authority voted to acquire the building using $1.3 million in federal funds in order to transfer ownership to tenants rights groups.

When a federal court rejected the plan and ordered evictions in January 1977, the Temple provided 2,000 of the 5,000 people that surrounded the building, barricaded the doors and chanted, "No, no, no evictions!" Sheriff Hongisto, a political ally of Jones, refused to execute the eviction order, which resulted in him being held in contempt of court and serving five days in his own jail.

== Radicals ==
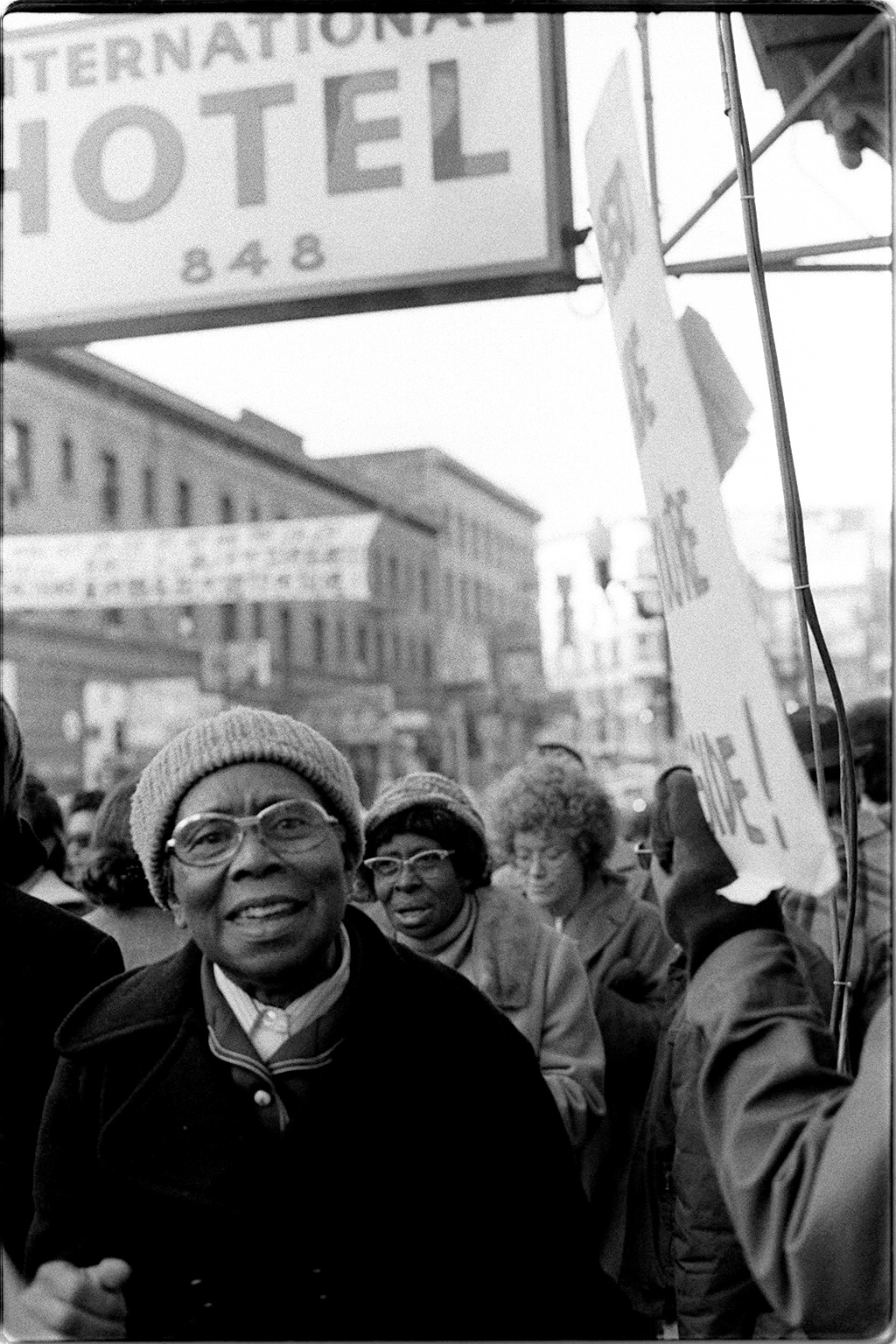
Members of Peoples Temple at 1977 rally in San Francisco's Chinatown.

=== Symbionese Liberation Army ===
Jones empathized with inner city frustrations that nourished Bay Area guerrilla vanguards such as the Black Panthers, the Black Liberation Army (BLA) and the Venceremos, which spawned the Symbionese Liberation Army (SLA). Jones expressed admiration for the SLA after its members kidnapped Patricia Hearst, and the Temple distributed the SLA's manifesto among its members. However, Jones attempted to convince law enforcement officials and the press that he opposed the SLA's violent actions by having members hand deliver a $2,000 check to the Hearst family mansion.

The police were not persuaded by Jones' efforts. Investigators interviewed a Temple member who admitted that, one year before the Hearst kidnapping, Jones stated that Randolph Hearst would be a target of guerilla action as he represented "capitalist society." A police report contained an analysis of press photos and determined that SLA leader Donald DeFreeze and SLA member Nancy Ling Perry attended various Temple meetings along with Hearst's boyfriend Stephen Weed.

After learning of police suspicions, Stoen wrote police in an attempt to dissuade them of the notion that Jones was involved with the SLA. Attempting to address police fears of Temple violence, Stoen's letters also claimed that Temple member Chris Lewis, who was involved in a BLA-related shooting, had agreed to leave San Francisco, though it did not mention that Lewis had been sent to Jonestown.

=== The Nation of Islam ===
Jones considered the Nation of Islam (NOI) to be racist and sexist, and feared that violence might flare up between the NOI and the Temple because of their close proximity in San Francisco's Western Addition. He inflamed tensions by claiming that the NOI was responsible for a fire at the Temple's San Francisco headquarters. After Temple member Al Mills was hassled for taking a photograph of NOI members, Jones sent burly African-American Temple security guards to a nearby NOI mosque to issue a warning.

However, relations later improved. To heal the rift, the two organizations held a historic "Spiritual Jubilee" in the Los Angeles Convention Center in 1976. Thousands packed the Civic Center, with the Temple members dressed in red and black intermixed with NOI members in white. Temple supporters Goodlett, Freitas, and Angela Davis traveled to the event, along with Lieutenant Governor Mervyn Dymally and Los Angeles Mayor Tom Bradley.

As Jones took the podium, imposing Temple "Red Brigade" security guards stood shoulder-to-shoulder with NOI security in a half moon formation in front of the stage. After calming the cheering crowd, Jones stated, "We are grateful for this symbolic merging of our two movements ... If the Peoples Temple and the Nation of Islam can get together, anyone can ... A few years ago, we couldn't even walk the streets because of tensions."

=== Angela Davis and the American Indian Movement ===
Davis was considered the Temple's favorite African American communist. Davis visited the Temple, and the Temple participated in rallies on her behalf. She frequently chatted with Jones and top Temple aides in Jones' San Francisco apartment. The relationship with Davis strengthened Jones' political credentials.

Jones cultivated an even closer relationship with American Indian Movement (AIM) co-founder Dennis Banks, who spoke at the Temple. The AIM received the Temple's largest donation, $19,500. The Temple also posted bail for Banks' wife, Ka-mook, from an Oregon jail. Banks' name would also later surface in the Temple's investigation of conspiracy theories concerning Al and Jeannie Mills.

== Defectors and conspiracies ==
=== Bob Houston and Joyce Shaw ===
Married Temple members Bob Houston and Joyce Shaw owned a house on Potrero Hill that was used as a Temple communal living facility. After Houston repeatedly questioned Jones about the details of socialist theory, Jones often branded Houston an "insensitive intellectual" and a "class enemy", and encouraged others to mock him. Houston became involved in at least two of the Temple's "boxing matches" where he was pummeled for punishment, suffering a bloody nose and being embarrassed in front of his family.

Meanwhile, Shaw suffered stress from running the commune and from coordinating medical care for all Temple members in San Francisco. Frustrated by the emotional abuse she endured within the Temple, Shaw defected in July 1976 while most Temple members were traveling on a cross country bus trip. Frightened of potential Temple search parties, Shaw lived on the Sonoma County Fairgrounds with a friend for three weeks before leaving for Ohio.

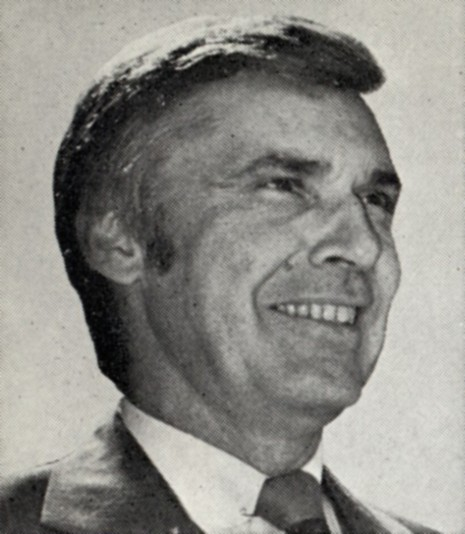
Congressman Leo Ryan

On October 2, 1976, Shaw called Houston on a line recorded by the Temple and invited him to leave, offering to rekindle their relationship. Three days later, Houston's dead body was found along the tracks at a Southern Pacific railroad yard. The Temple maintained that Houston coincidentally had resigned from the Temple on the morning of his death. Shaw saw the purported resignation letter, but believed it was forged because it was typewritten; Houston, she claimed, never typed his letters.

Temple members attended Houston's funeral, and Shaw held her purse in such a manner as to convince Temple members that the purse contained a tape recorder so that they would not bother her. The next day, when Shaw went to the Potrero Hill commune to pick up Houston's belongings, Temple member Carolyn Layton told Joyce she should not attempt to gain custody of his daughters, Judy and Patricia, because of documents the couple had been forced to sign claiming they had molested the girls. The Temple frequently required members to sign such documents.

Houston's father, Associated Press (AP) photographer Robert "Sammy" Houston, was convinced the Temple was involved in his son's death even though he was not yet aware of the taped telephone call of October 2. Sammy Houston conveyed the information to several AP reporters, including Tim Reiterman. Thereafter, letters from Judy and Patricia arrived at Sammy's house—from Jonestown. Sammy eventually communicated his story to a friend, Congressman Leo Ryan, stoking his interest in investigating the Temple. It would be Ryan's fact-finding mission to Jonestown in 1978 which led to the Temple's tragic demise.

=== The Stoens ===
In 1972, Timothy Stoen's wife Grace gave birth to a son named John. Two weeks later, Jones secretly had Tim sign a document claiming that he had urged Jones to engage in sexual relations with Grace, the result of which was the conception of John.

Grace grew to dislike the Temple after, among other things, they raised John "communally" and she witnessed the assault of Temple members. In July 1976, she fled to Lake Tahoe with another Temple member to avoid search parties. In her absence, the Temple moved John to Jonestown. Several months later, at the urging of Jones to avoid a possible custody-related investigation, Tim quit his job as assistant district attorney and also moved to Jonestown.

By June 1977, Tim's disaffection with the Temple grew to the point where he left the organization's headquarters in the Guyanese capital of Georgetown and returned to the U.S. to reunite with his wife. The Stoens' later opposition, including leadership in a group called the "Concerned Relatives", would become a significant reason for the investigation by Congressman Ryan's visit to Jonestown.

=== Unita Blackwell, the Mills and other conspiracies ===
The Temple frequently saw itself as the target of conspiracies by government agencies and others, and included these conspiracies in its literature.

In November 1976, Unita Blackwell, a Mississippi mayor and civil rights activist, spoke at the Geary Boulevard Temple about her trip to the People's Republic of China with actress Shirley MacLaine. Two men were caught eavesdropping at the front door and quickly fled in a rental car. The Temple traced the car's license plates to a government electronics expert. After a series of letters with Congressman Phillip Burton, the U.S. Air Force stated that the civilian was in their employ but that he was off the day of the Blackwell speech. This event was added to the growing list of alleged conspiratorial actions against the Temple.

The Temple also saw conspiracies and intrigue surrounding former Temple members Elmer and Deanna Mertle, who had fled the Temple and changed their names to Al and Jeannie Mills. Jones, who sometimes claimed he saw himself as the reincarnation of Vladimir Lenin, prophetically told Jeannie before the Mills' defection that, "Lenin died with a bullet in his body and so will I." As an offshoot of the Temple's "Diversions Committee", it formed a "Mertle Committee", which conducted activities such as breaking into the Mills' house to steal documents with the help of her daughter, still a Temple member. The Mills eventually began to host meetings with other Temple defectors, including the Stoens.

Meanwhile, the U.S. Customs Service had been investigating charges by over a dozen former Temple members that the group had illegally transported 170 guns to Jonestown in the false bottoms of crates. The Temple found out about the investigation when David Conn, a longtime friend of the Mills, tipped off Temple ally Dennis Banks by stating that Banks would be better off regarding an upcoming extradition matter if he denounced the Temple. Thereafter, the Mertle Committee conducted searches of Conn's garbage, broke into the crawl space under his house, and made an anonymous threatening phone call to Conn's wife. The Temple denounced the Conn and Banks meeting as a "blackmail attempt" in its literature.

The Temple also claimed that the U.S. Postal service was tampering with mail to the Geary Boulevard location, that "conspirators" were behind the death of alleged San Francisco Temple body guard Chris Lewis, and that "reactionary forces were trying to destroy his [Jones] image because he is the most persistent fighter for social justice."

== Political activities at the Temple ==
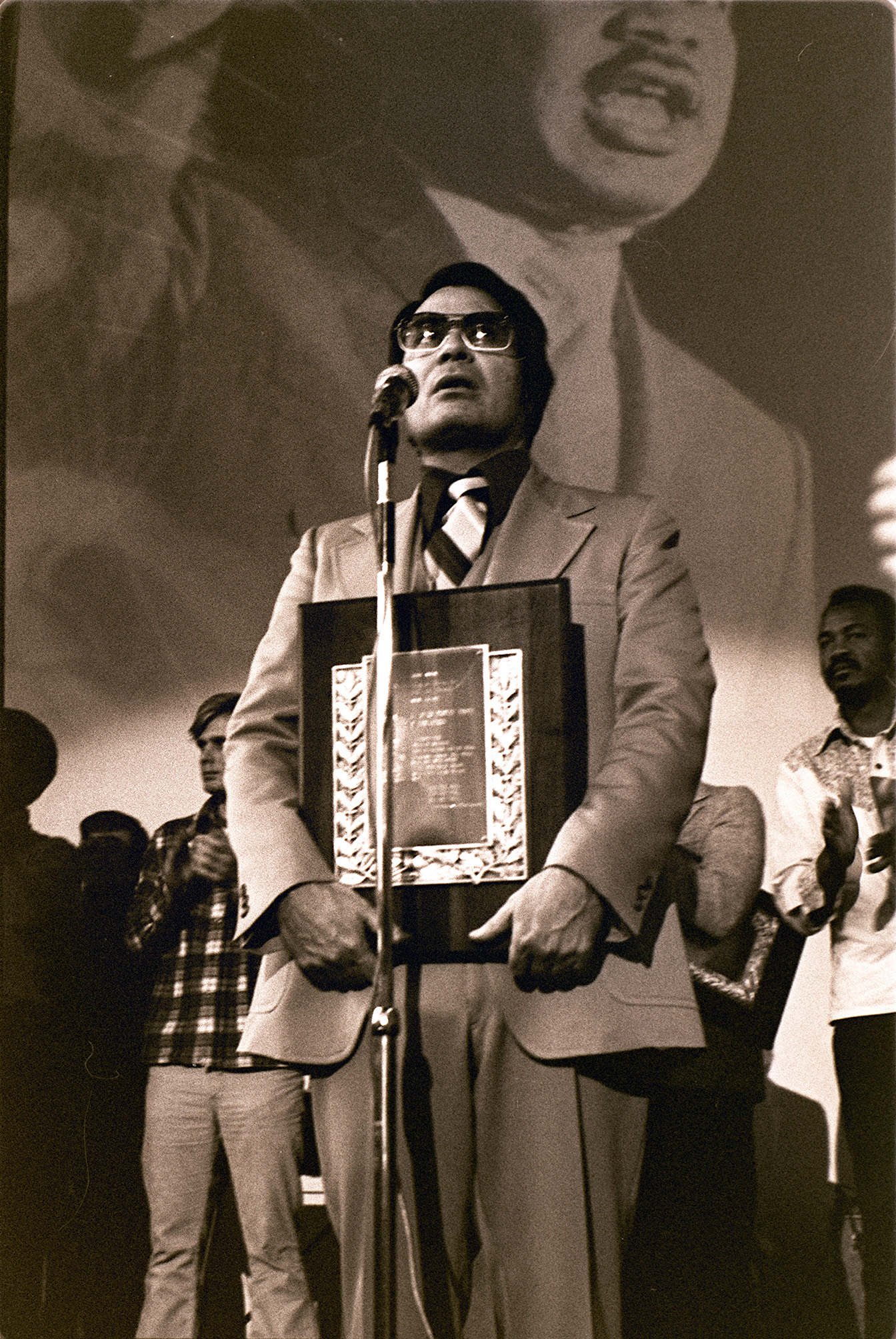
Rev. Jim Jones receives a Martin Luther King Jr. Humanitarian award at Glide Memorial Church in San Francisco, January 1977.

While the Temple aided some local politicians, it did not do so entirely without suspicion. Milk privately felt that Temple members were odd and dangerous. When a Milk aide became wary of the Temple's large and imposing security force following a delivery of election pamphlets, Milk cautioned the aide: "Make sure you're always nice to the Peoples Temple. If they ask you to do something, do it, and then send them a note thanking them for asking you to do it. They're weird and they're dangerous, and you never want to be on their bad side." Jim Rivaldo, a political consultant and associate of Milk, said that, after later meetings at the Temple, he and Milk agreed that "there was something creepy about it."

However, many politicians spoke at Geary Boulevard, including Milk and Governor Jerry Brown. By mid-1977, Willie Brown had visited the Temple perhaps a dozen times, some by invitation and some on his own. Preliminary consideration was even given by Brown's administration to a statewide post for Jones before his flight to Guyana.

Governor Brown, Willie Brown, Moscone, Dymally, Freitas, and Republican State Senator Milton Marks, were among the attendees of a large testimonial dinner in Jones' honor in September 1976. Willie Brown served as master of ceremonies and introduced Jones, stating, "Let me present to you what you should see every day when you look in the mirror in the early morning hours ... Let me present to you a combination of Martin Luther King Jr., Angela Davis, Albert Einstein ... Chairman Mao."

At another testimonial dinner, Brown introduced Jones, referring to him as "a young man came upon the scene, became an inspiration for a whole lot of people. He’s done fantastic things." Dymally stated that Jones was bringing together all ages and races and stated that "I am grateful he is showing an example not only in the U.S. but also in my former home territory, the Caribbean." At another testimonial dinner, when Jones garnered huge applause from the thousands attending, Moscone stated, "You know I’m smarter than to give a speech after listening to Reverend Jim Jones" and "there are two people I’m glad I’m not running against, Cecil Williams and Jim Jones".

Similarly, Milk was enthusiastically received at the Temple several times during his visits, and he always sent glowing notes of gratitude to Jones after visits. Milk ally Richard Boyle recalls "[b]oth Milk and I spoke at the temple to the cheers of thousands of Jones' followers and won their support." Following one visit, Milk wrote to Jones: "Rev Jim, It may take me many a day to come back down from the high that I reach today. I found something dear today. I found a sense of being that makes up for all the hours and energy placed in a fight. I found what you wanted me to find. I shall be back. For I can never leave."

Jim Rivaldo, who attended Temple meetings with Milk, explained that, until Jonestown, the church "was a community of people who appeared to be looking out for each other, improving their lives." Boyle explained that it was vital for both his campaign and Milk's that they be received well at the Temple "because Jones was not only Moscone's appointed head of the Housing Authority but also could turn out an army of volunteers."

In an interview of Jones by Willie Brown for a television show about the Temple, Brown stated, "You've managed to make the many peoples associated with the Peoples Temple a part of a family. If you're in need of health care, you get health care. If you're in need of legal assistance of some sort, you get that. If you're in need of transportation, you get that."

On another occasion, Brown stated, "San Francisco should have ten more Jim Joneses." Although Brown praised Jones, Jones in turn detested Brown for indulging in sports cars, clothes and women. During one of Brown's addresses at the Temple, Jones sat behind Brown and flipped his middle finger into the air.

While the Temple received political guests, Jones used his relationship with Moscone to intimidate potentially disagreeable Temple members. For example, former member Deborah Layton stated that her thoughts of running away were quashed by Jones' threats, including his statement: "Don't think you can get away with bad-mouthing this church. Mayor Moscone is my friend and he'll support my efforts to seek you out and destroy you."

== Media investigation and exodus ==
A New West Article Headline about the People's Temple.

In 1976, despite the Temple's newly acquired political might and upgraded image, high visibility had heightened Jones' fears of government crackdowns and media scrutiny. In April of that year, through harassment of newspaper personnel by way of numerous phone calls and letters, Jones was able to prevent Chronicle reporter Julie Smith from publishing an unfavorable story on the Temple. Fellow Chronicle reporter Marshall Kilduff wished to do a story on the Temple, but became reluctant after witnessing the Temple's treatment of Smith. Kilduff wondered how Jones had somehow learned the exact contents of Smith's article before it had come out.

When touring the Temple, Kilduff noticed, much to his surprise, that Chronicle city editor Steve Gavin and reporter Katy Butler were in attendance. The Temple's Peoples Forum newspaper chided Kilduff for not having a venue for his story and stated that he was "trying to convince different periodicals that a 'smear' of a liberal church that champions minorities and the poor would make 'good copy.'" Rather than dropping his story, Kilduff took it to New West magazine.

The Temple conducted another harassment campaign against New West, its advertisers, and owner Rupert Murdoch. The magazine received fifty calls and seventy letters a day before the article was even published. Concerned about the potential fallout from Kilduff's article, which included testimonies from Grace Stoen and Joyce Shaw, prompted Jones to decide on relocating the Temple to Jonestown. Jones convened with top aides for four days to formulate a plan for the exodus.

In its final form, Kilduff's article contained numerous allegations of fraud, assault and potential kidnapping. Just before its publication in July 1977, Moscone urged an ally who was the chairman of a department store chain to call friends at New West to inquire about the contents of the article. Jones fled to Guyana the night that the contents were read to him over the phone.

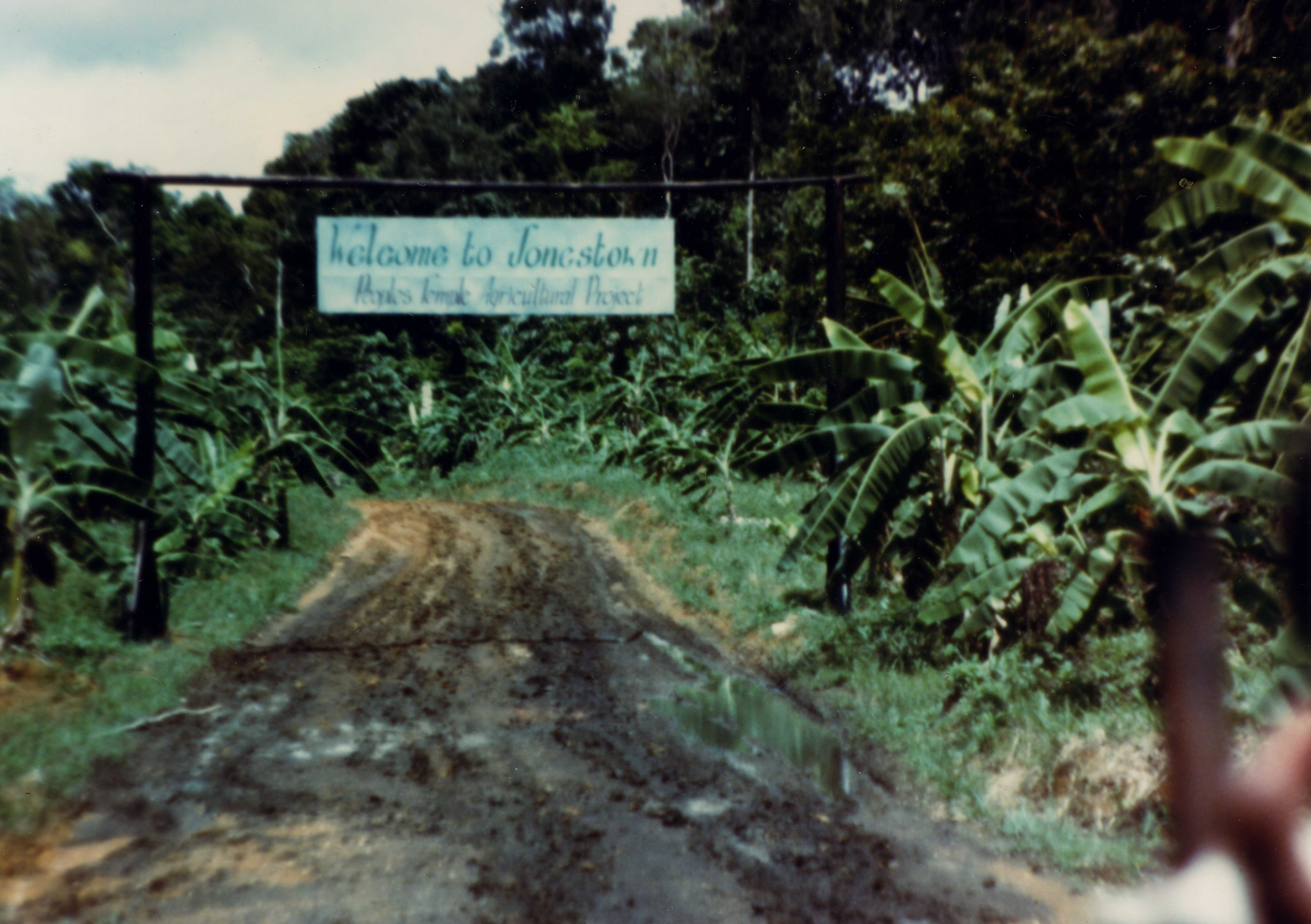
The entrance to Jonestown (photo:Jonestown Institute).

While Jones' exit was hasty, the exodus of most Temple members had been carefully prepared. The San Francisco field office of Immigration and Naturalization Service (INS) received hundreds of requests for passports in the weeks before the New West article was published.

After the New West article broke, San Francisco Supervisor Quentin Kopp immediately demanded that Moscone and Freitas launch an investigation into the Temple's activities. Moscone's office issued a press release stating, "The Mayor's Office does not and will not conduct any investigation" because the article was "a series of allegations with absolutely no hard evidence that the Rev. Jones has violated any laws, either local, state or federal."

After a six-week inquiry by the special unit, formerly headed by Timothy Stoen, into charges of battery, kidnapping, homicide, arson, extortion, and welfare fraud, District Attorney Freitas' office authored a report stating that the investigation turned up "no evidence of criminal wrongdoing", though it stated that the Temple's practices were at best "unsavory". Freitas did not publicly disclose either the investigation or the report.

Following the publication of media reports alleging criminal wrongdoing, Guyanese Minister of State Kit Nasciemento contacted Freitas and was told that the case against Jones was closed. It was not until after the tragedy at Jonestown that Freitas disclosed the investigation of the Temple.

== After Jones' move to Guyana ==
=== A temple without a leader ===
As the time after Jones' departure proceeded, the zealotry of the San Francisco staff turned to martyrdom. Friday and Sunday meetings were still held, but attendance dropped. With donations in decline, the Temple began to sell off its property. With shrinking personnel, the staff that remained became overworked. While the Geary Boulevard facility eventually became little more than a supply depot for Jonestown, the Temple insisted in a press release that "we are not moving out of San Francisco or California", denouncing news reports of a permanent exodus as "biased and sensationalistic reporting."

San Francisco media, such as the San Francisco Examiner, monitored communications that Jones made from Jonestown back to Geary Boulevard via shortwave radio. Much of them contained mundane requests interspersed with Jones' usual propaganda. Many in the San Francisco Temple feared that the Federal Communications Commission (FCC) would revoke the Temple's radio license, cutting its lifeline to Jonestown.

Complicating matters Jones made impossible demands, including writing 1,500 letters to the FCC and 1,500 to the Internal Revenue Service. Any members that were seen as wavering were sent to Jonestown. Meanwhile, former Bay Area Temple allies, such as Angela Davis and Huey Newton, broadcast live radio messages to the inhabitants of Jonestown during Jones' fiery "White Night" rallies, telling Temple members to hold strong against the "conspiracy."

The Temple hired Charles R. Garry to represent it in numerous lawsuits and to draft Freedom of Information Act requests. The Temple also hired noted JFK assassination conspiracy theorist Mark Lane, who gave press conferences at the Geary Boulevard facility.

In October 1978, a crippling blow occurred when San Francisco Temple leader Terry Buford defected, though she wrote a series of notes falsely claiming that she was going under cover as a "double agent" to infiltrate "Timothy Stoen's group." Buford had secretly gone to stay with Lane, whom she had met during interactions at Geary Boulevard.

=== Waning political clout ===
While most influential allies broke ties with the Temple following Jones' departure, some did not. Willie Brown stated that the attacks were "a measure of the church’s effectiveness", while Herb Caen wrote a column in the Chronicle questioning the validity of the New West article. The Sun Reporter also defended the Temple.

On July 31, 1977, just after Jones had fled to Guyana, the Temple conducted a rally against political opponents attended by Brown, Milk and Agnos, among others. At that rally, Brown stated, "When somebody like Jim Jones comes on the scene … and constantly stresses the need for freedom of speech and equal justice under law for all people, that absolutely scares the hell out of most everybody … I will be here when you are under attack, because what you are about is what the whole system ought to be about!" Brown also stated of Jones at the rally that "[h]e is a rare human being" and "he cares about people … Rev. Jim Jones is that person who can be helpful when all appears to be lost and hope is just about gone."

While Moscone refused a request to launch his own inquiry, he was deeply disturbed by the allegations against the Temple, though he thought Jones would return from Guyana. However, on August 2, 1977, Jones dictated his resignation from Guyana via radio-telephone.

Milk remained popular among Temple members. Two months before the Jonestown tragedy, Temple members sent over fifty letters of sympathy to Milk following the death of his lover, Jack Lira. The letters were formulaic and one typical letter ended, "You have our deepest sympathy in your loss and we would be glad to have you with us [in Jonestown], even for only a short visit."

Temple member Sharon Amos wrote, "I had the opportunity in San Francisco when we were there to get to know you and thought very highly of your commitment to social actions and the betterment of your community." She also wrote, "I hope you will be able to visit us here sometime in Jonestown. Believe it or not, it is a tremendously sophisticated community, though it is in a jungle." (Note: Amos later murdered her children with a knife at the behest of Jones in Georgetown, Guyana, and subsequently committed suicide. (Tim Reiterman (1982) "Raven: The Untold Story of Rev. Jim Jones and His People" ISBN 978-0-525-24136-2 pp. 544–545))

Milk spoke at a service at the Temple for the last time in October 1978. After Congressman Ryan announced that he would investigate Jonestown following the 1978 midterm elections, Brown was still planning a fund raising dinner for the Temple that was to be held on December 2.

=== San Francisco media and the Concerned Relatives ===
In San Francisco, Jones suffered further damage from unfavorable media articles during his absence. Especially damaging was a February 18, 1978 article in the Examiner, following a telephone interview with Jones, which detailed the custody fight over John Stoen and pressure for a congressional investigation of Jonestown spearheaded by John's father Tim, the leader of the Concerned Relatives. The repercussions of the article were devastating for the Temple's reputation, and made most former supporters even more suspicious of the group's claim that they were being subjected to a "rightist vendetta." The Examiner article also drew the interest of Congressman Ryan, who had weeks earlier been lobbied by Timothy Stoen and wrote a letter on his behalf.

The next day, on February 19, Milk wrote a letter to President Carter supporting Jones and made statements about the Stoens. Milk wrote that "Rev. Jones is widely known in the minority communities and elsewhere as a man of the highest character." Regarding Timothy Stoen, Milk wrote that "[i]t is outrageous that Timothy Stoen could even think of flaunting this situation in front of Congressman with apparent bold-faced lies." The letter ended with, "Mr. President, the actions of Mr. Stoen need to be brought to a halt. It is offensive to most in the San Francisco community and all those who know Rev. Jones to see this kind of outrage taking place." (Note: At Jonestown, John Stoen was found poisoned in Jim Jones' cabin. (Reiterman, Tim, and John Jacobs. Raven: The Untold Story of Rev. Jim Jones and His People. Dutton, 1982. ISBN 978-0-525-24136-2))

Jones also told the San Francisco Temple staff to prepare for a media blast. In order to attempt to combat the damage, the Temple sent to various newspapers a document signed by Stoen claiming that Jones was the father of the child in the custody dispute after he had allegedly directed Jones to engage in sexual relations with Grace. Caen reprinted the document in his Chronicle column.

== After the mass murder-suicide ==
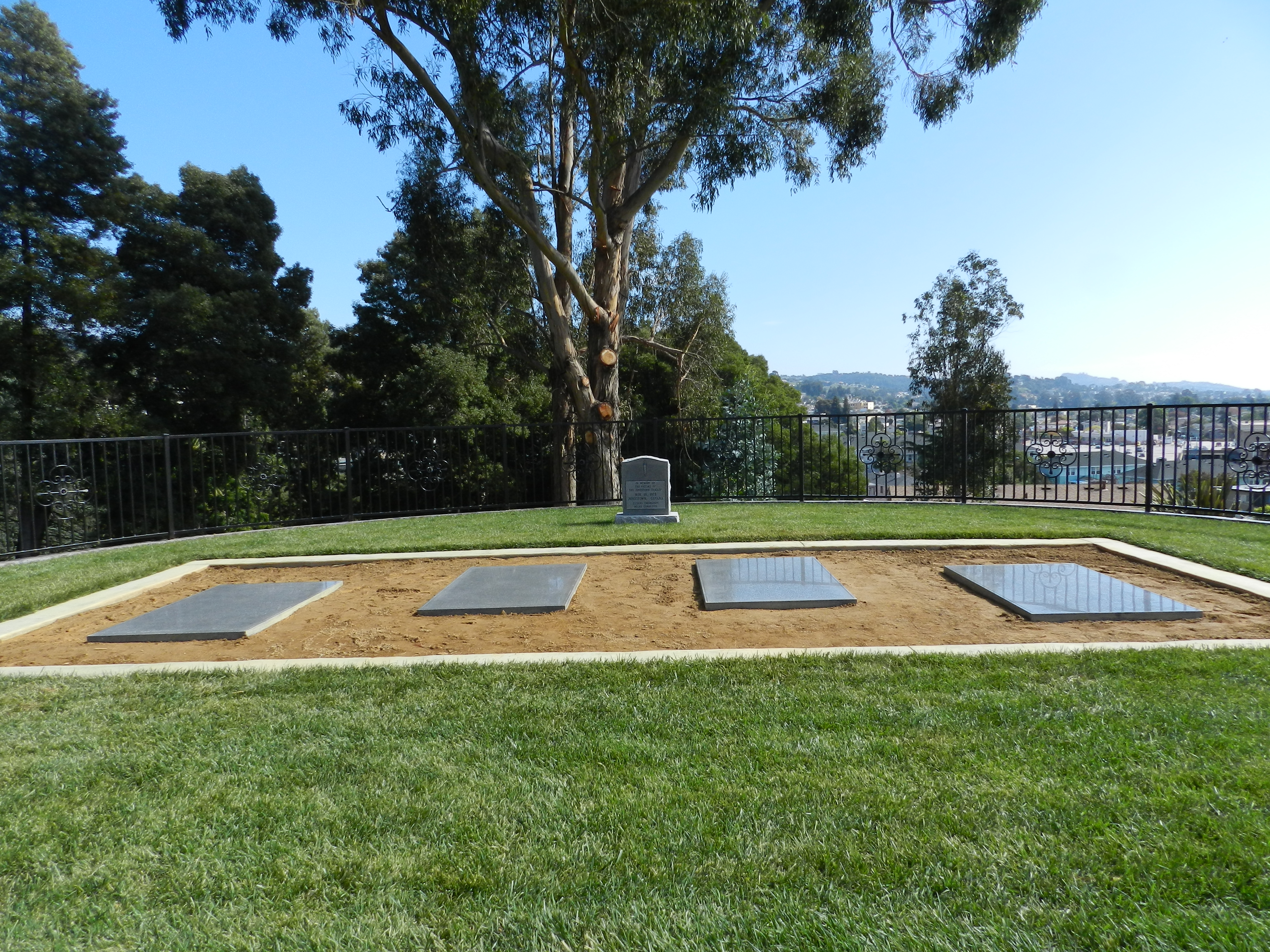
Memorial gravesite, Evergreen Cemetery, Oakland.

On the evening of November 18, 1978 in Jonestown, Jones ordered his congregation to drink cyanide-laced Flavor Aid. In all, at Jonestown, at a nearby airstrip in Port Kaituma, and in Georgetown, 918 people died, including over 270 children, resulting in the greatest single loss of American civilian life in a non-natural disaster until the September 11 attacks. Congressman Ryan was among those killed at the airstrip.

Judy and Patty Houston, the girls about whom Carolyn Layton threatened Joyce Houston not to move for custody at the Sutter Street commune, were also found poisoned. Timothy Stoen's son John was found poisoned in Jim Jones's cabin. Sharon Amos, who had earlier led political pamphletting campaigns in San Francisco, murdered her children with a knife and committed suicide at the Temple's Georgetown headquarters (150 miles from Jonestown) at the behest of Jones.

412 unclaimed victims are buried at Evergreen Cemetery, in Oakland, as many of the local members of the church had come from Oakland. A memorial plaque with the names of all victims was placed at the site in 2011, which controversially included the name of Jones, who is not buried at the cemetery.

=== Temple and law enforcement ===
Paralyzing fear initially gripped the Temple's enemies as press reports of Temple "hit squads" surfaced immediately after the tragedy. Public officials, reporters and former members were all among groups reportedly targeted by such squads. San Francisco officials, law enforcement and mental health professionals took steps to avert the spread of violence.

Ex-members immediately traveled to the Human Freedom Center in Berkeley to gather under police protection and await word of the list of survivors. On the afternoon of the attack at the Port Kaituma airstrip, before the news became public, the wife of Ryan aide William Holsinger received three threatening phonecalls at the couple's San Francisco home. The caller allegedly stated, "Tell your husband that his meal ticket just had his brains blown out, and he better be careful."

After Holsinger's family was initially evacuated to Palo Alto under police protection, the Holsingers then fled to Lake Tahoe and later to a ranch in Houston, Texas. They never returned to their home in San Francisco. None of the reported hit squads ever materialized.

After years of Jones' statements about ominous forces aligning against the Temple, members at the Geary Boulevard facility expected an immediate attack by government troops. They were so afraid of a "McCarthy era" backlash that they smuggled documents and records past police cars stationed outside the building and burned them in a massive bonfire on the beach.

Meanwhile, the Geary Boulevard building itself was besieged by national media and victims' relatives. The Temple was labeled "Cult of Death" in many sources, including the covers of Time and Newsweek magazines. Relatives of victims camped outside the Temple's chained fences for days, screaming at members through the fence. Inside, Temple loyalists were as emotionally hurt as others—perhaps 100 to 200 would have themselves taken the poison had they been in Jonestown that day. They woke up not only without friends and relatives, but also without the figure at the center of their political and religious worldview.

State and local law enforcement and prosecutors finally investigated the Temple. While they felt that health and welfare officials did not properly investigate complaints against the organization, they found no criminal wrongdoing by Timothy Stoen or other former members.

Eleven years after the mass suicide at Jonestown, the building on Geary Boulevard sustained structural damage in the Loma Prieta earthquake. Since the owner was unwilling to reinforce the structure, the building was demolished, and the property remained undeveloped until a Post Office branch opened at the site in the late 1990s.

=== Michael Prokes ===
Michael Prokes, who directed the Temple's relations with several San Francisco politicians and media, survived when he was ordered to deliver a suitcase containing Temple funds to be transferred to the Communist Party of the Soviet Union. He committed suicide in March 1979 at a press conference in Modesto. In the days leading up to his death, Prokes sent notes to several people, together with a thirty-page statement he had written about the Temple. Caen reprinted one copy in his Chronicle column.

=== Influential allies' reactions ===
After the tragedy, Mayor Moscone initially defended his appointment of Jones, stating that his reputation in 1975 was that of a man who believed in social justice and racial equality, and that there was evidence that the Temple had initiated programs for drug and alcohol rehabilitation. When asked by a reporter whether he felt in any way culpable for the events, Moscone became angry and stated, "I'm not taking any responsibility, it's not mine to shoulder." Milk stated that, "Guyana was a great experiment that didn't work. I don't know, maybe it did."

Because Milk and Moscone were both killed by Dan White nine days after the Jonestown tragedy and rumors persisted of purported Temple hit squads seeking to assassinate political figures, many in San Francisco initially believed that their murders were connected to the Temple. No evidence exists that White acted at the behest of Jones or the Temple.

Unlike most other politicians, Willie Brown continued to praise Jones, feeling that attacks on Jones were effectively attacks on the black community. Brown initially stated he had "no regrets" over his past association with the Temple and that he would not dissociate himself from it like other politicians. "They all like to say, 'Forgive me, I was wrong', but that's bullshit. It doesn't mean a thing now, it just isn't relevant." Brown stated that his decision to speak at the Temple was "not a faulty decision at the time it was made, based on all the object factors at that time." Brown later said, "If we knew then he was mad, clearly we wouldn't have appeared with him."

Of his relationship with Jones, Goodlett said in a 1997 interview: "You don't need glasses for hindsight. Everybody is running like hell away from Jim Jones now, but none of us knew at the time."

Civil rights activist Rev. Jesse Jackson, who had met with Jones on several occasions, refused to disparage him, stating that he still considered Jones to be a man that "worked for the people." Jackson also stated, "I would hope that all of the good he did will not be discounted because of this tremendous tragedy." Jackson praised Moscone for "not going on a diatribe against the Peoples Temple" and "blowing the whole thing out of proportion."
