= Raven (Reiterman book) =

1982 non-fiction book about Jim Jones and the Peoples Temple

- Front cover
- Author: Tim Reiterman with John Jacobs
- Language: English
- Subject: Destructive cults Murder–suicide
- Genre: Nonfiction
- Publisher: E. P. Dutton
- Publication date: October 1, 1982
- Publication place: United States
- Media type: Hardback (first ed.)
- Pages: 622
- ISBN: 0525241361
- OCLC: 7837655
- Dewey Decimal: 289.9 19
- LC Class: BP605.P46 R44 1982

Raven: The Untold Story of the Rev. Jim Jones and His People details the life and ultimate demise of Jim Jones and the Peoples Temple. Written by journalist Tim Reiterman, the book reviews the history of the Peoples Temple. The book includes numerous interviews, audio tapes and documents among its hundreds of sources.

== Background ==
In addition to covering the Jim Jones and the Peoples Temple in articles in the San Francisco Examiner, Reiterman also accompanied Representative Leo Ryan on his November 1978 investigative trip to Jonestown. Reiterman was shot when the Peoples Temple attacked Ryan's delegation at an airstrip in Guyana, but he survived.

== Research ==
During the course of his research for the book, Reiterman traveled to Indiana and visited locations where Jim Jones grew up and conducted interviews with local residents who knew him.

== Contents ==
The book describes the events that occurred in Jonestown, Guyana, where over 900 people lost their lives as the result of mass forced suicide, which constituted the largest loss of American civilian life (other than due to natural disasters or during the course of violence with Native Americans) in United States history until the events of September 11, 2001. The book further describes the investigation and death of Representative Ryan.

== Reception ==
In 1983, Raven was recognized with the Thomas Thompson PEN Award for nonfiction. Marshall Kilduff of the San Francisco Chronicle wrote highly of the book and recommended it in a 2007 summer reading list: "This stands as the definitive history of Jim Jones and his bizarre Peoples Temple." Rob Morse of the San Francisco Examiner wrote: "The book is so definitive, it's tough going. It has no cheap thrills, just depressing shivers." In a review for the Associated Press, Lisa Levitt Ryckman called the book "the most comprehensive of the dozen written since Jones directed his followers in an orgy of suicide and murder", and in a subsequent article about Jonestown reiterated her position, and referred to the book as the "definitive book on Jones and Peoples Temple".

The book received a positive review in Library Journal, and reviewer Barbara Conaty wrote: "This compelling, brutally convincing account is unlikely to be surpassed." Barbara Bright of The New York Times Book Review described the book as a "powerfully written and well-researched book, documenting a peculiarly American tragedy". A review in Choice: Current Reviews for Academic Libraries called the book "Good supplementary reading for a number of college courses, and valuable for general adult reading, it is strongly recommended for all libraries," and commented "Reiterman's methods and sources are sufficiently described to certify Raven as a serious work." Herbert A. Michelson of The Sacramento Bee described Raven as : "a critically acclaimed study of the Peoples Temple".

Bob MacDonald of The Boston Globe characterized the book as an "excellent inquiry" into the deaths at Jonestown. In a review in National Review, David Evanier wrote: "Raven does not explain Jones ... But through its accumulation of excellent details, he is understood by the book's end, without apology, exaggeration, superfluous information, or psychoanalysis." Jordan Robertson of the Associated Press called Raven the "seminal book on the Peoples Temple". Writing for the San Francisco Chronicle, Michael Taylor characterized the work as an "exhaustive study", and Stephen G. Bloom of the Sacramento Bee called it "an exhaustive biography of Jim Jones".

Raven has been used as a reference in other books discussing the events surrounding Jonestown and Peoples Temple. Henry Warner Bowden used the book as a reference in the entry on Jim Jones in Dictionary of American Religious Biography. Harold G. Barrett utilized Raven as a reference in his book Rhetoric and Civility, and described it as "a thorough, highly detailed and documented account". Eugene V. Gallagher and W. Michael Ashcraft referenced the book in their work Introduction to New and Alternative Religions in America, where they referred to it as "an engaging journalistic account".

== Planned adaptation ==
In 2016, it was announced that Vince Gilligan of Breaking Bad and The X-Files would be developing an HBO limited miniseries based on Raven, about Jones and the 1978 Jonestown tragedy. It would have been co-produced by Octavia Spencer and Gilligan's longtime collaborator Michelle MacLaren. However, in 2018, Gilligan said that he had slowed down on developing the project.
