= Harold G. Barrett =

American writer and rhetorician

Harold G. Barrett is an American Emeritus Professor of Speech Communication at California State University, East Bay. He is also a writer rhetorician on the subject of ethics and civility in communication.

== Early life an education ==
Barrett earned an A.B., 1949, and an M.A., 1952, from the University of the Pacific. He graduated with a Ph.D. in 1962 from the University of Oregon.

== Career ==
During his career Barrett published a number of books. One of his better known works, Rhetoric and Civility Human Development, Narcissism, and the Good Audience, was published in 1991. In this book Barrett discusses classical rhetorical theory and interprets it for use in all interactions, exploring origins in infancy of the rhetorical disposition and the rhetorical indisposition. Barrett provides four case-study chapters of the lives of individuals illustrating unhealthy narcissism and rhetorical failure, and illustrates how unfavorable narcissism can give adverse direction to the rhetorical imperative and lead to problems in relationships. Barrett offers a rhetorical corrective.

Barrett also published a number of journal articles on various subjects related to rhetoric and effectiveness in verbal communication, both currently and in historical context.

For many years Barrett was the coordinator of California State University's Conference in Rhetorical Criticism.

== Selected publications ==
- Maintaining the Self in Communication
- Rhetoric of the People: Is There Any Better Or Equal Hope in the World? (editor)
- Harold Barrett (22 January 1991). Rhetoric and Civility: Human Development, Narcissism, and the Good Audience. SUNY Press. ISBN 978-0-7914-0484-3.
- Harold Barrett (1987). The Sophists: Rhetoric, Democracy, and Plato's Idea of Sophistry. Chandler & Sharp. ISBN 978-0-88316-557-7.
- Harold Barrett (1 January 1987). Practical uses of speech communication. Holt, Rinehart, and Winston.
