= History of religion in the United States =

Religion in North America began with the religions and spiritual practices of Native Americans. Later, religion also played a role in the founding of some colonies, as many colonists, such as the Puritans, came to escape religious persecution. Historians debate how much influence religion, specifically Christianity and more specifically Protestantism, had on the American Revolution. Many of the Founding Fathers were active in a local Protestant church; some of them had deist sentiments, such as Thomas Jefferson, Benjamin Franklin, and George Washington. Some researchers and authors have referred to the United States as a "Protestant nation" or "founded on Protestant principles," specifically emphasizing its Calvinist heritage. Others stress the secular character of the American Revolution and note the secular character of the nation's founding documents.

Protestantism in the United States, as the largest and dominant form of religion in the country, has been profoundly influential to the history and culture of the United States. African Americans were very active in forming their own Protestant churches, most of them Baptist or Methodist, and giving their ministers both moral and political leadership roles. The group often known as "White Anglo-Saxon Protestants" have dominated American society, culture, and politics for most of the history of the United States, while the so-called "Protestant work ethic" has long held influence over American society, politics, and work culture. In the late 19th and early 20th century, most major American Protestant denominations started overseas missionary activity. The "Mainline Protestant" denominations promoted the "Social Gospel" in the early 20th century, calling on Americans to reform their society; the demand for prohibition of liquor was especially strong. After 1970, the mainline Protestant denominations (such as Methodists, Presbyterians and Episcopalians) lost membership and influence. The more conservative Protestant evangelical, fundamentalist, and charismatic denominations (such as the Southern Baptists) grew rapidly until the 1990s and helped form the Religious Right in politics.

Though Protestantism has always been the predominant and majority form of Christianity in the United States, the nation has had a small but significant Catholic population from its founding, and as the United States expanded into areas of North America that had been part of the Catholic Spanish and French empires, that population increased. Later, immigration waves in the mid to late 19th and 20th century brought immigrants from Catholic countries, further increasing Catholic diversity and augmenting the number of Catholics substantially while also fomenting an increase in virulent American anti-Catholicism. At the same time, these immigration waves also brought a great number of Jewish and Eastern Orthodox immigrants to the United States. Protestantism in general (i.e. all of the Protestant denominations combined) remains by far the predominant and largest form of religion and the dominant and predominant form of Christianity in the United States, though the Catholic Church is technically the largest individual religious denomination in the United States if Protestantism is divided into its various denominations instead of being counted as a single religious grouping. Overall, roughly 43% of Americans identify as Protestants, with 20% identifying as Catholics, 4% identifying with various other Christian groups such as Mormonism, Eastern Orthodox Christianity and Oriental Orthodox Christianity, and Jehovah's Witnesses; and 2% identifying as Jewish. Hindus, Buddhists, and Muslims account for 1% each of the population.

As Western Europe secularized in the late 20th century, the United States largely resisted the trend, so that, by the 21st century, the US was one of the most strongly Christian of all major Western nations. Religiously-based moral positions on issues such as abortion and homosexuality played a hotly debated role in American politics. However, the United States has dramatically and rapidly secularized in recent years, with around 26% of the population currently declaring themselves "unaffiliated", either in regard to a religion in general or to an organized religion.

== Demographics ==
Religion in the United States (2019)
1. Protestantism (43.0%)
2. Catholicism (20.0%)
3. Mormonism (2.00%)
4. Unaffiliated (26.0%)
5. Judaism (2.00%)
6. Islam (1.00%)
7. Hinduism (1.00%)
8. Buddhism (1.00%)
9. Other religions (3.00%)
10. Unanswered (2.00%)

The US census has never asked Americans directly about their religion or religious beliefs, but it did compile statistics from each denomination starting in 1945.

Finke and Stark conducted a statistical analysis of the official census data after 1850, and Atlas for 1776, to estimate the number of Americans who were adherents to a specific denomination. In 1776, their estimate is 17%. In the late 19th century, 1850–1890, the rate increased from 34% to 45%. From 1890 –1952, the rate grew from 45% to 59%.

=== Pew Forum data ===
According to the Pew Research Center the percentage of Protestants in the United States has decreased from over two-thirds in 1948 to less than half by 2012 with 48% of Americans identifying as Protestant. In a 2023-24 Religious Landscape Study conducted by Pew Research Center, it was found that 62% of American adults described themselves as Christian, which was down from 78% of American adults describing themselves as Christian in a 2007 study.

=== Gallup data ===
The data here comes from Gallup, which has polled Americans annually about their denominational preferences since 1948. Gallup did not ask whether a person was a formal member of the denomination. Blank means that there is no data available for a given year. All of the percentages here are rounded to the nearest percent, so 0% could mean any percentage less than 0.5%.

View source data.

This decline in Protestant immigration has corresponded to the relaxation of immigration restrictions pertaining to mostly non-Protestant countries. The percentage of Catholics in the United States increased from 1948 all the way to the 1980s, but then began declining again. The percentage of Jews in the United States has decreased from 4% to 2% during this same time period. There has been very little Jewish immigration to the US after 1948 in comparison to previous years. The number of people with other religions was almost nonexistent in 1948, but rose to 5% by 2011, partially due to large immigration from non-Christian countries. The percentage of non-religious people (atheists, agnostics, and irreligious people) in the US has dramatically increased from 2% to 13%. The number of Americans unsure about their religion and religious beliefs has stayed roughly the same over the years, always hovering at 0% to 4%.

Percentage of Americans by Protestant religious affiliation (1992–2011)
Religion	1992	1995	2000	2005	2010	2011
Southern Baptist	9%	10%	8%	5%	4%	4%
Other Baptist	10%	9%	10%	11%	13%	9%
Methodist	10%	9%	9%	8%	7%	5%
Presbyterian	5%	4%	5%	3%	3%	2%
Episcopalian	2%	2%	3%	3%	2%	1%
Lutheran	7%	6%	7%	5%	5%	5%
Pentecostal	1%	3%	2%	2%	2%	2%
Church of Christ		2%	2%	2%	1%	2%
Other Protestant	11%	9%	4%	5%	4%	5%
Non-denominational Protestant	1%	3%	4%	5%	5%	4%
No opinion	5%	1%	2%	1%	2%	1%

Over the last 19 years, some of the more traditional Protestant denominations and branches experienced a large decline as a percentage of the total American population. These include Southern Baptists, Methodists, Presbyterians, Episcopalians, and other Protestants. The only Protestant category that significantly increased its percentage share over the last 19 years is non-denominational Protestantism.

== Before European colonization ==
=== Native Americans ===
Native American religions are the spiritual practices of the Indigenous peoples of the Americas. Traditional Native American ceremonial ways can vary widely, and are based on the differing histories and beliefs of individual tribes, clans and bands. Early European explorers describe individual Native American tribes and even small bands as each having their own religious practices. Theology may be monotheistic, polytheistic, henotheistic, animistic, or some combination thereof. Traditional beliefs are usually passed down in the forms of oral histories, stories, allegories and principles, and rely on face to face teaching in one's family and community.

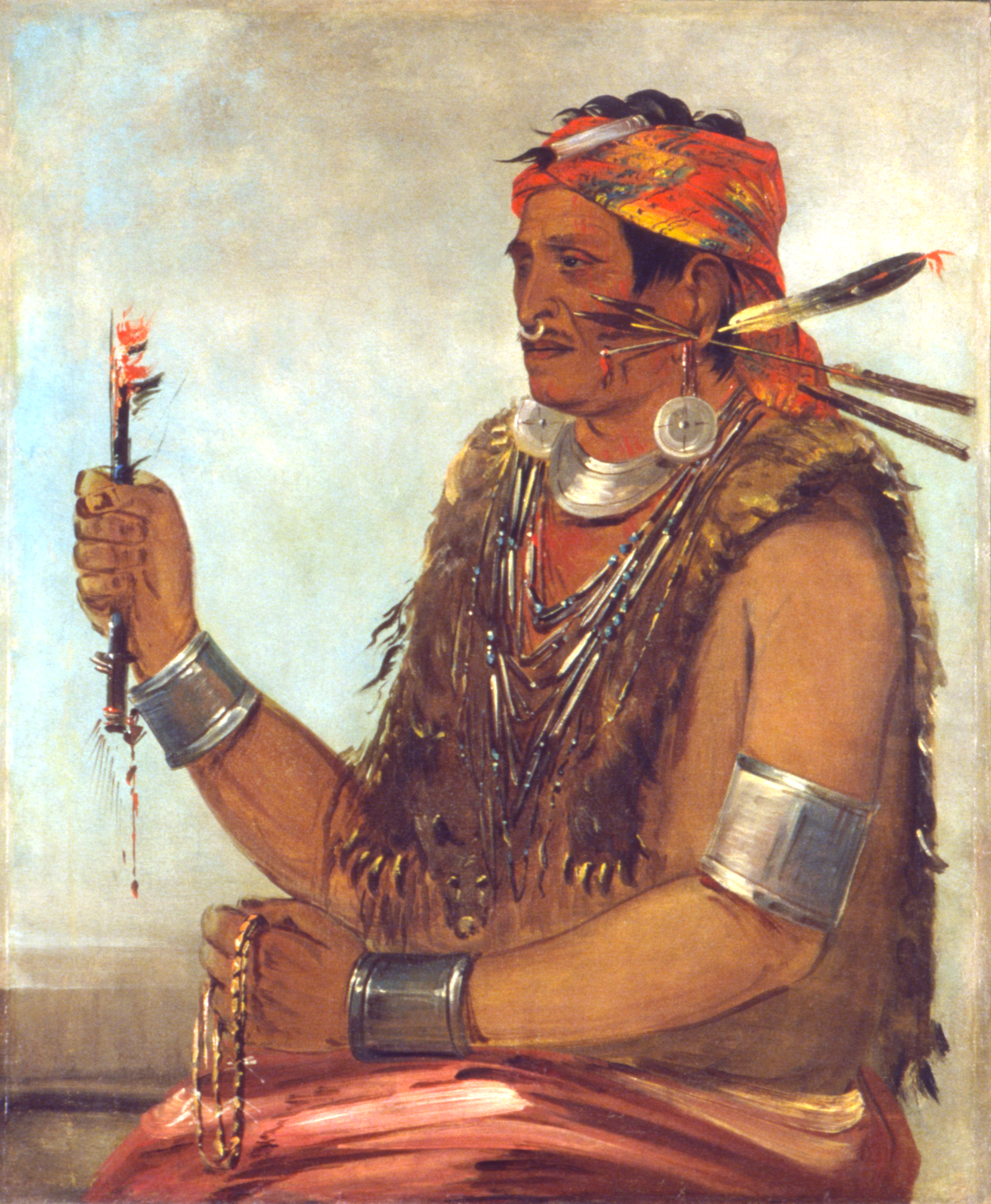
Tenskwatawa, by George Catlin.

From time to time important religious leaders organized revivals. In Indiana in 1805, Tenskwatawa (called the Shanee Prophet by Americans) led a religious revival following a smallpox epidemic and a series of witch-hunts. His beliefs were based on the earlier teachings of the Lenape prophets, Scattamek and Neolin, who predicted a coming apocalypse that would destroy the European-American settlers. Tenskwatawa urged the tribes to reject the ways of the Americans: to give up firearms, liquor, and American-style clothing, to pay traders only half the value of their debts, and to refrain from ceding any more lands to the United States. The revival led to warfare led by his brother Tecumseh against the white settlers.

Native Americans were the target of extensive Christian missionary activity. Catholics launched Jesuit Missions amongst the Huron and the Spanish missions in California) and various Protestant denominations. Numerous Protestant denominations were active. By the late 19th century, most Native Americans integrated into American society generally have become Christians, along with a large portion of those living on reservations. The Navajo, the largest and most isolated tribe, resisted missionary overtures until Pentecostal revivalism attracted their support after 1950.

== Before the American Revolution ==
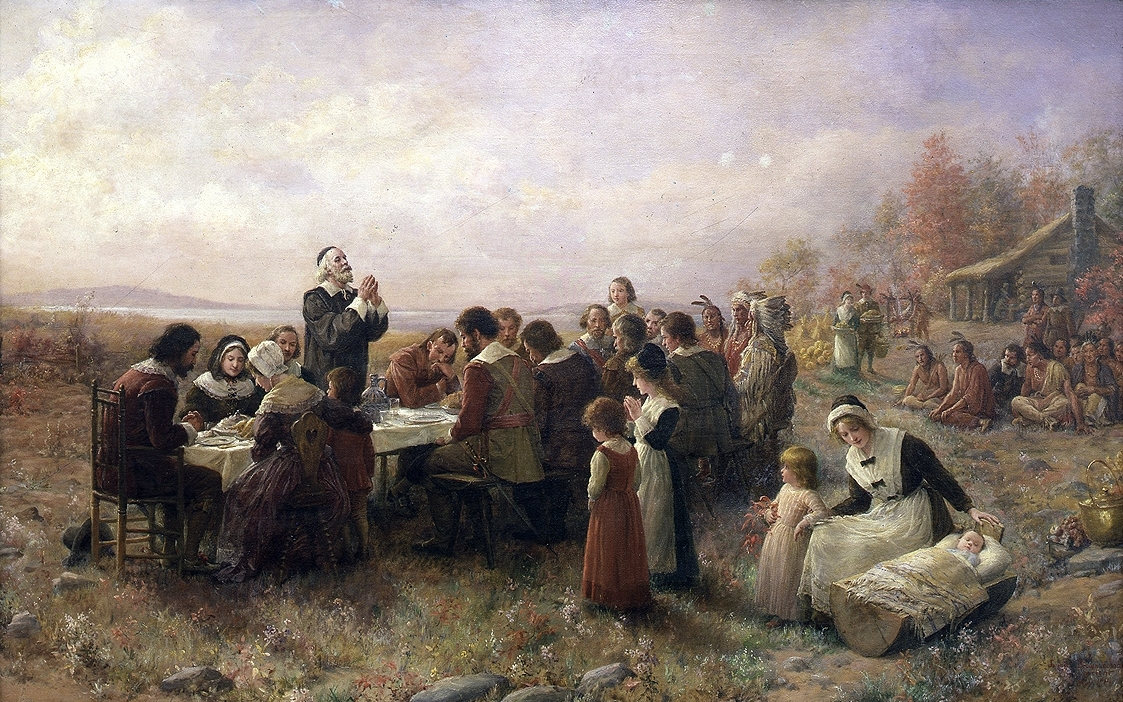
The First Thanksgiving at Plymouth by Jennie Augusta Brownscombe (1914)

Religion in the Thirteen Colonies played a central role in the social and political life of early America. The diversity of religious arrangements in the colonies shaped debates over liberty of conscience and influenced the development of the principle of separation of church and state after independence.

The colonies displayed a wide variety of religious practices. In most of New England there were established Congregational churches dating from the early Puritan migration that set the tone for the colonies. There were established Anglican churches in the Southern colonies such as Virginia, the Carolinas, and Georgia. Maryland initially offered toleration for Catholics before establishing Anglicanism in 1692 after the Glorious Revolution in England. Colonies such as Pennsylvania, Delaware, New Jersey, and Rhode Island had no official church and promoted varying degrees of religious freedom.

The New England colonies were settled partially by English who faced religious persecution. They were conceived and established "as plantations of religion." Some settlers who arrived in these areas came for secular motives—"to catch fish" as one New Englander put it—but the great majority left Europe to worship in the way they believed to be correct. They supported the efforts of their leaders to create "a City upon a Hill" or a "holy experiment," whose success would prove that God's plan could be successfully realized in the American wilderness.

=== Puritans ===
Puritanism was not a religion of its own, but rather was a movement, started in England, to reform Protestantism. However, the first Puritans in America who were called such have arrived between 1629 and 1640 and settled in New England, specifically the Massachusetts Bay area. These did not consider themselves completely separated from the English Church, however, and originally believed that they would one day return to purify England.

Puritans are often confused with a distinct, but similar sect of Protestants, called Separatists, who also believed that the Church of England was corrupt. However, Separatists believed that nothing more could be done to purify England itself. Separatists were persecuted, and their religion was outlawed in England, so they resolved to form a pure church of their own. One group of these, the Pilgrims, left England for America in 1620, originally settling in Plymouth, Massachusetts. These are the settlers who founded the tradition of Thanksgiving in America. They are also the group that many people attempt to pay homage to by dressing in dull colors and buckled hats. However, the Pilgrims did not actually dress as such.

Together, the Pilgrims and the Puritans helped to form the Massachusetts Bay Colony. While it is difficult to define a distinct time that Puritanism ended or a reason why it ended, one of the reasons most cited is that they became less committed to their religion. Also, while there is some disagreement on an exact end point, most sources agree that puritanism had declined by the beginning of the 18th century.

Puritans valued, among other things, soberness, diligence, education, and responsibility. They believed in predestination and were intolerant of all that they considered impure, including, but not limited to, Catholicism. While they intended to purify England, they nevertheless chose their ministers and members independently.

Puritan values may have had some influence on American ideals, such as individualism. For example, the puritan concept of justification-by-faith emphasized the personal values of the individual. Moreover, their physical break from the Church of England (although they did not consider themselves fully separate) proves their independence. The Pilgrims may have had an influence as well. In fact, upon their first arrival in America, the Pilgrims signed the Mayflower Compact, a document which set up a government independent of England's control (albeit, a temporary government) which could be thought of as a predecessor to the non-temporary Declaration of Independence.

=== Establishment in the colonial era ===
Early immigrants to the American colonies were motivated largely by the desire to worship freely in their own fashion, particularly after the English Civil War, but also religious wars and disputes in France and Germany. They included numerous nonconformists such as the Puritans and the Pilgrims, as well as Catholics (in Baltimore). Despite a common background, the groups' views on broader religious toleration were mixed. While some notable examples such as Roger Williams of Rhode Island and William Penn ensured the protection of religious minorities within their colonies, others such as the Plymouth Colony and Massachusetts Bay Colony had established Congregational churches. The Dutch colony of the New Netherlands had also established the Dutch Reformed Church and outlawed all other worship, although enforcement by the Dutch West India Company in the last years of the colony was sparse. Part of the reason for establishment was financial: the established Church was responsible for poor relief, and dissenting churches would therefore have a significant advantage.

There were also opponents to the support of any established church even at the state level. In 1773, Isaac Backus, a prominent Baptist minister in New England, observed that when "church and state are separate, the effects are happy, and they do not at all interfere with each other: but where they have been confounded together, no tongue nor pen can fully describe the mischiefs that have ensued." Thomas Jefferson's influential Virginia Statute for Religious Freedom was enacted in 1786, five years before the Bill of Rights.

Most Anglican ministers, and many Anglicans outside the South, were Loyalists. The Anglican Church was disestablished during the Revolution, and following the separation from Britain was reorganized as the independent Episcopal Church.

=== Persecution in America ===
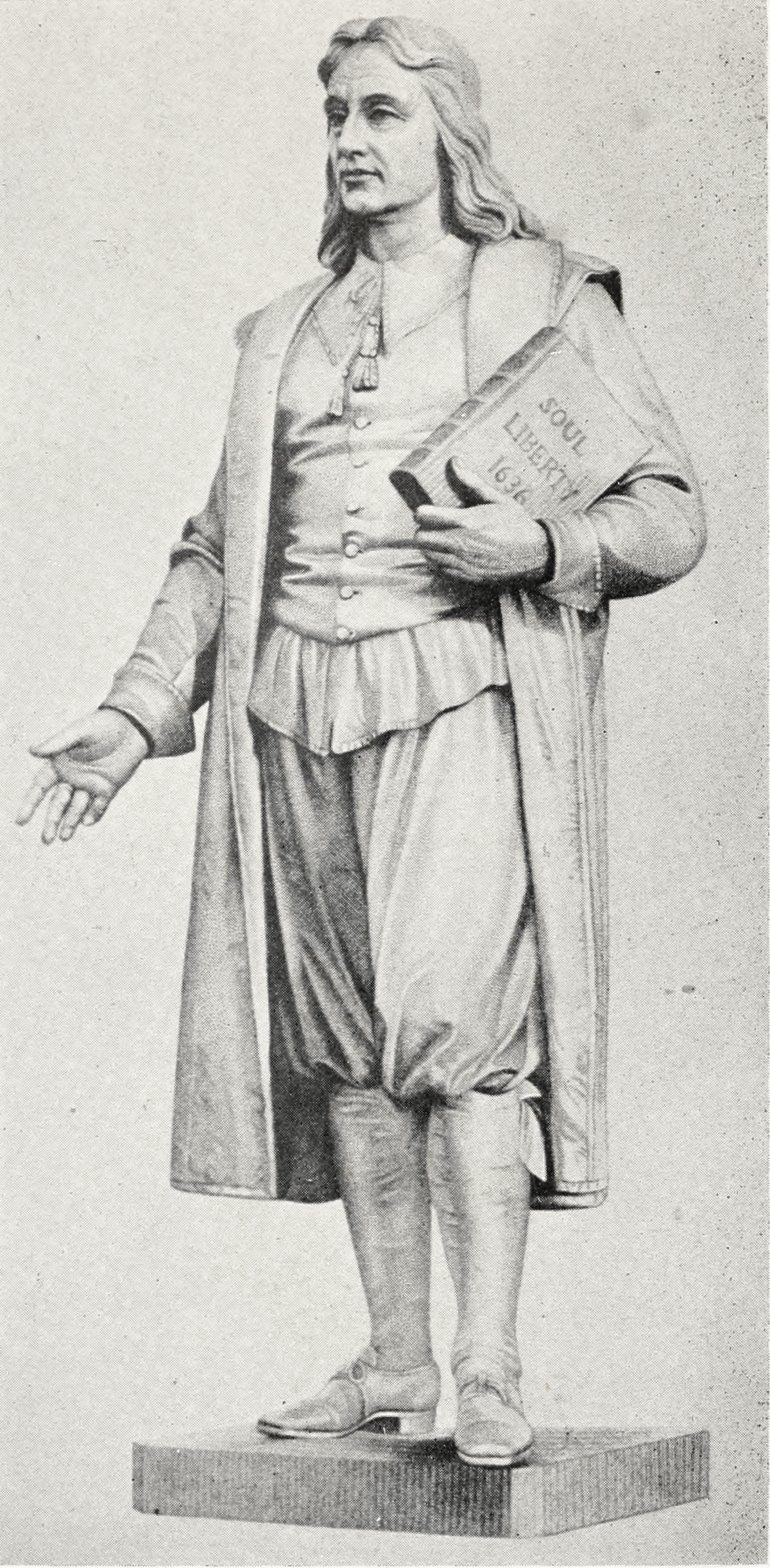
Roger Williams was expelled from the Massachusetts Bay Colony in 1636 for advocating religious liberty.

Although they were victims of religious persecution in Europe, the Puritans supported the theory that sanctioned it: the need for uniformity of religion in the state.

Once in control in New England, they sought to break "the very neck of Schism and vile opinions." The "business" of the first settlers, a Puritan minister recalled in 1681, "was not Toleration, but [they] were professed enemies of it." Puritans expelled dissenters from their colonies, a fate that in 1636 befell Roger Williams and in 1638 Anne Hutchinson, America's first major female religious leader.

Those who defied the Puritans by persistently returning to their jurisdictions risked capital punishment, a penalty imposed on the Boston martyrs, four Quakers, between 1659 and 1661. Reflecting on the 17th century's intolerance, Thomas Jefferson was unwilling to concede to Virginians any moral superiority to the Puritans. Beginning in 1659, Virginia enacted anti-Quaker laws, including the death penalty for refractory Quakers. Jefferson surmised that "if no capital execution took place here, as did in New England, it was not owing to the moderation of the church, or the spirit of the legislature."

Puritans also began the Salem Witch trials, named after the city that they were held in, Salem, Massachusetts. Starting with seizures of the local reverend's daughter as well as her subsequent accusations, more than 200 people were accused of practicing witchcraft, and 20 were executed. The colony eventually realized that the trials were a mistake and tried to help the families of the convicted members.

==== Founding of Rhode Island ====
In the winter of 1636, former Puritan leader Roger Williams was expelled from Massachusetts. He argued for freedom of religion, writing "God requireth not an uniformity of Religion to be inacted and enforced in any civill state." Williams later founded Rhode Island on the principle of religious freedom. He welcomed people of religious belief, even some he regarded as dangerously misguided, because he believed that "forced worship stinks in God's nostrils."

=== Jewish refuge in America ===
The first record of Jews in America cites their origin as passengers aboard the Dutch ship, St. Catrina. These records were kept by Jan Pietersz Ketel who was a skipper aboard the Peereboom, which was an Amsterdam ship that arrived near the same time as the St. Catrina. According to Jan Pietersz Ketel, 23 Jewish refugees, fleeing persecution in Dutch Brazil, arrived in New Amsterdam (soon to become New York City) in 1654. By the next year, this small community had established religious services in the city. Around 1677, a group of Sephardim had arrived in Newport, Rhode Island, also seeking religious liberty and, by 1678, they had purchased land in Newport. Small numbers of Jews continued to come to the British North American colonies, settling mainly in the seaport towns. By the late 18th century, Jewish settlers had established several synagogues.

=== Quakers ===
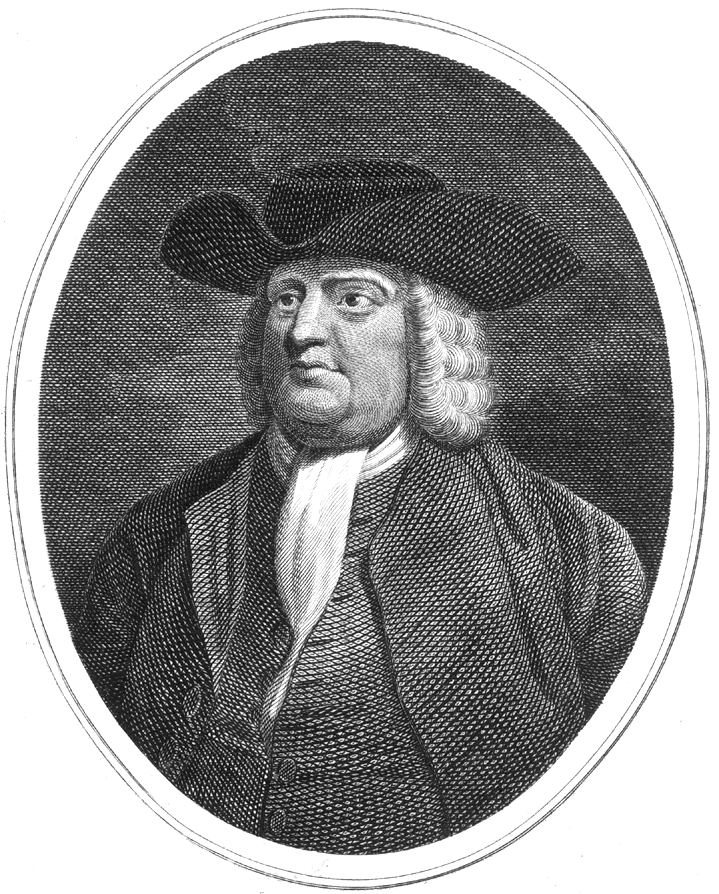
William Penn founded Pennsylvania.

The Religious Society of Friends formed in England in 1652 around leader George Fox. Recently, church historians have debated whether Quakers may be regarded as radical Puritans since the Quakers carry to extremes many Puritan convictions. Historians in support of the Puritan classification of Quakers argue that Quakers stretch the sober deportment of the Puritans into a glorification of "plainness." Theologically, they expanded the Puritan concept of a church of individuals regenerated by the Holy Spirit to the idea of the indwelling of the Spirit or the "Light of Christ" in every person.

Such teaching struck many of the Quakers' contemporaries as dangerous heresy. Quakers were severely persecuted in England for daring to deviate so far from orthodox Christianity. By 1680, 10,000 Quakers had been imprisoned in England and 243 had died of torture and mistreatment in jail.

This persecution impelled Friends to seek refuge in Rhode Island in the 1670s, where they soon became well entrenched. In 1681, when Quaker leader William Penn parlayed a debt owed by Charles II to his father into a charter for the province of Pennsylvania, many more Quakers were prepared to grasp the opportunity to live in a land where they might worship freely. By 1685, as many as 8,000 Quakers had come to Pennsylvania from England, Wales, and Ireland. Although the Quakers may have resembled the Puritans in some religious beliefs and practices, they differed with them over the necessity of compelling religious uniformity in society.

=== Pennsylvania Germans ===
During the main years of German emigration to Pennsylvania in the mid-18th century, most of the emigrants were Lutherans, Reformed, or members of small sects—Mennonites, Amish, Dunkers, Moravians, and Schwenkfelders. The great majority became farmers.

The colony was owned by William Penn, a leading Quaker, and his agents encouraged German emigration to Pennsylvania by circulating promotional literature touting the economic advantages of Pennsylvania as well as the religious liberty available there. The appearance in Pennsylvania of so many religious groups made the province resemble "an asylum for banished sects."

=== Catholics in Maryland ===
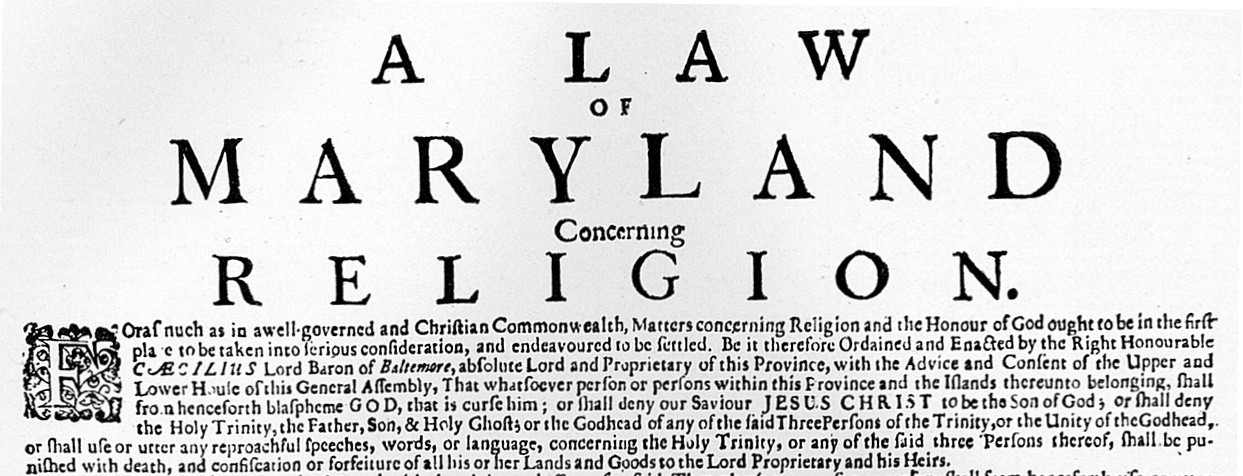
The Maryland Toleration Act, passed in 1649.

For their political opposition, Catholics were harassed and had largely been stripped of their civil rights since the reign of Queen Elizabeth I. Driven by "the sacred duty of finding a refuge for his Roman Catholic brethren", George Calvert obtained a charter from Charles I in 1632 for the territory between Pennsylvania and Virginia. This Maryland charter offered no guidelines on religion, although it was assumed that Catholics would not be persecuted in the new colony. His son Lord Baltimore, was a Catholic who inherited the grant for Maryland from his father and was in charge 1630–1645. In 1634, Lord Baltimore's two ships, the Ark and the Dove, sailed with the first 200 settlers to Maryland. They included two Catholic priests. Lord Baltimore assumed that religion was a private matter. He rejected the need for an established church, guaranteed liberty of conscience to all Christians, and embraced pluralism.

Catholic fortunes fluctuated in Maryland during the rest of the 17th century, as they became an increasingly smaller minority of the population. After the Glorious Revolution of 1689 in England, the Church of England was legally established in the colony and English penal laws, which deprived Catholics of the right to vote, hold office, or worship publicly, were enforced. Maryland's first state constitution in 1776 restored the freedom of religion. Maryland law remained a major center, as exemplified by the pre-eminence of the Archdiocese of Baltimore in Catholic circles. However, at the time of the American Revolution, Catholics formed less than one percent of the white population of the thirteen states. Religiously, the Catholics were characterized by personalism, discipline, and a prayer life that was essentially personal, demanding only a small role for priests and none for bishops. Ritualism was important, and focused on daily prayers, Sunday Mass, and observance of two dozen holy days.

=== Virginia and the Church of England ===
Virginia was the largest, most populous and arguably most important colony. The Church of England was legally established; the bishop of London who had oversight of Anglican in the colonies made it a favorite missionary target and sent in 22 clergymen (in priestly orders) by 1624. In practice, establishment meant that local taxes were funneled through the local parish to handle the needs of local government, such as roads and poor relief, in addition to the salary of the minister. There was never a bishop in colonial Virginia, and in practice the local vestry consisted of laymen who controlled the parish and handled local taxes, roads and poor relief.

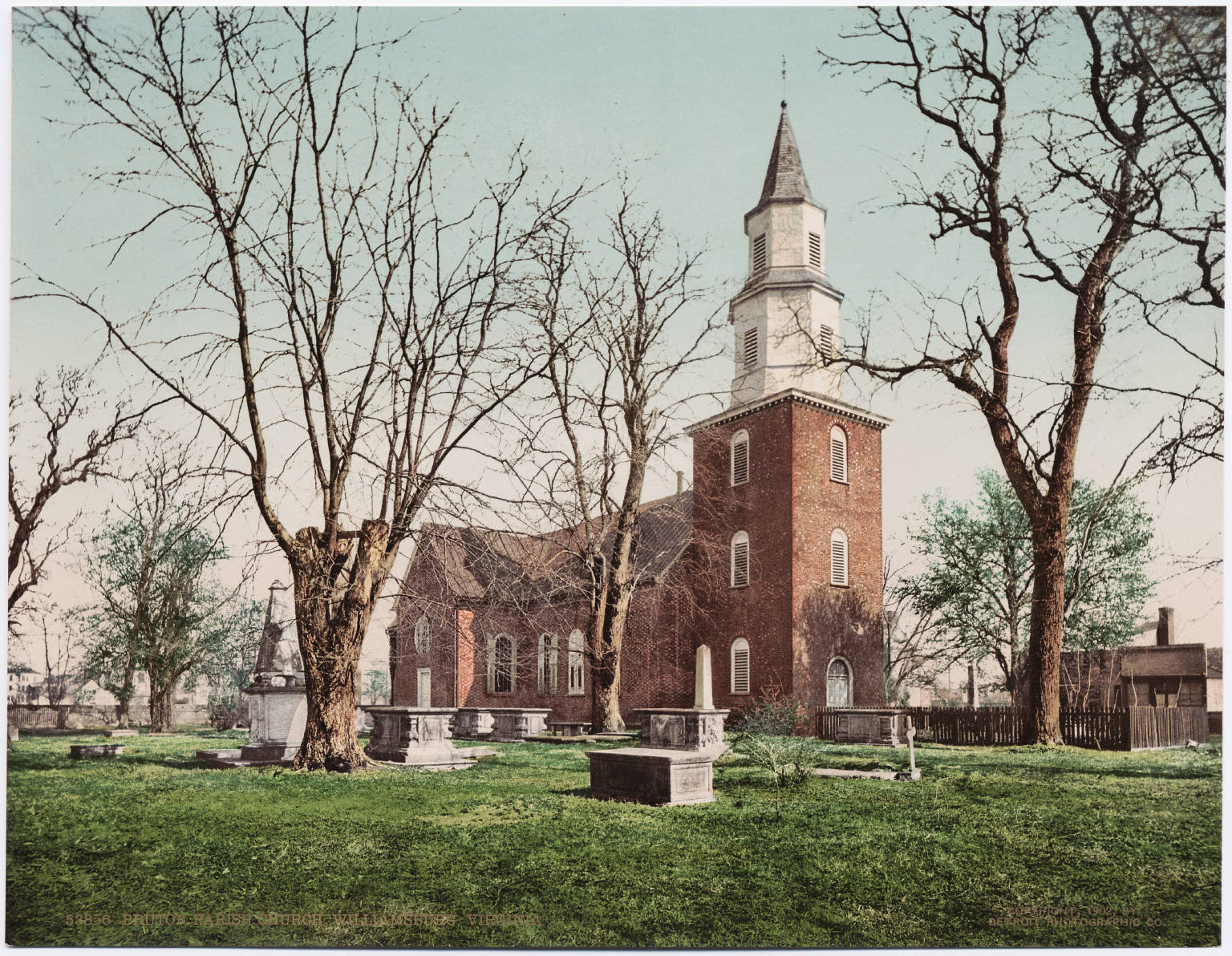
The Bruton Parish Church in Williamsburg. Government and college officials in the capital at Williamsburg were required to attend services at this Anglican church.

When the elected assembly, the House of Burgesses, was established in 1619, it enacted religious laws that made Virginia highly favor Anglicanism. It passed a law in 1632 requiring that there be a "uniformitie throughout this colony both in substance and circumstance to the cannons and constitution of the Church of England."

The colonists were typically uninterested during church services according to the ministers, who complained that the people were not paying attention. The lack of towns meant the church had to serve scattered settlements, while the acute shortage of trained ministers meant that piety was hard to practice outside the home. Some ministers solved their problems by encouraging parishioners to become devout at home, using the Book of Common Prayer for private prayer and devotion (rather than the Bible). This allowed devout Anglicans to lead an active and sincere religious life apart from the unsatisfactory formal church services. However, the stress on private devotion weakened the need for a bishop or a large institutional church of the sort Blair wanted. The stress on personal piety opened the way for the First Great Awakening, which pulled people away from the established church.

The Baptists, Methodists, Presbyterians, and other evangelicals challenged behavior they saw as immoral and created a male leadership role that followed principles they saw as Christian and became dominant in the 19th century. Baptists, German Lutherans and Presbyterians funded their own ministers, and favored disestablishment of the Anglican church. The dissenters grew much faster than the established church, making religious division a factor in Virginia politics into the Revolution. The Patriots, led by Thomas Jefferson, disestablished the Anglican Church in 1786.

=== Growth of Christianity in the 18th century ===
Against a prevailing view that 18th-century Americans had not perpetuated the first settlers' passionate commitment to their faith, scholars now identify a high level of religious energy in colonies after 1700. According to one expert, Judeo-Christian faith was in the "ascension rather than the declension"; another sees a "rising vitality in religious life" from 1700 onward; a third finds religion in many parts of the colonies in a state of "feverish growth." Figures on church attendance and church formation support these opinions. Between 1700 and 1740, an estimated 75–80% of the population attended churches, which were being built at a headlong pace.

By 1780, the percentage of adult colonists who adhered to a church was between 10 and 30%, not counting slaves or Native Americans. North Carolina had the lowest percentage at about 4%, while New Hampshire and South Carolina were tied for the highest, at about 16%.

Church buildings in 18th-century America varied greatly, from the plain, modest buildings in newly settled rural areas to elegant edifices in the prosperous cities on the eastern seaboard. Churches reflected the customs and traditions as well as the wealth and social status of the denominations that built them. German churches contained features unknown in English ones.

=== Deism ===
Deism is a philosophical and religious position that posits that God does not interfere directly with the world. These views gained some adherents in America in the late 18th century. Deism of that era "accepted the existence of a creator on the basis of reason but rejected belief in a supernatural deity who interacts with humankind." A form of deism, Christian deism, stressed morality and rejected the orthodox Christian view of the divinity of Christ, often viewing him as a sublime, but entirely human, teacher of morality. The most prominent Deist was Thomas Paine, but many other founders reflected Deist language in their writings.

=== First Great Awakening: emergence of evangelicalism ===
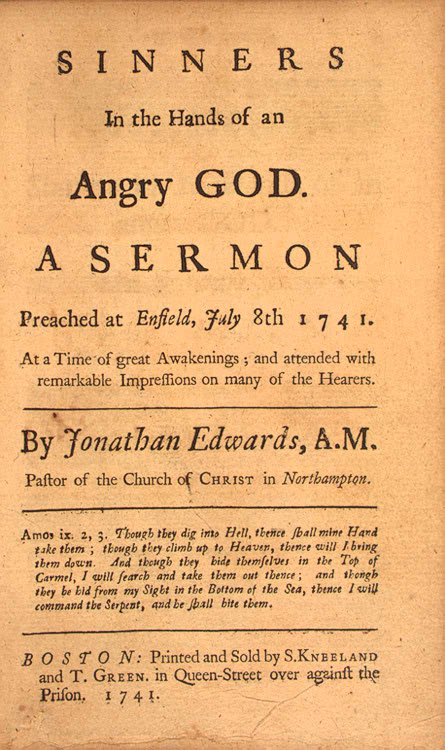
Edwards, Rev. Jonathan (July 8, 1741), Sinners in the Hands of an Angry God, A Sermon Preached at Enfield

In the American colonies the First Great Awakening was a wave of religious enthusiasm among Protestants that swept the American colonies in the 1730s and 1740s, leaving a permanent impact on American Christianity. It resulted from preaching that deeply affected listeners (already church members) with a sense of personal guilt and salvation by Christ. Pulling away from ritual and ceremony, the Great Awakening made relationship with God intensely personal to the average person. Historian Sydney E. Ahlstrom sees it as part of a "great international Protestant upheaval" that also created Pietism in Germany, the Evangelical Revival and Methodism in England. It brought Christianity to enslaved people and was an apocalyptic event in New England that challenged established church authority. It resulted in division between the new revivalists and the old traditionalists who insisted on ritual and doctrine. The new style of sermons and the way people practiced their faith changed Christian faith in America. People became passionately and emotionally involved in their relationship with God, rather than passively listening to intellectual discourse. Ministers who used this new style of preaching were generally called "new lights", while preachers who did not were called "old lights". People began to study the Bible at home, which effectively decentralized the means of informing the public on religious manners and was akin to the individualistic trends present in Europe during the Reformation.

The fundamental premise of evangelicalism is the conversion of individuals from a state of sin to a "new birth" through preaching of the Bible leading to faith. The First Great Awakening led to changes in American colonial society. In New England, the Great Awakening was influential among many Congregationalists. In the Middle and Southern colonies, especially in the "Backcountry" regions, the Awakening was influential among Presbyterians. In the South Baptist and Methodist preachers converted both whites and enslaved Blacks.

During the first decades of the 18th century, in the Connecticut River Valley, a series of local "awakenings" began in the Congregational church with ministers including Jonathan Edwards. The first new Congregational Church in the Massachusetts Colony during the great awakening period, was in 1731 at Uxbridge and called the Rev. Nathan Webb as its Pastor. By the 1730s, they had spread into what was interpreted as a general outpouring of the Spirit that bathed the American colonies, England, Wales, and Scotland.

In mass open-air revivals, preachers like George Whitefield brought thousands of people to the new birth. The Great Awakening, which had spent its force in New England by the mid-1740s, split the Congregational and Presbyterian churches into supporters—called "New Lights" and "New Side"—and opponents—the "Old Lights" and "Old Side." Many New England New Lights became Separate Baptists. Largely through the efforts of a charismatic preacher from New England named Shubal Stearns and paralleled by the New Side Presbyterians (who were eventually reunited on their own terms with the Old Side), they carried the Great Awakening into the southern colonies, igniting a series of the revivals that lasted well into the 19th century.

The supporters of the Awakening and its evangelical thrust—Presbyterians, Baptists, and Methodists—became the largest American Protestant denominations by the first decades of the 19th century. Opponents of the Awakening or those split by it—Anglicans, Quakers, and Congregationalists—were left behind.

Unlike the Second Great Awakening that began about 1800 and which reached out to the unchurched, the First Great Awakening focused on people who were already church members. It changed their rituals, their piety, and their self-awareness.

=== Evangelicals in the South ===
The South had originally been settled and controlled by Anglicans, who dominated the ranks of rich planters but whose ritualistic high church established religion had little appeal to ordinary men and women, both white and black.

==== Baptists ====
Energized by numerous itinerant missionaries, by the 1760s, Baptist churches started drawing Southerners, especially poor white farmers, into a new, much more democratic religion. They welcomed slaves to their services, and many slaves became Baptists at this time. Baptist services emphasized emotion; the only ritual, baptism, involved immersion (not sprinkling as in the Anglican tradition) of adults only. The Baptists enforced standards against sexual misconduct, heavy drinking, frivolous spending, missing services, cursing, and revelry, among other behaviors. Church trials took place frequently, and Baptist churches expelled members who did not submit to discipline.

Many historians have debated the implications of the religious rivalries for the coming of the American Revolution of 1765–1783. The Baptist farmers did introduce a new egalitarian ethic that largely displaced the semi-aristocratic ethic of the Anglican planters. However, both groups supported the Revolution. There was a sharp contrast between the austerity of the plain-living Baptists and the opulence of the Anglican planters, who controlled local government. Baptist church discipline, mistaken by the gentry for radicalism, served to ameliorate disorder. The struggle for religious toleration erupted and played out during the American Revolution, as the Baptists worked to disestablish the Anglican church.

Baptists, German Lutherans, and Presbyterians funded their own ministers, and favored disestablishment of the Anglican church.

==== Methodists ====
Methodist missionaries were also active in the late colonial period. From 1776 to 1815 ,Methodist Bishop Francis Asbury made 42 trips into the western United States to visit Methodist congregations. In the 1780s, itinerant Methodist preachers carried copies of an anti-slavery petition in their saddlebags throughout the state, calling for an end to slavery. At the same time, counter-petitions were circulated. The petitions were presented to the Assembly; they were debated, but no legislative action was taken, and after 1800, there was less and less religious opposition to slavery.

== American Revolution ==
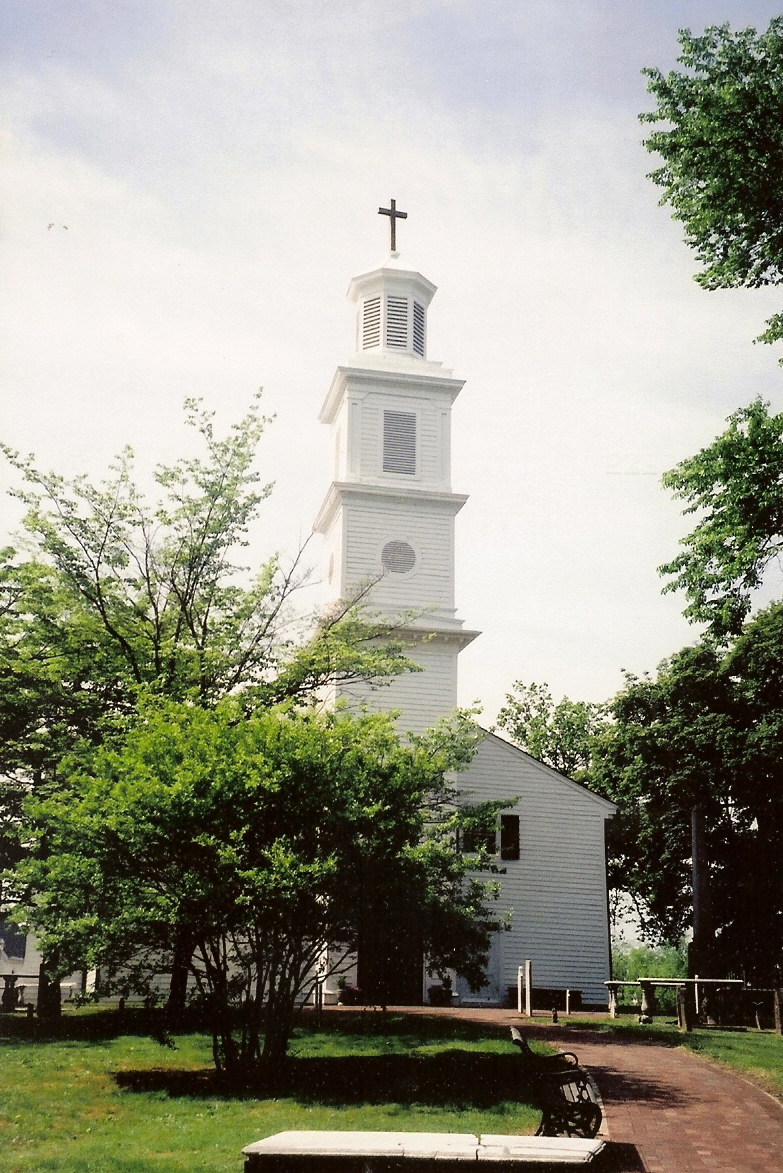
St. John's Episcopal Church is the oldest church in Richmond, Virginia, and the site of the Second Virginia Convention where Patrick Henry delivered his 1775 "Give me liberty or give me death!" speech.

The Revolution split some denominations, notably the Church of England, whose clergy (priests often referred to as 'ministers') were bound by oath to support the king, and the Quakers, who were traditionally pacifists. Religious practice was reduced in certain places because of the absence of ministers and the destruction of churches.

=== Church of England ===
The American Revolution inflicted deeper wounds on the Church of England in America than on any other denomination because the English monarch was the head of the church. Church of England priests, at their ordination, swore allegiance to the British crown.

The Book of Common Prayer offered prayers for the monarch, beseeching God "to be his defender and keeper, giving him victory over all his enemies", who in 1776 were American soldiers as well as friends and neighbors of American parishioners of the Church of England. Loyalty to the church and to its head could be construed as treason to the American cause.

Patriotic American members of the Church of England, loathing to discard so fundamental a component of their faith as the Book of Common Prayer, revised it to conform to the political realities. After the Treaty of Paris in which Great Britain formally recognized American independence, Anglicans were left without leadership or a formal institution. Samuel Seabury was consecrated bishop by the Scottish Episcopal Church in 1784. He resided in New York. After the requirement to take an Oath of Allegiance to the Crown two Americans were consecrated bishops in London in 1786 for Virginia and Pennsylvania. The Protestant Episcopal Church of the United States was created in 1787 as an autonomous in communion with the Church of England. It adopted a modified Book of Common Prayer which most notably used the Scottish Canon (Eucharistic Prayer). This consecration prayer moved the Eucharistic doctrine of the American Church much closer to the Catholic and Orthodox teachings and virtually undid Cranmer's rejection of the Eucharist as a material sacrifice offered to God (which had been the accepted theology from the early 3rd century).

=== Presbyterians ===
Church of England leaders, who were primarily aligned with the Loyalist elements during the Revolution, often described the American Revolution as a "Presbyterian Rebellion" insofar as Presbyterians were their most outspoken opponents. This view was shared by King George III himself.

== American Revolution to Civil War ==
Historians in recent decades have debated the nature of American religiosity in the early 19th century, focusing on issues of secularism, deism, traditional religious practices, and newly emerging evangelical forms based on the Great Awakening.

=== Constitution ===
The Constitution ratified in 1788 makes no mention of religion except in Article Six, where it specifies that "No religious test shall ever be required as a Qualification to any Office or public Trust under the United States." However, most colonies had a Test Act, and several states retained them for a short time. The Fourteenth Amendment later extended this prohibition to the states. However, the First Amendment to the United States Constitution, adopted in 1791, has played a central role in defining the relationship of the federal government to the free exercise of religion, and to the prohibition of the establishment of an official church. Its policies were extended to cover state governments in the 1940s. It states "Congress shall make no law respecting an establishment of religion, or prohibiting the free exercise thereof." The two parts, known as the "establishment clause" and the "free exercise clause" respectively, form the textual basis for the Supreme Court's interpretations of the "separation of church and state" doctrine. On August 15, 1789, Madison said, "he apprehended the meaning of the words to be, that Congress should not establish a religion, and enforce the legal observation of it by law, nor compel men to worship God in any manner contrary to their conscience...." All states disestablished religion by 1833; Massachusetts was the last state. This ended the practice of allocating taxes to churches.

==== Establishment Clause ====
The Establishment Clause of the First Amendment to the United States Constitution reads, "Congress shall make no law respecting an establishment of religion, or prohibiting the free exercise thereof..." In a letter written in 1802, Thomas Jefferson used the phrase "separation of church and state" to describe the combined effect of the Establishment Clause and the Free Exercise Clause of the First Amendment. Though "separation of church and state" does not appear in the Constitution, it has since been quoted in several opinions handed down by the United States Supreme Court.

Robert N. Bellah has argued in his writings that although the separation of church and state is grounded firmly in the constitution of the United States, this does not mean that there is no religious dimension in the political society of the United States. He used the term civil religion to describe the specific relation between politics and religion in the United States. His 1967 article analyzes the inaugural speech of John F. Kennedy: "Considering the separation of church and state, how is a president justified in using the word 'God' at all? The answer is that the separation of church and state has not denied the political realm a religious dimension."

This is not only the subject of a sociological discussion, but can also be an issue for atheists in America. There are allegations of discrimination against atheists in the United States.

=== Jefferson, Madison, and the "wall of separation" ===
The phrase a "hedge or wall of separation between the garden of the church and the wilderness of the world" was first used by Baptist theologian Roger Williams, the founder of the colony of Rhode Island. It was later used by Jefferson as a commentary on the First Amendment and its restriction on the legislative branch of the federal government, in an 1802 letter.

Jefferson's and Madison's conceptions of separation have long been debated. Jefferson refused to issue Proclamations of Thanksgiving sent to him by Congress during his presidency, though he did issue a Thanksgiving and Prayer proclamation as Governor of Virginia and vetoed two bills on the grounds they violated the first amendment.

After retiring from the presidency, Madison argued in his Detached Memoranda for a stronger separation of church and state, opposing the very presidential issuing of religious proclamations he himself had done, and also opposing the appointment of chaplains to Congress.

Jefferson's opponents said his position meant the rejection of Christianity, but this was a caricature. In setting up the University of Virginia, Jefferson encouraged all the separate sects to have preachers of their own, though there was a constitutional ban on the State supporting a Professorship of Divinity, arising from his own Virginia Statute for Religious Freedom

=== Treaty of Tripoli ===
The Treaty of Tripoli was a treaty concluded between the US and Tripolitania submitted to the Senate by President John Adams, receiving ratification unanimously from the US Senate on June 7, 1797, and signed by Adams, taking effect as the law of the land on June 10, 1797. The treaty was a routine diplomatic agreement but has attracted later attention because the English version included a clause about religion in the United States.

As the Government of the United States of America is not, in any sense, founded on the Christian religion,—as it has in itself no character of enmity against the laws, religion, or tranquility, of Mussulmen [Muslims],—and as the said States never entered into any war or act of hostility against any Mahometan [Mohammedan] nation, it is declared by the parties that no pretext arising from religious opinions shall ever produce an interruption of the harmony existing between the two countries.

Historian Frank Lambert says of the treaty: "By their actions, the Founding Fathers made clear that their primary concern was religious freedom… Ten years after the Constitutional Convention ended its work, the country assured the world that the United States was a secular state"

Notwithstanding the clear separation of government and religion, the predominant cultural and social nature of the nation did become strongly Christian. In the employment case of Church of the Holy Trinity v. United States (1892), the US Supreme Court stated, "These, and many other matters which might be noticed, add a volume of unofficial declarations to the mass of organic utterances that this is a Christian nation."

=== Great Awakenings and evangelicalism ===
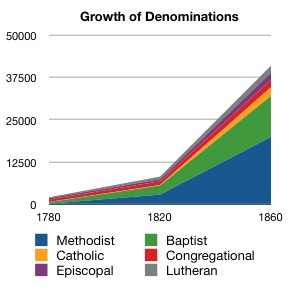
During the Second Great Awakening, the number of local churches rose sharply; total membership in the denominations (not shown) also grew.

The "Great Awakenings" were large-scale revivals that came in spurts, and moved large numbers of people from unchurched to churched. The Methodists and Baptists were the most active at sponsoring revivals. The number of Methodist church members grew from 58,000 in 1790 to 258,000 in 1820 and 1,661,000 in 1860. Over 70 years, Methodist membership grew by a factor of 28.6 times when the total national population grew by a factor of eight times.

It made evangelicalism one of the dominant forces in American religion. Balmer explains that:

"Evangelicalism itself, I believe, is quintessentially North American phenomenon, deriving as it did from the confluence of Pietism, Presbyterianism, and the vestiges of Puritanism. Evangelicalism picked up the peculiar characteristics from each strain – warmhearted spirituality from the Pietists (for instance), doctrinal precisionism from the Presbyterians, and individualistic introspection from the Puritans – even as the North American context itself has profoundly shaped the various manifestations of evangelicalism: fundamentalism, neo-evangelicalism, the holiness movement, Pentecostalism, the charismatic movement, and various forms of African-American and Hispanic evangelicalism."

==== Second Great Awakening ====
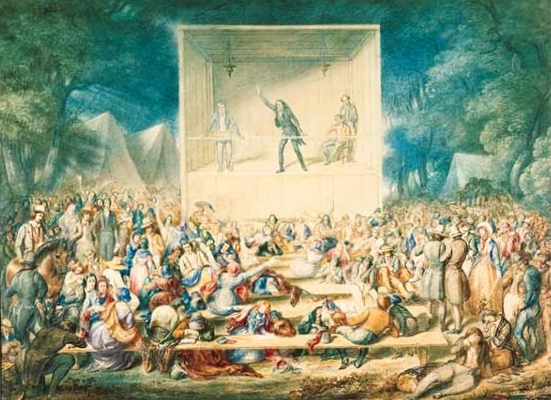
1839 Methodist camp meeting

In 1800, major revivals began that spread across the nation: the Second Great Awakening in New England and the Great Revival in Cane Ridge, Kentucky. The principal religious innovation produced by the Kentucky revivals was the camp meeting.

The revivals at first were organized by Presbyterian ministers who modeled them after the extended outdoor communion seasons, used by the Presbyterian Church in Scotland, which frequently produced emotional, demonstrative displays of religious conviction. In Kentucky, the pioneers loaded their families and provisions into their wagons and drove to the Presbyterian meetings, where they pitched tents and settled in for several days.

When assembled in a field or at the edge of a forest for a prolonged religious meeting, the participants transformed the site into a camp meeting. The religious revivals that swept the Kentucky camp meetings were so intense and created such gusts of emotion that their original sponsors, the Presbyterians, as well the Baptists, soon repudiated them. The Methodists, however, adopted and eventually domesticated camp meetings and introduced them into the eastern states, where for decades they were one of the evangelical signatures of the denomination.

The Second Great Awakening (1800–1830s), unlike the first, focused on the unchurched and sought to instill in them a sense of personal salvation as experienced in revival meetings. This revival quickly spread throughout Kentucky, Tennessee and southern Ohio. Each denomination had assets that allowed it to thrive on the frontier. For example, the Methodists had an efficient organization that depended on ministers known as circuit riders, who sought out people in remote frontier locations. The circuit riders came from among the common people, which helped them establish rapport with the frontier families they hoped to convert.

The Second Great Awakening exercised a profound impact on American religious history. By 1859 evangelicalism emerged as a kind of national church or national religion and was the grand absorbing theme of American religious life. The greatest gains were made by the very well organized Methodists. Francis Asbury (1745–1816) led the American Methodist movement as one of the most prominent religious leaders of the young republic. Traveling throughout the eastern seaboard, Methodism grew quickly under Asbury's leadership into the nation's largest and most widespread denomination. The numerical strength of the Baptists and Methodists rose relative to that of the denominations dominant in the colonial period—the Anglicans, Presbyterians, Congregationalists, and Reformed. Efforts to apply Christian teaching to the resolution of social problems presaged the Social Gospel of the late 19th century. It also sparked the beginnings of groups such as the Latter Day Saint movement, the Restoration Movement, and the Holiness movement.

==== Third Great Awakening ====
The Third Great Awakening was a period of religious activism in American history from the late 1850s to the 20th century. It affected pietistic Protestant denominations and had a strong sense of social activism. It gathered strength from the postmillennial theology that the Second Coming of Christ would come after mankind had reformed the entire earth. The Social Gospel Movement gained its force from the Awakening, as did the worldwide missionary movement. New groupings emerged, such as the Holiness movement and Nazarene movements, and Christian Science.

The Protestant mainline churches were growing rapidly in numbers, wealth and educational levels, throwing off their frontier beginnings and become centered in towns and cities. Intellectuals and writers such as Josiah Strong advocated a muscular Christianity with systematic outreach to the unchurched in America and around the globe. Others built colleges and universities to train the next generation. Each denomination supported active missionary societies, and made the role of missionary one of high prestige. The great majority of pietistic mainline Protestants (in the North) supported the Republican Party, and urged it to endorse prohibition and social reforms.

The awakening in numerous cities in 1858 was interrupted by the American Civil War. In the South, on the other hand, the Civil War stimulated revivals and strengthened the Baptists, especially. After the war, Dwight L. Moody made revivalism the centerpiece of his activities in Chicago by founding the Moody Bible Institute. The hymns of Ira Sankey were especially influential.

Across the nation drys crusaded in the name of religion for the prohibition of alcohol. The Woman's Christian Temperance Union mobilized Protestant women for social crusades against liquor, pornography and prostitution, and sparked the demand for woman suffrage.

The Gilded Age plutocracy came under harsh attack from the Social Gospel preachers and with reformers in the Progressive Era who became involved with issues of child labor, compulsory elementary education and the protection of women from exploitation in factories.

All the major denominations sponsored growing missionary activities inside the United States and around the world.

Colleges associated with churches rapidly expanded in number, size and quality of curriculum. The promotion of "muscular Christianity" became popular among young men on campus and in urban YMCAs, as well as such denominational youth groups such as the Epworth League for Methodists and the Walther League for Lutherans.

=== Benevolent and missionary societies ===
Benevolent societies were a new feature of the American landscape during the first half of the 19th century. Originally devoted to converting nonbelievers, they eventually focused on the eradication of every kind of social ill. Benevolent societies were the direct result of the extraordinary energies generated by the evangelical movement—specifically, by the "activism" resulting from conversion. "The evidence of God's grace," Presbyterian evangelist Charles Grandison Finney insisted, "was a person's benevolence toward others."

The evangelical establishment used this powerful network of voluntary, ecumenical benevolent societies to Christianize the nation. The earliest and most important of these organizations focused their efforts on the conversion of nonbelievers or to the creation of conditions (such as sobriety sought by temperance societies) in which conversions could occur. The six largest societies in 1826–1827 were: the American Education Society, the American Board of Commissioners for Foreign Missions, the American Bible Society, the American Sunday School Union, the American Tract Society, and the American Home Missionary Society.

Most denominations operated missions abroad (and some to Native Americans and Asians in the US). Hutchinson argues that the American desire to reform the secular world was greatly stimulated by the zeal of evangelical Christians. Grimshaw argues that women missionaries were enthusiastic proponents of the missionary endeavor, contributing, "substantially to the religious conversion and reorientation of Hawaiian culture in the first half of the 19th century."

=== Emergence of African American churches ===
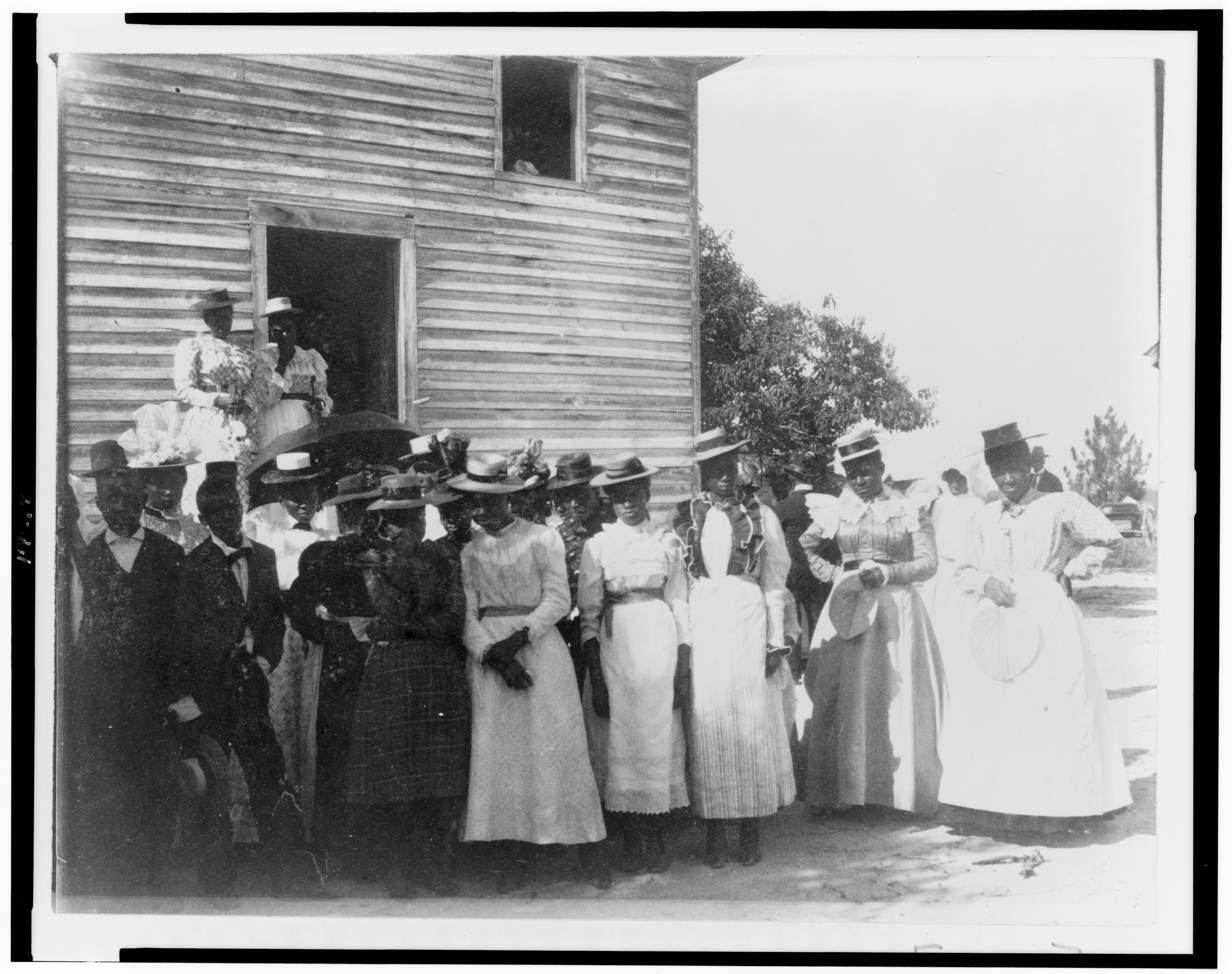
Black Americans outside a church in Georgia, 1900.

Scholars disagree about the extent of the native African content of Black Christianity as it emerged in 18th-century America, but there is no dispute that the Christianity of the Black population was grounded in evangelicalism.

The Second Great Awakening has been called the "central and defining event in the development of Afro-Christianity." During these revivals Baptists and Methodists converted large numbers of Blacks. However, many were disappointed at the treatment they received from their fellow believers and at the backsliding in the commitment to abolish slavery that many white Baptists and Methodists had advocated immediately after the American Revolution.

When their discontent could not be contained, some black leaders formed new denominations. In 1787, Richard Allen and his colleagues in Philadelphia broke away from the Methodist Church and in 1815 founded the African Methodist Episcopal (AME) Church, which, along with independent black Baptist congregations, flourished as the century progressed. By 1846, the AME Church, which began with eight clergy and five churches, had grown to 176 clergy, 296 churches, and 17,375 members.

== Civil War ==
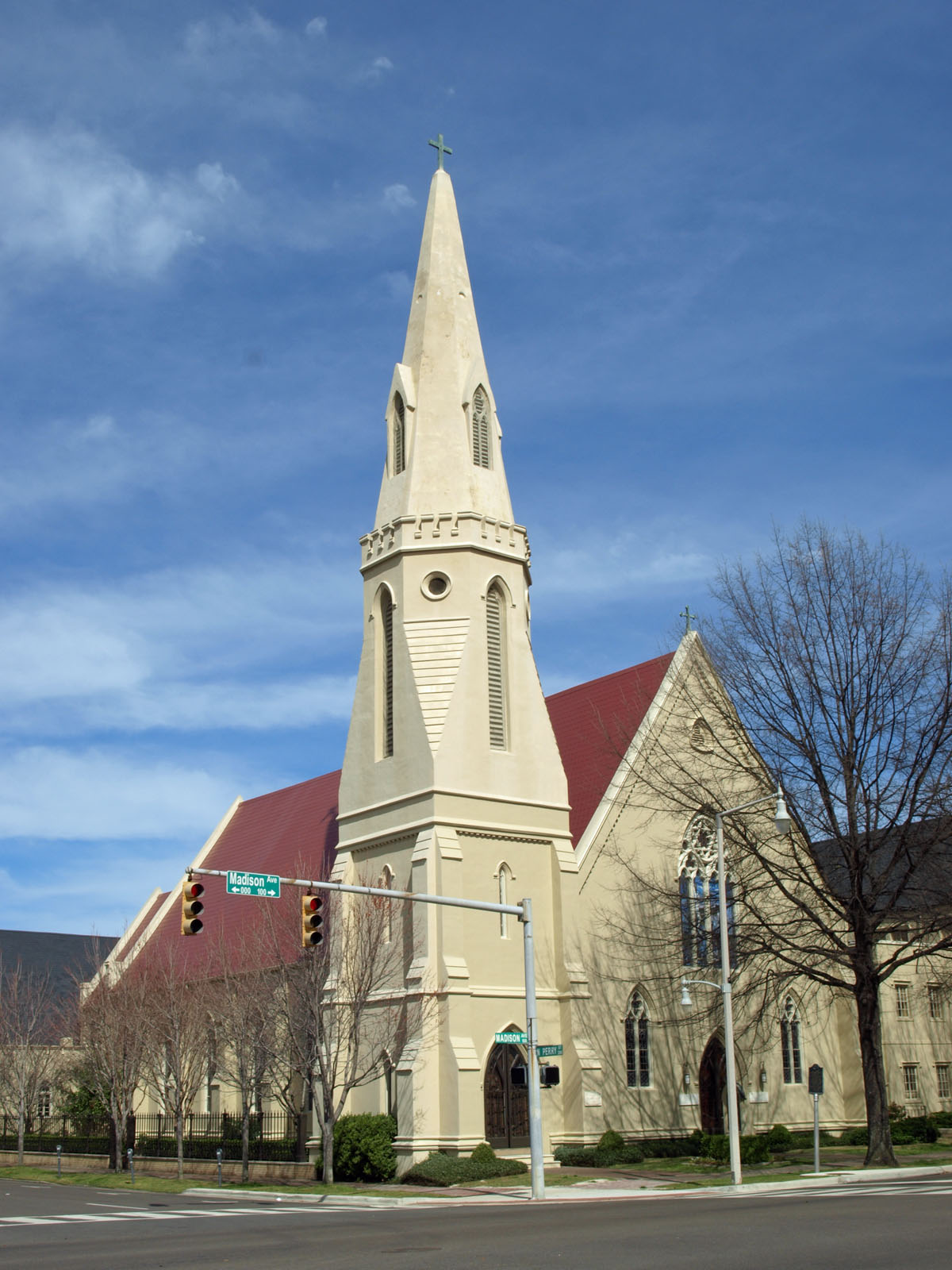
St. John's Episcopal Church in Montgomery, Alabama; The Secession Convention of Southern Churches was held here in 1861.

=== Union ===
The Protestant religion was quite strong in the North in the 1860s. The Protestant denominations took a variety of positions. In general, the pietistic or evangelical denominations such as the Methodists, Northern Baptists and Congregationalists strongly supported the war effort. More liturgical groups such as the Catholics, Episcopalians, Lutherans and conservative Presbyterians generally avoided any discussion of the war, so it would not bitterly divide their membership. Some clergymen who supported the Confederacy were denounced as Copperheads, especially in the border regions.

The churches made an effort to support their soldiers in the field and especially their families back home. Much of the political rhetoric of the era had a distinct religious tone. The interdenominational Protestant United States Christian Commission sent agents into the Army camps to provide psychological support as well as books, newspapers, food and clothing. Through prayer, sermons, and welfare operations, the agents ministered to soldiers' spiritual as well as temporal needs as they sought to bring the men to a Christian way of life.

No denomination was more active in supporting the Union than the Methodist Episcopal Church. Historian Richard Carwardine argues that many Methodists felt that the victory of Lincoln in 1860 heralded the arrival of the kingdom of God in America. They were moved into action by a vision of freedom for slaves, freedom from the persecutions of godly abolitionists, release from the Slave Power's evil grip on the American government and the promise of a new direction for the Union. Methodists gave strong support to the Radical Republicans with their hard line toward the white South. Dissident Methodists left the church. During Reconstruction the Methodists took the lead in helping form Methodist churches for Freedmen and moving into Southern cities even to the point of taking control, with Army help, of buildings that had belonged to the southern branch of the church. The Methodist family magazine Ladies' Repository promoted Christian family activism. Its articles provided moral uplift to women and children. It portrayed the Civil War as a great moral crusade against a decadent Southern civilization corrupted by slavery. It recommended activities that family members could perform in order to aid the Union cause.

=== Confederacy ===
The CSA was overwhelmingly Protestant, and revivals were common during the war, especially in Army camps. Both free and enslaved populations identified with evangelical Protestantism. Freedom of religion and separation of church and state were fully ensured by Confederate laws. Church attendance was very high and chaplains played a major role in the Army.

The slavery issue had split the evangelical denominations by 1860. During the war, the Presbyterians and Episcopalians also split. The Catholics did not split. Baptists and Methodists together formed majorities of both the free and enslaved populations. Elites in the southeast favored the Protestant Episcopal Church in the Confederate States of America, which reluctantly split off the Episcopal Church (USA) in 1861. Other elites were Presbyterians belonging to the Presbyterian Church in the United States, which split off in 1861. Joseph Ruggles Wilson (father of President Woodrow Wilson) was a prominent leader. Catholics included an Irish working class element in port cities and an old French element in southern Louisiana.

== Since the Civil War ==
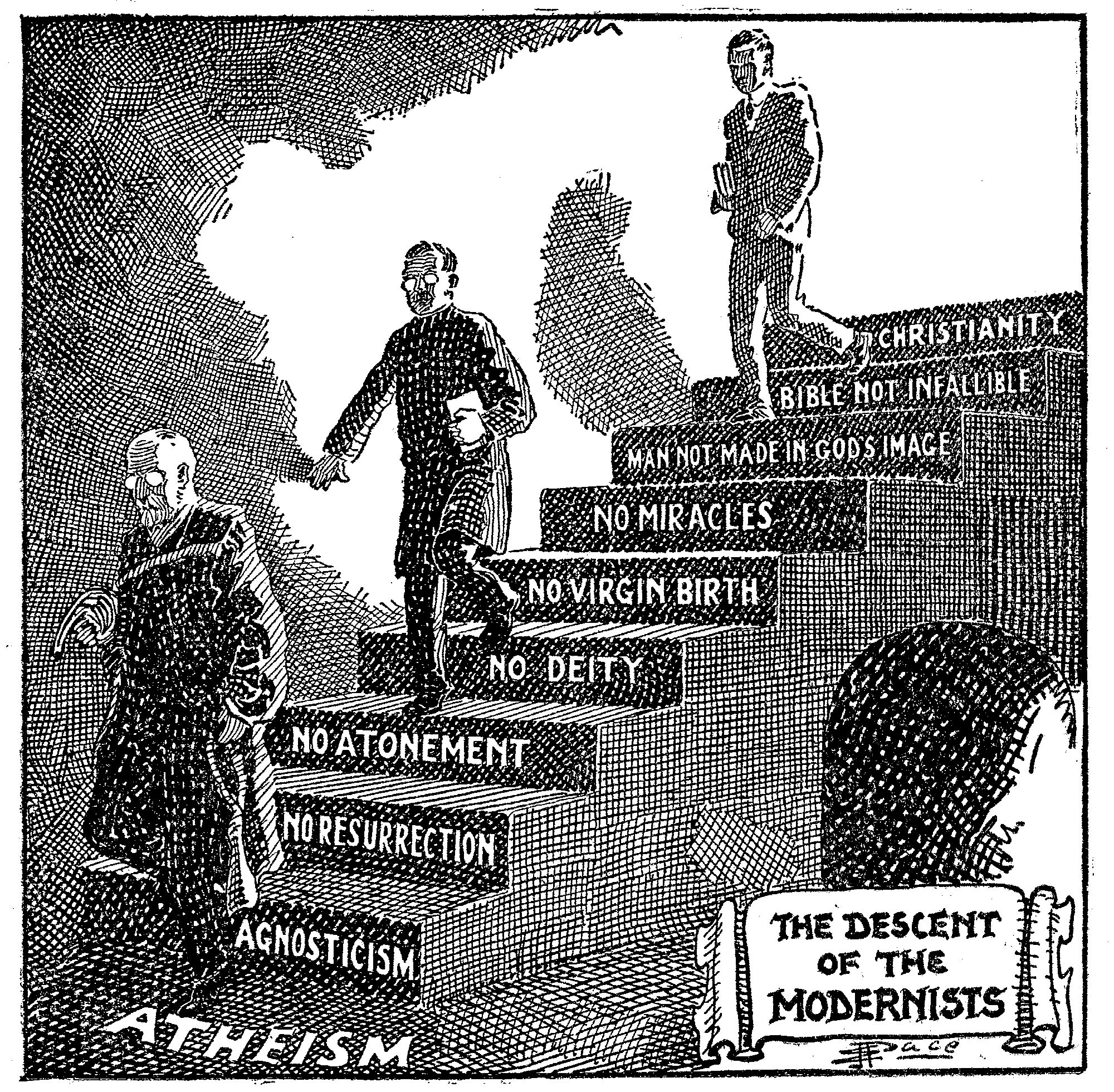
A fundamentalist cartoon by E. J. Pace portraying modernism as the descent from Christianity to atheism, first published in 1922 and then used in Seven Questions in Dispute by William Jennings Bryan.

Sidney Mead has argued organized religion met two great challenges in the late 19th century: the one to its social program, the other to its system of thought. Changing social conditions forced a shift from the "Gospel of Wealth" to the Social Gospel. the "Gospel of Wealth" was an appeal to rich Christians to share their wealth in philanthropy, while the Social Gospel called on ministers to take the lead themselves in eliminating social evils. The second challenge emerged from modern science, where Darwinian theory of evolution generated quite different religious responses among Christians in terms of biblical authoritarianism, Romantic liberalism, and modernism.

As a result, mainline Protestant churches gradually shifted towards Christian modernism, abandoning their emphasis on the individual salvation of the soul and laissez-faire individualism, although Christian fundamentalists resisted this tendency and sought to cling to the theological foundations of Christianity to which the denominations have arguably begun again to return.

Increasingly, the nation encountered new minority religions. According to historian R. Laurence Moore, Christian Scientists, Jehovah's Witnesses, Mormons, Pentecostals, and Roman Catholics responded to hostile comments by sensing themselves as persecuted Americans on the margins of society, which made them cling tightly to their status as full citizens.

=== African-Americans in the Baptist Tradition ===
After the Civil War, Black Baptists desiring to practice Christianity away from racial discrimination rapidly set up several separate state Baptist conventions. In 1866, Black Baptists of the South and West combined to form the Consolidated American Baptist Convention. This Convention eventually collapsed but three national conventions formed in response. In 1895 the three conventions merged to create the National Baptist Convention. It is now the largest African American religious organization in the United States. The predominantly white denominations operated numerous missions to Blacks, especially in the South. Already before the Civil War Catholics had set up churches for Blacks in Louisiana, Maryland and Kentucky.

=== The South ===
Historian Edward Ayers describes an impoverished South with a rich spiritual life:

Religious faith and language appeared everywhere in the New South. It permeated public speech as well as private emotion. For many people, religion provided the measure of politics, the power behind law and reform, the reason to reach out to the poor and exploited, a pressure to cross racial boundaries. People viewed everything from courtship to child-rearing to their own deaths in religious terms. Even those filled with doubt or disdain could not escape the images, the assumptions, the power of faith. The Baptists formed the largest grouping, for both Blacks and whites, with its loose networks of numerous small rural churches. In second place for both races came the Methodists, with a hierarchical structure at the opposite end of the spectrum from the Baptists. Smaller fundamentalist groups that grew very large in the 20th century were starting to appear. Clusters of Catholics appeared in the region's few cities, as well as southern Louisiana. Elite white Southerners, for the most part, were Episcopalians or Presbyterians. Across the region, ministers held high prestige positions, especially in the black community where they were typically political leaders as well. When the great majority of Blacks were disenfranchised after 1890, the black preachers were still allowed to vote. Revivals were regular occurrences, attracting large crowds. It was usually the already converted who attended, so the number of new converts was relatively small but new or old, they all enjoyed the preaching and the socializing. Of course no liquor was served, for the major social reform promoted by the Southerners was prohibition; It was also the major political outlet for women activists, for the suffrage movement was weak.

=== Missions to reservations ===
Starting in the colonial era, most of the Protestant denominations operated missions to Native Americans. After the Civil War, the programs were expanded and the major Western reservations were put under the control of religious denominations, largely to avoid the financial scandals and ugly relationships that had previously prevailed. In 1869, Congress created the Board of Indian Commissioners and President Ulysses Grant appointed volunteer members who were "eminent for their intelligence and philanthropy." The Grant Board was given extensive power to supervise the Bureau of Indian Affairs and "civilize" Native Americans. Grant was determined to divide Native American post appointments "up among the religious churches"; by 1872, 73 Indian agencies were divided among religious denominations. A core policy was to put the western reservations under the control of religious denominations. In 1872, of the 73 agencies assigned, the Methodists received 14 reservations; the Orthodox Quakers ten; the Presbyterians nine; the Episcopalians eight; the Catholics seven; the Hicksite Quakers six; the Baptists five; the Dutch Reformed five; the Congregationalists three; the Disciples two; Unitarians two; American Board of Commissioners for Foreign Missions one; and Lutherans one. The selection criteria were vague and critics saw the Peace Policy as violating Native American freedom of religion. Catholics wanted a bigger role and set up the Bureau of Catholic Indian Missions in 1874. The Peace Policy remained in force until 1881. Historian Cary Collins says Grant's Peace Policy failed in the Pacific Northwest chiefly because of sectarian competition and the priority placed on proselytizing by the religious denominations.

=== Catholic Church in the late 19th century ===
The main source of Catholics in the United States was the huge numbers of European immigrants of the 19th and 20th centuries, especially from Germany, Ireland, Italy, and Poland. Recently, most Catholic immigrants come from Latin America, especially from Mexico.

The Irish came to dominate the church, providing most of the bishops, college presidents and lay leaders. They strongly supported the "ultramontane" position favoring the authority of the pope.

In the latter half of the 19th century, the first attempt at standardizing discipline in the church occurred with the convocation of the Plenary Councils of Baltimore. These councils resulted in the Baltimore Catechism and the establishment of The Catholic University of America.

In the 1960s, the church went through dramatic changes, especially in the liturgy and the use of the language of the people instead of Latin. The number of priests and nuns declined sharply as few entered and many left their vocations. Since 1990, scandals involving the coverup by bishops of priests who sexually abused young men has led to massive financial payments across the country, and in Europe and the world as well.

=== 1880s–1920s in benevolent and missionary societies ===
By 1890, American Protestant churches were supporting about 1,000 overseas missionaries and their wives. Women's organizations based in local churches were especially active in motivating volunteers and raising funds. Inspired by the Social Gospel movement to increased activism, young people on college campuses and in urban centers such as the YMCA contributed to a great surge that brought the total to 5000 by 1900. From 1886 to 1926, the most active recruiting agency was the Student Volunteer Movement for Foreign Missions (SVM), which used its base on campus YMCAs to appeal to enlist over 8,000 young Protestants. The idea quickly was copied by the new World's Student Christian Federation (WSCF), with strength in Great Britain, and Europe, and even as far as Australia, India, China and Japan. Preliminary training at first focus on a deep understanding of the Bible; only later was it appreciated that effective missionaries had to understand the language and the culture. Important leaders included John Mott (1865–1955; the head of the YMCA), Robert E. Speer (1867–1947; the chief Presbysterian organizer; and Sherwood Eddy (1871–1963). Eddy, a wealthy young graduate of Yale College and Union Theological Seminary, concentrated on India. His base was the YMCA-organized Indian Student Volunteer Movement, focusing on the poor and outcasts. In 1911–31, he was secretary for Asia for the International Committee, splitting his energy between evangelistic campaigns in Asia and fund-raising in North America.

Mott promoted the YMCA across the United States and across the world. Its educational and sports programs proved highly attractive everywhere, but the response to religious proselytizing was tepid. Mott argued about China in 1910:

It is Western education that the Chinese are clamoring for, and will have. If the Church can give it to them, plus Christianity, they will take it; otherwise they will get it elsewhere, without Christianity—and that speedily. If in addition to direct evangelistic and philanthropic work in China, the Church can in the next decade trained several thousands of Christian teachers, it will be in a position to meet this unparalleled opportunity.

With wide attention focused on the anti-Western Boxer Rebellion (1899–1901), American Protestants made missions to China a high priority. They supported 500 missionaries in 1890, more than 2,000 in 1914, and 8,300 in 1920. By 1927, they opened 16 universities in China, six medical schools, and four theology schools, together with 265 middle schools and a large number of elementary schools. The number of converts was not large, but the educational influence was dramatic and long-lasting.

=== Laymen's Report of 1932 ===
World War I reduced the enthusiasm for missions. Mission leaders had strongly endorsed the war; the younger generation was dismayed amid growing doubts about the wisdom of cultural imperialism in dealing with foreign peoples. In 1930–1932, Harvard Professor William Ernest Hocking led the Commission of Appraisal, which produced the Laymen's Inquiry which recommended a shift on Christian missionary activities from evangelism to education and welfare.

=== Social Gospel ===
A powerful influence in mainline northern Protestant denominations was the Social Gospel, especially in the late 19th and early 20th centuries, with traces extending to the 21st century. The goal was to apply Christian ethics to social problems, especially issues of social justice and social evils such as economic inequality, poverty, alcoholism, crime, racial tensions, slums, unclean environment, child labor, lack of unionization, poor schools, and the dangers of war. Theologically, the Social Gospelers sought to put into practice the Lord's Prayer: "Thy kingdom come, Thy will be done on earth as it is in heaven". They typically were postmillennialist; that is, they believed the Second Coming could not happen until humankind rid itself of social evils by human effort. Social Gospel theologians rejected premillennialist theology, which held the Second Coming of Christ was imminent, and Christians should devote their energies to preparing for it rather than social issues. That perspective was strongest among fundamentalists and in the South. The Social Gospel was more popular among clergy than laity. Its leaders were predominantly associated with the liberal wing of the progressive movement, and most were theologically liberal. Important leaders included Richard T. Ely, Josiah Strong, Washington Gladden, and Walter Rauschenbusch. Many politicians came under its influence, notably William Jennings Bryan and Woodrow Wilson. The most controversial Social Gospel reform was prohibition, which was highly popular in rural areas – including the South – and unpopular in the larger cities where mainline Protestantism was weak among the electorate.

=== Resurgence and retreat of fundamentalism ===
In the 1920s, these "strident fundamentalists" devoted themselves to fighting against the teaching of evolution in the nation's schools and colleges, especially by passing state laws that affected public schools. William Bell Riley took the initiative in the 1925 Scopes Trial by bringing in famed politician William Jennings Bryan as an assistant to the local prosecutor, Bryan drew national media attention to the trial. In the half century after the Scopes Trial, fundamentalists had little success in shaping government policy, and they were generally defeated in their efforts to reshape the mainline denominations, which refused to join fundamentalist attacks on evolution. Particularly after the Scopes Trial, liberals saw a division between Christians in favor of the teaching of evolution, whom they viewed positively, and Christians against evolution, whom they viewed negatively.

Webb (1991) traces the political and legal struggles between strict creationists and Darwinists to influence the extent to which evolution would be taught as science in Arizona and California schools. After Scopes was convicted, creationists throughout the United States sought to pass similar anti-evolution laws in their states. They sought to ban the study of the theory of evolution, or at the very least, they sought to relegate evolution to the status of an unproven theory which could probably be taught along with the biblical version of creation. Educators, scientists, and other distinguished laymen believed in the theory of evolution. Later, this struggle occurred in the Southwest more frequently than it occurred in other areas of the US, and it persisted through the Sputnik era.

=== Decline in religiosity both before and during the Great Depression ===
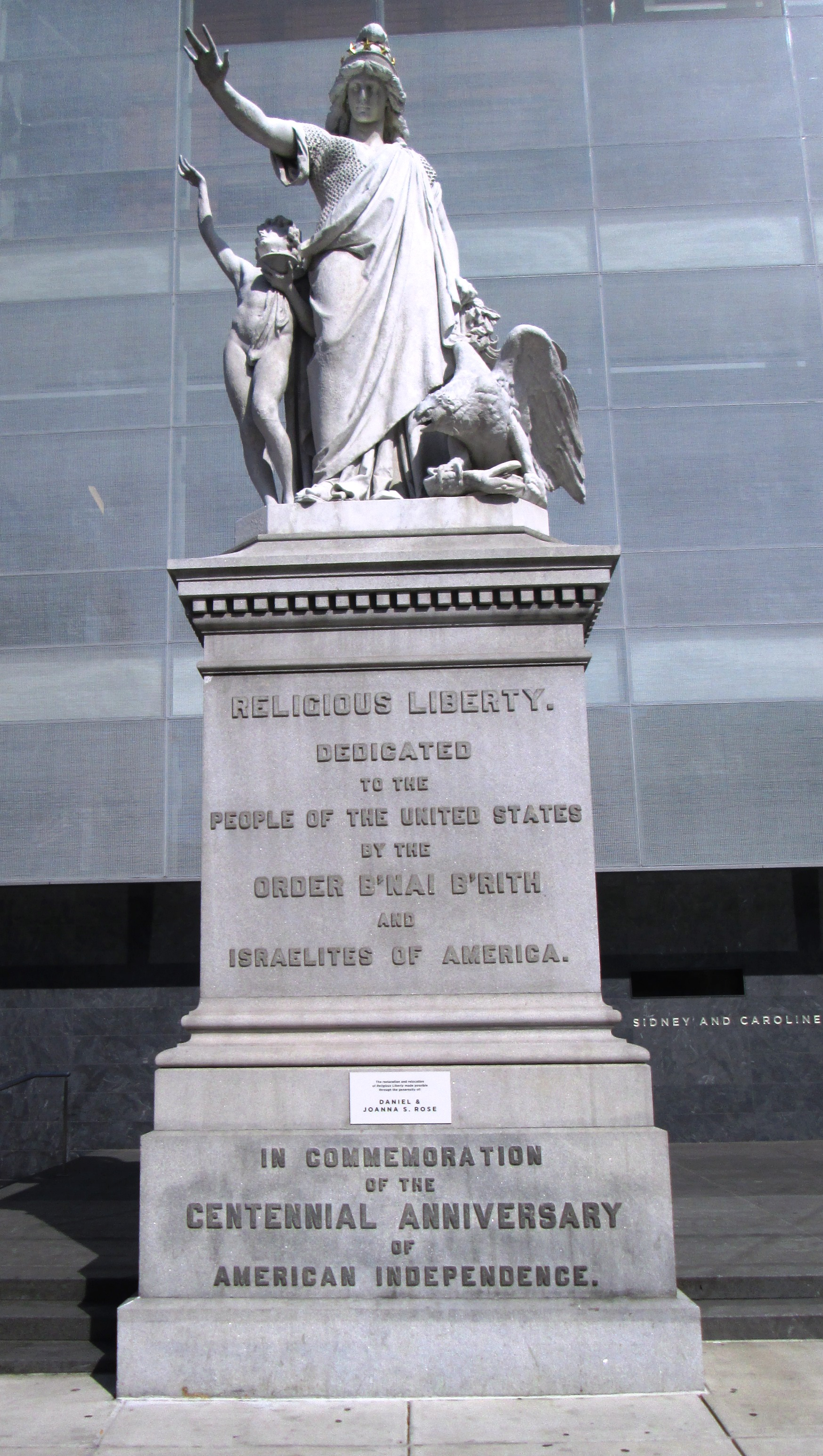
Religious Liberty, a statue by Moses Jacob Ezekiel commissioned for the 1876 Centennial Exposition and dedicated "to the people of the United States".

Robert T. Handy identifies a religious depression in the United States starting around 1925 that only grew worse during the economic depression which began in 1929. The identification of Protestantism with American culture undermined religious messages. The fundamentalist churches over-expanded and were financially troubled. The mainstream churches were well enough financed in the late 1920s, but lost their self-confidence in terms of whether their social gospel was needed in an age of prosperity, especially since the great reform of prohibition was a failure. In terms of their network of international missions, the mainstream churches realized that the missions were a success in terms of opening modern schools and hospitals but a failure in terms of conversions. The leading theorist Daniel Fleming proclaimed that the continents for Christian outreach and Christian conquest were no longer Africa and Asia, but rather, materialism, racial injustice, war and poverty. The number of missionaries from mainstream denominations began a steep decline. By contrast, the evangelical and fundamentalist churches—never wedded to the social gospel—escalated their efforts worldwide with a focus on conversion. At home the mainstream churches were forced to expand their charitable roles in 1929–31, but collapsed financially with the overwhelming magnitude of the economic disaster for ordinary Americans. Suddenly in 1932–33, the mainline churches lost one of their historic functions in distributing alms to the poor, and the national government took over that role without any religious dimension. Handy argues that the deep self-doubt the religious revivals customary in times of economic depression was absent in the 1930s. He concludes that Great Depression marked the end of the dominance of Protestantism in American life.

=== World War II ===
In the 1930s, pacifism was a very strong force in most of the Protestant churches. Only a minority of religious leaders, typified by Reinhold Niebuhr, paid serious attention to the threats to peace posed by Nazi Germany, Fascist Italy, or militaristic Japan. After the attack on Pearl Harbor in December 1941, practically all the religious denominations gave some support to the war effort, such as providing chaplains. The pacifist churches, such as the Quakers and Mennonites were small but maintained their opposition to military service. Many young members, such as Richard Nixon voluntarily joined the military. Unlike in 1917–1918, the positions were generally respected by the government, which set up non-combat civilian roles for conscientious objectors. Typically, church members sent their sons into the military without protest, accepted shortages and rationing as a war necessity, purchased war bonds, working munitions industries, and prayed intensely for safe return and for victory. Church leaders, however, were much more cautious while holding fast to the ideals of peace, justice and humanitarianism, and sometimes criticizing military policies such as the bombing of enemy cities. They sponsored 10,000 military chaplains, and set up special ministries in and around military bases, focused not only on soldiers but their young wives who often followed them. The mainstream Protestant churches supported the "Double V campaign" of the black churches to achieve victory against the enemies abroad, and victory against racism on the home front. However, there was little religious protest against the incarceration of Japanese on the West Coast or against segregation of Blacks in the services. The intense moral outrage regarding the Holocaust largely appeared after the war ended, especially after 1960. Many church leaders supported studies of postwar peace proposals, typified by John Foster Dulles, a leading Protestant layman and a leading adviser to top-level Republicans. The churches promoted strong support for European relief programs, especially through the United Nations. In one of the largest white Protestant denominations, the Southern Baptists, there was a new awareness of international affairs, a highly negative response to the axis dictatorships, and also a growing fear of the power of the Catholic Church in American society. The military brought strangers together who discovered a common Americanism, leading to a sharp decline in anti-Catholicism among veterans. In the general population, public opinion polls indicate that religious and ethnic prejudice were less prevalent after 1945, though some degree of anti-Catholic bias, anti-Semitism, and other discrimination continued.

=== School prayer and the Supreme Court since 1947 ===
The phrase "separation of church and state" became a definitive part of Establishment Clause jurisprudence in Everson v. Board of Education (1947), a case that dealt with a state law that allowed government funds for transportation to religious schools. While the ruling upheld the state law allowing taxpayer funding of transportation to religious schools as constitutional, Everson was also the first case to hold the Establishment Clause applicable to the state legislatures as well as Congress, based upon the due process clause of the Fourteenth Amendment.

In 1949, Bible reading was a part of routine in the public schools of at least thirty-seven states. In twelve of these states, Bible reading was legally required by state laws; 11 states passed these laws after 1913. In 1960, 42 percent of school districts nationwide tolerated or required Bible reading, and 50 percent reported some form of homeroom daily devotional exercise.

Since 1962, the Supreme Court has repeatedly ruled that prayers organized by public school officials schools are unconstitutional. Students are allowed to pray privately, and to join religious clubs after school hours. Colleges, universities, and private schools are not affected by the Supreme Court rulings. Reactions to Engel and Abington were widely negative, with over 150 constitutional amendments submitted to reverse the policy. None passed Congress. The Supreme Court has also ruled that so-called "voluntary" school prayers are also unconstitutional, because they force some students to be outsiders to the main group, and because they subject dissenters to intense peer group pressure. In Lee v. Weisman (1992), the Supreme Court held that:

the State may not place the student dissenter in the dilemma of participating or protesting. Since adolescents are often susceptible to peer pressure, especially in matters of social convention, the State may no more use social pressure to enforce orthodoxy than it may use direct means. The embarrassment and intrusion of the religious exercise cannot be refuted by arguing that the prayers are of a de minimis character, since that is an affront to ...those for whom the prayers have meaning, and since any intrusion was both real and a violation of the objectors' rights.

In 1962, the Supreme Court extended this analysis to the issue of prayer in public schools. In Engel v. Vitale (1962), the Court determined it unconstitutional for state officials to compose an official school prayer and require its recitation in public schools, even when it is non-denominational and students may excuse themselves from participation. As such, any teacher, faculty, or student can pray in school, in accordance with their own religion. However, they may not lead such prayers in class, or in other "official" school settings such as assemblies or programs.

Currently, the Supreme Court applies a three-pronged test to determine whether legislation comports with the Establishment Clause, known as the "Lemon Test". First, the legislature must have adopted the law with a neutral or non-religious purpose. Second, the statute's principal or primary effect must be one that neither advances nor inhibits religion. Third, the statute must not result in an excessive entanglement of government with religion.

=== Debate over America as a "Christian nation" ===
Since the late 19th century, some right-wing Christians have argued that the United States of America is essentially Christian in origin. They preach American exceptionalism, oppose liberal scholars, and emphasize the Christian identity of many Founding Fathers. Critics argue that many of these Christian founders actually supported the separation of church and state and would not support the notion that they were trying to found a Christian nation.

In Church of the Holy Trinity v. United States, a Supreme Court decision in 1892, Justice David Josiah Brewer wrote that America was "a Christian nation". He later wrote and lectured widely on the topic, stressing that "Christian nation" was an informal designation and not a legal standard: "[In] American life, as expressed by its laws, its business, its customs, and its society, we find everywhere a clear recognition of the same truth… this is a religious nation".

== Denominations and sects founded in the US ==
=== Restorationism ===
Restorationism refers to the belief that a purer form of Christianity should be restored using the early church as a model. In many cases, restorationist groups believed that contemporary Christianity, in all its forms, had deviated from the true, original Christianity, which they then attempted to "Reconstruct", often using the Book of Acts as a "guidebook" of sorts. Restorationists do not usually describe themselves as "reforming" a Christian church continuously existing from the time of Jesus, but as restoring the Church that they believe was lost at some point. "Restorationism" is often used to describe the Stone-Campbell Restoration Movement. The term "Restorationist" is also used to describe the Latter Day Saints and the Jehovah's Witness Movement.

=== Latter Day Saint movement ===
The origins of another distinctive religious group, the Latter Day Saint movement—also widely known as Latter Day Saints or Mormons—arose in the early 19th century. It appeared in an intensely religious area of western New York called the burned-over district, because it had been "scorched" by so many revivals. Smith said he had a series of visions, revelations from God and visitations from angelic messengers, providing him with ongoing instructions as prophet, seer, and revelator and a restorer of the original and primary doctrines of early Christianity. After publishing the Book of Mormon—which he said he translated by divine power from a record of ancient American prophets recorded on golden plates—Smith organized the Church of Christ in 1830. He set up a theocracy at Nauvoo Illinois, and ran for president of the United States in 1844. His top aide Brigham Young campaigned for Smith saying, "He it is that God of Heaven designs to save this nation from destruction and preserve the Constitution."

Latter Day Saints beliefs in theocracy and polygamy alienated many. Anti-Mormon propaganda was also common, as were violent attacks. The Latter Day Saints were driven out of state after state. Smith was assassinated in 1844 and Brigham Young led the Mormon Exodus from the United States to Mexican territory in Utah in 1847. They settled the Mormon Corridor. The United States acquired permanent control of this area in 1848 and rejected the Latter-day Saints' 1849 State of Deseret proposal for self-governance, instead establishing the Utah Territory in 1850. Conflicts between Latter-day Saints and territorial federal appointees flared, included the Runaway Officials of 1851; this eventually led to the small-scale Utah War of 1857–1858, after which Utah remained occupied by Federal troops until 1861.

Congress passed the Morrill Anti-Bigamy Act of 1862 to curb the Mormon practice of polygamy in the territory, but President Abraham Lincoln did not enforce this law; instead Lincoln gave Brigham Young tacit permission to ignore the act in exchange for not becoming involved with the American Civil War.

Postwar efforts to enforce polygamy bans were limited until the 1882 Edmunds Act, which allowed for convictions of unlawful cohabitation, which was much easier to prosecute. This law also revoked polygamists' right to vote, made them ineligible for jury service, and prohibited them from holding political office. The subsequent 1887 Edmunds–Tucker Act disincorporated the LDS Church and confiscated church assets. It also: required an anti-polygamy oath for prospective voters, jurors and public officials; mandated civil marriage licenses; disallowed spousal privilege to not testify in polygamy cases; disenfranchised women; replaced local judges with federally appointed judges; and removed local control of schools. After a 1890 Supreme Court ruling found the Edmunds–Tucker Act constitutional, and with most church leadership either in hiding or imprisoned, the church released the 1890 Manifesto which advised church members against entering legally prohibited marriages. Dissenters moved to Canada or Mormon colonies in Mexico, or into hiding in remote areas. With the polygamy issue resolved, church leaders were pardoned or had their sentences reduced, assets were restored to the church, and Utah was eventually granted statehood in 1896. After the Reed Smoot hearings began in 1904, a Second Manifesto was issued which specified that anyone entering into or solemnizing polygamous marriages would be excommunicated, and clarified that polygamy restrictions applied everywhere, and not just in the United States.

Thanks to worldwide missionary work, the church grew from 7.7 million members worldwide in 1989 to 14 million in 2010.

=== Jehovah's Witnesses ===
Jehovah's Witnesses comprise a fast-growing denomination that has kept itself separate from other Christian denominations. It began in 1872 with Charles Taze Russell, but experienced a major schism in 1917 as Joseph Franklin Rutherford began his presidency. Rutherford gave new direction to the movement and renamed the movement "Jehovah's witnesses" in 1931. The period from 1925 to 1933 saw many significant changes in doctrine. Attendance at their yearly Memorial dropped from a high of 90,434 in 1925 to 63,146 in 1935. Since 1950, growth has been very rapid.

During World War II, Jehovah's Witnesses experienced mob attacks in America and were temporarily banned in Canada and Australia because of their lack of support for the war effort. They won significant Supreme Court victories involving the rights of free speech and religion that have had a great impact on legal interpretation of these rights for others. In 1943, the United States Supreme Court ruled in West Virginia State Board of Education vs. Barnette that school children of Jehovah's Witnesses could not be compelled to salute the flag.

=== Church of Christ, Scientist ===
The Church of Christ, Scientist was founded in 1879, in Boston by Mary Baker Eddy. The religion’s two central texts are the Bible and Eddy’s book, Science and Health with Key to the Scriptures, which offers a unique interpretation of Christian faith. Christian Science teaches that the reality of God denies the reality of sin, sickness, death and the material world. Accounts of miraculous healing are common within the church, and adherents often refuse traditional medical treatments. Legal troubles sometimes result when they forbid medical treatment of their children.

The Church is unique among American denominations in several ways. It is highly centralized, with all the local churches merely branches of the mother church in Boston. There are no ministers, but there are practitioners who are integral to the movement. The practitioners operate local businesses that claim to help members heal their illnesses by the power of the mind. They depend for their clientele on the approval of the Church. Starting in the late 19th century the Church rapidly lost membership, although it does not publish statistics. Its flagship newspaper Christian Science Monitor lost most of its subscribers and dropped its paper version to become an online source.

=== Some other denominations founded in the US ===
- Adventism - began as an inter-denominational movement. Its most vocal leader was William Miller, who in the 1830s in New York became convinced of an imminent Second Coming of Jesus.
- Churches of Christ/Disciples of Christ - a restoration movement with no governing body. The Restoration Movement solidified as a historical phenomenon in 1832 when restorationists from two major movements championed by Barton W. Stone and Alexander Campbell merged (referred to as the "Stone-Campbell Movement").
- Episcopal Church - founded as an offshoot of the Church of England; now the United States branch of the Anglican Communion.
- National Baptist Convention - the largest African American religious organization in the United States and the second largest Baptist denomination in the world.
- Pentecostalism - movement that emphasizes the role of the Holy Spirit, finds its historic roots in the Azusa Street Revival in Los Angeles, California, from 1904 to 1906, sparked by Charles Parham
- Reconstructionist Judaism
- Southern Baptist Convention, the largest Baptist group in the world and the largest Protestant denomination in the United States. In 1995, it renounced its 1845 origins in the defense of slavery and racial superiority.
- Unitarian Universalism - a theologically liberal religious movement founded in 1961 from the union of the well established Unitarian and Universalist churches.
- United Church of Christ - formed in 1957 as a united and uniting church from a merger of the Congregational Christian Church and Evangelical and Reformed Church. Congregations participating in the merger descended from Congregationalist churches of New England, German Lutheran and Reformed Churches largely from the Midwest, and various of Campbellite, Christian Connexion and "Christian" churches.
- Cumberland Presbyterian Church - founded in 1810 in Dickson County, Tennessee by Samuel McAdow, Finis Ewing, and Samuel King.

== Eastern Orthodoxy ==
Eastern Orthodoxy reached to the North American continent with the founding of Russian America in the 1740s. After Russia sold Alaska in 1867 some of the missionaries remained.

In the 21st century Eastern Orthodox Christianity represents numerous adherents, religious communities, institutions and organizations. Most members are Russian Americans, Turkish Americans, Greek Americans, Arab Americans, Ukrainian Americans, Albanian Americans, Macedonian Americans, Romanian Americans, Bulgarian Americans and Serbian Americans, with some from other Eastern European countries.

== Judaism ==
The history of the Jews in the United States comprises a theological dimension, with a three-way division into Orthodox, Conservative, and Reform. In social terms the Jewish ethnic community began with small groups of merchants in colonial ports such as New York City and Charleston. In the mid- and late-19th century well-educated German Jews arrived and settled in towns and cities across the United States, especially as dry goods merchants. From 1880 to 1924 large numbers of Yiddish-speaking Jews arrived from Eastern Europe, settling in New York City and other large cities. After 1926 numbers came as refugees from Europe; after 1980 many came from the Soviet Union, and there has been a flow from Israel. By the year 1900 the 1.5 million Jews residing in the United States were the third most of any nation, behind Russia and Austria-Hungary. The proportion of the population has been about 2% to 3% since 1900, and in the 21st century Jews were widely diffused in major metropolitan areas around New York or the Northeastern United States, and especially in South Florida and California.

== Islam ==
The first migration of Muslims to America is estimated to be started since 1820 (or 1860), and these Muslims were from Syria, Lebanon, Albania, Macedonia, Turkey, and other regions. And from that time on, Islam became more widely known in America gradually. On the other hand, the record of the presence of the first Muslim person in America was mentioned in 1520 (by a Moroccan Muslim).

== See also ==
- Ethnocultural politics in the United States
- Freedom of religion in the United States
- First Amendment to the United States Constitution
- First Great Awakening
- Fundamentalist Christianity
- Historical religious demographics of the United States
- Historiography of religion
- Religion in the United States
- Religious discrimination in the United States
- Second Great Awakening
- Separation of church and state in the United States
- Third Great Awakening
