= Historiography of religion =

The historiography of religion is how historians have studied religion in terms of themes, sources and conflicting ideas. Historians typically focus on one particular topic in the overall history of religions in terms of geographical area or of theological tradition.

Historians for centuries focused on the theological developments of their own religious heritage. Social scientists in the 19th century took a strong interest in "primitive" and comparative religion. In the 20th century, the field focused mostly on theology and church organization and development. Since the 1970s the social history approach to religious behavior and belief has become important, and it has been emphasized that in contrast to religious discourse (about things eternal and transcendental), for the scholarship of the history of religion (being about things human and temporal), reverence is a religious, and not a scholarly virtue.

== Reformation ==
Margaret Jacob argues that there has been a dramatic shift in the historiography of the Reformation. Until the 1960s, historians focused their attention largely on 16th-century theologians such as Martin Luther, John Calvin, and Huldrych Zwingli. Their ideas were studied in depth. However, the rise of the new social history in the 1960s look at history from the bottom up, not from the top down. Historians began to concentrate on the values, beliefs and behavior of the people at large. She finds, "in contemporary scholarship, the Reformation is now seen as a vast cultural upheaval, a social and popular movement, textured and rich because of its diversity".

== 1700–1900 ==
New approaches to the history of Christianity were introduced by Leopold von Ranke (1795–1886) and Philip Schaff (1819–1892). They emphasized the need for more neutrality, with the goal of understanding history as it actually happened, rather than promoting or defending ones theological heritage. Von Ranke in 1843 finished his six‐volume German History in the Epoch of the Reformation then turned to a multivolume History of the Popes during the Last Four Centuries. Schaff, deeply schooled in the German tradition, relocated to the United States in 1844. His History of the Christian Church (7 vols., 1858–1890), set new standards for the American study of ecclesiastical history. He demonstrated how to integrate liturgical developments. He also introduced European scholars to American religion, arguing that American sectarianism, with all its faults, was preferable to European church-statism.

=== Pietism and benevolence ===
Pietism was originated in 18th-century Germany and was emulated in neighboring countries. It had a major impact in England and North America, where it affected the Methodist movement and a series of revival outbursts known as the Great Awakening in the United States. It involved an intense internal focus on sin and salvation through Christ, and in the form of evangelicalism, remains a powerful force in Protestantism well into the 21st century. Pietism emphasize the value of revivals, leading to the born-again experience, and inspired its followers to set high moralistic standards for public behavior, as in such areas as opposition to alcohol and slavery.

Historians have explored the impact of the new religious sentiments of the 18th and 19th century on the organizational behavior of laymen. Protestants sponsored voluntary charitable and religious societies, including overseas missions throughout the empire, setting up Sunday schools, founding charity schools, distributing Bibles and devotional literature, creating and emphasizing hymns and communal singing, and setting up revivals. A major result was the establishment of an international battle against slavery as an affront to Protestant morality.

=== Comparative studies ===
Social scientists in the 19th century took a strong interest in comparative and "primitive" religion through the work of Max Müller, Edward Burnett Tylor, William Robertson Smith, James George Frazer, Émile Durkheim, Max Weber, and Rudolf Otto.

== 20th century ==
Hartmut Lehmann argues that four basic themes dominated the history of Christianity during the 20th century: the rise of "political religions", drastic technological changes, progressive secularization, and the impressive growth of Christian communities in the Southern Hemisphere.

=== Secularization ===
Secularization, the steady decline in religious activity in historically Protestant countries of Europe, has been an important field of study.

=== Missions and expansion ===
Much recent research is focused on the expansion of Christianity throughout the developing world. Protestant and Catholic religions, starting their strongholds in European colonial powers, propagated throughout the third world in the 20th century – especially in Africa. For example, Nigeria has far more Anglicans than does Great Britain. Missionaries, especially from the United States, promoted Mormonism, Jehovah's Witnesses, Seventh-day Adventists, and holiness and Pentecostal denominations to highly receptive audiences.

== Islam ==
The historiography of Islam grew slowly in the 20th century, and, since the 1980s, has become a major project for scholars.

== See also ==
- Historiography
- Historiography of early Islam
- History of religion in the United States
- Religious studies
- Social history
