= Modern history of Germany =

Articles on the modern history of Germany:

- Germany in the early modern period
- 18th-century history of Germany
- 19th-century history of Germany
- German Confederation
- German Empire
- Weimar Republic
- Third Reich
- History of Germany (1945–90)
- History of Germany since 1990
