= Scattamek =

18th century Native American religious leader

Scattamek was a Lenape living in the Ohio Country during the 18th century. He was a religious leader later termed a prophet who continued and built on the teachings of Neolin. Their teachings influenced many of the surrounding tribes, including the Shawnee, the Miami, and Wea. Scattamek is known to have been teaching during the 1770s. The teachings were largely based on earlier traditions, but their teachings focused on the need to return to the tribe's ancestral ways, giving up European dress, liquor, and firearms. They blamed their misfortunes on the gods' anger with their adoption of European customs. Scattamek had particular influence on Tenskwatawa, who led a nativist revival during the early 19th century that catalyzed tribal support for Tecumseh's War during the 1810s.
