= 18th-century history of Germany =

From the 1680s to 1789, Germany comprised many small territories which were parts of the Holy Roman Empire of the German Nation. Prussia finally emerged as dominant. Meanwhile, the states developed a classical culture that found its greatest expression in the Enlightenment, with world class leaders such as philosophers Leibniz and Kant, writers such as Goethe and Schiller, and musicians Bach and Beethoven.

== Military and diplomatic history ==
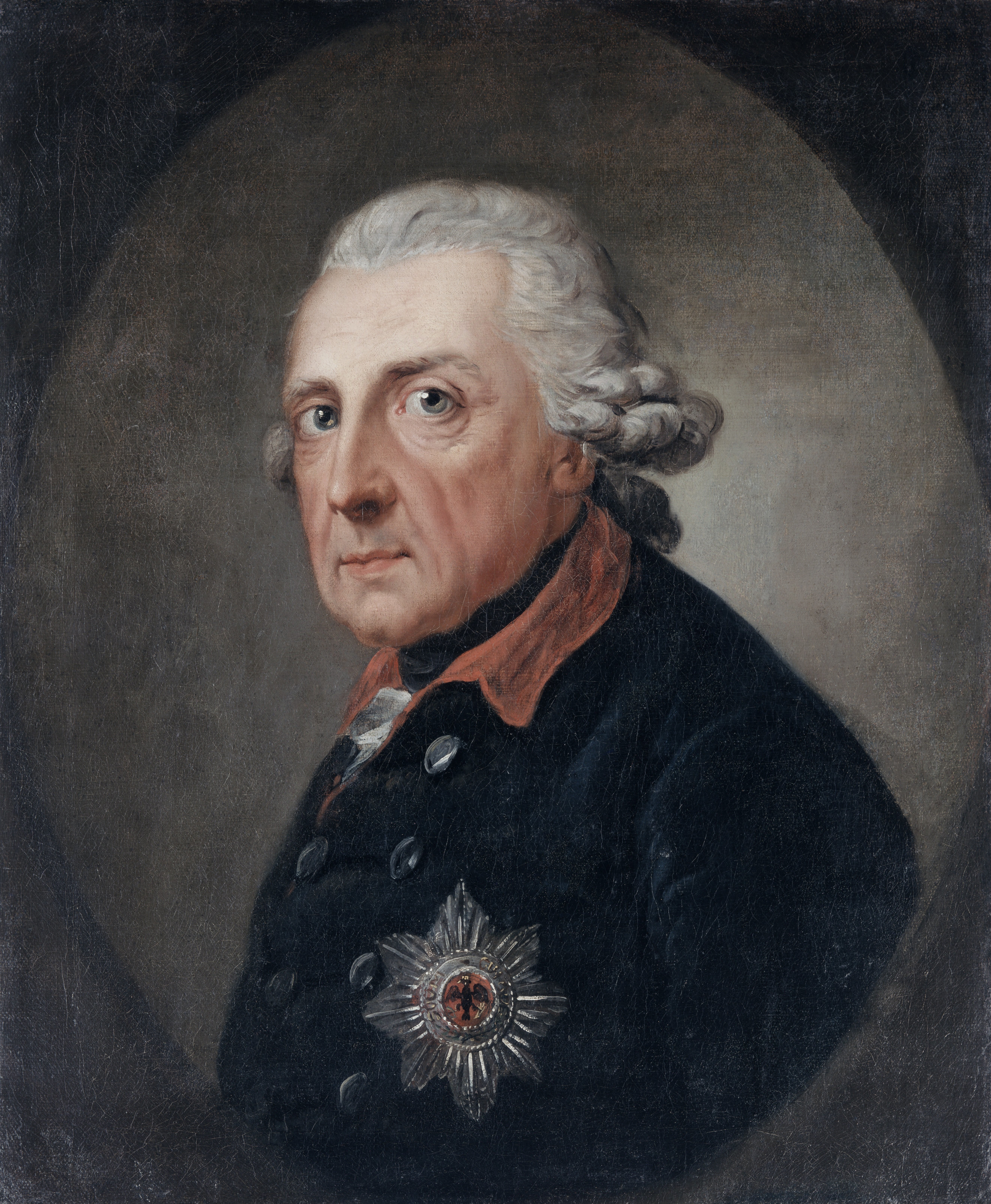
Frederick II, the Great, of Prussia (1712–1786)

Germany, or more exactly the old Holy Roman Empire, in the 18th century entered a period of decline that would finally lead to the dissolution of the Empire during the Napoleonic Wars. Since the Peace of Westphalia in 1648, the Empire had been fragmented into numerous independent states (Kleinstaaterei). In 1701, Elector Frederick of Brandenburg was crowned "King in Prussia". From 1713 to 1740, King Frederick William I, also known as the "Soldier King", established a highly centralized state.

The term German dualism describes the long conflict between the two largest German states Austria and Prussia from 1740 to 1866 when Prussia finally forced Austria out of the German Confederation.

The Kingdom of Prussia emerged as the leading state of the Empire. Frederick III (1688–1701) became King Frederick I of Prussia in 1701. Since there was only one King of the Germans within the Empire, Frederick gained the assent of Emperor Leopold I (in return for alliance against France in the War of the Spanish Succession) to his adoption (January 1701) of the title of "King in Prussia" based on his non-imperial territories. The title came into general acceptance with the Treaty of Utrecht (1713).

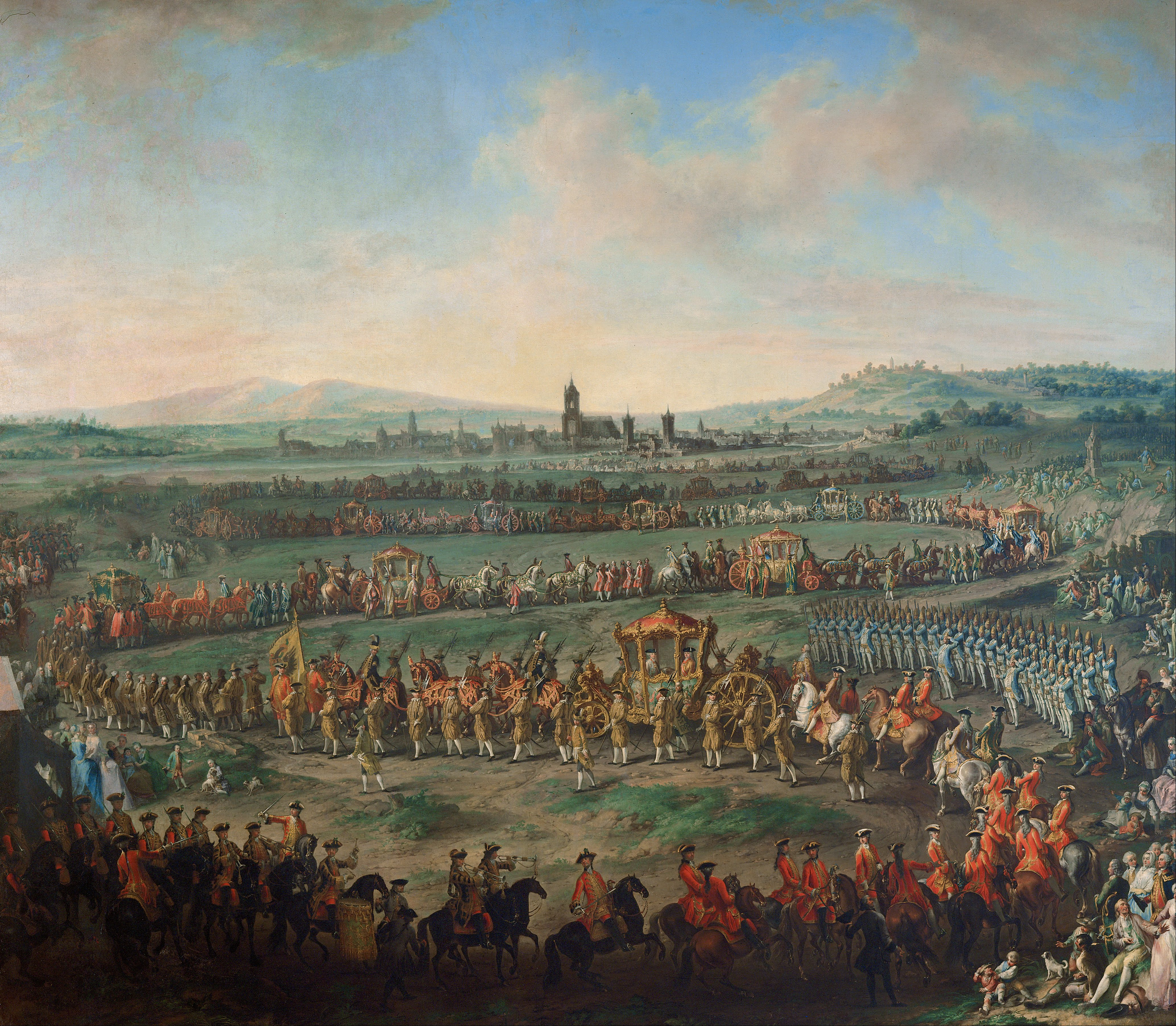
Joseph II on his way to Frankfurt for his coronation as King of the Romans

Sweden's defeat by Russia, Saxony, Poland, Denmark–Norway, Hanover, and Prussia in the Great Northern War (1700–21) marked the end of significant Swedish power on the southern shores of the Baltic Sea. In the Prusso–Swedish Treaty of Stockholm (January 1720), Prussia regained Stettin (Szczecin) and other parts of Sweden's holding in Pomerania. The Hohenzollerns of Brandenburg had held the reversion to the Duchy of Pomerania since 1472. During this time, the trends set in motion by the Great Elector reached their culmination, as the Junkers, the landed aristocracy, were welded to the Prussian Army.

In 1740, King Frederick II (Frederick the Great) came to the throne. Using the pretext of a 1537 treaty (vetoed by Emperor Ferdinand I), by which parts of Silesia were to pass to Brandenburg after the extinction of its ruling Piast dynasty, Frederick invaded Silesia, thereby beginning the War of the Austrian Succession (1740–48). In 1744, Frederick invaded again to forestall reprisals and to claim, this time, the province of Bohemia. He failed, but French pressure on Austria's ally Great Britain led to a series of treaties and compromises, culminating in the 1748 Treaty of Aix-la-Chapelle that restored peace and left Prussia in possession of most of Silesia. When Frederick preemptively invaded Saxony and Bohemia over the course of a few months in 1756–57, he initiated the Seven Years' War. This war was a desperate struggle for the Prussian Army, and the fact that it managed to fight much of Europe to a draw bears witness to Frederick's military skills. The situation became progressively grimmer until the death of Empress Elizabeth of Russia (the miracle of the House of Brandenburg). The accession of the Prussophile Peter III relieved the pressure on the eastern front. Defeating the Austrian army at the Battle of Burkersdorf and relying on continuing British success against France in the war's colonial theatres, Prussia was finally able to force a status quo ante bellum on the continent. This result confirmed Prussia's major role within the German states and established the country as a European great power. This gave the start to the rivalry between Prussia and Austria for the leadership of Germany, referred to as German dualism.

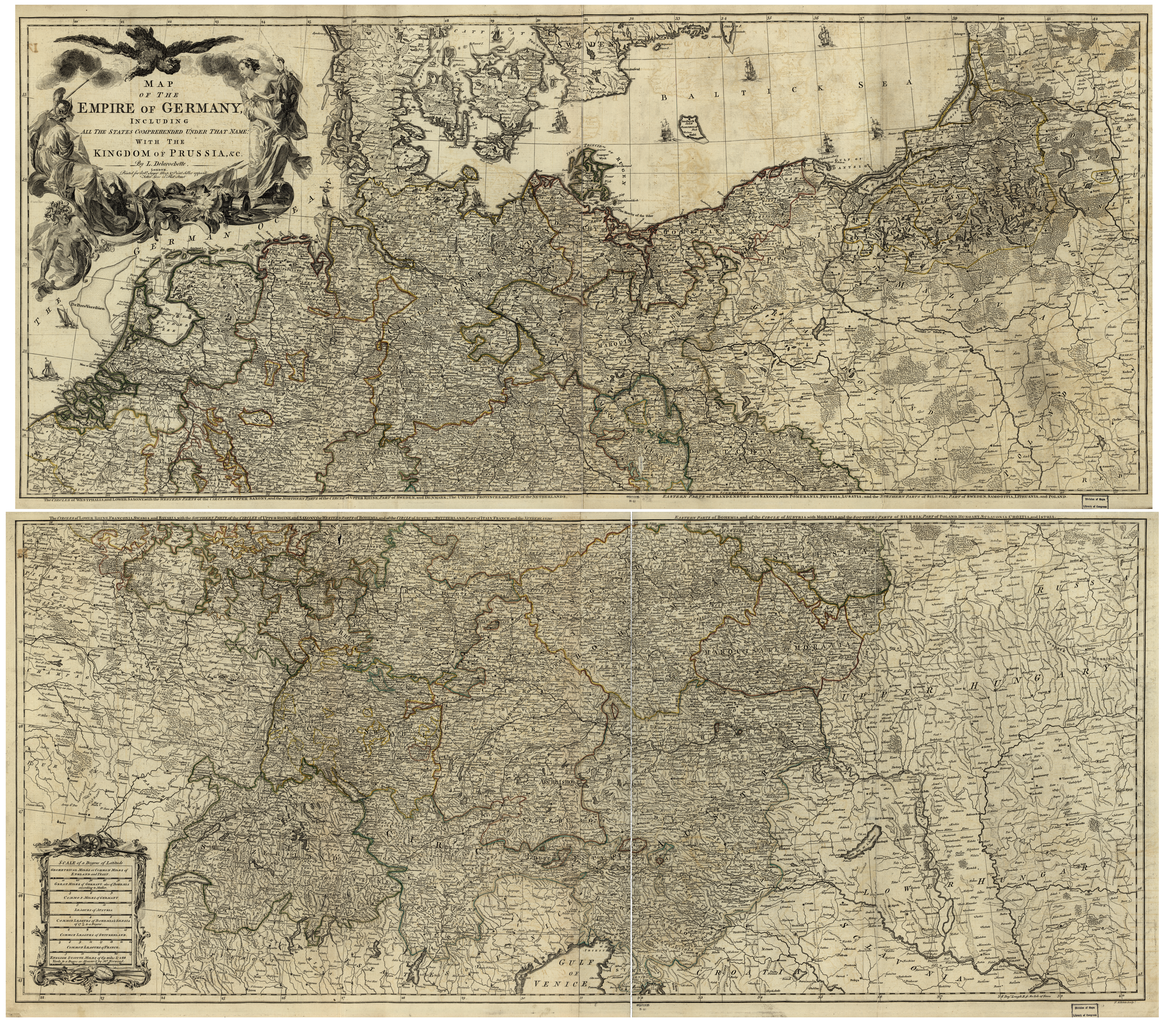
A map of by Louis Delarochette, titled Map of the Empire of Germany: Including All the States Comprehended Under that Name with the Kingdom of Prussia, 1782 CE

From 1763, against resistance from the nobility and citizenry, an "enlightened absolutism" was established in Prussia and Austria, according to which the ruler was to be "the first servant of the state". The economy developed and legal reforms were undertaken, including the abolition of torture and the improvement in the status of Jews; the emancipation of the peasants began. Education was promoted.

In 1772–95, Prussia took part in the partitions of Poland, occupying western territories of the Polish–Lithuanian Commonwealth, which led to centuries of Polish resistance against German rule and persecution. To the east and south of Prussia, the Polish–Lithuanian Commonwealth had gradually weakened during the 18th century. Frederick took part in the first of the partitions of Poland, between Russia, Prussia, and Austria in 1772. The Kingdom of Prussia annexed most of the Polish province of Royal Prussia, including Warmia; the annexed land was organized the following year into the Province of West Prussia. The new territory connected East Prussia (the territory previously known as the Duchy of Prussia) with Pomerania, uniting the kingdom's eastern territories. After Frederick died in 1786, his nephew Fredrick William II continued the partitions, gaining a large part of western Poland in 1793.

In 1795, the Kingdom of Poland ceased to exist and a large area (including Warsaw) to the south of East Prussia became part of Prussia. These new territories were organized into the Provinces of New Silesia, South Prussia, and New East Prussia.

The French Revolution sparked a new war between France and several of its Eastern neighbors, including Prussia and Austria. Following the Peace of Basel in 1795 with Prussia, the west bank of the Rhine was ceded to France.

Napoleon I of France relaunched the war against the Empire. In 1803, under the "Reichsdeputationshauptschluss" (a resolution of a committee of the Eternal Imperial Diet meeting in Regensburg), he abolished almost all the ecclesiastical and the smaller secular states and most of the imperial free cities. New medium-sized states were established in south-western Germany. In turn, Prussia gained territory in north-western Germany.

The Holy Roman Empire was formally dissolved on 6 August 1806 when the last Holy Roman Emperor Francis II (from 1804, Emperor Francis I of Austria) resigned. Francis II's family continued to be called Austrian emperors until 1918. In 1806, the Confederation of the Rhine was established under Napoleon's protection.

== Politics ==
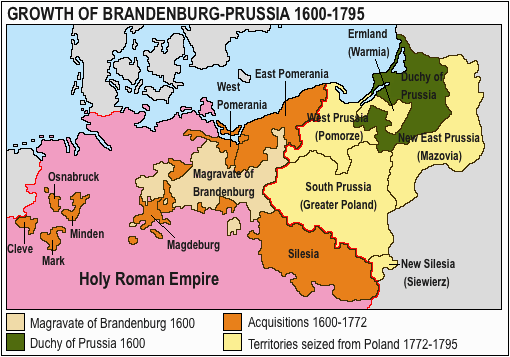
After 1763, Prussia became a European great power. The rivalry between Prussia and Austria for the leadership of Germany began

From 1640, Brandenburg-Prussia had started to rise under the Great Elector, Frederick William. The Peace of Westphalia in 1648 strengthened it even further, through the acquisition of East Pomerania. From 1713 to 1740, King Frederick William I, also known as the "Soldier King", established a highly centralized, militarized state with a heavily rural population of about three million (compared to the nine million in Austria).

In terms of the boundaries of 1914, Germany in 1700 had a population of 16 million, increasing slightly to 17 million by 1750, and growing more rapidly to 24 million by 1800. Wars continued, but they were no longer so devastating to the civilian population; famines and major epidemics did not occur, but increased agricultural productivity led to a higher birth rate, and a lower death rate.

In the War of the Austrian Succession (1740–48) Maria Theresa fought successfully for recognition of her succession to the throne. But in the Silesian Wars and in the Seven Years' War she had to cede 95 percent of Silesia to Frederick II, the Great, of Prussia. After the Peace of Hubertsburg in 1763 between Austria, Prussia and Saxony, Prussia became a European great power. This gave the start to the rivalry between Prussia and Austria for the leadership of Germany.

From 1763, against resistance from the nobility and citizenry, an "enlightened absolutism" was established in Prussia and Austria, according to which the ruler governed according to the best precepts of the philosophers. The economies developed and legal reforms were undertaken, including the abolition of torture and the improvement in the status of Jews. Emancipation of the peasants slowly began. Compulsory education was instituted.

In 1772–1795 Prussia and Austria took part in the partitions of Poland. Prussia occupied the western territories of the former Polish–Lithuanian Commonwealth that surrounded existing Prussian holdings, while Austria took the territory of Galicia further south. This occupation led to centuries of Polish resistance against Germanization.

== Smaller states ==
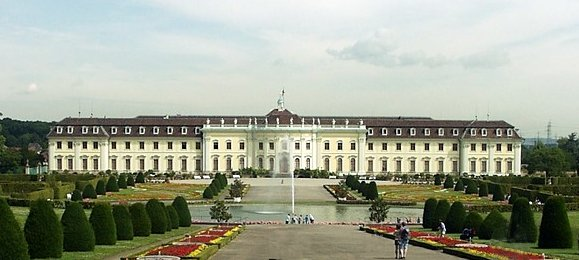
Ludwigsburg Palace in Württemberg

To the west of Austria and Prussia stood the remaining, major, part of Germany. The existence of the two big powers precluded a serious reform of the confederate structure of Germany; but reform of the individual state governments and administrations was not excluded. The general picture was as varied as the political map of the Holy Roman Empire, and it is difficult to generalise. But the impression prevails that, overall, after 1750 and especially after 1770, the general situation of the middle classes improved slightly, both economically and politically. Reforms were carried in a number of large and small states. There were some profligate, vicious and dull-witted rulers, but there were also some outstanding personalities. The bureaucrats, if often corrupt, were more competent and better educated than before. Saxony remained in the vanguard of German cultural activities, and its commercial and industrial activities remained considerable; but politically, it was outclassed by its neighbor Brandenburg-Prussia. Bavaria was especially unfortunate; it was a rural land with very heavy debts and few growth centers. In Württemberg the duke lavished funds on palaces, mistresses, great celebrations, and hunting expeditions. Among the smaller princes, many offensive characters could be found, but also many of outstanding figures, such as Duke William Ferdinand of Brunswick and Margrave Karl Friedrich of Baden. Under the rule of Karl Friedrich, an enthusiast for The Enlightenment, Baden enjoyed some of the best governments of the smaller states. Serfdom was abolished in 1783, although this was done primarily to avert peasant unrest and the flight of unfree Baden peasants to neighboring Breisgau after Joseph II abolished serfdom in that Austrian province in 1781.

A large part of Germany still lived under the rule of bishops. Conditions in these ecclesiastical principalities were no less variegated than those of the secular states. All the bishops were scions of the ruling dynasties or the high aristocracy and they considered themselves political rulers who lived and acted in the style of the contemporary secular court society. Their sense of responsibility and their capacity for the administration of their territories also varied greatly. However, even at their best, they could not achieve the continuity of government that some dynastic states began to acquire.

In Hesse-Kassel, the Landgrave Frederick II ruled from 1760 to 1785 as an enlightened despot, and raised money by hiring soldiers (called "Hessians") to Great Britain to help fight the American Revolutionary War. He combined Enlightenment ideas with Christian values, cameralist plans for central control of the economy, and a militaristic approach to diplomacy.

Hanover did not have to support a lavish court: its rulers were also kings of England and resided in London. George III, elector (ruler) from 1760 to 1820, never once visited Hanover. The local nobility who ran the country opened the University of Göttingen in 1737; it soon became a world-class intellectual center.

== Society ==
=== Nobility ===
In a heavily agrarian society, land ownership played a central role. Germany's nobles, especially those in the East – called Junkers –dominated not only the localities, but also the Prussian court, and especially the Prussian army. Increasingly after 1815, a centralized Prussian government based in Berlin took over the powers of the nobles, which in terms of control over the peasantry had been almost absolute. To help the nobility avoid indebtedness, Berlin set up a credit institution to provide capital loans in 1809, and extended the loan network to peasants in 1849. When the German Empire was established in 1871, the Junker nobility controlled the army and the Navy, the bureaucracy, and the royal court; they generally set governmental policies.

=== Peasants and rural life ===
"Peasants in a Tavern" by Adriaen van Ostade (c. 1635), at the Alte Pinakothek, Munich

Peasants continued to center their lives on the village, where they were members of a corporate body and helped manage the community resources and monitor the community life. In the East, they were serfs who were bound permanently to parcels of land. In most of Germany, farming was undertaken by tenant farmers who paid rents and carried out obligatory services to the landlord, who was typically a nobleman. Peasant leaders supervised the fields and ditches and grazing rights, maintained public order and morals, and supported a village court which handled minor offenses. Within the family the patriarch made all the decisions, and tried to arrange advantageous marriages for his children. Much of the villages' communal life centered around church services and holy days. In Prussia, the peasants drew lots to choose conscripts required by the army. The noblemen handled external relationships and politics for the villages under their control, and were not typically involved in daily activities or decisions.

In German history the emancipation of the serfs came between 1770 and 1830, with the nobility in Schleswig being the first to agree to do so in 1797, followed by the signing of the royal and political leaders of Denmark and Germany in 1804. The peasants, no longer serfs, could own their land, buy and sell it, and move about freely. The nobles approved; for now they could buy land owned by the peasants. The chief reformer was Baron vom Stein(1757–1831), who was influenced by The Enlightenment, especially the free market ideas of Adam Smith. The end of serfdom raised the personal legal status of the peasantry. A bank was set up so that landowner could borrow government money to buy land from peasants (the peasants were not allowed to use it to borrow money to buy land until 1850). The result was that the large landowners obtained larger estates, and many peasants became landless tenants, or moved to the cities or to America. The other German states imitated Prussia after 1815. In sharp contrast to the violent events of the French Revolution, Germany handled land reform peacefully. In Schleswig the peasants, who had been influenced by the Enlightenment, played an active role; elsewhere they were largely passive. Indeed, for most peasants, customs and traditions continued largely unchanged, including the old habits of deference to the nobles whose legal authority over the villagers remained quite strong. Although the peasants were no longer tied to the land, the old paternalistic relationship in East Prussia lasted into the 20th century.

The agrarian reforms in northwestern Germany in 1770–1870 were driven by progressive governments and local elites. They abolished feudal obligations and divided collectively owned common land into private parcels; and thus created a more efficient market-oriented rural economy; resulting in higher productivity and population growth. It strengthened the traditional social order because wealthy peasants obtained most of the former common land, while the rural proletariat was left without land; many left for the cities or America. Meanwhile, the division of the common land served as a buffer preserving social peace between nobles and peasants. In the east the serfs were emancipated but the Junker class maintained its large estates and monopolized political power.

Around 1800 the Catholic monasteries, which had large land holdings, were nationalized and sold off by the government. In Bavaria they had controlled 56% of the land.

== Enlightenment ==
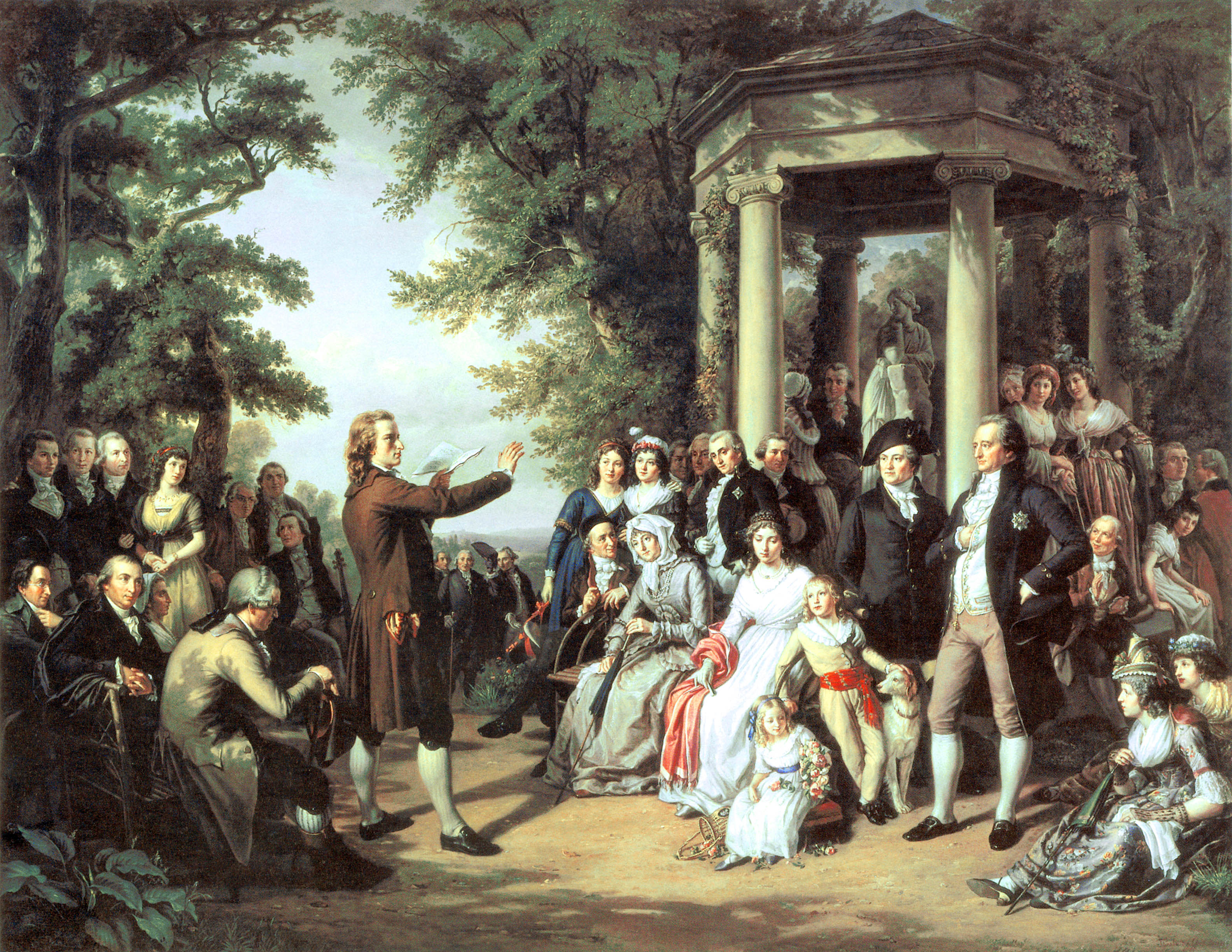
Weimar’s Courtyard of the Muses, a tribute to The Enlightenment and the Weimar Classicism depicting German poets Schiller, Wieland, Herder and Goethe.

Before 1750, the German upper classes often looked to France (or, previously, Italy) for intellectual, cultural and architectural leadership; French was the language of high society. By the mid-18th century the "Aufklärung" (The Enlightenment) had transformed German high culture in music, philosophy, science and literature. Christian Wolff (1679–1754) was the pioneer as a writer who expounded the Enlightenment to German readers; he legitimized German as a philosophic language.

Johann Gottfried Herder (1744–1803) broke new ground in philosophy and poetry, as a leader of the Sturm und Drang movement of proto-Romanticism. Weimar Classicism ("Weimarer Klassik") was a cultural and literary movement based in Weimar that sought to establish a new humanism by synthesizing Romantic, classical, and Enlightenment ideas. The movement, from 1772 until 1805, involved Herder as well as polymath Johann Wolfgang von Goethe (1749–1832) and Friedrich Schiller (1759–1805), a poet and historian. Herder argued that every folk had its own particular identity, which was expressed in its language and culture. This legitimized the promotion of German language and culture and helped shape the development of German nationalism. Schiller's plays expressed the restless spirit of his generation, depicting the hero's struggle against social pressures and the force of destiny.

German music, sponsored by the upper classes, came of age under composers Johann Sebastian Bach (1685–1750), Joseph Haydn (1732–1809), Wolfgang Amadeus Mozart (1756–1791), and Ludwig van Beethoven.

In remote Königsberg philosopher Immanuel Kant (1724–1804) tried to reconcile rationalism and religious belief, individual freedom, and political authority. Kant's work contained basic tensions that would continue to shape German thought – and indeed all of European philosophy – well into the 20th century.

The German Enlightenment won the support of princes, aristocrats, and the middle classes, and it permanently reshaped the culture.

== French Revolution 1789–1815 ==
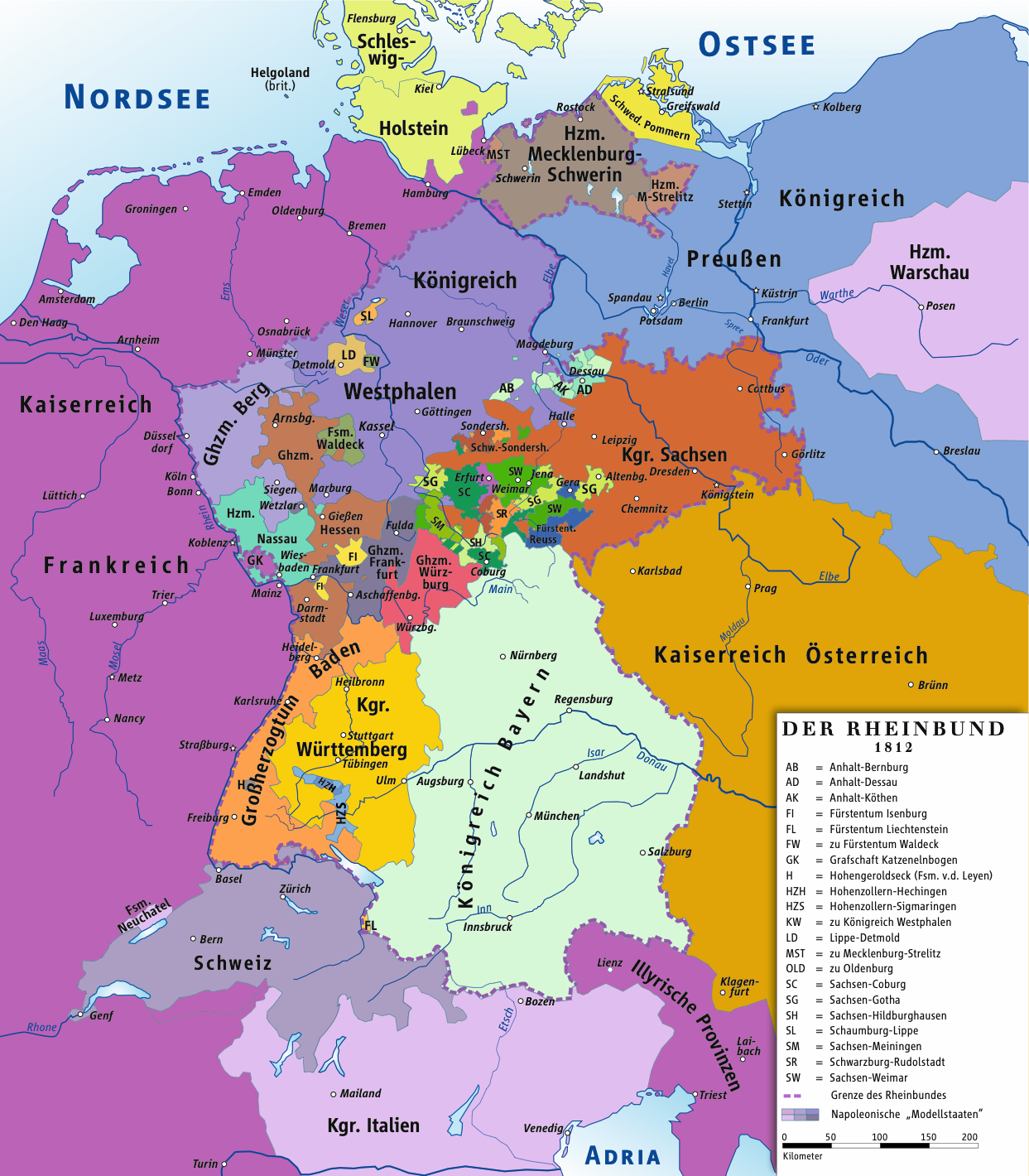
The Confederation of the Rhine, a confederation of client states of the First French Empire, existed from 1806 to 1813.

German reaction to the French Revolution was mixed at first. German intellectuals celebrated the outbreak, hoping to see the triumph of Reason and The Enlightenment. The royal courts in Vienna and Berlin denounced the overthrow of the king and the threatened spread of notions of liberty, equality, and fraternity. By 1793, the execution of the French king and the onset of the Terror disillusioned the Bildungsbürgertum (educated middle classes). Reformers said the solution was to have faith in the ability of Germans to reform their laws and institutions in peaceful fashion.

Europe was racked by two decades of war revolving around France's efforts to spread its revolutionary ideals, as well as to annex Belgium and the Rhine's Left Bank to France and establish puppet regimes in the Netherlands, Germany and Italy. The French revolutionaries' open and strident republicanism led to the conclusion of a defensive alliance between Austria and Prussia on 7 February 1792. The alliance also declared that any violation of the borders of the Empire by France would be a cause for war. The extremists among the French revolutionaries saw war as a chance to defeat their domestic opponents and embarrass the king, whose Austrian wife, Marie-Antoinette, was Emperor Leopold II's sister. They demanded that Austria not only disarm but abandon all alliances directed against France. Upon Leopold II's refusal, France declared war on Austria and Prussia on 20 April. Austria and Prussia then invaded France, but were defeated at the Battle of Valmy (1792). The German lands saw armies marching back and forth, bringing devastation (albeit on a far lower scale than the Thirty Years' War, almost two centuries before), but also bringing new ideas of liberty and civil rights for the people. Prussia and Austria ended their failed wars with France but (with Russia) partitioned Poland among themselves in 1793 and 1795. The French took control of the Rhineland, imposed French-style reforms, abolished feudalism, established constitutions, promoted freedom of religion, emancipated Jews, opened the bureaucracy to ordinary citizens of talent, and forced the nobility to share power with the rising middle class. Napoleon created the Kingdom of Westphalia (1807–1813) as a model state. These reforms proved largely permanent and modernized the western parts of Germany. When the French tried to impose the French language, German opposition grew in intensity. A Second Coalition of Britain, Russia, and Austria then attacked France but failed. Napoleon established direct or indirect control over most of western Europe, including the German states apart from Prussia and Austria. The old Holy Roman Empire was little more than a farce; Napoleon simply abolished it in 1806 while forming new countries under his control. In Germany Napoleon set up the "Confederation of the Rhine", comprising most of the German states except Prussia and Austria.

Prussia tried to remain neutral while imposing tight controls on dissent, but with German nationalism sharply on the rise, the small nation blundered by going to war with Napoleon in 1806. Its economy was weak, its leadership poor, and the once mighty Prussian army was a hollow shell. Napoleon easily crushed it at the Battle of Jena (1806). Napoleon occupied Berlin, and Prussia paid dearly. Prussia lost its recently acquired territories in western Germany, its army was reduced to 42,000 men, no trade with Britain was allowed, and Berlin had to pay Paris heavy reparations and fund the French army of occupation. Saxony changed sides to support Napoleon and join his Confederation of the Rhine; its elector was rewarded with the title of king and given a slice of Poland taken from Prussia.

After Napoleon's failed invasion of Russia in 1812, including the deaths of many Germans in his invasion army, Prussia joined with Russia. Major battles followed in quick order, and when Austria switched sides to oppose Napoleon his situation grew tenuous. He was defeated at the Battle of Leipzig in late 1813, and his empire quickly unraveled. One after another the German states switched to oppose Napoleon, but he rejected peace terms. Allied armies invaded France in early 1814, Paris fell, and in April Napoleon surrendered. He returned for 100 days in 1815, but was finally defeated by the British and German armies at Waterloo. Prussia was the big winner at the Vienna peace conference, gaining extensive territory.

== See also ==
- 18th-century German literature
- Kingdom of Prussia
- German dualism
- Austrian Empire
