= Finis Ewing =

American minister (1773–1841)

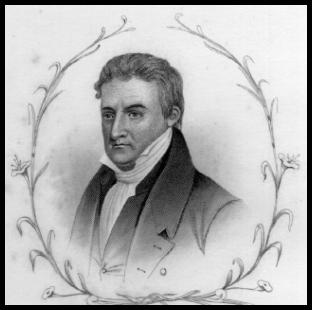
Finis Ewing

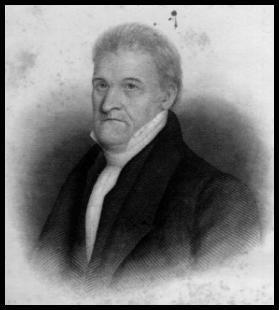
An older Finis Ewing

Finis Ewing (July 10, 1773 – July 4, 1841) was the primary founder of the Cumberland Presbyterian Denomination on February 4, 1810.

== Biography ==
Originally ordained by Transylvania Presbytery of the Presbyterian Church (USA) in 1803, Ewing became one of the leading ministers in the Second Great Awakening or Great Revival that took place on the American frontier in the early 19th century. When Kentucky Synod turned against the revival movement and moved to discipline what it considered to be rebellious presbyteries, in 1805, Ewing found himself with the outcasts. The synod believed that it was protecting the integrity of the ministry by requiring a classical education prior to ordination. Frontier presbyteries protested that they had an immediate need for ministers and that frontier preachers could hardly be expected to attend Princeton Theological Seminary.

Between 1805 and 1810, the Presbyterian outcasts operated as the Council of Revival Ministers. They tended to their congregations as best they could while attempting to reconcile themselves with the Presbyterian Church (USA). By 1810, it was obvious that a reunion would not happen in the near future. Ewing, along with ministers Samuel McAdow and Samuel King, constituted an independent Cumberland Presbytery on February 4, 1810. Ewing, in particular, hoped that the Cumberland Presbyterian Church and the Presbyterian Church (USA) one day would reunite.

Ewing was among several Protestant ministers who in 1831 helped to inspire the mobs that drove the Mormons from Jackson County, Missouri. He wrote in a local newspaper, "The Mormons are the common enemies of mankind and ought to be destroyed."

Ewing was the father of Ephraim Brevard Ewing, who twice served as a justice of the Missouri Supreme Court.

== Sources ==
- The History of the Cumberland Presbyterian Church in Kentucky to 1988 by Matthew H. Gore. Published by the Joint Heritage Committee of Covenant and Cumberland Presbyteries (Memphis, Tennessee), 2000.
- Shakers, Mormons, and Religious Worlds: Conflicting Visions, Contested Boundaries (Religion in North America) by Stephen C. Taysom, Indiana University Press, 2011, p. 59.
