= Cumberland Presbytery =

The Cumberland Presbytery existed from 1802 to 1806 as a presbytery of the Presbyterian Church in the United States of America, a predecessor to the Presbyterian Church (U.S.A.). The presbytery was strongly influenced by the Second Great Awakening and has an important place within the history of the Cumberland Presbyterian Church.

== Creation ==
In 1786, Transylvania Presbytery was established from part of Abingdon Presbytery in the Synod of Virginia. Transylvania Presbytery originally encompassed all of Kentucky, settlements on the Cumberland River in Tennessee, and later the settlements on the Big and Little Miami Rivers in Ohio.

The presbytery grew rapidly and in 1799 was divided into three smaller presbyteries. Transylvania Presbytery retained the area to the south and west of the Kentucky River in central Kentucky. West Lexington Presbytery covered the area of Kentucky between the Kentucky River and the Licking River. Washington Presbytery comprised the area northeast of the Licking River and north of the Ohio River.

In 1802, these three presbyteries were separated from the Synod of Virginia to form the Kentucky Synod. One of the first actions of the Kentucky Synod was to form Cumberland Presbytery from the portion of Transylvania Presbytery south of the Salt River.

== Dissolution ==
Cumberland Presbytery was the heart of the Second Great Awakening. Although ministers in support of the Revival of 1800 generally dominated the presbytery, the anti-revival faction dominated the Kentucky Synod. In 1806, differences between the presbytery and the synod over the revival, ordination standards for ministers, and the literal interpretation of the Westminster Confession of Faith resulted in Cumberland Presbytery being dissolved back into Transylvania Presbytery.

The former members of Cumberland Presbytery fought for their position for a number of years in the hope that the Kentucky Synod would reconsider. The General Assembly of the Presbyterian Church agreed that the synod had made an error of judgement, but it took no action to reinstate Cumberland Presbytery. In 1810, the former members of Cumberland Presbytery reformed the presbytery as the Cumberland Presbyterian Church.

== Sources ==
- History of the Cumberland Presbyterian Church in Kentucky to 1988, by Matthew H. Gore, Joint Heritage Committee of Covenant and Cumberland Presbyteries. Memphis, Tennessee, 2000.
- 2006 Minutes of the General Assembly of the Cumberland Presbyterian Church (Memphis: Tennessee, 2006).
