= Thomas Campbell =

Thomas, Tom, or Tommy Campbell may refer to:

== Arts and entertainment ==
- Thomas Campbell (poet) (1777–1844), Scottish poet
- Thomas Campbell (sculptor) (1790–1858), Scottish sculptor
- Thomas Campbell (visual artist) (born 1969), California-based visual artist
- Tom Campbell (radio personality) (fl. late 20th century), American radio personality and voice actor
- Thomas P. Campbell (born 1962), director of the Fine Arts Museums of San Francisco
- Tommy Campbell (actor) (born 1978), stand-up comedian, actor and writer
- Tommy Campbell (musician) (born 1957), American jazz drummer

== Politics ==
- Thomas Campbell (Australian politician) (1845–1885), member of the Queensland Legislative Assembly
- Thomas B. Campbell (1788–1885), New York state assemblyman
- Thomas C. Campbell (1845–1904), New York lawyer and Cincinnati political boss
- Thomas Cooper Campbell, New York state senator in the 98th New York State Legislature
- Thomas Edmund Campbell (1809–1872), seigneur and political figure in Canada East
- Thomas Edward Campbell (1878–1944), governor of Arizona
- Thomas F. Campbell (1897–1957), New York politician
- Thomas Hayes Campbell (1815–1862), Illinois politician and auditor
- Thomas Jefferson Campbell (1786–1850), American politician
- Thomas Joseph Campbell (1872–1946), Irish politician, journalist & jurist
- Thomas Mitchell Campbell (1856–1923), American politician, governor of Texas
- Thomas H. Campbell III (1932–2011), American politician, member of the Mississippi House of Representatives
- Tom Campbell (California politician) (born 1952), former congressman, 2010 U.S. Senate candidate
- Tom Campbell (Canadian politician) (1927–2012), Canadian mayor of Vancouver
- Tom Campbell (North Dakota politician) (born 1959), North Dakota Senate
- Tom Campbell (Washington politician) (born 1954), member of the Washington House of Representatives
- Thomas Campbell (West Virginia politician) (born 1961), member of the West Virginia House of Delegates
- Tom Campbell (New Zealand politician), mayor of Invercargill, New Zealand

== Religion ==
- Thomas Campbell (writer) (1733–1795), Church of Ireland clergyman and traveller
- Thomas Campbell (minister) (1763–1854), American religious leader
- Thomas Hardesty Campbell (1907–1989), American Cumberland Presbyterian minister
- Thomas Vincent Campbell (1863–1930), Irish-born missionary physician and entomologist

== Sport ==
=== Gridiron football ===
- Thomas J. Campbell (American football) (1886–1972), American college football coach
- Tommy Campbell (American football) (born 1947), American football cornerback in the National Football League in 1976
- Tommie Campbell (born 1987), American football cornerback in the National Football League and Canadian Football League in the 2010s

=== Other sports ===
- Tom Campbell (athlete) (1898–1971), American Olympic runner
- Thomas P. Campbell (athlete), English runner
- Tom Campbell (South African cricketer) (1882–1924), South African wicket-keeper
- Thomas Campbell (New Zealand cricketer) (1871–1950), New Zealand cricketer
- Thomas Campbell (footballer) (1908–1982), Scottish footballer
- Tommy Campbell (footballer) (1935–2018), Scottish former footballer
- Tom Campbell (footballer, born 1924) (1924–1990), Australian rules footballer for Hawthorn
- Tom Campbell (footballer, born 1991), Former Australian rules footballer for Western Bulldogs, North Melbourne St Kilda and Melbourne.
- Tom Campbell (ice hockey) (1922–1996), Canadian ice hockey player with the East York Lyndhursts

== Other ==
- Thomas Lopton Campbell Jr. (1809–1893), American pioneer and Texas Ranger
- Thomas J. Campbell (university president) (1848–1925), of St. John's College (now Fordham University)
- Thomas D. Campbell (1882–1966), wheat farmer and pioneer of corporate farming
- Thomas Monroe Campbell (1883–1956), field agent for the U.S. Department of Agriculture
- Tom Campbell (philosopher) (1938–2019), philosopher and law professor
- Thomas Draper Campbell (1893–1967), Australian scholar of dental anthropology
- Thomas Campbell, Scottish convict involved in the Glasgow ice cream wars
- Thomas Nolan Campbell (1908–2003), American archaeologist and ethnohistorian
- T. J. D. Campbell (Thomas James Duncan Campbell, 1922–1989), Singaporean brigadier-general
- T. Colin Campbell (born 1934), American biochemist

== See also ==
- Tom Campbell Black (1899–1936), English aviator
- Thomas Cambell (1536–1614), English merchant who was Lord Mayor of London in 1609
- Thomas J. Campbell (disambiguation)
- Campbell (surname)
