= James W. Knight =

James Wade Knight (9 January 1925 in Guthrie, Kentucky – 2 April 2005) was a Cumberland Presbyterian minister. He served as that denomination's first Director of Ministry and was the Executive of Kentucky Synod.

James Wade Knight was born January 9, 1925, in Guthrie, Kentucky. His parents, Eric Grady and Alice Elmine McElroy Knight, were members of the Arlington Cumberland Presbyterian Church in Erin, Tennessee. He was educated in the public schools of Todd County, Kentucky, and Houston County, Tennessee. He graduated from Bethel College and from the Cumberland Presbyterian Theological Seminary (now Memphis Theological Seminary). He did further graduate study at Garrett Theological Seminary in Evanston, Illinois, and North Texas State University in Denton, Texas. On June 5, 1946, he married Helen Louise Shelton. He was ordained by Clarksville Presbytery on August 15, 1946. He served pastorates in Kentucky, Tennessee, Illinois, Indiana, Alabama, Oklahoma, and Texas. He served as the Executive Secretary of Kentucky Synod from 1984 to 1988. He was elected Moderator of the General Assembly in 1986. He served as the director of the Commission on Ministry from 1992 to 2000. He wrote Hearth and Chalice, a book published in 1980 in commemoration of the 100th anniversary of the founding of the Women's Board of Missions. Rev. James Wade Knight died on April 2, 2005.

== Sources ==
- 2006 Minutes of the General Assembly of the Cumberland Presbyterian Church (Memphis: Tennessee, 2006).
