= West Lexington Presbytery =

West Lexington Presbytery of the Presbyterian Church (USA) was formed from Transylvania Presbytery in 1799. It covered the area of Kentucky between the Kentucky River and the Licking River. In 1802, the West Lexington, Transylvania, and Washington Presbyteries were formed into Kentucky Synod, separate from the Synod of Virginia.

== Sources ==
- History of the Cumberland Presbyterian Church in Kentucky to 1988, by Matthew H. Gore, Joint Heritage Committee of Covenant and Cumberland Presbyteries. Memphis, Tennessee, 2000.
