= Council of Revival Ministers =

The Council of Revival Ministers was a group of disaffected Presbyterian clergy in the frontier areas of Kentucky and Tennessee. Ejected by the Presbyterian Church in 1805, these ministers banded together to better tend their congregations while they sought to address their grievances with the church. In 1810, when it became clear that no redress was forthcoming, most of the Council joined with Finis Ewing in the formation of the Cumberland Presbyterian Church.

== Sources ==
- The History of the Cumberland Presbyterian Church in Kentucky to 1988 by Matthew H. Gore. Published by the Joint Heritage Committee of Covenant and Cumberland Presbyteries (Memphis, Tennessee), 2000.
