= Franceway Ranna Cossitt =

American minister (1790–1863)

Franceway Ranna Cossitt (April 24, 1790 - February 3, 1863) was an early minister in the Cumberland Presbyterian denomination of Christianity. He was also the first stated clerk of the Cumberland Presbyterian General Assembly in 1829. He was also the founder of Cumberland College in Princeton, Kentucky, in 1825, which was eventually moved to Lebanon, Tennessee, in 1843, to become Cumberland University. The name Franceway Ranna was a frontier corruption of François-René.

== Early life ==
=== Education ===
Cossitt was born in Claremont, New Hampshire on April 24, 1790 to Ambrose and Anna Catherine (Cole) Cossitt. His family was Episcopal. His maternal grandfather and an uncle were in succession pastors of the Episcopal congregation at Claremont. His great uncle, Rev. Ranna Cossitt, was a Loyalist who became the first Anglican minister in Sydney, Nova Scotia, Canada.

At the age of fourteen, Cossitt commenced his preparation for college, and entered Middlebury College, in Vermont, graduating in 1813. After leaving college, he spent two years teaching, at Morristown, New Jersey; it was customary, in those days, for men who had completed their collegiate studies to spend some time in teaching before entering upon the study of those things relating more immediately to their chosen profession. From Morristown, he went to North Carolina, and took charge of Vine Hill Academy, on Roanoke River.

From North Carolina he returned to New England, deeply impressed with the necessity of personal religion. His original purpose was to engage in the legal profession, but with his spiritual change came a change of purpose and he resolved to devote himself to the Christian ministry. He studied theology at New Haven, in what has since become the General Episcopal Seminary of New York - the institution having been removed. Bishop Brownell, of Connecticut, gave him a license as a "lay reader" in the Episcopal Church.

=== Teaching and ministry ===
Cossitt moved to Tennessee and established a school at a little place on Cumberland River, called in its day New York, a few miles below Clarksville. A number of his friends from Carolina had moved and settled there. They were wealthy and desired to educate their children. With a view to this object, they urged his settlement among them. His school went on to become an unofficial theological seminary where a number of young men studied for the ministry.

In the fall of 1821, he came to a camp meeting held on Wells's Creek, in Stewart county. He was accompanied by William Clements, an elder in the Church. The ministers in attendance included Thomas Calhoun, Robert Baker, and Robert S. Donnell. Cossitt preached on Saturday evening, although he was still an Episcopalian. His text was, "If they hear not Moses and the prophets, neither will they be persuaded, though one rose from the dead." The sermon was an argument in support of the truth of the Christian Scriptures. This was his introduction to Cumberland Presbyterians.

In 1822 he joined the work of the ministry in the Cumberland Presbyterian Church and became a member of the Anderson Presbytery. On the 19th of February, of the same year, he was married to Miss Lucinda Blair, of Montgomery County, whose father was a prominent member of the Church. They went on have five children.

Shortly after his marriage, he issued a prospectus with a view to the publication of a paper, which he proposed to call the Western Star; however, the publication was never commenced. After spending two or three years in New York, he moved to Elkton, Kentucky, and established a school there.

== Cumberland College ==
=== Establishment ===
At the sessions of the Cumberland Synod at Princeton, in 1825, the plan of Cumberland College was announced. Commissioners were appointed to examine particular points and make the location and a second set of commissioners was appointed to procure a charter for the proposed Institution from the Legislature of Kentucky. It was to have been called the Cumberland Presbyterian College. The men who visited the Legislature to procure a charter were advised to drop the "Presbyterian" from the proposed name, as it might arouse sectarian opposition among the members and their friends, and thus cause the application to be rejected. Accordingly, the application was made for a charter of Cumberland College. The change was displeasing to some leading members of the Church and was perhaps the first step in producing a series of embarrassments which grew so much that in a few years the existence of the Institution was placed in jeopardy.

The Institution was located in the vicinity of Princeton and a farm was bought about a mile from the town. It was to be a manual labor school, and arrangements were made accordingly. Cossitt was chosen to be President and opened the college in March 1826. He would be president for the next seventeen years.

Cumberland College was an experiment. The country was comparatively new and the Cumberland Presbyterian Church had been chiefly devoted to the more immediate work of saving sinners and collecting congregations. The itinerant plan of preaching, and yearly camp meetings, constituted a large part of their work. The establishment of denominational schools and of colleges had been overlooked. The lessons necessary for success had to be learned from experience. The college looked to the education of young men, and especially of young men preparing for the ministry, who were not able to support themselves at more expensive college. Young men who were more used to a plow were to be converted into scholars, statesmen, and pulpit orators. The students were to occupy dormitories with straw beds and furniture of the plainest and cheapest king. Food was to be healthful, but plain and cheap. All luxuries were proscribed. The students were to work two hours each day except the Sabbath and to pay sixty dollars a year into the College treasury.

Cossitt collected some of the best young men in the land. A large log building was constructed for College purposes, and the students who were educated there during ten of the first years of the Institution "rubbed their backs against wooden walls.". Notwithstanding what would now be considered the grimness and severity of the system, the college was popular and in the spring and summer of 1830, 125 men were attending classes.

=== Financial difficulties of the College ===
At the meeting of the General Assembly in 1830, it was thought necessary to raise the charges in money from sixty to eighty dollars as the expenditures were greater than its friends had anticipated. Money had been borrowed to pay for the farm, and other debts had been contracted, and the interest was an eating cancer.

In 1831 the General Assembly leased the College to Rev. John Barnett and Rev. Aaron Shelby for a term of years. During this time, the Church had become to some degree alienated and confidence in the final success of the enterprise was failing. Barnett and Shelby were to have all the proceeds of the College after paying the necessary expenditures - to support a sufficient number of instructors, to keep up the boarding-house, and pay the debts of the College. Mr. Shelby continued his connection with the Institution till the summer or fall of 1833 when he sold his interest to Mr. Harvey Young. The following year, Mr Young died, and the entire management of the financial affairs of the College fell into the hands of Mr. Barnett. At the same time, a number of persons fell victim to cholera and a malignant fever spread over the country. The condition of things became so bad at the College, that a temporary suspension of operations was found absolutely necessary. The manager of the farm and boarding-house died; one of the professors was finally prostrated, one of the students died, and a number were sick. The Church also began to complain about Mr. Barnett. Some thought he managed badly; others thought he managed wholly with a view to his own selfish ends; others went so far as to impeach his integrity as a man of business and a Christian. A change became necessary.

The General Assembly of 1837 met at Princeton and Cumberland College Association was formed and Barnett's interest was transferred to the Association as a joint-stock company. It was pledged to carry on the operations of the Institution under the direction and control of the General Assembly. Prospects seemed to brighten but after a temporary revival of interest and confidence, some people at the College believed that the Church had deserted it, and that assistance was to be expected from that quarter. The idea of transferring the Institution to the control of the Episcopalians of Kentucky was seriously considered. The result of this condition of things was a great effort on the part of Cossitt to arouse the Church to take interest in the College. He and Rev. F. C. Usher, who was connected with him in the department of instruction, published a circular letter, in which earnest appeals were made to the ministers and members of the Church.

These efforts were continued to the meeting of the General Assembly, which occurred in May following, Its sessions were held at Elkton, Kentucky. When the Assembly met, it proposed raising one hundred thousand dollars for educational purposes. Fifty-five thousand dollars of that sum was to serve as a perpetual endowment of Cumberland College; thirty thousand was to be used in Pennsylvania, in the endowment of a college there; and the remaining fifteen thousand dollars was to constitute a sort of floating capital, to be used as circumstances might suggest. Several of the most popular young men in the Church were engaged as agents and Cossitt confidently believed that the College would be endowed and that the most liberal provision would be made for the education of candidates for the ministry.

At the General Assembly of 1841 things seemed to be going forward smoothly. However, by the time of the General Assembly in 1842, Cumberland College was still in debt, and its property was under execution, and liable to be placed under the sheriff's hammer any day. A committee of churchmen, was appointed to consider the matter, and take action; they met in Nashville, on 1st July 1842, and determined to establish Cumberland College in Lebanon, Tennessee. Cossitt was elected to the presidency of the new College and the commencement of the College at Princeton in 1842, a position he held until 1860. The friends of the old Institution, sold its property, paid its debts, and continued its operations with respectable success for a number of years.

== Later life ==
In 1829 Cossitt travelled through some of the Middle and Southern States. He spent some time in Washington City, and while there published and circulated a pamphlet, setting out the character and claims of the College. He preached in several of the churches Washington as well as in Baltimore and Philadelphia, receiving very respectful attention in both cities. He brought one young man from Baltimore, and two or three from Eastern Virginia, to the Institution. Two of them remained until they graduated.

Early in 1830, the leading men connected with the College starting publishing the Religious and Literary Intelligencer, at Princeton. It was the first periodical of the Church. Cossitt was a principal contributor to its columns. It afterward became the Revivalist, and finally the Cumberland Presbyterian, in Nashville.

In 1839 he received the Doctorate of Divinity from Middlebury College, and also from the Trustees of Cumberland College, with which he was then connected.

In March 1840, he commenced the publication of the Banner of Peace, which was originally a monthly periodical. After a year, it became a weekly paper.

Early in the year 1843 Cossitt moved to Lebanon and took charge of Cumberland College at that place. In a short time, the Institution became what is now Cumberland University. He continued in the presidency of the College till the fall of 1844, when he resigned, and was succeeded by Rev. T. C. Anderson. He then focussed on the publication of the Banner of Peace until the close of 1849. His editorial valedictory is contained in the number of the 24th December 1849. The paper was transferred to Rev. W. D. Chadick and Mr. W. L. Berry. Mr. Chadick assumed control of the editorial department.

In 1853 Dr. Cossitt published his Life and Times of Finis Ewing.

In the same year, he was elected by the Trustees Professor of Systematic Theology at Cumberland University. He declined this appointment he declined, on the grounds of age and ill-health.

== Personal life ==
Lucinda Cossitt died in 1833. On 19th January 1834, Cossitt married a second time, to Miss Matilda Edwards, of Elkton, Kentucky. During his time at Princeton he had also buried a daughter. After arriving at Lebanon, he had buried two more daughters, as well as his only son, and a son-in-law.

In January 1863 he became ill and he died on the morning of 3 February 1863.
