= Shall Woman Preach =

Shall Woman Preach may refer to:

- Shall Woman Preach, an 1891 book by Louisa Mariah Layman Woosley
- Harvey, William (1905). "Shall Woman Preach". Baptist History and Heritage. 35 (3).
