= Beverly St. John =

Beverly St. John (October 14, 1918 – May 18, 2017) was an elder in the Cumberland Presbyterian Church and served as that denomination's first female moderator of the General Assembly in 1988. The Cumberland Presbyterian denomination had been the first Presbyterian body to ordain women as clergy beginning with Louisa Woosley in 1889. St. John also authored a collection of essays for parents of small children, As the Twig is Bent, in the mid-1960s, and co-authored a book of poetry with Rev. James Knight, "The Prophet is a Snow Man" in 1986.

In 1977, St. John was awarded a Doctor of Letters Degree by Bethel University in McKenzie, Tennessee. In May 2008 at the age of 89 she was awarded the first Honorary Doctor of Divinity degree from Memphis Theological Seminary. An endowment fund was established in honor of her and Bill St. John to benefit the seminary.

St. John died on May 18, 2017.

== Sources ==
- 2006 Minutes of the General Assembly of the Cumberland Presbyterian Church (Memphis: Tennessee, 2006).
