= Vine Hill Academy =

Private school in North Carolina, US

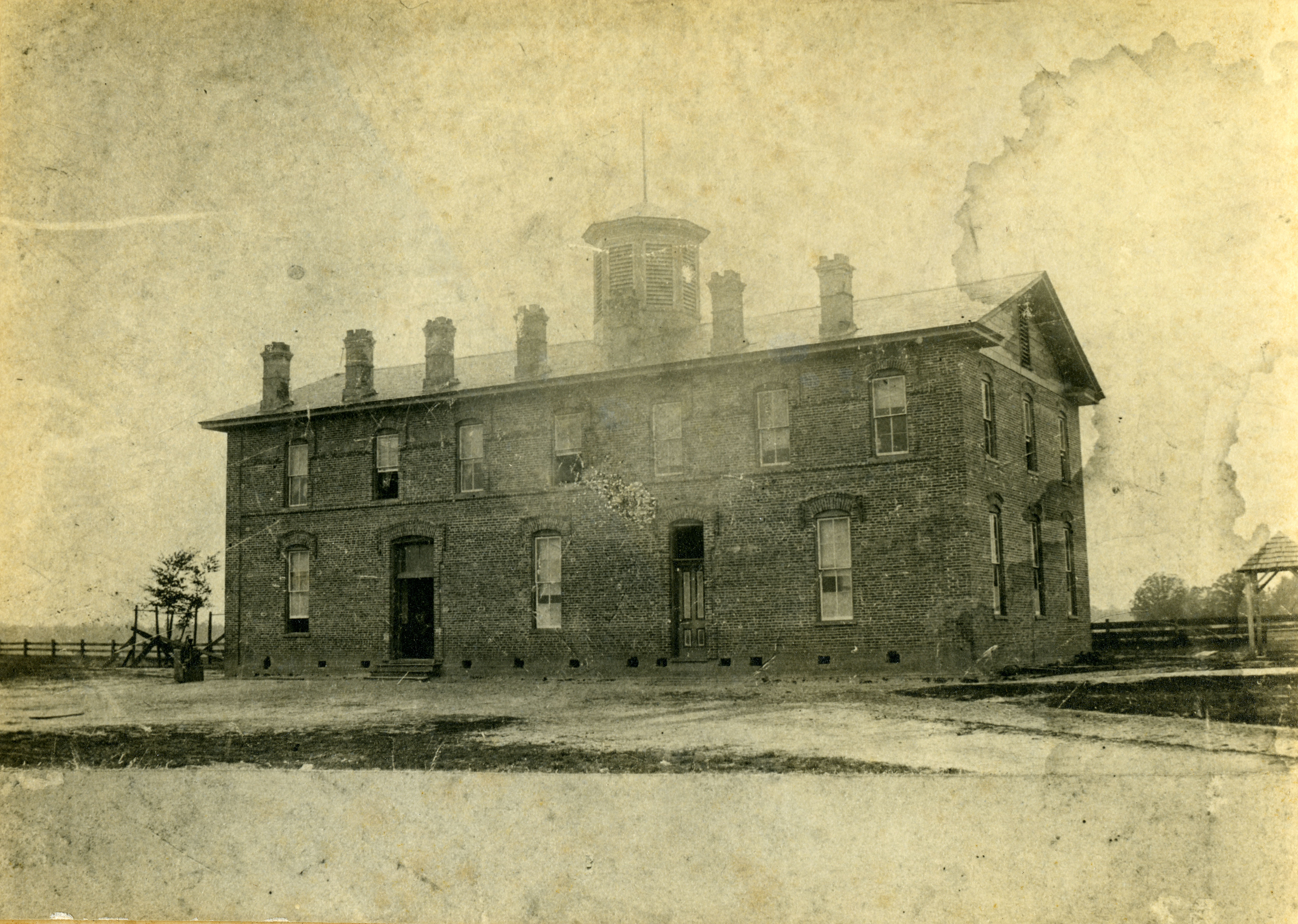
- Scotland Neck, Halifax County, North Carolina; United States

Information
- Other names: Vine Hill Male Academy; Vine Hill Female Academy
- Opened: January 1811
- Closed: June 8, 1916
- Category: Private secondary and preparatory school

Vine Hill Academy, also called the Vine HIll Male Academy and the Vine Hill Female Academy, was a private secondary school in Halifax County, North Carolina. It operated from January 1811 through June 1916. The Encyclopedia of North Carolina notes that the academy taught many prominent North Carolinians, including a governor, college presidents, congressmen, and a North Carolina Supreme Court justice.

== History ==
Vine Hill Academy was a private secondary school in Clarksville, Halifax County, North Carolina (later called Scotland Neck). (Note: The villages of Clarksville and Greenwood merged and incorporated as Scotland Neck in 1867.) The North Carolina General Assembly approved the Vine Hill Academy's charter in 1809. Its founding trustees were John Anthony, Simmons Jones Baker, Marmaduke James Norfleet, Josiah Nelms, Willis Powell, James Smith Jr., William Ruffin Smith, and Peyton Randolph Tunstall. The academy was named for Vine Hill, the home of Baker in what is now called Scotland Neck, North Carolina. It was located on property donated by Norfleet.

Vine Hill Academy opened in January 1811 as a school for boys. It became one of the most successful schools in eastern North Carolina. Daniel Adams of Stratford, Connecticut was the school's first principal; he also taught languages. Franceway Ranna Cossitt, who founded Cumberland College in 1826, served as Vine Hill Academy's principal starting in 1815. Episcopal minister John H. Norment was charge of the school from September 1829 to June 1930; his wife oversaw the new female division. Norment was replaced by Robert A. Ezell. Under Ezell, the faculty included L. Whitehead, Fanny Critchlow with the women's department, and Felicia Vaughn in the music department.

Vine Hill Academy expanded to include a separate building for female students by 1837. The female department was overseen by Miss Rowan and Miss Hanks, both from New York. The department was suspended in 1847 due to a lack of students but operated intermittently in later years. The academy stayed open during the Civil War, despite many students enlisting in the Confederate Army. However, it sold part of its property in 1867.

As the State of North Carolina expanded its public education system, Vine Hill Academy lost students. By the 1890s, the school had split into two institutions—the Vine Hill Male Academy and the Vine Hill Female Academy. In 1891, the female academy had 44 students was run by Miss Lena H. Smith and Miss S. E. McDowell.

In 1894, Wake Forest College roommates C. W. Wilson and David M. Prince became co-principals of Vine Hill Male Academy, but Wilson left in June 1898 after disagreements resulting from Prince purchasing the school property. The Vine Hill Male Academy campus, consisting of 4 acres (1.6 ha), was sold to Prince at auction on May 7, 1898. In the fall of 1899, Louis Round Wilson joined Prince as a co-principal. Wilson left after one year to join the faculty of Catawba College. T. J. Creekmore replaced Prince in September 1901.

Vine Hill Female Academy closed after its commencement ceremony on June 6, 1903. L. W. Bayley was its last principal, having served in this capacity for four years, working with his wife and daughter. The academy's trustees leased the campus to Halifax County for a graded public school that opened in the fall of 1903.

Vine Hill Male Academy closed after its June 8, 1916 commencement ceremony.

Papers relating to Vine Hill Academy are archived at the Louis Round Wilson Library of the University of North Carolina at Chapel Hill.

== Campus ==
Vine Hill Academy was located in Scotland Neck, Halifax County, North Carolina on 40 acres (16 ha)that were donated by trustee Marmaduke Norfleet. The campus included boarding facilities or students could live off-campus in nearby "respectable" houses. The original buildings were paid for by subscriptions. Before 1837, a second building was added to accommodate female students. Boarding costs in 1837 were $7 a month.

A new building for boys was added shortly before the Civil War. The academy purchased a former Baptist Church and moved it to the campus in 1881 to use as a schoolhouse.

== Academics ==
VIine Hill Academy was a boarding and day school. In 1812, tuition was $12 a year for reading, writing, and arithmetic. Grammar was an extra $15 per year and the languages or geography were $25 per year.

In 1837, courses for male students included arithmetic, grammar, geography, history, reading, spelling, and writing for $8 per session. Male students could take algebra, geometry, Greek, Latin, logic, navigation, rhetoric, and surveying for $12.50 a session. French was an additional $12.50. The female department was divided into two divisions. The first division included arithmetic, elementary geography, grammar, history reading, spelling, and writing for $8 a session. The second division offered classes in American history, ancient history, astronomy, chemistry, elements of criticism, logic, modern history, moral and intellectual philosophy, natural philosophy, natural theology, rhetoric, and universal geography for $10 per session. Additional courses included botany for $13, drawing for $8, flower painting for $10, French for $12.50, and oil painting for $10.

== Notable people ==
=== Alumni ===
According to the Encyclopedia of North Carolina, Vine Hill Academy "educated many prominent North Carolinians".

- William Horn Battle, North Carolina Supreme Court justice
- Charles Edward Brewer, president of Meredith College
- William Ruffin Cox, brigadier general in the Confederate Army, United States House of Representatives from 1881 to 1887, and Secretary of the Senate
- Reuben Oscar Everett, North Carolina House of Representatives from 1921 to 1933
- Claude Kitchin, United States House of Representatives from 1901 to 1923, House Majority Leader
- Thurman D. Kitchin, president of Wake Forest University
- William Walton Kitchin, Governor of North Carolina and United States House of Representatives
- Bartholomew F. Moore, North Carolina legislature, North Carolina Attorney General, and advisor to President Andrew Johnson
- Louis Round Wilson, library director at the University of North Carolina at Chapel Hill, dean at the University of Chicago Graduate Library School, and president of the American Library Association

=== Faculty and trustees ===
- Simmons Jones Baker (trustee), North Carolina Senate and North Carolina House of Commons
- Franceway Ranna Cossitt (principal), founder of Cumberland College
- Louis Round Wilson (principal), library director at the University of North Carolina at Chapel Hill, dean at the University of Chicago Graduate Library School, and president of the American Library Association
