= Benjamin Wilburn McDonnold =

- B W McDonnold
- Born: March 24, 1827
- Died: February 27, 1889 (aged 61)
- Occupation: Presbyterian minister
- Known for: President of Cumberland University
- Notable work: History of the Cumberland Presbyterian Church

Benjamin Wilburn McDonnold, D.D., LL.D. (March 24, 1827- February 27, 1889) was a Presbyterian minister, writer and educator. He was the third President of Cumberland University, and wrote the History of the Cumberland Presbyterian Church.

== Biography ==
=== Early life ===
Benjamin Wilburn McDonnold was born in Overton County, Tennessee and raised on a farm. He exhibited a strong religious turn of mind from a young age, likely inspired by his mother, Martha. He began preparing to become a minister at age 12, attaining candidacy at age 16. Around this time, it is said that he memorized and could recite the entire New Testament. He attended college at Cumberland College in Princeton, Kentucky, graduating in 1849.

=== Career ===
He became Professor of Mathematics at Bethel Seminary, and later at Bethel College. When the college closed during the Civil War he became pastor of the Presbyterian Church at Lebanon, Tennessee, and for a time a chaplain in the Confederate army.

After the war, he accepted a position to teach at the re-opened Cumberland University. Near the end of 1866, he was named the third President of the university, taking over for recently named President Anderson, who resigned due to poor health. This was a very difficult time for the school, which had virtually no money, buildings or students remaining after the war. His hard work alongside the trustees helped the school to re-establish itself, and by 1870–71, 335 students were attending the university.

In failing health, he resigned the Presidency in 1873. After a time of rest his health returned, and he spent time evangelizing in such places as Texas, California and Pennsylvania. He was requested by the Cumberland Presbyterian Church Board of Publication to write the History of the Cumberland Presbyterian Church', which he did.

=== Death ===
He died at his home in Lebanon, Tennessee on February 27, 1889 (age 62).
