= David Rice (Presbyterian minister) =

American minister and anti-slavery activist (1733–1816)

David Rice (December 29, 1733 – June 18, 1816), called "Father" David Rice and referred to by his contemporaries as the "Apostle to Kentucky," was a renowned antislavery Presbyterian minister during the antebellum era in the United States.

== Biography ==
Born in Hanover County, Virginia, "Father" David Rice was one of twelve children of David Rice Sr. and Susanna (Searcy) Rice. Raised an Episcopalian but converting to Presbyterianism early in life, he was educated at the College of New Jersey at Princeton before undertaking further studies under John Todd, who had spent a great deal of time working with Samuel Davies among slaves. Rice would eventually follow in Todd and Davies' footsteps, working among slaves as an ordained Presbyterian minister in Virginia for over twenty years. After being forced out of Virginia, Rice joined the efforts of the Kentucky Abolition Society, serving also as a member of the 1792 Kentucky Constitutional Convention. It was as a member of the convention that Rice pleaded for a gradual emancipation initiative, giving an address entitled, Slavery Inconsistent with Justice and Good Policy. Ultimately, Rice saw the institution of slavery as not only unconstitutional, but as that which violated the most basic tenets of a natural, moral law. He believed, moreover, that it was especially the responsibility of the church to lead the cause for emancipation, expressing in 1799 in a letter to a friend that he wanted Christians to adopt "a rational plan for the gradual abolition of slavery; and do it under the influence of religion and conscience, without any regard for law" (Letter to James Blythe, 1799). In 1792, Rice served as an elected delegate to the Danville convention of 1792 where he pushed for the insertion of a clause in the state's first constitution that would have ended slavery. Rice, ultimately unsuccessful in his efforts towards abolition, served for much of the rest of his life in the Kentucky Abolition Society. Rice also helped to organize the Transylvania Presbytery, the Synod of Kentucky, and Transylvania Seminary, which became Transylvania University.

Married to Mary Blair, the daughter of Presbyterian minister Samuel Blair, Rice was the father of twelve children. He died in Green County, Kentucky and is buried, alongside his wife, in the cemetery beside the Presbyterian church of Danville.

== Archival collections ==
The Presbyterian Historical Society in Philadelphia, Pennsylvania, has a collection of Rev. Rice's original letter.
