= Transylvania Presbytery =

American Presbyterian area

Transylvania Presbytery is a member of the Presbyterian Church (U.S.A.), within the Synod of Living Waters. It oversees 67 churches (2022).

== History ==
Transylvania Presbytery was established in 1786 from part of Abingdon Presbytery, encompassed all of Kentucky, settlements on the Cumberland River in Tennessee, and later the settlements on the Great Miami River and Little Miami River in Ohio.

The presbytery grew rapidly and in 1799 was divided into three smaller presbyteries:

- Transylvania Presbytery retained the area to the south and west of the Kentucky River in central Kentucky.
- West Lexington Presbytery covered the area of Kentucky between the Kentucky River and the Licking River.
- Washington Presbytery comprised the area northeast of the Licking River and north of the Ohio River

In 1802, these three presbyteries were formed into the Kentucky Synod, separate from the Synod of Virginia (Presbyterian). One of the first actions of the Kentucky Synod was to form Cumberland Presbytery from the portion of Transylvania Presbytery south of the Salt River.

== Sources ==
- History of the Cumberland Presbyterian Church in Kentucky to 1988, by Matthew H. Gore, Joint Heritage Committee of Covenant and Cumberland Presbyteries. Memphis, Tennessee, 2000.
