= Cumberland University =

Priviate university in Lebanon, Tennessee, US

Coordinates: 36.204°N 86.299°W

- Former name: Cumberland College (1956–1982)
- Type: Private university
- Established: 1842; 184 years ago
- Endowment: US$15.7 million (2021)
- President: Paul C. Stumb IV
- Provost: C. William McKee
- Students: 3,072
- Location: Lebanon, Tennessee, U.S.
- Colors: Maroon & Black
- Nickname: Phoenix
- Sporting affiliations: NAIA – Mid-South
- Website: www.cumberland.edu

Cumberland University is a private university in Lebanon, Tennessee, United States. It was founded in 1842. The oldest campus buildings were constructed between 1892 and 1896.

== History ==
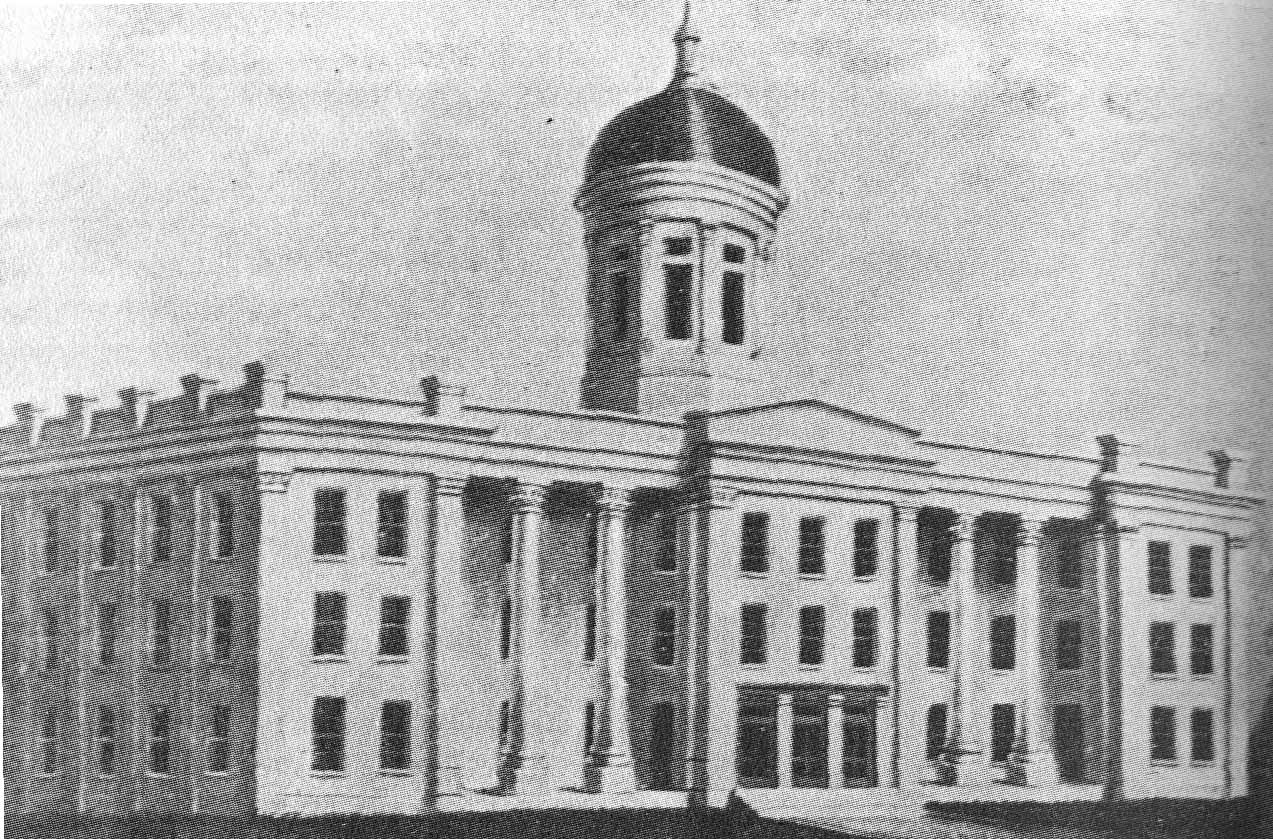
Drawing of Cumberland University, c.1858

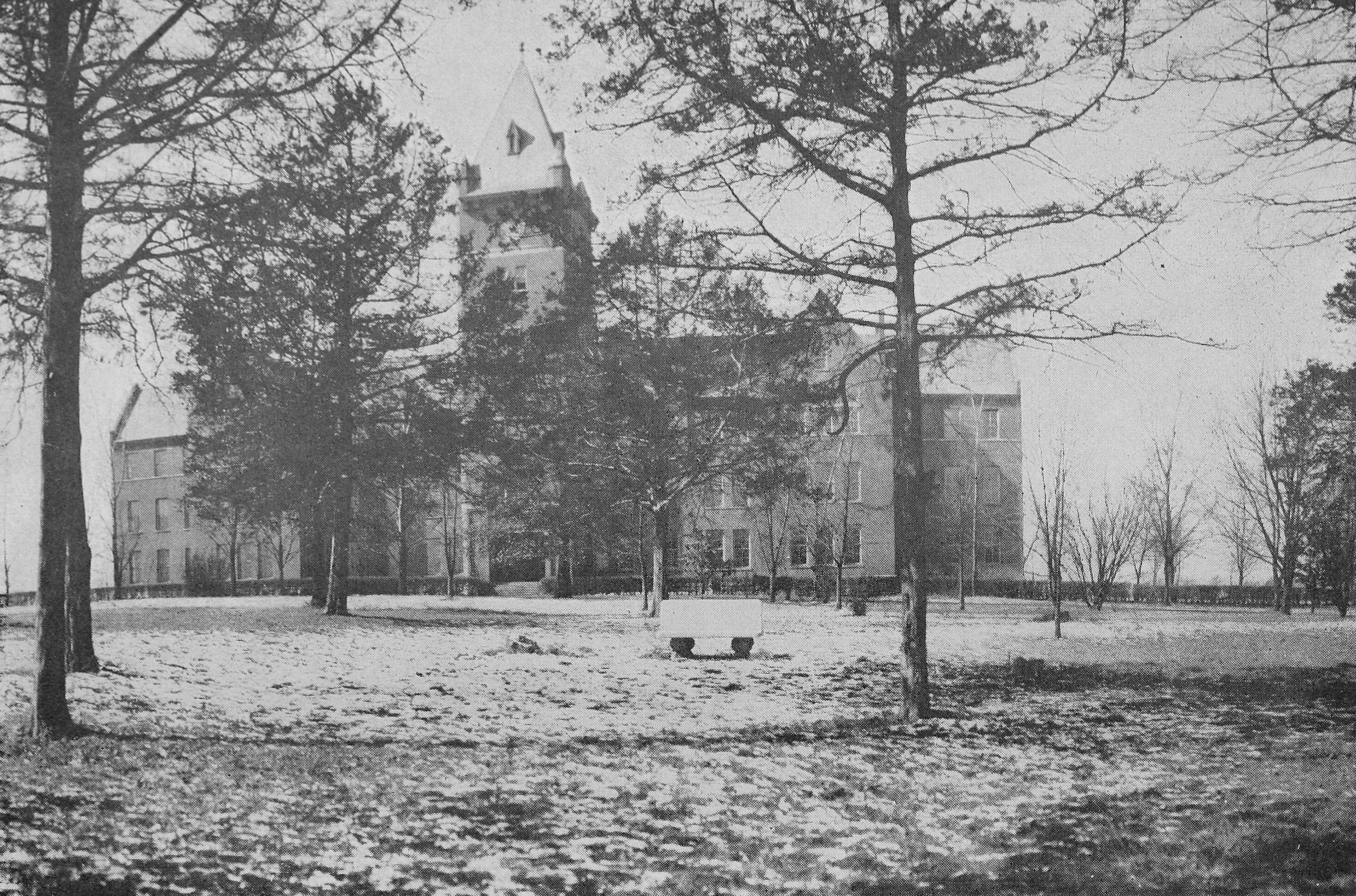
Memorial Hall, 1918

=== 1842–1861 ===
The university was founded by the Cumberland Presbyterian Church in 1842 and received its Tennessee state charter in 1843. In 1847, Cumberland Presbyterian church leaders added a law school, the first in Tennessee and the first west of the Appalachian Mountains, and in 1854 a school of theology was begun.

The original building, designed by Philadelphia architect William Strickland, housed schools of art, law and theology.

=== Civil War ===
The Civil War nearly destroyed Cumberland University. University Hall was burned to the ground by Confederate forces under the command of General Joseph Wheeler. Cumberland alumni William E. Ward wrote on a ruined Corinthian column the Latin phrase Ex Cineribus Resurgam (From the ashes I will arise). The university thereafter adopted the mythical phoenix as its symbol. By 1866, just one year after the war's end, all departments were again operating in various locations in the town of Lebanon.

Following the war, the university's faculty included former Confederate general A. P. Stewart, who taught there during his post-Civil War Union parole. Students included former Confederate general George Washington Gordon.

=== 1865–1930s ===
Cumberland University moved to its present campus location in 1892. Construction of Memorial Hall, designed by William Crawford Smith, was completed in 1896; it remains the tallest building on campus as of January 2022.

The university fell on hard times during the Great Depression, as did most small private colleges.

=== World War II ===
During World War II, Cumberland University served as the headquarters for the Tennessee Maneuver Area, a training area for the Second Army whose geography resembled that of Belgium, France, and Germany. Over 850,000 soldiers participated in the seven training exercises conducted in the area.

=== Sale of the law school and junior college years ===
After World War II, Cumberland experienced several changes in sponsorship and programs. In 1946, the Tennessee Baptist Convention assumed control of the school, ending a century of operation by the Cumberland Presbyterian Church. An attempt to merge Cumberland University and Tennessee School for Women during this period ultimately proved unsuccessful.

In 1951, the Tennessee Baptist Convention closed the College of Arts and Sciences and operated only the School of Law. In 1956, the Board of Trust secured an amendment to the Charter and changed Cumberland to a private, independent corporation. The College of Arts and Sciences was reopened as a two-year junior college, known as Cumberland College of Tennessee. In 1962, the assets of the School of Law were transferred to Howard College, now known as Samford University, in Birmingham, Alabama; the law school is now known as the Cumberland School of Law.

=== Reinstatement and growth as a university ===
The Board of Trustees expanded the academic programs of the junior college in 1982, returning Cumberland to a four-year degree institution. It resumed the old name of Cumberland University. Since then, Cumberland has expanded its academic program to include new majors and specialized student-learning opportunities.

=== Presidents ===
- Franceway Ranna Cossitt, 1842–1844
- Thomas C. Anderson, 1844–1866
- Benjamin Wilburn McDonnold, 1866–1873
- Nathan Green Jr., 1873–1902
- David Earle Mitchell, 1902–1906
- Nathan Green Jr. (Acting), 1906–1909
- Winstead Paine Bone, 1909–1914
- Samuel Andrew Coile, 1914–1916
- Homer Allin Hill (Acting), 1916–1917
- Edward Powell Childs, 1917–1920
- Andrew Blake Buchanan (Acting), 1920–1922
- John Royal Harris, 1922–1926
- Ernest Looney Stockton, 1926–1941
- Laban Lacy Rice, 1941–1946
- Edwin Smith Preston, 1946–1950
- W. Edwin Richardson, 1950–1952
- Sam B. Gilreath, 1952–1956
- Charles B. Havens, 1956–1958
- Ernest Looney Stockton Jr., 1958–1983
- Robert N. Clement, 1983–1988
- M. Walker Buckalew, 1988–1991
- J. Thomas Mills, 1991–1992
- Ray C. Phillips, 1992–1995
- Clair Martin, 1995–2000
- Charlene Kozy, 2000–2004
- Harvill C. Eaton, 2004–2015
- Paul C. Stumb IV, 2015 – present

== Cumberland School of Law ==
In 1847, Cumberland Presbyterian church leaders added the Cumberland School of Law, the first law school in Tennessee and the first west of the Appalachian Mountains. For many years the law school was located in historic Caruthers Hall, named for Robert Looney Caruthers, a founder of Cumberland University.

The trustees sold the School of Law and its assets in 1962 to what is now Samford University in Birmingham, Alabama. The Cumberland School of Law continues to operate there.

== Community outreach ==
Cumberland University has a Circle K club, which is affiliated with Kiwanis International. On February 13, 2010, Cumberland University hosted a conference basketball game, and donated half of its gate admissions to Sherry's Run, a non-profit organization created to benefit people with cancer. Also, the Cumberland University cycling team formed its own chapter of local non-profit organization Ride for Reading.

== Greek life ==
The university has three sororities and five fraternities. The sororities include the Lambda Omicron chapter of Alpha Omicron Pi and the Delta Mu chapter of Alpha Sigma Tau as well as Zeta Phi Beta (NPHC). The fraternities include the Theta Prime chapter of Kappa Sigma, the Nu chapter of Sigma Chi. There are 3 NPHC fraternities: Gamma Rho Gamma chapter of Phi Beta Sigma, the Phi Delta Delta chapter of Omega Psi Phi and the Rho Rho chapter of Kappa Alpha Psi.

== Athletics ==
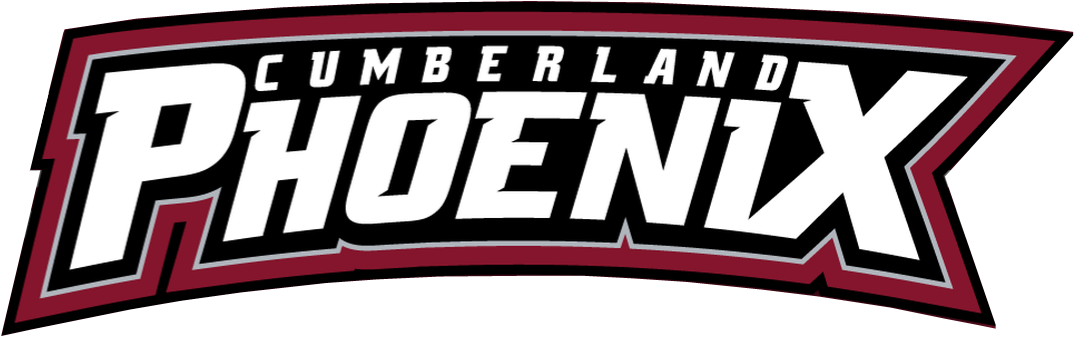
Cumberland athletics wordmark

The Cumberland athletic teams are called the Phoenix (formerly known as the Bulldogs until 2016). The university is a member of the National Association of Intercollegiate Athletics (NAIA), primarily competing in the Mid-South Conference (MSC) since the 2012–13 school year; which they were a member on a previous stint from 1996–97 to 2001–02. The Phoenix previously competed in the TranSouth Athletic Conference (TranSouth or TSAC) from 2002–03 to 2011–12; and in the Tennessee Collegiate Athletic Conference (TCAC) from 1986–87 to 1995–96.

Cumberland competes in 23 intercollegiate varsity sports. Men's sports include baseball, basketball, bowling, cross country, football, golf, soccer, tennis, track & field, volleyball and wrestling; while women's sports include basketball, bowling, cross country, golf, soccer, softball, tennis, track & field and volleyball. Co-ed sports include cheerleading, dance and eSports.

=== Sports Hall of Fame ===
The Cumberland University Sports Hall of Fame consists of individuals who have achieved excellence in athletics by either competing, coaching, or contributing in other ways. Members include those who only made an athletic impact at the university, such as volleyball player and coach Kathy Palk Slaughter and coach/contributor Mitch Walters, as well as others who went on to greater athletic notoriety at other institutions, such as Coastal Carolina University men's basketball coach Cliff Ellis and Winthrop University women's basketball coach Bud Childers. Still others, such as Allison B. Humphreys Jr. and Cale Young Rice, are remembered today for their non-athletic contributions.

=== Attempt to move to NCAA Division II ===
On August 7, 2013, Cumberland University was granted provisional membership into the Great Midwest Athletic Conference (G-MAC) after a vote of league presidents, paving the way for the university to apply to the National Collegiate Athletic Association (NCAA) for admittance into Division II in February 2014. Cumberland's application to join Division II was denied in 2014. As of 2024, Cumberland has not yet re-applied to transition into NCAA Division II.

=== Nickname ===
On January 4, 2016, Cumberland University changed the sports nickname of its athletic program from "Bulldogs" to "Phoenix", stating that, "For more than 150 years, the Phoenix has personified the spirit of Cumberland University."

=== Football ===
Cumberland football began on October 26, 1894, with a 6–6 tie with Peabody and finished that first year with a 2–1–1 season record. The pinnacle of the early days of CU football was the 1903 season that began with a (6–0) win over Vanderbilt then a (0–6) loss to Sewanee and continued with a five-day road trip with victories over Alabama (44–0) November 14, 1903, LSU (41–0) November 16, 1903, and Tulane (28–0) November 18, 1903. Cumberland played a postseason game against Coach John Heisman's Clemson team on Thanksgiving Day that ended in an 11–11 tie and a record of 4–1–1. This gave Coach A.L. Phillips and Cumberland University the Championship of the Southern Intercollegiate Athletic Association.

The 1916 game against Georgia Tech is famous as the most lopsided loss in the history of college football, with Georgia Tech defeating Cumberland 222-0.

=== Baseball ===
Cumberland's baseball program won the NAIA World Series following the 2004, 2010, and 2014 seasons; the 1995 and 2006 teams were runners-up in this event.

From 1980 to 2021, Woody Hunt served as head coach of the Cumberland baseball program, compiling a 1,630-774-5 record. He was named NAIA National Coach of the Year in 2006 and was runner-up for the award four times. Hunt was inducted into the American Baseball Coaches Association Hall of Fame (2013), the Boyle County (Kentucky) Sports Hall of Fame, the Cumberland University Hall of Fame, the NAIA Hall of Fame (2007), and the Tennessee Baseball Coaches Hall of Fame (2009). The NAIA awarded Hunt the 2019 Robert E. "Ish" Smith Award, and the Tennessee Sports Hall of Fame awarded him the Pat Summitt Lifetime Achievement Award in 2020.

Three Cumberland baseball players have played for MLB teams: Jack Farmer, Luis Martinez, and Aaron Wilkerson.

=== Basketball ===
The women's basketball team finished as NAIA National Tournament Runner-Up in 2007 and made it to the semifinals in 2013.

The men's basketball team earned trips to the NAIA National Tournament following the 2004, 2008, and 2009 seasons.

On August 17, 2018, the university named the basketball court in Dallas Floyd Phoenix Arena after Cliff Ellis, who coached Cumberland to a 78-12 record from 1973 to 1975.

=== Soccer ===
The 2014 women's team reached the NAIA quarterfinals, and the 2017 team went undefeated in the regular season before losing in the Mid-South Conference finals.

The men's team won the 2017 Mid-South Conference Tournament.

=== Wrestling ===
The wrestling program has produced four individual champions: Keith Cupp (174 lbs.), 2005; Corey Bleaken (157 lbs.), 2011; and Jake Williams (149 lbs.), 2014 and 2015.

=== Other sports ===
Cumberland achieved a top-ten finish at the National Collegiate Cycling Association's National Championship. Cumberland achieved a National Tournament appearance for the No. 16-ranked Men's Tennis Team in 2022.

== Notable alumni ==
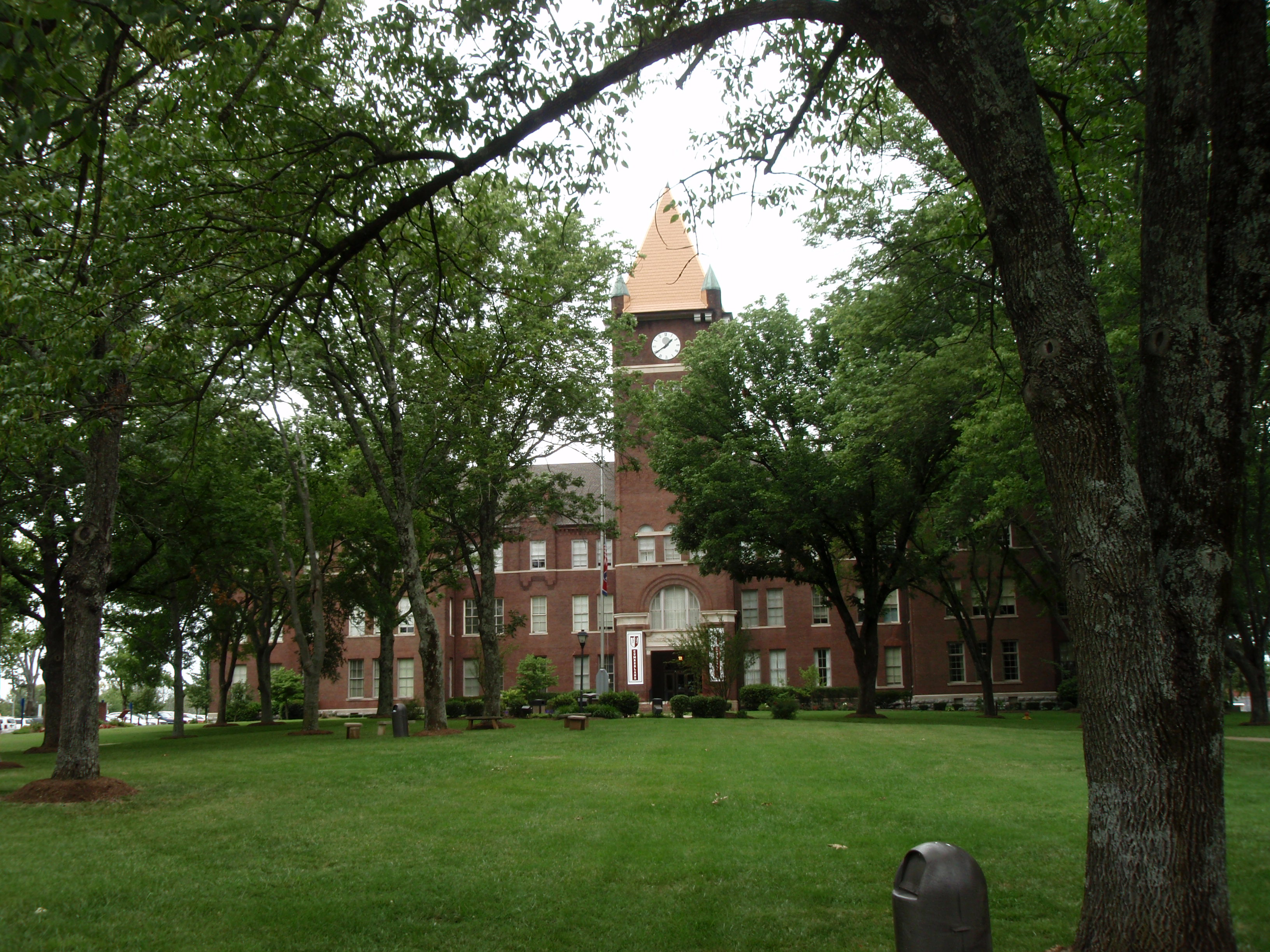
Memorial Hall

Cumberland University alumni include a U.S. Secretary of State, two U.S. Supreme Court justices, dozens of members of Congress, prominent social activists, significant military figures, and notable contributors to business, humanities, education, and the arts.
