= Simmons Jones Baker =

American politician

Member of the North Carolina Senate Representing Martin County
- In office 1816–1818
- Governor: William Miller then John Branch
- Preceded by: Jeremiah Slade
- Succeeded by: William Darlett

Member of the North Carolina House of Commons Representing Martin County
- In office 1814–1816 Serving with John Guyther (1814) and Gabriel L. Stewart (1815)
- Governor: William Miller
- Preceded by: Andrew Joyner / Joel Cherry
- Succeeded by: Joel Cherry

Personal details
- Born: February 15, 1775 Hertford County, North Carolina, British America
- Died: August 18, 1853 (aged 78) Raleigh, North Carolina, U.S.
- Resting place: Scotland Neck, North Carolina, Private cemetery with large monument
- Education: Royal College of Surgeons of Edinburgh and others
- Occupation: Physician
- Notes

Simmons Jones Baker (February 15, 1775 – August 18, 1853) was a medical doctor, planter and legislator in North Carolina.

== Early life and education ==
Baker was born in Hertford County on February 15, 1775, to Lawrence Baker and Ann Jones. His mother died when he was quite young and he therefore lived for part of his childhood with an aunt in Southampton County, Virginia. During this time he attended the same school run by Rev. Henry John Burges that William Henry Harrison attended.

Baker traveled to Great Britain in 1793 at the age of eighteen to study medicine. As was customary at the time there is no evidence of him ever earning a medical degree. However, he did receive certificates from two of the more famous medical facilities in Britain at the time: St Thomas' Hospital in London and the Royal College of Surgeons of Edinburgh.

During this trip he carried with him an armorial seal that had been passed down through his family. He took the seal to the College of Arms to inquire if any living Bakers in England were still using the same arms. The only one was Sir George Baker, the physician of King George III. Baker visited this Dr. Baker on a future trip to consult about a personal illness. The consultation was success and in gratitude he would later name his first son George.

== Adulthood ==
Baker returned from his medical studies in Britain in 1795 and married, in October of that year, Polly Smith of Halifax County. The couple built a house named Greenwood in 1796 on the plantation given to them by Polly's grandfather near the current town of Scotland Neck. Four years later he sold that plantation and moved to Martin County. Baker was made a trustee of the State Bank of North Carolina in 1811. Polly Smith Baker died in 1812 following the birth of their eighth child.

In 1814 Baker was remarried to Ann Cleverius who died in 1843.

Baker moved to Florida in 1828 and acquired a large amount of land near the present town of Marianna where he lived intermittently with Raleigh for a decade, ultimately staying in Raleigh until his death.

== Legislator ==
Baker represented Martin County in the State House of Commons (now known as the State House of Representatives) from 1814 to 1816 and then in the State Senate from 1816 to 1818. While in the Senate Baker was in a group who, in excitement over the news of the Erie Canal, investigated the possibility of constructing a canal from Raleigh to Asheville. The plan was ultimately abandoned. Baker was also involved in the legislation that created the Supreme Court of North Carolina.

== Freemason ==
Baker was initiated into Freemasonry in 1812 in Concord Lodge No. 58 in Tarboro. His lodge elected him to represent them at the Grand Lodge assembly in 1814. He would later be elected Grand Master of the state of North Carolina in 1832 and again in 1840. It was in this capacity that Baker laid the cornerstone of the state capitol building in Raleigh on July 4, 1833.

== Physician, Educator, Religious Layman ==
The oral tradition in the region indicates Dr. Baker was a well known and well respected physician, but there is little evidence to prove this. He was however made an honorary member of the North Carolina Medical Society when it was formed in 1849 and two of his sons-in-law and his ward were all physicians, likely his students.

In the field of education, Baker served as trustee of the Vine Hill Academy when it was first chartered in 1809 as well as serving as a trustee of the University of North Carolina from 1812 until his death.

Within the Episcopal Church Baker was one of the founders of Trinity Church in Scotland Neck, North Carolina as well as St. Luke's Church in Marianna, Florida.

== Legacy ==
Dr. Baker died on August 18, 1853, in Raleigh leaving behind eight adult children including his oldest son James Lawrence George Baker, who was a member of the North Carolina General Assembly in 1832, and Simmons Jones Baker Jr., who was one of the signers of the Ordinance of the Secession of Florida in January 1861. Through Simmons Baker Jr.'s influence in the area, the town of Greenwood, Florida was named for his father's plantation in Halifax County, North Carolina.

Baker also left behind 163 slaves when he died who were carefully appraised by the executors of his estate. He furthermore provided for the maintenance of superannuated (retired due to age or infirmity) slaves in his will.
