= James Wickliffe Axtell =

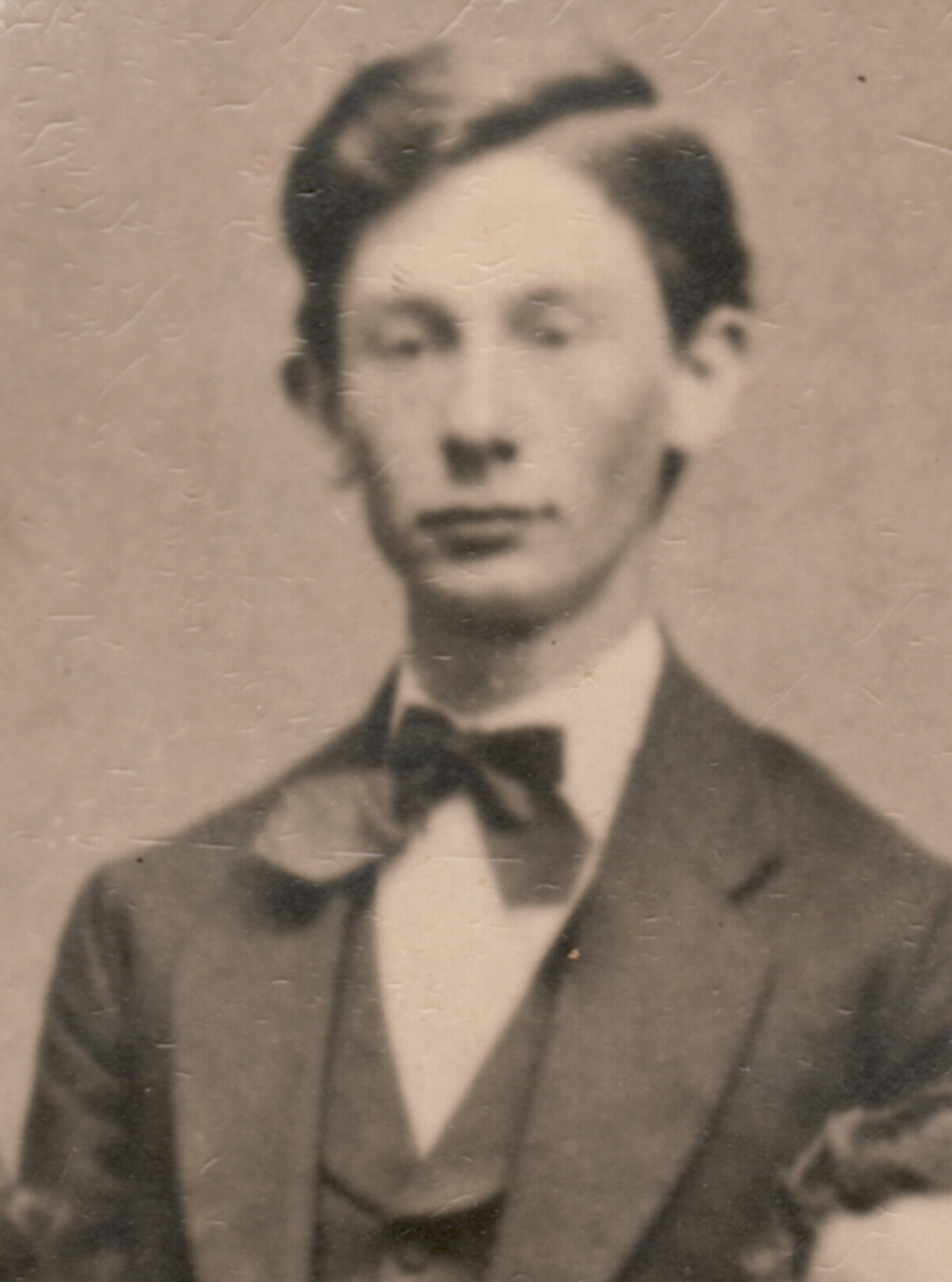
James Wickliffe Axtell

James Wickliffe Axtell (April 16, 1852 – December 23, 1909) was a newspaper man and prominent member of the Cumberland Presbyterian Church.

== Biography ==
Axtell was born in Pennsylvania, the son of the Rev. Dr. Philip Axtell who founded a number of Cumberland Presbyterian Church congregations in Pennsylvania, most notably the First Cumberland Presbyterian Church in Pittsburgh. An alternative spelling of his name is James Wycliffe Axtell.

Beginning at about age thirteen, James worked in the Waynesburg, Pennsylvania, printing office and set type for The Cumberland Presbyterian, the official newspaper of the Cumberland Presbyterian Church denomination. After graduating from Waynesburg University, a Cumberland Presbyterian Church institution, he was one of the founders of the Waynesburg Independent. He also helped to establish the National Stockman and Farmer which became one of America's primary agricultural newspapers. For about twenty-two years Axtell was either editor, manager, or managing editor.

J. W. Axtell married Mary Helen "Nellie" Minor in 1874. They had two sons, Philip Phillips Axtell and Clay Minor Axtell, and one daughter, Clara Eliza Axtell who married Charles Poynter.

In 1898, Axtell accepted the position of business manager with the St. Louis Observer. On the death of the paper's editor/publisher David Madison Harris in 1900, Axtell became The Observer's managing editor. Later in 1900, with the sale of The Observer to the Cumberland Presbyterian Publishing House, Axtell accepted a similar position in connection with The Cumberland Presbyterian newspaper (now relocated to Nashville, Tennessee). A year later he was made General Manager of the Cumberland Presbyterian Publishing House.

Axtell had been a member of the Shady Avenue Cumberland Presbyterian Church in Pittsburgh soon after its organization, and for eight years was the successful superintendent of Shady Avenue's Sunday school. From this experience he authored several books about Christian education. Axtell remained manager of the Cumberland Presbyterian Publishing House until poor health forced his resignation in 1908. He died on December 23, 1909.

== Books by James Wickliffe Axtell ==
- Axtell, J. W. The Organized Sunday School: A Working Manual for Officers, Nashville, Tenn.: The Cumberland Press, 1902.
- Axtell, J. W. The Teaching Problem: A Message to Sunday School Workers. Nashville, Tenn.: The Cumberland Press, 1902.

== Sources ==
- The Cumberland Presbyterian, April 19, 1900, page 483.
- The Cumberland Presbyterian, December 30, 1909, page 821
