= Thomas Hardesty Campbell =

Presbyterian minister

Thomas Hardesty Campbell (1907–1989) was a Cumberland Presbyterian minister, a former president and dean of Memphis Theological Seminary, and a former director of the Historical Foundation of the Cumberland Presbyterian Church.

Campbell retired from the seminary in 1974 and served seven years as pastor of the Harrison, Arkansas, Cumberland Presbyterian Church; he was moderator of the General Assembly of the Cumberland Presbyterian Church in 1973, and was a member of White River Presbytery in Arkansas, for many years. Campbell was married to Margaret and they had four children.

Campbell wrote several books relating to the history of the Cumberland Presbyterian denomination, including Good News on the Frontier. He also contributed to A People Called Cumberland Presbyterians, the definitive history of that denomination. His last work was Winds of Doctrine (1986), detailing his experience with a variety of theological movements which have influenced the church in the sixty years of his ministry.

== Publications ==
- A History of the Cumberland Presbyterian Church in Texas (1936)
- Studies in Cumberland Presbyterian History (1944)
- Good News on the Frontier (1962)
- A People Called Cumberland Presbyterian (1972)
- A Handbook on New Testament Theology (1973)
- Arkansas Cumberland Presbyterians (1985)
- Winds of Doctrine (1989)
- For the Building Up of the Church (1995)

At the time of his death, Dr. Campbell was working on Why I Am a Cumberland Presbyterian.
