= Cumberland Presbyterian Church in America =

African-American Presbyterian denomination

- Classification: Protestant
- Theology: New School Presbyterian; Scougalism
- Governance: Neo-Presbyterian
- Associations: World Communion of Reformed Churches
- Region: United States
- Origin: 1874; Huntsville, Alabama
- Separated from: Cumberland Presbyterian Church
- Congregations: 153

The Cumberland Presbyterian Church in America is a historically African-American denomination which developed from the Cumberland Presbyterian Church in 1874.

== History ==
The church was formed after African-American delegates to the Cumberland Presbyterian Church's May 1869 General Assembly asked for assistance in organizing a separate body for African Americans, allowing them to become more independent and self-reliant, develop their own clergy and other leaders, and maintain their own church buildings, all with financial support from the parent denomination. The new church was organized in May 1874 as the Colored Cumberland Presbyterian Church. It later was known as the Second Cumberland Presbyterian Church before assuming its current name in 1992.

Relations between the two Cumberland Presbyterian groups have for the most part been very cordial, and many of the CPCA ministers have trained at Memphis Theological Seminary. A reunion attempt on the part of both denominations failed to win approval in the late 1980s. The African American church wanted equal representation on all boards and agencies, feeling that otherwise they would be swallowed up by the larger white church. The joint committee drafting the plan of union agreed and made such a stipulation in its reporting to the General Assembly. However, many in the white, rural, southern-based church were not willing to cede that much power and balked at the plan. Both denominations are now working on a plan of organic merger. The two denominations continue to share a Confession of Faith and cooperate in many common ministries.

== Organization and membership ==
Denominational headquarters are located in Huntsville, Alabama. There are 153 congregations, which are organized into 15 presbyteries and four synods, in Alabama, Kentucky, Tennessee and Texas and Illinois. Membership is primarily concentrated in Alabama, Tennessee, and Texas, but the church extends north to Cleveland, Chicago, Oklahoma, Detroit and Marshalltown, Iowa.

== Governance ==
The church adheres to the Presbyterian Church governance. It has 4 Synods, the Texas Synod has 3 Presbyteries namely the Angelina (26 churches), Brazos River (58) and East Texas (4) Presbyteries. The Tennessee Synod has 3 Presbyteries, the Elk River (11), Hiawassee (9), New Hopewell Presbyteries (11). The Kentucky Synod has 3, the Cleveland Ohio (4), the Kansouri (12), and the Ohio (5), the Purchase (5) Presbyteries. The biggest synod is Alabama Synod with 6 Presbyteries, namely the Birmingham (6), the Florence (5), Huntsville (68), South Alabama (16), Tennessee Valley (8) and Tuscaloosa (7) Presbyteries.

== Unification issues ==
In 2012 the general assemblies of both the Cumberland Presbyterian Church and the Cumberland Presbyterian Church in America agreed to the forming of a unification task force, to pursue organic union.
