= William Horn Battle =

American judge

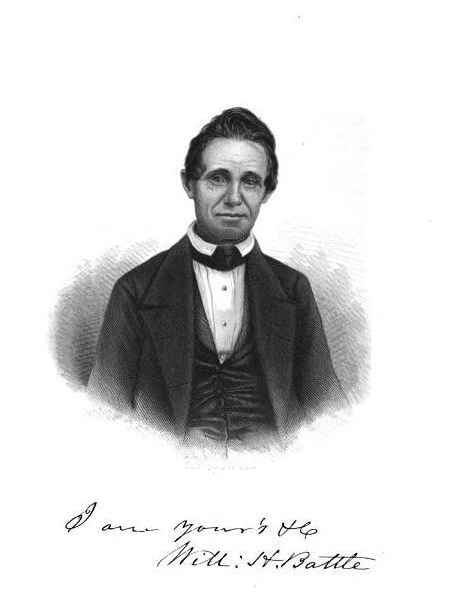
- A circa 1854 portrait of Battle

Associate Justice of the North Carolina Supreme Court
- In office 1852–1867
- Appointed by: William Alexander Graham
- Preceded by: Joseph J. Daniel

William Horn Battle (1802–1879) was an American jurist and law professor who served on the North Carolina Supreme Court. He was also the father of Kemp P. Battle.

Battle was born in Edgecombe County, North Carolina and educated at Vine Hill Academy and the University of North Carolina at Chapel Hill. He became a lawyer after studying under Chief Justice Leonard Henderson. Battle also served as court reporter for the state Supreme Court, a member of the North Carolina House of Commons representing Franklin County, delegate to the 1839 Whig National Convention, and a state superior court judge. While living in Raleigh, he established a successful private law school. In 1843, he relocated this school to Chapel Hill. In 1845, he founded the University of North Carolina School of Law and became its first professor of law. Among his students were future Gov. Zebulon B. Vance and future state Supreme Court justices Joseph J. Davis, James E. Shepherd, and Walter Clark.

Battle was appointed to serve on the state Supreme Court by Governor William Alexander Graham in 1848 until the legislature could meet to select a replacement for Judge Joseph J. Daniel. The legislators did not elect Battle to continue in office at this time, but they chose him to fill a seat on the court in 1852. He served on the Supreme Court until 1868, when he returned to the practice of law. Battle later served as president of a bank and as dean of the University of North Carolina School of Law from 1877 until his death. During this time, his son served as president of the University of North Carolina at Chapel Hill.

Battle is buried in Historic Oakwood Cemetery in Raleigh, North Carolina.
