= Louisa Woosley =

American minister (1862–1952)

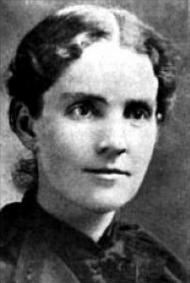
- Louisa Woosley in 1891

Personal life
- Born: March 24, 1862
- Died: July 30, 1952 (aged 90)

Religious life
- Religion: Christianity
- Denomination: Cumberland Presbyterian Church
- Ordination: November 5, 1889

Louisa Mariah Layman Woosley (March 24, 1862 – June 30, 1952) was the first woman ordained as a minister in any Presbyterian denomination. She was ordained by the Cumberland Presbyterian Church on November 5, 1889.

== Ordained ministry ==
Woosley, a Cumberland Presbyterian from Kentucky, was ordained by Nolin Presbytery (Kentucky Synod) in that denomination on Tuesday, November 5, 1889. Although the constitution of the Cumberland Presbyterian Church did not exclude women from ordination, neither did it include them. A great controversy developed in various church judicatories over the legality of her ordination. Eventually, Kentucky Synod of the Cumberland Presbyterian Church instructed Nolin Presbytery to remove Louisa Woosley from their rolls. This the presbytery did by granting her the status of minister in transitu ("lettering her out" in presbyterian terms) to another presbytery. Clearly, although Nolin Presbytery complied with the instructions of the superior judicatory, they had denied their intent.

In 1891, Woosley published her only book, 'Shall Woman Preach (1891 book)' which explained and justified her position.

Louisa Woosley, with the aid of various Kentucky presbyteries sympathetic to her cause, outlasted the synodic objection to her ordination. In 1906, the partial reunion of the Cumberland Presbyterian Church with the Presbyterian Church USA removed some of the most vocal opposition to the ordination of women. Although the official position of the denomination remained unchanged, clergy women were able to participate in all levels of polity without a great deal of opposition. In 1920, the Cumberland Presbyterian denomination ruled that the word "man" as used in its constitution was to be considered as a gender neutral reference to a human being. More recently gender inclusive language came into broader use in the denomination.

Almost a hundred years after Woosley's ordination, the Cumberland Presbyterian Church elected their first female General Assembly moderator, Beverly St. John, in 1988.

== Earlier ordinations ==
In the entire Reformed tradition, only Antoinette Brown, a Congregationalist, can claim an earlier ordination in 1853. However, Brown's ordination was never recognized by the Congregational denomination and she later departed for the Unitarian Church. Woosley, on the other hand, was eventually recognized as a legitimate member of the Cumberland Presbyterian clergy and served in a variety of church offices for over 50 years.
