= Trinity Episcopal Church (Scotland Neck, North Carolina) =

Historic church in North Carolina, United States

- U.S. National Register of Historic Places
- Location within North Carolina Location within the United States
- Location: East side of US 258, 0.6 miles (0.97 km) south of the junction with SR 1118, near Scotland Neck, North Carolina
- Coordinates: 36°8′19″N 77°24′56″W
- Area: 5 acres (2.0 ha)
- Built: 1855
- Architect: Wills, Frank; Cheshire, Joseph Blount
- Architectural style: Gothic Revival
- NRHP reference No.: 80002843
- Added to NRHP: November 25, 1980

Trinity Episcopal Church is a historic Episcopal church located near Scotland Neck, Halifax County, North Carolina, United States. The congregation was founded in February 1833 by a number of prominent citizens including State Senator Simmons Baker. It was built in 1855, and is a rectangular Gothic Revival style brick building. Its design is attributed to noted New York architect Frank Wills. It has a gable roof, front central tower, and lancet windows. The church was rebuilt after it burned in 1885.

It was listed on the National Register of Historic Places in 1980.
