= Thomas J. Campbell =

Thomas J. Campbell may refer to:

- Thomas J. Campbell (American football) (1886–1972), American football player and coach
- Thomas Jefferson Campbell (1793–1850), U.S. congressman from Tennessee
- Thomas Joseph Campbell (1871–1946), Irish politician, newspaper editor and judge
- Thomas J. Campbell (university president) (1848–1925), president of St. John's College (now Fordham University) in New York
- Tom Campbell (California politician) (born 1952), American economist and California state official
- Tom Campbell (Canadian politician) (1927–2012), mayor of Vancouver, British Columbia

== See also ==
- Thomas Campbell (disambiguation)
