= John Stiles =

Canadian writer

John Stiles was born and raised in the Annapolis Valley in Nova Scotia, Canada. He is the author of the poetry collections Scouts are Cancelled and Creamsicle Stick Shivs, as well as the novels The Insolent Boy and Taking the Stairs. Featured on CBC's 'Q', Much Music, and TVO's 'Imprint', Stiles has also written for The Globe and Mail and The Literary Review of Canada. A documentary about Stiles and his poems in Scouts are Cancelled was festival pick in the Hot Docs festival in Toronto 2007 and won best Canadian documentary award in The Atlantic Film Festival in September 2007. Stiles lives with his wife in London, England.

== Poetry ==
- Creamsicle Stick Shivs, (Insomniac Press, 2006)
- Scouts are Cancelled, (Insomniac Press, 2002)

== Novels ==
- Taking the Stairs, (Nightwood Editions, 2008)
- The Insolent Boy, (Insomniac Press, 2001)

== Anthologies ==
- Poet's Quest for God: 21st Century poems of faith doubt and wonder (Eyewear, UK, 2016)
- Outside Voices 2008 Anthology of Younger Poets (Outside Voices, 2008)
- Babylon Burning: 9/11 Five Years On (nthposition UK, 2006)
- New American Writing (Oink! Press, USA, 2005)
- Doom, Desire and Vice, (Wingate Press, CANADA, 2005)
- The I.V. Lounge Reader, (Insomniac Press, CANADA, 2001)

== Film ==
Scouts are Cancelled

the smalls...er whatever
