= Cumberland Presbyterian Church =

Presbyterian denomination

- Classification: Protestant
- Orientation: New School Presbyterian; Scougalism
- Polity: Presbyterian
- Associations: World Communion of Reformed Churches, World Council of Churches
- Region: United States, Hong Kong, Colombia, Guatemala, Mexico, Haiti, Brazil, Spain, Australia, the Philippines, Cambodia, Japan, Macau, South Korea
- Origin: February 4, 1810; Dickson County, Tennessee
- Separated from: Presbyterian Church in the United States of America
- Separations: Cumberland Presbyterian Church in America (separated 1878); just over half of the Cumberland Presbyterian congregations rejoined the PCUSA in 1906
- Congregations: 673 (2023)
- Members: 33 223 active members (2023)

The Cumberland Presbyterian Church is a Presbyterian denomination spawned by the Second Great Awakening. In 2023, it had 33,223 active members and 646 congregations. The word Cumberland comes from the Cumberland River valley where the church was founded.

== History ==
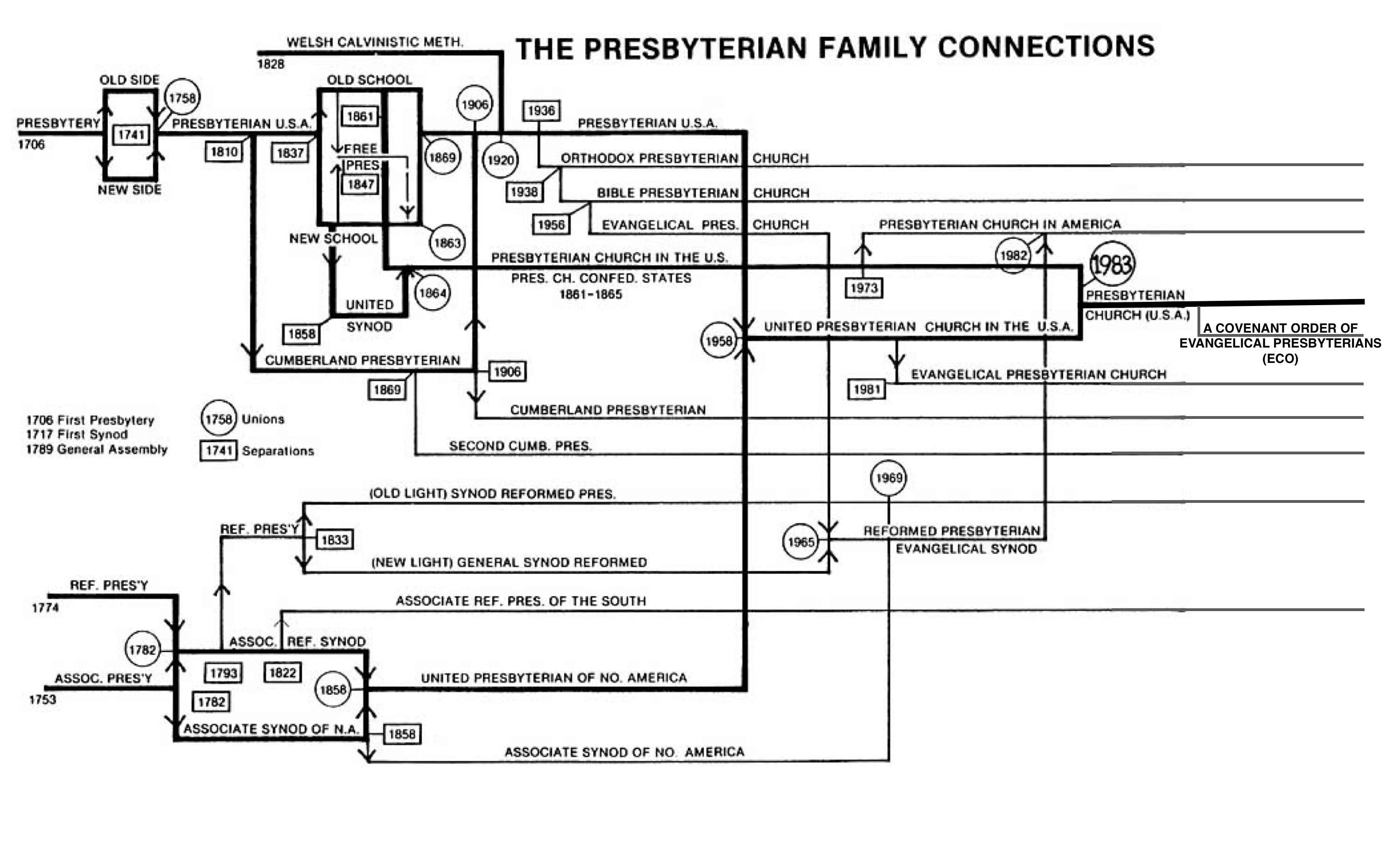
In 1810, the Cumberland Presbyterians split from the P.C.U.S.A, 27 years prior to the 1837 schism between New School and Old School Presbyterians.

=== Formation ===
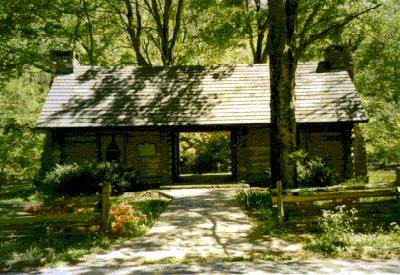
Replica of the log house in Dickson County, Tennessee, where the Cumberland Presbyterian Church was founded in 1810. The structure sits in the midst of the Montgomery Bell State Park.

The divisions which led to the formation of the Cumberland Presbyterian Church can be traced back to the First Great Awakening. At that time, Presbyterians in North America split between the Old Side (mainly congregations of Scottish and Scotch-Irish extraction) who favored a doctrinally oriented church with a highly educated ministry and a New Side (mainly of English extraction) who put greater emphasis on the experiential techniques championed by the Great Awakening. The formal split between Old Side and New Side lasted only from 1741 to 1758, but the two orientations remained present in the reunified church and would come to the fore again during the Second Great Awakening.

At the beginning of the nineteenth century, Presbyterians on the frontier suffered from a shortage of educated clergy willing to move to the frontier beyond the Appalachian Mountains. At the same time, Methodists and Baptists were sending preachers with little or no formal training into frontier regions and were very successful in organizing Methodist and Baptist congregations. Drawing on New Side precedents, Cumberland Presbytery in Kentucky began ordaining men without the educational background required by the Kentucky Synod. This move agitated supporters of the Old Side, but what exacerbated tensions further was when the presbytery allowed ministers to offer a qualified assent to the Westminster Confession, only requiring them to swear assent to the Confession "so far as they deemed it agreeable to the Word of God". Old Siders in the Kentucky Synod (which had oversight over Cumberland Presbytery) sought to discipline the presbytery. Presbytery and synod were involved in a protracted dispute which touched upon the nature of ecclesiastical jurisdiction. Ultimately, the synod decided to dissolve Cumberland Presbytery and expel a number of its ministers.

The Cumberland Presbyterian denomination was made up of the expelled members of the Presbyterian Church in the United States of America (PCUSA) and others in the area when the Kentucky Synod dissolved the original Cumberland Presbytery. There is historical evidence in the writings of several of the founders that indicate they did not intend the split to be permanent and certainly did not anticipate a long-standing separate denomination.

On February 4, 1810, near what later became Burns, Tennessee, in the log cabin home of the Rev. Samuel McAdow, he, the Rev. Finis Ewing and the Rev. Samuel King reorganized Cumberland Presbytery. After rapid growth, Cumberland Presbytery became Cumberland Synod in 1813 and the Cumberland Presbyterian denomination in 1829 when the General Assembly of the Cumberland Presbyterian Church was established.

A replica of the Rev. Samuel McAdow's cabin now stands where the three founded the church, and a sandstone chapel commemorating the event has been erected nearby. These two buildings are two of the main attractions in the surrounding Montgomery Bell State Park. An outgrowth of the Great Revival of 1800, also called the Second Great Awakening, the new denomination arose to minister to the spiritual needs of a pioneer people who turned from the doctrine of predestination as they interpreted it to embrace the so-called "Whosoever Will" gospel of the new church. The Red River Meeting House in Logan County, Kentucky, marks the location of the revival meeting thought by some to have given rise to the first organized Cumberland Presbyterian congregation.

=== Subsequent history ===
In 1826, Cumberland Presbyterians established Cumberland College in Princeton, Kentucky, in order to better train their candidates for the ministry. Although very much a frontier institution, under the presidency of Franceway Ranna Cossitt, Cumberland College was one of the first colleges in the United States to accept women as students. Ann Harpending and Melinda Barnett, for example, enrolled in the very first class.

In 1829, the Cumberland Presbyterian Church established a newspaper, The Cumberland Presbyterian, which would eventually become the publication of record of the denomination and which, under several titles, has been in publication ever since. In the 20th century it became the Cumberland Presbyterian magazine. The Rev. Franceway Ranna Cossitt served as the first editor. Other editors have included the Rev. C. Ray Dobbins who served from 1948 through 1983 and was instrumental in the founding of the Associated Church Press. Matthew H. Gore has been editor since 2018.

The Cumberland Presbyterian Church in America, a primarily African-American denomination, split from the primarily white Cumberland Presbyterian Church in 1874. Relations between the two groups have for the most part been very cordial, and many of the CPCA ministers have trained at Memphis Theological Seminary. A reunion attempt on the part of both denominations failed to win approval in the late 1980s. The African American church wanted equal representation on all boards and agencies, feeling that otherwise they would be swallowed up by the larger white church. The joint committee drafting the plan of union agreed and made such a stipulation in its reporting to the General Assembly. However, many in the white, rural, southern-based church were not willing to cede that much power and balked at the plan. No other plans for union have been attempted. However, the two denominations share a confession of faith and cooperate in many common ministries.

In 1889, Cumberland Presbyterians were the first body in the Presbyterian or Reformed traditions to ordain a woman as a minister, Louisa Mariah Layman Woosley. A relatively conservative body, Nolin Presbytery, ordained Woosley while a relatively liberal body, Kentucky Synod, opposed her ordination and instructed the presbytery to remove her from the ministerial roll.

==== Upper Cumberland Presbyterian Church ====
The Upper Cumberland Presbyterian Church is a small denomination which broke off from the Cumberland Presbyterian church over issues of membership in the National Council of Churches and the use of the Revised Standard Version of the Bible; it has fewer than 1,000 members among twelve congregations in Alabama and Tennessee. The Upper Cumberland Presbyterian Church uses a slightly revised version of the 1883 Confession of Faith of the Cumberland Presbyterian Church (CPC); the main body of the CPC adopted a new Confession Of Faith in 1984. The seeds of the Upper Cumberland Presbyterian Church arose from a group known as the Fellowship of Cumberland Presbyterian Conservatives. Members of this group protested modernizing trends within that denomination, in particular the widespread usage of the Revised Standard Version of the Bible. The Fellowship of Cumberland Presbyterian Conservatives formed a conference and planned a second one in Memphis, Tennessee. When the CP General Assembly declared its actions to be unconstitutional, several leaders of the group left the CPC and formed the new Upper Cumberland Presbyterian Church. The Upper Cumberland part of the name refers to the fact that the denomination was established in Gallatin, Tennessee, on the Upper Cumberland River, the section of the Cumberland River east of Nashville, Tennessee. The King James Version is the official Bible of the denomination.

The Upper Cumberland Presbyterian congregations are mostly rural, country churches. They are located in three geographic areas: East of Nashville, South of Nashville and North Central Alabama. The representatives of the twelve congregations meet twice a year to form a presbytery. This is the highest church court of the denomination. There are no synods or general assemblies as in other Presbyterian bodies. A moderator of presbytery is elected for a six-month term. The denomination's official publication is called The Bulletin. The denomination does not have a college or seminary. Ministers are usually self-taught men who are then further trained by the Ministerial Training Committee. Some prominent ministers of the denomination have held other careers while serving as pastors.

=== Reunion ===
By 1900, the Cumberland Presbyterian Church was the third largest Presbyterian or Reformed body in the United States and was rapidly growing. After making revisions to the Westminster Confession in 1903, the PCUSA (the so-called "Northern" denomination) proposed reunification with the CPC. The General Assembly voted by a significant majority for the union in the 1906 meeting. As a result, a large number of Cumberland congregations re-entered the PCUSA in 1906 and those who remained in the Cumberland Presbyterian Church felt somewhat antagonistic towards the PCUSA for generations afterward. About 1,000 pastors and 90,000 former Cumberland Presbyterian Church members joined the Northern Presbyterian Church, but about 50,000 stayed out and continued on as Cumberland Presbyterian Church.

=== Recent history ===
The Presbyterian Church (U.S.A.), the Cumberland Presbyterian Church, and the Cumberland Presbyterian Church in America held concurrent 2006 general assemblies in Birmingham, Alabama in celebration of 300 years of Presbyterianism in North America. The confessional differences between the denominations that resulted in the CPC's split have largely disappeared. However, new differences have arisen such as the stances on homosexuality and views toward the scriptures. The CPC, for the most part, holds to more conservative beliefs than the Presbyterian Church (U.S.A.), with an orientation toward Arminianism as opposed to the strict Calvinism of other conservative Presbyterian churches in the U.S.

== Beliefs and practices ==
Cumberland Presbyterians were among the first denominations to admit women to their educational institutions and to accept them in leadership roles. They were the first to include women as ordained clergy. Cumberland Presbyterians were also early to ordain African-Americans to the ministry. The 1984 revision of the Cumberland Presbyterian Confession of Faith, reflecting the denomination's long-standing traditions, was one of the first inclusive confessional documents in the Reformed tradition. This Confession was revised by a broad composite of theologians of both Cumberland Presbyterian Churches.

However, for the most part, the CPC's constituency and theology resembles that of the United Methodist Church, appealing mainly to long-established families with revivalistic religious tastes and generally conservative cultural dispositions, derived chiefly from the agricultural orientation of most of its historic territory, the Upper South. Although explicit fundamentalism and liberalism are rare in the CPC, neither is entirely absent, and recent trends in the denomination seem to be moving it further towards traditionalism. As the denomination has become more conservative, some of its liberal ministers and members have transferred membership to the Presbyterian Church (USA), thereby intensifying already-present theological and social tendencies in the remaining CPC faithful toward evangelicalism.

== Structure ==
As with any church holding to a Presbyterian polity, individual congregations are represented by elders (who form a session to govern the local church) at presbyteries. Presbyteries, in turn, send delegates to synods. Finally, the entire structure is governed by the General Assembly. The Assembly charges various boards and agencies with the day-to-day operation of the denomination.

Cumberland Presbyterian congregations may be found throughout the U.S. as well as in several foreign countries (Japan, Hong Kong, Colombia, etc.) but are primarily located in the American South and border states, with strong concentrations in Tennessee, Kentucky, Alabama, Missouri, southern Illinois, Arkansas, and Texas. Many of those congregations are located outside major metropolitan areas, in small towns and rural communities. The majority of those churches founded in towns and cities in the 19th century joined in the union with the PCUSA in 1906 after the General Assembly voted to unite with that body. However, so did a fair number of the country churches, who were likely served at the time by pastors with relatively greater theological training, which would have been required by the mainstream Presbyterian tradition for admission to the ministry.

=== Presbyteries ===
==== Cumberland Presbytery, Cumberland Presbyterian Church, 1810–1813 ====
The genesis of the Cumberland Presbyterian Church was the reformed Cumberland Presbytery organized on February 4, 1810. The presbytery was made up of members of the Presbyterian Church and others in the area left abandoned when Kentucky Synod PCUSA dissolved the original Cumberland Presbytery and expelled many of its ministers. The new independent presbytery struggled to be reunited with the larger Presbyterian Church. At the same time, it grew rapidly and divided into three smaller presbyteries in 1813. Cumberland Presbytery was succeeded by Cumberland Synod.

==== Cumberland Presbytery, Cumberland Presbyterian Church, 1845–1988 ====
King Presbytery of the Cumberland Presbyterian Church met only three times in 1843 and 1844 before being renamed Cumberland Presbytery by Green River Synod in 1844. Located primarily in South-Central and Eastern Kentucky, this Cumberland Presbytery was a member judicatory of Green River Synod from 1844 to 1888 and of Kentucky Synod from 1888 to 1988. This Cumberland Presbytery was one of the best organized and funded of all Cumberland Presbyterian judicatories. After the partial reunion of the Cumberland Presbyterian Church and the Presbyterian Church in the United States of America in 1906, it was the financial stability of Cumberland Presbytery that enabled the Cumberland Presbyterian Denomination to survive. In 1988, as part of the Cumberland Presbyterian Church middle judicatory realignment, this Cumberland Presbytery was dissolved only to be reformed as a much larger presbytery. The last stated clerk was Rev. James W. Knight.

==== Cumberland Presbytery, Cumberland Presbyterian Church, 1988–present ====
Primarily located in central and eastern Kentucky with one congregation in Pennsylvania, Cumberland Presbytery forms the traditional heart of the Cumberland Presbyterian Church. This incarnation of the presbytery was formed in the Cumberland Presbyterian middle judicatory realignment of 1988. Cumberland Presbytery is a part of Midwest Synod of the Cumberland Presbyterian Church.

==== Kentucky Synod, Cumberland Presbyterian Church, 1845–1865 ====
Formed from Green River Synod in 1845 and dissolved back into Green River Synod in 1865. This Kentucky Synod's history is largely unknown. It was dissolved for repeatedly failing to meet.

==== Kentucky Synod, Cumberland Presbyterian Church 1888–1988 ====
In 1888, the name of Green River Synod was changed to Kentucky Synod. In 1988, Kentucky Synod merged with North Central Synod to form the Synod of the Midwest. Kentucky Synod was, perhaps, the best funded and organized of all Cumberland Presbyterian synods. Few other judicatories exercised synodic authority to the same degree. The synod maintained a "Center" in Bowling Green, Kentucky, and employed an executive and staff. The last Executive Presbyter was Rev. James W. Knight.

== Demographics ==
The Cumberland Presbyterian Church is present in 23 US states, mainly in the South. Tennessee has far the highest adherents rate 4.64 /1,000 people, about 30,000 members, followed by Kentucky with 10,000 members. Arkansas and Alabama has a large followers of the Cumberland Presbyterian Church represents both 1.23/1,000 adherents rate, with about 6,000 members in 59 churches in Alabama, and 3,600 members in 61 congregations in Arkansas. In the South churches are in Texas, Oklahoma, Louisiana, Mississippi, Georgia, Florida. The denomination is present also in Iowa, Missouri, Illinois, Indiana, Michigan, Maryland, Pennsylvania, New York, Massachusetts, New Jersey, New Mexico, Arizona and California.

The church has Korean language speaking Presbyteries.

== Schools and institutions ==
Prior to the 1906 partial union, the Cumberland Presbyterian Church placed a great deal of emphasis on education and sponsored 22 colleges and universities. All but one united with the Presbyterian Church. The denomination now maintains a single four-year liberal arts college, Bethel University, formerly Bethel College, located in McKenzie, Tennessee. Recently, the denomination has related to this institution through a covenant agreement, forgoing direct ownership and control. The denomination also operates a seminary, Memphis Theological Seminary, in Memphis, Tennessee. The Cumberland Presbyterian Center, also located in Memphis, houses other church boards and agencies. The denomination maintains a Children's Home in Denton, Texas. The Historical Foundation of the CPC and the CPCA maintains its library and archives at the Cumberland Presbyterian Center in Memphis.

In recent years, the denomination adopted an alternate educational route to ordination of ministers, known as the Program of Alternate Studies. PAS, as it became known, was intended to serve persons embarking on a second vocation but not as an alternate a seminary education. However, a larger and larger percentage of candidates for the ministry are being allowed by their presbyteries to choose this non-seminary route to ordination, prompting a debate over what many in the church regard as a lessening of educational standards. At the present rate, the number of Cumberland Presbyterian clergy ordained without a seminary degree will surpass seminary-trained clergy within a few years.

== Notable members ==
- James Wickliffe Axtell
- Richard Beard
- William Jennings Bryan, American politician
- Thomas Hardesty Campbell
- Franceway Ranna Cossitt (president of Cumberland College, 1st Stated Clerk, etc.)
- David Crockett (frontiersman, politician)
- America McCutchen Drennan (1830–1903), educator and missionary
- J.S. "Chris" Christie (Alabama Political Figure)
- Finis Ewing (founder)
- John Frizzell
- Matthew H. Gore (historian)
- Myles Horton
- William T. Ingram
- Samuel King (founder)
- James W. Knight
- Sylvanus Lowry
- Samuel McAdow (founder)
- Benjamin Wilburn McDonnold
- Rob Orr (Texas politician)
- James D. Porter
- Jeri Ryan (actress)
- Beverly St. John
- John Stiles
- John Templeton (1912–2008), American businessman, investor, and philanthropist
- Martha Goodwin Tunstall (1838-1911), suffragist and abolitionist
- Louisa Woosley (first ordained woman in Presbyterianism)
- Carver Yu Tat-sum (Former president of China Graduate School of Theology)

== Bibliography ==
- Thomas Hardesty Campbell, Milton L. Baughn, and Ben M. Barrus. A People Called Cumberland Presbyterian (Memphis: Tennessee, 1972).
- Matthew H. Gore. The History of the Cumberland Presbyterian Church in Kentucky to 1988. Published by the Joint Heritage Committee of Covenant and Cumberland Presbyteries (Memphis: Tennessee, 2000).
- Campbell, Ben (2005). The Cumberland Presbyterian Church In Encyclopedia of Religion in the South, edited by Samuel S. Hill. Mercer University Press. p. 854. ISBN 978-0865547582.
- 2006 Minutes of the General Assembly of the Cumberland Presbyterian Church (Memphis: Tennessee, 2007).
- 2007 Minutes of the General Assembly of the Cumberland Presbyterian Church (Memphis: Tennessee, 2008).
- 2013 Yearbook of the General Assembly of the Cumberland Presbyterian Church (Memphis: Tennessee, 2013).
- 2026 Minutes of the Called Meeting of the General Assembly of the Cumberland Presbyterian Church (Memphis: Tennessee, 2026).
- 2026 Yearbook of the General Assembly of the Cumberland Presbyterian Church (Memphis: Tennessee, 2026).
