= Thomas Nolan Campbell =

American anthropologist

Thomas Nolan Campbell (July 3, 1908 – October 15, 2003) was an American archaeologist and ethnohistorian and U.S. Army Air Corps veteran of World War II, most renowned for his scholarship about the native peoples of south Texas and northern Mexico. He was a charter member of the Society for American Archaeology (1939), an honorary life member of the Texas Academy of Science (1957), a fellow (1962) and President (1964) of the Texas Archeological Society, and was named Archeologist of the Year by the Texas Historical Commission in 1998.

== Life and fieldwork ==
He was born in Munday (Knox County), Texas to Minnie Bell Nelson and Finis Oscoe (F.O.) Campbell, both then in their 20s; the family also lived in nearby, small Paducah, Texas. He was the eldest of three siblings including Mary Margaret (1913-1981) and Geraldine (1919-2011). Thomas graduated high school valedictorian in 1925, then attended McMurry College (1925-27) and the University of Texas at Austin where he received his B.A. in 1930. Needing to earn money during the Great Depression, he returned to his hometown area where he taught high school classes for four years in Snyder and Albany, Texas. He went back to U.T. in 1934 and received his first M.A. in 1936 with his anthropology thesis, "A Study of Ornamentation in The Pottery of Prehistoric East Texas, with Special Attention Given to Designs". He became an instructor at that university from 1938-1941. He then received two graduate degrees from Harvard University; first, an M.A. in 1940. In June 1940 Thomas married Lorene Merle (Gregg) (from Austin, 1911 - 1994) in San Antonio, Texas, and they had a daughter, Tommy Jo (T.J.): as a father-daughter team they would later publish books and became "renowned in the field of Texas Native American Ethnohistory". Between 1941 and 1946 he was an assistant professor on leave for military service at U.T. His Ph.D. in anthropology and archaeology from Harvard (1947) was interrupted by his Air Corps service during World War II. Lt. (later, Capt.) Campbell served in various capacities at the Army Air Force Pilot Ground School at Ellington Field (Houston) and at the AAF Training Command at Randolph Field, San Antonio.

Other than work at Awatovi Pueblo in Arizona (1937) and brief periods in northeast Mexico (1947) and western Oklahoma (1975), Dr. Campbell's field archeological experiences were in Texas. As a graduate student in the early to mid-1930s he worked for anthropologist J.E. Pearce at a number of sites in central Texas, then with Walter Goldschmidt in east Texas (most notably at the Keith Mound), and in 1938-39 with J. Charles Kelley and Donald Lehmer on a Harvard-funded milestone study of the archaeology of the Big Bend. After returning to U.T. as faculty in 1947, he led several field schools at the Mustang Lake shell midden in Calhoun County, a huge burned rock midden (the McClure Mound) in Williamson County, and the Kincaid Shelter in Uvalde County. His final fieldwork projects were carried out for the National Park Service, first (1963) of Padre Island National Seashore, then (1966-67) of the Big Bend National Park. Still, he regarded himself as less a field archaeologist and more a researcher at home in the archives. Taking note of a great deal of unpublished fieldwork done by the WPA in the 1930s in Texas including on the coast, Dr. Campbell set out to organize the data from those sites and prepare them for publication. He scrutinized 17th- and 18th-century Spanish documentary primary sources -- explorers’ accounts, mission inventories, and baptismal records -- in pursuit of details on the lifeways, material culture, and locations of hundreds of Indian groups in that manner, contributing 558 entries to the Handbook of Texas and the New Handbook of Texas. Volumes co-authored with his daughter T.J. Campbell include meticulous accounts of the route beginning in 1528 of Alvar Nunez Cabeza de Vaca, the Spanish missions of San Antonio, and later, the Guerrero missions in Coahuila. His editorial and typing skill including proficiency in shorthand was recognized in appointments as editor of American Antiquity (July 1962-April 1966), Bulletin of the Texas Archeological Society (1958-1961 - and two issues of that journal were subsequently dedicated to him, in 1985 and 2005) and the Texas Journal of Science (1953-56).

== Scholarship ==
His full-time teaching career began in 1947 as an associate professor of anthropology at The University of Texas at Austin. Among the courses he taught were Texas Indians, North American Archeology, Primitive Arts and Crafts, Advanced Physical Anthropology, a summer field school (at the Kincaid site), and two graduate seminars in archeology. Known to his friends and colleagues as Tom, he was a precise scholar with a prodigious memory and a love of puns. He served as chairman (1947 to 1962) of the U.T. anthropology department and its director of research (1947-1966), was promoted to professor in 1952, and retired as professor emeritus in 1978, though he continued working in his office until the mid-1990s when he donated his papers to the university. His last student was Mariah Wade (PhD 1998, U.T.), a scholar of the Edwards Plateau Indians and their interactions with the Spanish and other native groups. Dr. Campbell served as an editorial councilmember of the American Anthropological Association (1962-66) and as secretary of the Anthropology Section of the American Association for the Advancement of Science (1941), among other achievements.

Topics of his articles include petroglyphs as a measure of slope stability (with Ben Howard and others, published in Science, 1941), the pioneer tree-ring work of Jacob Kuechler (Tree-Ring Bulletin, 1949), the use of medicinal plants by the Choctaw, Chickasaw and Creek Indians (Journal of the Washington Academy of Sciences, 1951), and the Choctaw afterworld (Journal of American Folklore, 1959). He studied Native American cultures throughout his career, establishing (with William Newcomb) that the Tonkawa were not native to Texas, and (with LeRoy Johnson) he recognized a previously undetected Native American language (Sanan).

== Death ==
In addition to his sister Geraldine Hauser, he was survived by his daughter T.J. Campbell and his cat Lorelei, and by three nephews Richard, Don, and James Hauser.
