= Samuel King (minister) =

American minister (1775–1842)

Reverend Samuel King (April 29, 1775 – September 13, 1842), was a Presbyterian minister and one of the founders of the Cumberland Presbyterian Church.

King was born in North Carolina (in either Iredell County or Rowan County) of Scots-Irish parents Robert King (15 January 1736 – 6 January 1806) and Mary Morrison (1758 – 1817). He was the 5th of 12 children. He married Anna Dixon (December 23, 1778 – 3 December 18??) on the August 25, 1795 in Sumner County, Tennessee. He founded the Cumberland Presbyterian Church in 1810 in Tennessee along with Samuel McAdoo and Finnis Ewing.
