= Cumberland College (Princeton, Kentucky) =

Presbyterian college in Princeton, Kentucky, US

Coordinates: 37°07.047′N 87°53.861′W

Cumberland College in Princeton, Kentucky, was founded in 1826 and operated until 1861. It was the first college affiliated with the Cumberland Presbyterian Church. In 1842, the Cumberland Presbyterian denomination withdrew its support from Cumberland College in favor of Cumberland University in Lebanon, Tennessee. In doing so, the denomination intended to simply relocate the school from Princeton to Lebanon, but Cumberland College remained open without denominational support until the Civil War.

== Founding and early years ==
On October 22, 1825, Cumberland Synod, the ruling judicatory of the Cumberland Presbyterian Church, resolved to establish a college somewhere in southwestern Kentucky. The school's primary purpose was to educate young men who wanted to become ministers, but the school would be open to all. The school would also require students to perform manual labor for two to three hours a day. The synod appointed a commission to determine a site for the college. The commission considered four towns in Kentucky (Hopkinsville, Russellville, Elkton, and Princeton) and finally chose Princeton on January 13, 1826. The commission hired Franceway R. Cossitt, a Cumberland Presbyterian minister, as the college's president and sole teacher. Classes first began on March 1, 1826. By the end of the year, the college had about sixty students and had hired another teacher. Originally the college was named, as the synod had resolved, the Cumberland Presbyterian College. However, when the synod requested a charter for the college, members of the Kentucky legislature worried that the original name would stoke sectarian conflict. The legislature therefore dropped "Presbyterian" from the name and issued a charter to Cumberland College on January 8, 1827.

Cumberland College was part of a larger manual labor movement, as other schools like the Oneida Institute and Oberlin College required students to perform physical labor in addition to their study. The synod hoped that manual labor would prevent students from sacrificing "bodily vigor" at the expense of "mental energy." The college had a working farm, and students worked on the farm two hours a day.

In 1830 the college became home to the first Cumberland Presbyterian newspaper, the Religious and Literary Intelligencer. The paper's editor moved to Nashville in 1832 and changed the paper's name to the Revivalist; two years later, it was renamed the Cumberland Presbyterian, and eventually became the denominational organ.

== Relocation and final years ==
The college's largest problem was its indebtedness. The synodical commission had chosen Princeton as the college's site on the strength of local pledges of support amounting to at least $15,000, but few of the pledges were upheld. By 1837 the college was $12,000 in debt, and five years later it was still indebted more than $5,600.

In May 1842, the General Assembly of the Cumberland Presbyterian Church (now the denomination's highest judicatory) responded to the college's indebtedness by appointing a commission to decide whether to relocate the college, and if so where. The commission met in July and decided to relocate the college to Lebanon, Tennessee, whose backers offered $10,000 in cash. Neither the commission nor the General Assembly had the authority to dissolve Cumberland College or to relocate it outside Kentucky. The General Assembly did, however, cease its financial support for the Princeton college and allocated educational funds to the Lebanon college. Also, Franceway Cossitt left the Princeton college to become the Lebanon college's first president. The Lebanon school opened in October 1842. Though it was originally named Cumberland College, it was chartered as Cumberland University on December 30, 1843.

The college in Princeton, Kentucky, remained open. The college ceased its manual labor operations and sold off its farm and farm equipment. By the end of 1842, the college was, for the first time in its history, debt-free. In October 1844, Green River Synod (an intermediate judicatory of the denomination) agreed to sponsor the college now that the General Assembly no longer sponsored it.

Cumberland College remained viable until the height of the secession crisis. The college's last class graduated in the fall of 1860, and the college's board of trustees sold off the property. By 1888, wrote a Cumberland Presbyterian historian, "every vestige even of the old buildings" had "disappeared."

== Cemetery and historic marker ==
The college's cemetery can be found on a private, residential yard on Traylor Street near Calvary Baptist Church.

A Kentucky historic marker (number 1453), erected in 1972, stands near the junction of US 62 and KY 91.

== Presidents ==
- Franceway R. Cossitt (1826–1842)
- Francis C. Usher, de facto (1842–1843)
- Richard Beard (1843–1854)
- Alexander J. Baird (1854–1855)
- Azel Freeman, pro tem (1855)
- Milton Bird (1855–1858)
- Hamilton W. Pierson (1858–1860)

== Notable alumni ==
- James L. Alcorn, governor of Mississippi and U.S. senator
- Richard Beard, Cumberland Presbyterian minister and theologian
- A. B. George, Louisiana state senator and mayor of Minden, Louisiana
- Willis B. Machen, Confederate congressman and U.S. senator
- Benjamin W. McDonnold, Cumberland Presbyterian minister and historian
- John Selden Roane, governor of Arkansas and Confederate brigadier general
- J. D. Watkins, Louisiana state senator
- Harvey Magee Watterson, U.S. representative from Tennessee and father of Henry Watterson

== See also ==
- Category:Cumberland College (Princeton, Kentucky) alumni

== Sources ==
- Appletons' Cyclopaedia of American Biography. Ed. James Grant Wilson and John Fiske. 6 vols.; New York: D. Appleton, 1887–89. Vol. 5; Vol. 6
- "Cumberland Presbyterian College." http://www.waymarking.com/waymarks/WMDZ7X_Cumberland_Presbyterian_College Accessed October 15, 2014.
- Goodman, Paul. "The Manual Labor Movement and the Origins of Abolitionism." Journal of the Early Republic 13, no. 3 (Autumn 1993), pp. 355–388. JSTOR
- Gore, Matthew H. A History of the Cumberland Presbyterian Church in Kentucky to 1988. Memphis: Joint Heritage Committee of Covenant and Cumberland Presbyteries, 2000. ASIN B0006RH4GA
- Gore, Matthew H. A Brief History of Cumberland College 1825-1861. Ellendale, Tenn.: Boardman Books, 2010. ISBN 9780557628377
- Kentucky Historical Society Historic Marker Database. Accessed October 15, 2014.
- McDonnold, B. W. History of the Cumberland Presbyterian Church. Nashville: Board of Publication of Cumberland Presbyterian Church, 1888. Google Books
