= Floating capital =

Floating capital denotes currency in circulation and assets which can be used for many purposes. It is therefore opposed to "sunk capital", which can be used only for one purpose (for example, a mineshaft).

It comprises the materials and components, constantly supplied in the effecting of all manufactures; currency used for the purpose of transactions, wages and salaries; products in transportation, or in the process of being stored in the prospect of being eventually utilized for this purpose; and the working, circulating capital; rather than that which is fixed as permanently stationary value.

== Relationship to working capital ==
In modern financial reporting, the assets historically described as floating capital overlap with current assets and working capital. Working capital is commonly calculated as current assets minus current liabilities, and is used as a measure of the resources available to meet short-term obligations. Current assets generally include assets expected to be realised, sold or consumed in the normal operating cycle, assets held primarily for trading, assets expected to be realised within twelve months, and unrestricted cash or cash equivalents.
