= Samuel McAdow =

Samuel McAdow (1760–1844), a Presbyterian minister. One of the founders of the Cumberland Presbyterian Church in 1810.

McAdow was born April 10, 1760, in North Carolina, the son of a farmer. He and his family were members of the Buffalo Presbyterian Church. His early education was temporarily interrupted by the American Revolution, but he completed his studies after the war and went on to study at Mecklenburg College. In November 1788, he married Henrietta Wheatly and they had five children, four of whom died at a young age.

Although he was ordained, the time of his ordination is unknown. In 1800, after the death of his first wife, he turned his attention toward the West and McAdow began preaching in the area of the Red River in Logan County, Kentucky. In October of the same year, he married Catherine Clark who later bore him a daughter. During this time, he traveled and preached along the Ohio River in Kentucky. In 1806 he married for a third time, after Catherine's death.

McAdow helped to found the Cumberland Presbytery in 1810, and was active in Dickson, TN until 1815 when he sold his farm and took a church in Jackson County, TN. In 1828, he relocated a final time to Illinois. He died in 1844.
