= Cumberland Presbyterian Center =

Coordinates: 35.1875°N 89.7902°W

Cumberland Presbyterian Center is the denominational headquarters of the Cumberland Presbyterian Church, located in Memphis, Tennessee.

== Original building ==
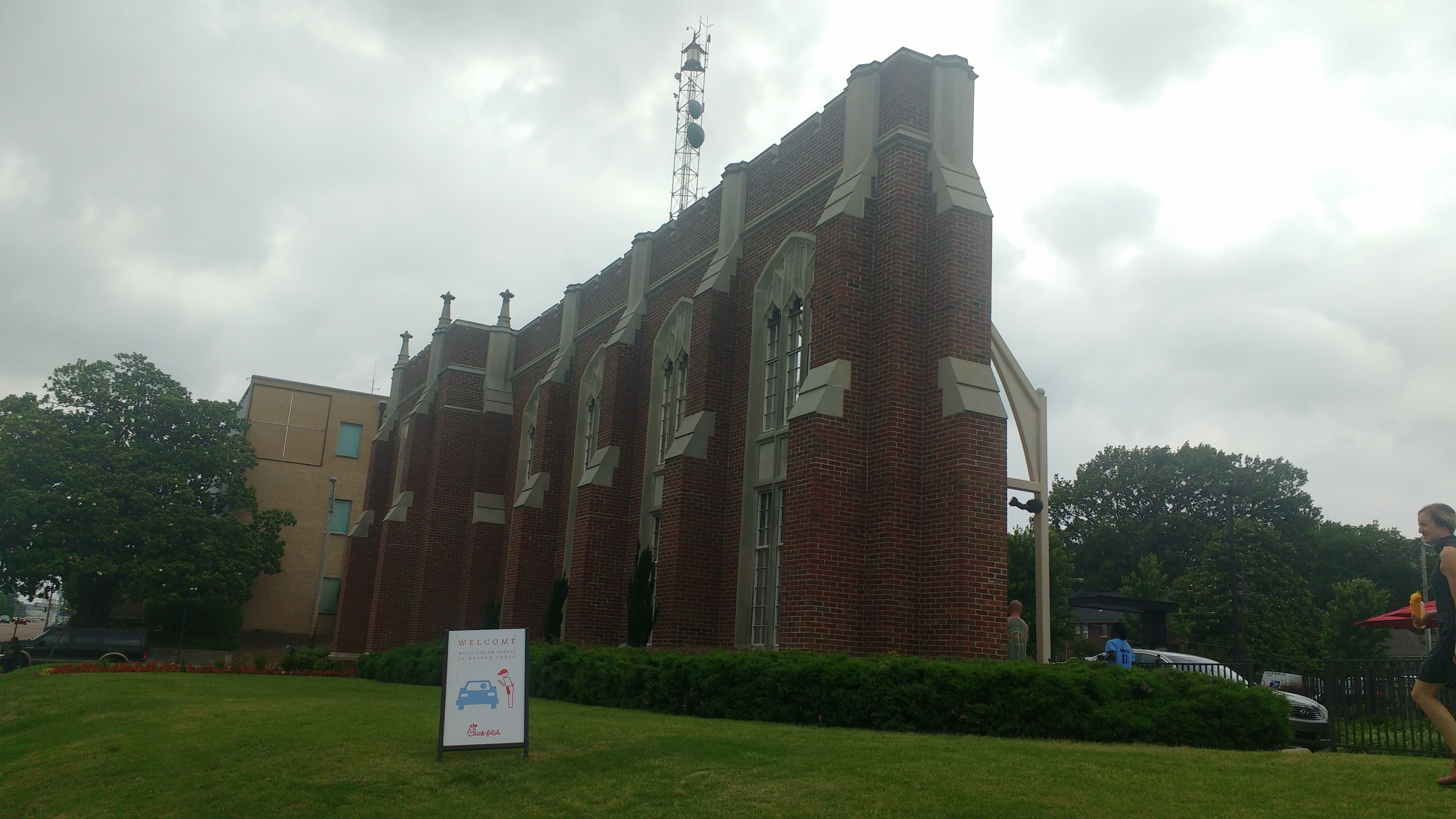
Remaining wall of gothic structure

The original center was located at 1978 Union Avenue in Memphis, Tennessee, from 1951 to 2008. Funded through a denomination wide campaign in the late-1940s, the original building was an impressive and architecturally interesting neo-Gothic structure. The Cumberland Presbyterian denomination's seminary, Memphis Theological Seminary, was located less than a mile away. The construction of the center, and the consolidation of board and agency offices in Memphis, marked the end of a long period of recovery for the Cumberland Presbyterian denomination after a contentious period of a partial union with the Presbyterian Church (USA) since 1906.

== A new denominational headquarters ==
At the meetings of their General Assemblies in 2005 and 2006, Cumberland Presbyterians voted to either build, purchase, or lease a new denominational headquarters. The decision was not without opposition. Factions within the denomination were divided over the deposition of the historic midtown Memphis structure that had served since 1951. Some Cumberland Presbyterians felt that the denomination would be better served by remodeling the existing structure. Arguments against renovation included the fear that asbestos employed in the original construction was a potential health risk to the occupants and that the structure was no longer in a desirable location. The majority of the denominational boards and agencies housed at the property were strongly in favor of renovation and that the Memphis firm, Chandler Demolition Company, Inc. (later hired by Chick-fil-A to demolish the building), did not consider the asbestos to be a health risk.

The General Assembly appointed a task force to raise funds for construction, and to select a site for a new denominational headquarters. At the same time, the assembly affirmed its support for a centralized denominational staff. On February 22, 2008, a site for the new Cumberland Presbyterian Center campus comprising two partially constructed buildings, a grassy area, and a portion of Rock Creek, was purchased near the intersection of Interstate 40 and Germantown Road in Memphis. Denominational offices were able to move to the new site, at 8207 Traditional Place, in September 2008.

== Demolition of the historic building ==
Chick-fil-A purchased the original property with the intention of developing a restaurant on the site. However, a general outcry from local media, neighborhood residents, and Memphis area historic preservationists persuaded the restaurant chain to agree to preserve at least a portion of the historic building. By mid-May 2009, the structure had been demolished, with the exception of the south wall along Union Avenue and a portion of the west wall along Rembert Street.

== Boards, Agencies, and Departments housed at the Cumberland Presbyterian Center ==
- Discipleship Ministry Team
- Missions Ministry Team
- Board of Stewardship
- Pastoral Development Ministry Team
- Ministry Council
- Historical Foundation of the Cumberland Presbyterian Church and the Cumberland Presbyterian Church in America (denominational library and archives)
- Office of the General Assembly
