= Ride for Reading =

U.S. nonprofit organization

Ride for Reading (established in 2008) is a 501(c)(3) non-profit organization located in Nashville, Tennessee, that donates books to children from low-income areas and hosts fund-raising events to promote literacy, as well as educating children about bicycling. Since 2008, Ride for Reading has distributed over 300,000 books to children in middle Tennessee and across the United States. Along with donating books, Ride for Reading has established its own cycling team, named "Team RfR".

The organization hosts a national push in conjunction with National Bike month called Ride for Reading Week. During this week in May, cities around the country host their own RfR book delivery via bicycle. In 2012 there were 11 participating cities and an amazing 20 cities in 2013.
