= Abingdon Presbytery =

Abingdon Presbytery is a part of the Presbyterian Church (U.S.A.) and within the Synod of Mid-Atlantic. It consists of 48 congregations with a total of 2,475 members. The average number of members is 52, and the median is 27 (2022). The presbytery is named after a region in southwestern Virginia that includes 13 counties and the city of Abingdon, VA.
