= Matthew H. Gore =

American historian

- Born: 1962 (age 63–64); United States
- Occupations: Historian, popular culturist, educator, author, editor
- Notable work: The History of the Cumberland Presbyterian Church in Kentucky to 1988

Matthew H. Gore (born 1962) is a British historian, popular culturist, author, editor and educator.

He is perhaps best known for his book The History of the Cumberland Presbyterian Church in Kentucky to 1988 (2000), but has published on a variety of topics as diverse as The Origin of Marvelman (a British superhero of the 1950s and 1960s), the relative scarcity of East German philatelics, and the biography of British pulp artist, Denis McLoughlin. He is employed by the Board of Christian Education of the Cumberland Presbyterian Church at the Cumberland Presbyterian Center in Memphis, Tennessee, and has been associated with both Western Kentucky University, which honored him with their James H. Poteet Award, and the University of Kentucky. He also serves as editor for the Boardman Books (Memphis, Tennessee) series Comics Monographs.

== Life and works ==
In the 1970s, Gore published a number of comic book and science fiction related fanzines. These included GAW (with Wally Wingert), IT, Inter-com, and Chaz Furnd, Bas Crod. IT had several incarnations including one which indexed Jack Kirby's Fourth World. Chaz Furnd, Bas Crod, devoted to the EC Comics of the 1950s ran from 1974 to 1977 and is probably the best known.

In the early days of the Internet, Gore founded and moderated a number of discussion groups devoted to historic and popular culture topics. Many of these, including lists devoted to comic artist Jack Kirby and character Captain Marvel (shazam-l), still exist in various formats, although he is no longer moderator. He has also served several terms on the board of directors of the Grand Comics Database (GCD), a volunteer organization devoted to indexing all world comic books.

Matthew Gore is married to Susan K. Gore, the Director of the Historical Foundation of the Cumberland Presbyterian Church and the Cumberland Presbyterian Church in America.
