= Kentucky Synod =

Synod of the defunct Presbyterian Church in the United States of America

Kentucky Synod was a synod of the Presbyterian Church in the United States of America established in the late 18th century.

As a body, Kentucky Synod was a great deal more conservative than the Presbyterian Church as a whole — especially in its opposition to many aspects of the Second Great Awakening, a revival movement that thrived in Kentucky from about 1798 to about 1820. Synod suspended or deposed a number of revivalist Presbyterian ministers, but these men continued to preach to their former congregations. Eventually, Barton W. Stone, who abandoned Washington Presbytery in 1803, formed Springfield Presbytery, which eventually became the Christian Church (Disciples of Christ). In 1810, ministers from the former Cumberland Presbytery, which had been dissolved by Synod five years earlier, left the church and created an independent presbytery which became the Cumberland Presbyterian Church.

Following the American Civil War, Kentucky Synod divided along primarily political lines. Dr. Robert J. Breckinridge led the "Northern" or Presbyterian Church (USA) faction, but the majority of members and congregations became part of the new "Southern" Presbyterian Church.

During the American Civil War, the majority of Kentucky Presbyterians supported the Confederate States of America. The division forced by the war became permanent shortly after its conclusion. Stuart Robinson and Bennett Young led the new "Southern" synod. The two denominations battled in the courts over control of property and institutions.

== Sources ==
- History of the Cumberland Presbyterian Church in Kentucky to 1988, by Matthew H. Gore, Joint Heritage Committee of Covenant and Cumberland Presbyteries. Memphis, Tennessee, 2000.
- 2006 Minutes of the General Assembly of the Cumberland Presbyterian Church (Memphis: Tennessee, 2006).
