= Memphis Theological Seminary =

Cumberland Presbyterian seminary in Memphis, Tennessee

Coordinates: 35.132917°N 89.982855°W

- Former name: Cumberland Presbyterian Theological Seminary
- Type: Private Seminary
- Active: 1852–2026
- Accreditation: Association of Theological Schools in the United States and Canada
- Religious affiliation: Cumberland Presbyterian Church
- Location: Memphis, Tennessee
- Website: http://www.memphisseminary.edu/

Memphis Theological Seminary was an ecumenical seminary of the Cumberland Presbyterian Church in Memphis, Tennessee, United States. Although it was affiliated with the Cumberland Presbyterian Church, it accepted and trained ministerial candidates from other denominations as well. It offered the Master of Divinity (MDiv), Master of Arts in Christian Ministry (MACM), and Doctor of Ministry (DMin). It also administered the Cumberland Presbyterian denomination's Program of Alternate Studies. At a called meeting of the General Assembly of the Cumberland Presbyterian Church, the closure of Memphis Theological Seminary effective July 31, 2026, was approved and a Board of Theological Education established to continue some of the seminary's functions including administration of the Program of Alternate Studies.

== History ==
MTS was a continuation of the Cumberland Presbyterian Theological School, which was originally started in McLemoresville, Tennessee in 1852. It was moved from the campus of Bethel College in McKenzie, Tennessee, to Memphis in 1964.

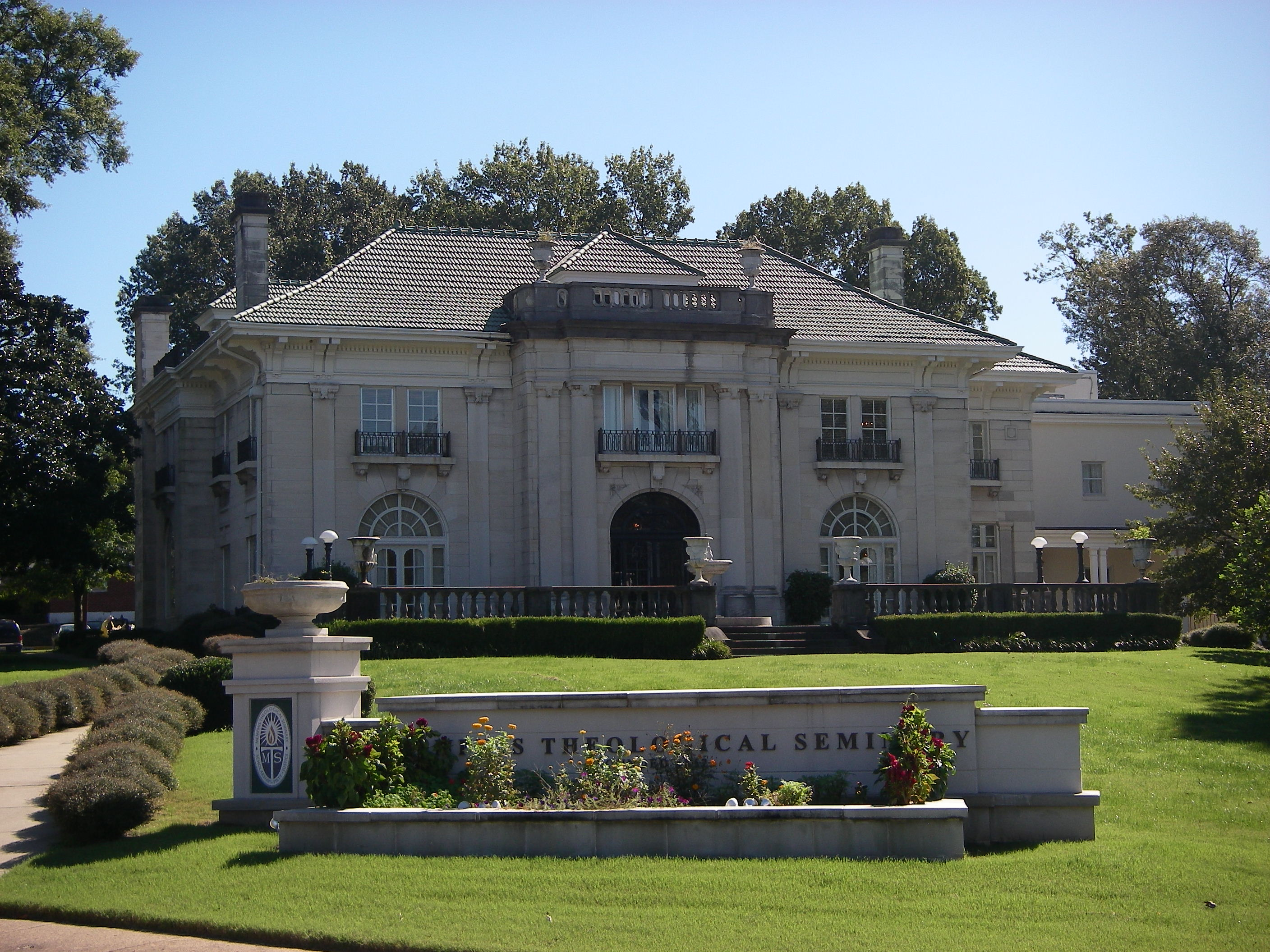
Memphis Theological Seminary

The school was moved into the Newburger House, which was constructed in 1912 for Judge Joseph Newburger. The residence was designed by the prominent Memphis architectural firm of Hanker and Cairns.

On December 16, 2025, leaders of the seminary voted to conclude academic operations on July 31, 2026, pending approval of the General Assembly of the Cumberland Presbyterian Church.

== Organization ==
The seminary was accredited by the Association of Theological Schools in the United States and Canada (ATS) and the Commission on Colleges and Schools of the Southern Association of Colleges and Schools (SACS). The seminary was also approved by the University Senate of the United Methodist Church to educate United Methodist theological students.

The seminary was located in Midtown Memphis at the corner of Union Avenue and East Parkway, across town from the denominational Cumberland Presbyterian Center in Cordova, Tennessee.

== Notable alumni ==
- E. A. Carmean

== Bibliography ==
- 2026 Minutes of the Called Meeting of the General Assembly of the Cumberland Presbyterian Church (Memphis: Tennessee, 2026).
- 2026 Yearbook of the General Assembly of the Cumberland Presbyterian Church (Memphis: Tennessee, 2026).
