= Christians (Stone Movement) =

Group in the American restoration movement

The Christians (Stone Movement) were a group arising during the Second Great Awakening of the early 19th century. The most prominent leader was Barton W. Stone. The group was committed to restoring primitive Christianity. It merged with the Disciples of Christ (Campbell Movement) in 1832 to form what is now described as the American Restoration Movement (also known as the Stone–Campbell Restoration Movement.)

The tradition today is represented in the Churches of Christ and the Christian Church (Disciples of Christ).

== Barton Stone ==
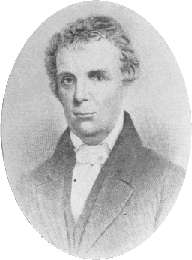
Barton W. Stone

Barton W. Stone was born to John and Mary Stone in 1772 in Port Tobacco, Maryland. During his childhood, the boy grew up within the Church of England, then had Baptist, Methodist and Episcopal church influences as well. Preachers representing Baptists and Methodists came to the area during the Second Great Awakening, and Baptist and Methodist chapels were founded in the county.

Barton entered the Guilford Academy in North Carolina in 1790. While there, Stone heard James McGready (a Presbyterian minister) speak. A few years later, he became a Presbyterian minister. But, as Stone looked more deeply into the beliefs of the Presbyterians, especially the Westminster Confession of Faith, he doubted that some of the church beliefs were truly Bible-based. He was unable to accept the Calvinistic doctrines of total depravity, unconditional election and predestination. He also believed that "Calvinism's alleged theological sophistication had . . . been bought at the price of fomenting division" and "blamed it . . . for producing ten different sects within the Presbyterian tradition alone."

== Cane Ridge revival ==
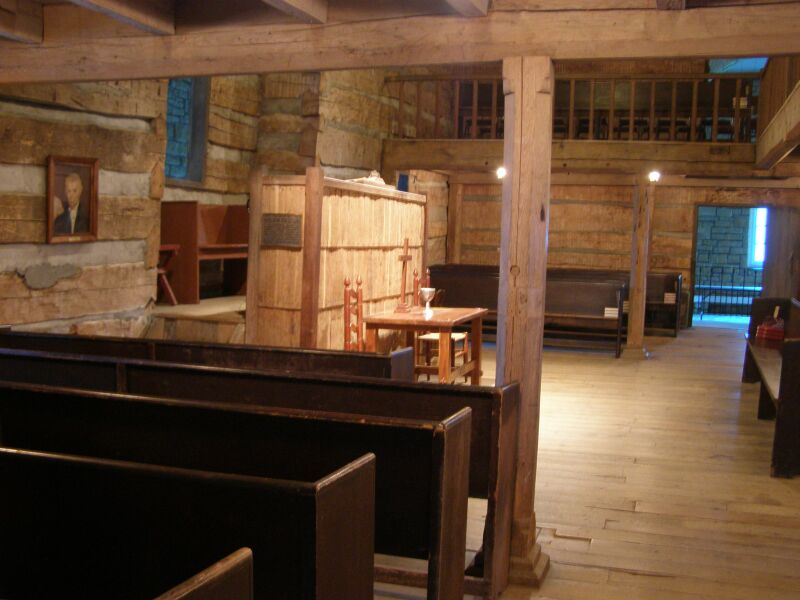
Interior of the original meeting house at Cane Ridge, Kentucky

In 1801, the Cane Ridge Revival in Kentucky planted the seed for a movement in Kentucky and the Ohio River valley to disassociate from denominationalism. In 1803 Stone and others withdrew from the Kentucky Presbytery and formed the Springfield Presbytery. The defining event of the Stone wing of the movement was the publication of Last Will and Testament of The Springfield Presbytery, at Cane Ridge, Kentucky, in 1804. The Last Will is a brief document in which Stone and five others announced their withdrawal from Presbyterianism and their intention to be solely part of the body of Christ. The writers appealed for the unity of all who follow Jesus, suggested the value of congregational self-governance, and lifted the Bible as the source for understanding the will of God. They denounced the divisive use of the Westminster Confession of Faith, and adopted the name "Christian" to identify their group.

== Christian Connection ==
Elias Smith had heard of the Stone movement by 1804, and the O'Kelly movement by 1808. The three groups merged by 1810. At that time the combined movement had a membership of approximately 20,000. This loose fellowship of churches was called by the names "Christian Connection/Connexion" or "Christian Church."

== Characteristics of the Stone movement ==
The cornerstone for the Stone movement was Christian freedom, which led them to a rejection of all the historical creeds, traditions and theological systems that had developed over time and a focus on a primitive Christianity based on the Bible.

While restoring primitive Christianity was central to the Stone movement, they saw restoring the lifestyle of the early church as essential, and during the early years "focused more . . . on holy and righteous living than on the forms and structures of the early church. The group did also seek to restore the primitive church. However, due to concern that emphasizing particular practices could undermine Christian freedom, this effort tended to take the form of rejecting tradition rather than an explicit program of reconstructing New Testament practices. The emphasis on freedom was strong enough that the movement avoided developing any ecclesiastical traditions, resulting in a movement that was "largely without dogma, form, or structure." What held "the movement together was a commitment to primitive Christianity."

Another theme was that of hastening the millennium. Many Americans of the period believed that the millennium was near and based their hopes for the millennium on their new nation, the United States. Members of the Stone movement believed that only a unified Christianity based on the apostolic church, rather than a country or any of the existing denominations, could lead to the coming of the millennium. Stone's millennialism has been described as more "apocalyptic" than that of Alexander Campbell, in that he believed people were too flawed to usher in a millennial age through human progress. Rather, he believed that it depended on the power of God, and that while waiting for God to establish His kingdom, one should live as if the rule of God were already fully established.

For the Stone movement, this had less to do with eschatological theories and more about a countercultural commitment to live as if the kingdom of God were already established on earth. This apocalyptic perspective or world view led many in the Stone movement to adopt pacifism, avoid participating in civil government, and reject violence, militarism, greed, materialism and slavery.

== Merger with the Disciples of Christ ==
"Raccoon" John Smith

The Stone movement was characterized by radical freedom and lack of dogma, while the Campbell movement was characterized by a "systematic and rational reconstruction" of the early church. Despite their differences, the two movements agreed on several critical issues. Both saw restoring apostolic Christianity as a means of hastening the millennium. Both also saw restoring the early church as a route to Christian freedom. And, both believed that unity among Christians could be achieved by using apostolic Christianity as a model. The commitment of both movements to restoring the early church and to uniting Christians was enough to motivate a union between many in the two movements.

The Stone and Campbell movements merged in 1832. This was formalized at the High Street Meeting House in Lexington, Kentucky with a handshake between Barton W. Stone and "Raccoon" John Smith. Smith had been chosen, by those present, to speak in behalf of the followers of the Campbells. A preliminary meeting of the two groups was held in late December 1831, culminating with the merger on January 1, 1832.

Two representatives of those assembled were appointed to carry the news of the union to all the churches: John Rogers, for the Christians and "Raccoon" John Smith for the reformers. Despite some challenges, the merger succeeded. Many believed the union held great promise for the future success of the combined movement, and greeted the news enthusiastically.

With the merger, there was the challenge of what to call the new movement. Clearly, finding a Biblical, non-sectarian name was important. Stone wanted to continue to use the name "Christians." Alexander Campbell insisted upon "Disciples of Christ". As a result, both names were used. The confusion over names has been present ever since.

The Stone–Campbell tradition today is represented in the Churches of Christ and the Christian Church (Disciples of Christ).
