= Springfield Presbytery =

The Springfield Presbytery was an independent presbytery that became one of the earliest expressions of the Stone-Campbell Movement. It was composed of Presbyterian ministers who withdrew from the jurisdiction of the Kentucky Synod of the Presbyterian Church in the United States of America on September 10, 1803. It dissolved itself on June 28, 1804, with the publication of a document titled the Last Will and Testament of The Springfield Presbytery, marking the birth of the Christian Church of the West.

== History ==
The immediate cause of withdrawal by the ministers was that the Synod of Kentucky had censured the Washington Presbytery for the following:

- appointing Richard McNemar, after having previously examined his doctrine and condemning it as "dangerous to the souls of men, and hostile to the interests of all religion;"
- refusing a petition to examine the doctrine of a second minister, John Thompson; and
- refusing to reexamine the doctrine of McNemar.Both ministers had expressed views at odds with the Westminster Confession. These two ministers and three others (Robert Marshall, John Dunlavy, and Barton W. Stone) protested the proceedings of the Synod and withdrew from its jurisdiction. Their signed protest was dated September 10, 1803.

They gave the following reasons for withdrawing from the jurisdiction of the Synod:

- belief that the resolution condemning McNemar's teachings (which they all shared) gave "a distorted and false representation of Mr. McNemar's sentiments" and was "calculated to prevent the influence of truth of the most interesting nature";
- assertion of the privilege of interpreting scripture independently of the Presbyterian Confession of Faith, appealing to the section in that confession that says, "the Supreme Judge, by which all controversies of religion are to be determined, and all decrees of councils, opinions of ancient writers, doctrines of men and private spirits, are to be examined, and in whose sentence we are to rest, can be no other than the Holy Spirit speaking in the Scriptures";
- argued that some of the doctrines of grace were "in a measure darkened by some expressions in the Confession of Faith [regarding the doctrine of predestination], which are used as a means of strengthening sinners in their unbelief, and subjecting many of the pious to a spirit of bondage," and said that when they tried to address those difficulties, they were accused of departing from the faith.

Based on those reasons, the ministers said that they chose to withdraw from the jurisdiction of the Kentucky Synod rather than be prosecuted under the authority of the Confession of Faith, which they could not acknowledge. But, they said they did not desire to break from communion with the members of the Synod.

They formed the Springfield Presbytery two days later. The Springfield Presbytery was a loose association of the dissenting ministers and their congregations. The Presbytery ordained a sixth minister, David Purviance, who joined it after the West Lexington Presbytery of Kentucky had refused to ordain him.

On January 31, 1804, the several ministers published a 141-page defense of their actions, in which they opposed the use of creeds to determine who is a Christian. The defense was entitled An Apology for Renouncing the Jurisdiction of the Synod of Kentucky. To Which Is Added a Compendious View of the Gospel and a Few Remarks on the Confession of Faith. The Apology was written by Robert Marshall. It argued that the examination of McNemar in 1802 had been conducted without due process, which would have justified an appeal of the decision to the General Assembly. It went on to argue that they had no reasonable hope of redress within the Presbyterian church as long as "human opinions", rather than scripture, were the standard of orthodoxy.

Stone wrote the Compendious View of the Scripture. Systematically laying out the doctrines which the Washington Presbytery had condemned, he wrote the first theological statement of the Restoration Movement.

Thompson wrote the Remarks on the Confession, arguing that, since creeds served to divide the church, even if a perfect creed could be found, it should be rejected as the standard for Christian fellowship. The unstated implication was that unity was preferable to orthodoxy.

By 1804 the Springfield Presbytery had attracted 15 congregations in Ohio and Kentucky. The leaders of this newer presbytery became concerned by its growth, as they did not want to create a new denomination or "party". Ultimately convinced that their newer Springfield Presbytery was sectarian, the six ministers dissolved it on June 28, 1804. To publicize the dissolution, they signed a document entitled The Last Will and Testament of the Springfield Presbytery. This tract willed that "this body die, be dissolved, and sink into union with the Body of Christ at large." It expressed the desire for Christian union and identified the Bible as the only standard of Christian faith and practice.

In addition to signing the Last Will and Testament, the ministers agreed to take "no other name than "Christians," on the basis that it was "the name first given by divine authority to the disciples of Christ." Soon, they adopted the name "Christian" to identify their group. Thus, former congregations from the Springfield Presbytery eventually became known as the Christian Church. It is estimated that the Christian Church numbered about 12,000 by 1830.

== The Last Will and Testament ==
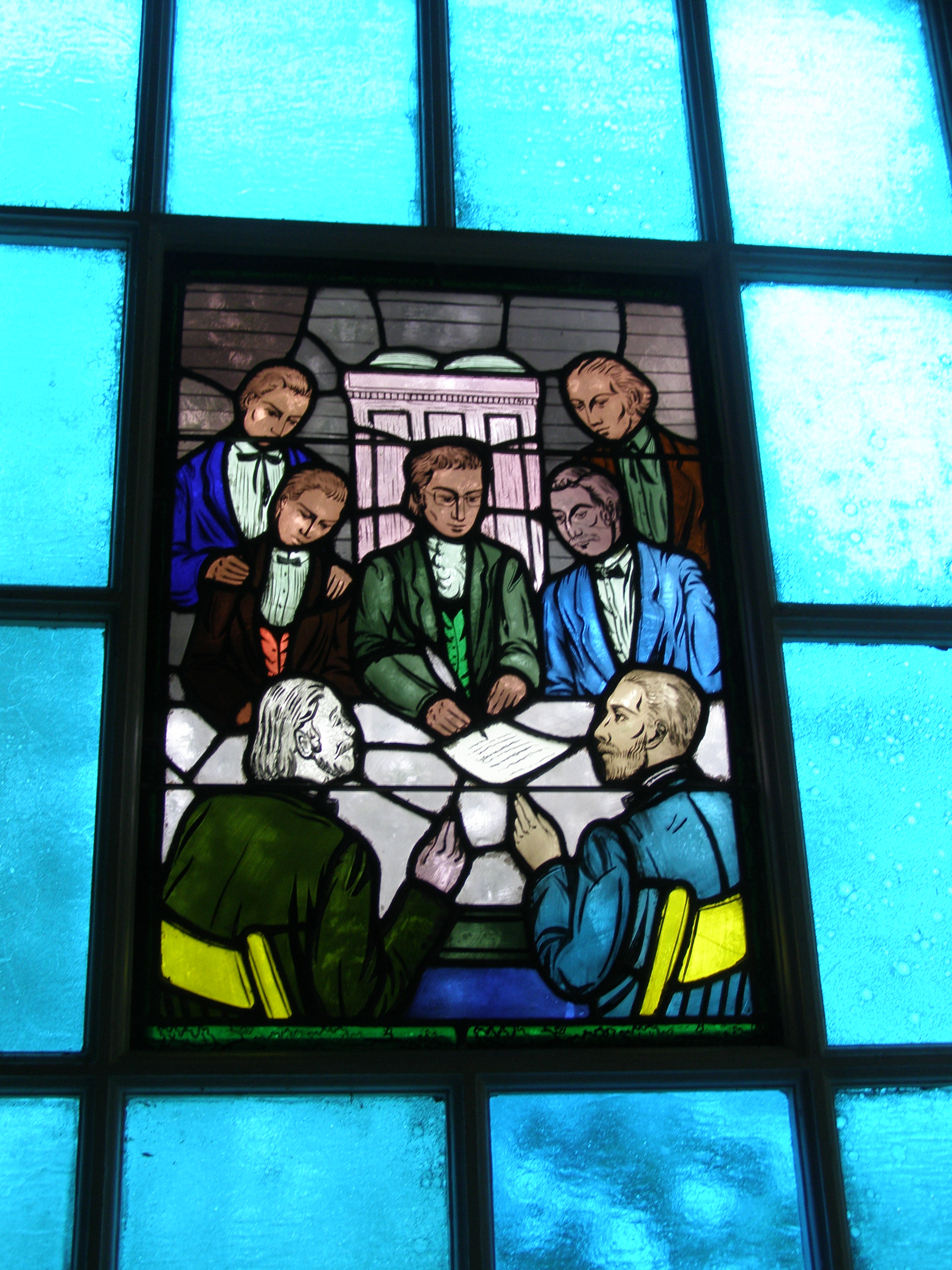
Medaillon - Signing of the Last Will and Testament of The Springfield Presbytery at Cane Ridge Meeting House, Paris, Kentucky.

The Last Will and Testament became a founding document of the Restoration Movement. The dissolution of the Springfield Presbytery was in part a symbolic act, based on the principle that gave priority to individual autonomy for local congregations. Such Congregational ideals are still fundamental to the Disciples of Christ and the Churches of Christ, due in no small part to this document. The document titled Last Will and Testament of The Springfield Presbytery was signed by Robert Marshall, John Dunlavy, and Richard McNemar on June 28, 1804, in the presence of B. W. Stone, John Thompson, and David Purviance, who served as witnesses.

== See also ==
- Barton W. Stone
