= John W. Atwater =

American politician

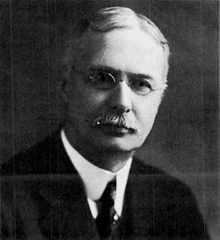
- Born: December 27, 1840 near Fearrington, North Carolina
- Died: July 4, 1910 (aged 69); Fearrington, North Carolina
- Military career
- Allegiance: Confederate States of America
- Branch: Confederate States Army
- Rank: Private
- Units: 1st North Carolina Infantry

John Wilbur Atwater (December 27, 1840 – July 4, 1910) was an American farmer and Confederate Civil War veteran who served one term as a U.S. Congressman from North Carolina between 1899 and 1901.

== Early life and education ==
Atwater was born near Fearrington, North Carolina in 1840. He attended common schools and the William Closs Academy.

== Service with the Confederacy ==
A farmer, he enlisted in the Confederate Army during the American Civil War, serving in Company D, First Regiment, of the North Carolina Volunteer Infantry. Atwater was with the army of Gen. Robert E. Lee until the Lee's surrender at Appomattox.

== Later career ==
Atwater joined the Farmers' Alliance in 1887, and was the first president of the Chatham County Alliance. He was elected to the North Carolina Senate in 1890 as an Alliance Democrat; he was subsequently elected in 1892 and 1896 as a Populist.

=== Congress ===
In 1898, as an Independent Populist, Atwater was sent to the 56th U.S. Congress, serving from March 4, 1899, to March 3, 1901.

He unsuccessfully ran for re-election in 1900 and returned to farming.

== Death and legacy ==
He died in Fearington in 1910 and is buried in the Mount Pleasant Church Cemetery near Pittsboro.

U.S. House of Representatives
Preceded by William F. Strowd	Member of the U.S. House of Representatives from North Carolina's 4th congressional district 1899–1901	Succeeded by Edward W. Pou
