= Christian Connection =

American Christian movement

- Classification: Protestant Restorationist
- Orientation: Evangelical
- Polity: Congregational
- Founder: Abner Jones, Elias Smith, James O'Kelly and Barton Stone
- Origin: 1792 as Republican Methodist Church; 1810 as Christian Connection
- Separated from: Baptists, Congregationalists, Presbyterians, and Methodists
- Separations: Christian churches and churches of Christ
- Merged into: Congregational Christian Churches
- Defunct: 1931

The Christian Connection was a Christian movement in the United States of America that developed in several places during the late 18th and early 19th centuries, composed of members who withdrew from other Christian denominations. It was influenced by settling the frontier as well as the formation of the new United States and its separation from Great Britain. The Christian Connection professed no creed, instead relying strictly on the Bible.

In practice, members coalesced around shared theological concepts such as an Arminian theological anthropology (doctrine of human nature), a rejection of the Calvinist doctrine of election, and an autonomous church government. The Connection's periodical, the Herald of Gospel Liberty (first published on September 1, 1808), was among the first religious journals published in the United States.

== Predecessor groups ==
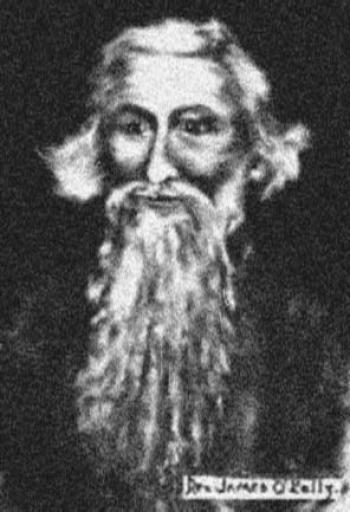
James O'Kelly

James O'Kelly was an early advocate of seeking unity through a return to New Testament Christianity. In 1792, dissatisfied with the role of bishops in the Methodist Episcopal Church, he separated from that body. O'Kelly's movement, centering in Virginia and North Carolina, was originally called the Republican Methodist Church. In 1794 they adopted the name Christian Church.

During the same period, Elias Smith of Vermont and Abner Jones of New Hampshire led a movement espousing views similar to those of O’Kelly. They believed that members could, by looking to scripture alone, simply be Christians without being bound to human traditions and the denominations that had been brought over from Europe. Working independently at first, Jones and Smith joined together in their efforts and began exclusively using the name Christian.

In 1801, the Cane Ridge Revival led by Barton W. Stone in Kentucky would plant the seed for a movement in Kentucky and the Ohio River valley to disassociate from denominationalism. Stone and five other ministers published The Last Will and Testament of the Springfield Presbytery in 1804, giving up denominational ties to the Presbyterian Church and preferring to be known simply as Christians. Stone was influenced by his earlier involvement with O'Kelly and knew of the Republican Methodist practice of simply using the name Christian.

Ideologically, the New England movement displayed an extreme form of republicanism. Convinced that the American Revolution demanded a thorough and utter break with European modes of operation, members tended to demand radical reform of politics, the legal system, medicine and religion. Elias Smith's career particularly emphasized medical and spiritual reform. All visible forms of church government were to be rejected, he argued, because they were inherently “British”. The movement's nativist approach to theology and church polity imparted a unique flavor to the movement, placing them distinctly on the fringe of early nineteenth-century North American spirituality.

== Formation ==
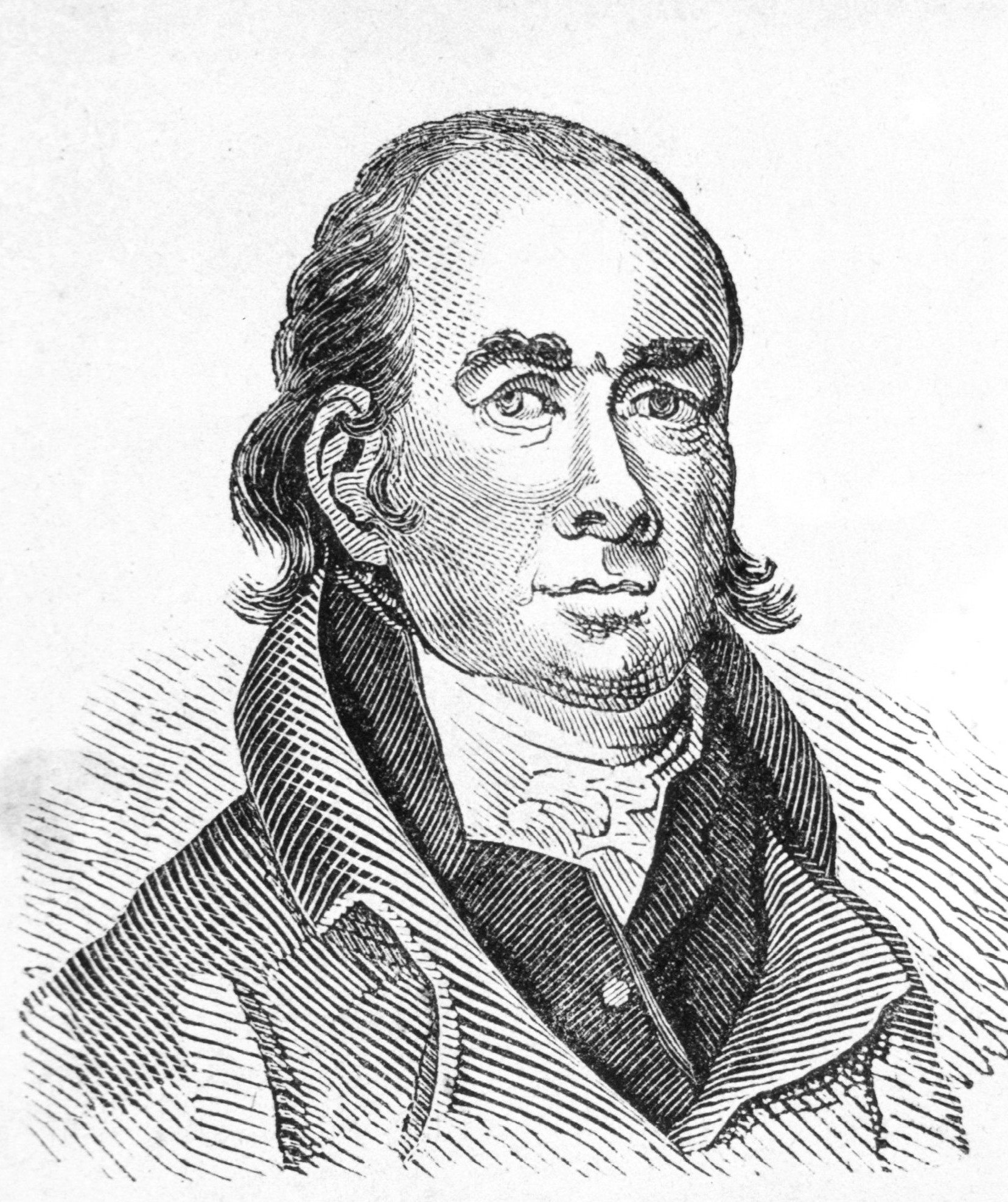
Elias Smith

Elias Smith had heard of the Stone movement by 1804, and the O'Kelly movement by 1808. Although not formally merged, the three groups were cooperating and fellowshiping by 1810. At that time the combined movement had a membership of approximately 20,000. This loose fellowship of churches was called by the names "Christian Connection/Connexion" or "Christian Church."

By 1808, O'Kelly's followers and the Smith/Jones movement were cooperating closely, and Stone's Christians in Kentucky would soon follow suit. Adherents' anti-organizational commitments prevent one from referring to “union” per se, at least before the middle of the century. Stone's concept of unity grew from a belief that Christians could extract the Bible's truths by reason, if they approached it without presuppositions. These truths, in turn, would displace human forms of order, leading to the inevitable result that Christians would start “flowing together” and others would come to faith because of the model of unity.

The Connection soon became international, with churches planted in New Brunswick, Nova Scotia, Quebec (1811) and Ontario (1821). In each case, the missions were extensions of preaching tours from neighboring American states. Thus all of the Canadian congregations were related to the New England movement. The failed Rebellions of 1837 (led principally by Louis-Joseph Papineau and William Lyon Mackenzie) severely undercut the Connection's Canadian wings. Churches survived solely in Ontario, and mostly north and east of Toronto. Conflict between the Connection and the Disciples of Christ also disrupted the former's Canadian growth.

Smith proved to be a controversial figure in the Christian Connection, leaving the denomination for several years to become a Universalist. He publicly renounced Universalism in 1823, but was not well received and reverted to it for a couple of years. Smith tried to re-enter the Connection in 1827 by repudiating Universalism. His brethren were understandably hesitant to accept him, but his home congregation of Portsmouth, New Hampshire received him back in fellowship in 1840.

== Separation of the "Christians" ==
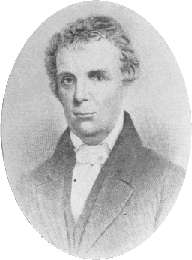
Barton W. Stone

In 1832, many of the Christian Churches in Kentucky and Tennessee led by Stone united with the churches led by Alexander Campbell. A minority continued to operate within the orbit of the Connection. Of the majority of churches that aligned with the Stone-Campbell movement, many continued to use the name Christian Church, even though they no longer considered themselves part of the Christian Connection. The confusion over names which this created continues. Much of the historiography of this period is driven by the current needs and issues of the successor denominations.

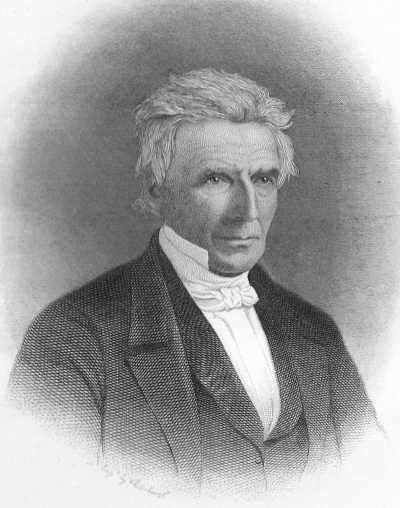
Alexander Campbell

When Stone and Alexander Campbell's Reformers (also known as Disciples and Christian Baptists) united in 1832, only a minority of Christians from the Smith/Jones and O'Kelly movements participated. Those who did were from congregations west of the Appalachian Mountains that had come into contact with the Stone movement. The eastern members had several key differences with the Stone and Campbell group: an emphasis on conversion experience, quarterly observance of communion, and nontrinitarianism.

== Organizational development ==
Through the 1830s and 1840s, practical difficulties associated with the movement's attempt at radical reform led to an erosion of the anti-organizational principles developed by Jones, Smith and others. David Millard and Joseph Badger provided leadership towards a more stable form of inter-congregational relationship. Both, at differing times, were editors of the Christian Palladium, a New York State-based religious newspaper that vied with the Herald of Gospel Liberty as the movement's leading periodical. Many of the movement's publications were produced by the Christian Publishing Association, based in Dayton, Ohio.

A disproportionate number of Christian Connection preachers in New England were involved in the eschatological stir fueled by speculations of William Miller. No fewer than seven of the 16 signatories to the 1840 call for an Adventist general conference were Connection preachers. Many members left the Connection in the mid-1840s, populating emerging denominations such as the Seventh-day Adventists and the Advent Christians.

In 1850, the General Convention of the Christian Church passed a resolution calling for the establishment of Antioch College. The college opened in 1852. Notable for its time, the Christian Connection decided that the college "shall afford equal privileges to students of both sexes." The Christian Connection sect wanted the new college to be sectarian, but the planning committee decided otherwise. Antioch College was one of the nation's first colleges to offer the same curriculum to men and women, as well as to admit blacks and operate on a non-sectarian basis.

== Mainstream and merger ==
For the second half of the nineteenth-century, leaders of the Connection pursued a policy of alignment with the mainstream. What had been birthed as a strident protest against staid religiosity was drifting back in that direction. The temperance movement, the Sunday School movement and the Bible societies all served as avenues of service through which Connection members could demonstrate to other denominations the many similarities this cluster of once fringe bodies now shared with the major religious organizations.

The Christian Church merged with the National Council of the Congregational Churches of the United States in 1931 to form the Congregational Christian Churches. In 1957 after twenty years of discussion and work, the Congregational Christian Churches and the Evangelical and Reformed Church, itself the product of the merger of two German-American denominations, forged the United Church of Christ. In 1989, the UCC and Disciples of Christ agreed to participate in full communion with each other, while remaining separate denominations.

== See also ==
- Restoration Movement
