= Senator Purviance =

Senator Purviance may refer to:

- David Purviance (1766–1847), Ohio State Senate
- Samuel D. Purviance (1774–1806), North Carolina State Senate
