= Elias Smith (disambiguation) =

Elias Smith (1769–1846) was an American journalist.

Elias Smith may also refer to:

- Elias Smith Dennis (1812–1894), American soldier and politician
- Elias Smith (Mormon) (1804–1888), American journalist
