= David Purviance =

American politician

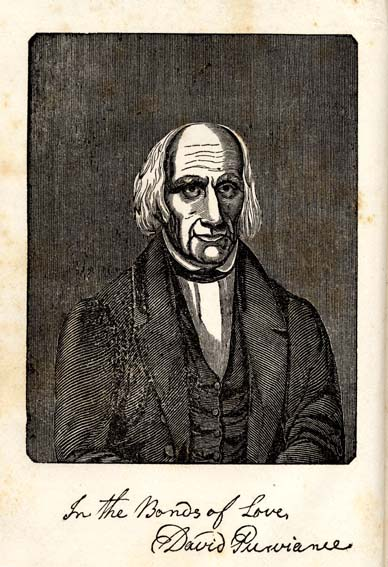
David Purviance

David Purviance (November 14, 1766 – August 19, 1847) was a member of the Kentucky legislature, a member of the Ohio legislature, and an important early leader in the Stone-Campbell Restoration Movement. He was also an early trustee (1819–1836) of Miami University in Oxford, Ohio, and often served as its president pro tempore.

== Role in the Restoration Movement ==
The religious fervor of the early 19th century U.S. western frontier found its strongest voice at Cane Ridge Meeting House in Bourbon County, Kentucky, site of a series of continual camp meetings from 1801 to 1804. In Kentucky, David Purviance, at first a farmer, engaged in significant debates with John C. Breckinridge over the proper relationship between church and state. After separating from the Presbyterian church and persuading numerous Presbyterians and Baptists to join the Christian Church movement, David Purviance moved in about 1807 from Bourbon County near Paris to "New Paris" in Preble County, Ohio, for two principal reasons: to help spread the new Christian Church movement from its Kentucky base; and because he was an abolitionist in a time when slavery sentiment predominated in Kentucky.

David Purviance was a signatory as witness to the Last Will and Testament of the Springfield Presbytery formally dissolving the presbytery, which had previously withdrawn from the Presbyterian Synod of Kentucky. The Last Will and Testament marked the birth of the Christian Church of the West and became a founding document of the Restoration Movement.

== Personal and family history ==
David Purviance was born November 14, 1766, in Rowan County, North Carolina (became Iredell County in 1788), an ending point for many colonial pioneers migrating from Pennsylvania down the Great Wagon Road of the 18th century. David Purviance's family, of Scots-Irish lineage, removed westerly from Iredell County, NC, in 1791 to Sumner County in Middle Tennessee to help found the old Shiloh Presbyterian Church outside today's Gallatin, Tennessee. In 1792, David Purviance's brother John Purviance III was scalped by hostile Native Americans in full view of the victim's wife, Martha King Purviance (later Mrs. William McCorkle). "Mattie" Purviance watched helplessly as her husband was slain and had to be forcibly restrained from running to aid the hapless John Purviance. David Purviance's family sought refuge from further Indian depredations up in Bourbon County, Kentucky, on farmland near Cane Ridge in the bluegrass near Paris, Kentucky. The "scalping" in 1792 caused the Purviance family to consider Sumner County temporarily unsafe for white pioneers, although the parents would return to Sumner County, from which Wilson County, Tennessee, would be carved in 1799. The parents were Revolutionary War "colonel" John Purviance (1743–1823)--son of another John Purviance and wife Margaret McKnight (Purviance), of county Donegal in the north of Ireland—who served in the North Carolina continental line, & wife Mary Jane Wasson (Purviance), also of Scots-Irish lineage. David Purviance's great-grandparents lived in Castlefinn, County Donegal in the north of Ireland, the family having previously been Scottish Protestant (Presbyterian which of course, like the Huguenot faith, is Calvinism) merchants and shopkeepers living and trading in Royan, Charente-Maritime, Poitou-Charentes, France for three generations, from 1598 until 1685, during which time they likely intermarried with French Calvinists (Huguenots). Following the 1685 revocation of the Edict of Nantes (Edict of Toleration) by Louis XIV, David's 2nd-great-grandfather, Jacques (Jacob) Sr, and his three sons joined with Huguenots who fled France for Britain and the American Colonies. The two younger sons went to the American Colonies, where they capitalized financially from the mistaken assumption, which they did nothing to correct, that they were Huguenots. Their father, elder brother, Jacques (Jacob) Jr, and four nephews travelled to Ulster where they settled, first in Lisburn then in Castlefinn with Scottish cousins who had settled there previously. One well-known brother of the father of David Purviance was Captain James Purviance of the North Carolina continental line. Although the son, church elder David Purviance, would aid in the formation of the new Restoration Movement and, unintentionally, development of the new Christian Church-Disciples of Christ-Church of Christ denomination, neither of his parents abjured Presbyterianism, although the father ("Colonel" John Purviance II) did join the new Cumberland Presbyterian denomination founded in 1810 in Dickson County, Middle Tennessee, but the mother (Mary Jane Wasson Purviance) died in the year 1810, and so remained a strict Presbyterian. He died August 19, 1847, and was buried in the Old North New Paris Cemetery in New Paris, Ohio.
