= John A. Mason House =

Historic house in North Carolina, United States

- U.S. National Register of Historic Places
- Location within North Carolina Location within the United States
- Location: Southwest of Durham off NC 751, near Farrington, North Carolina
- Coordinates: 35°49′31″N 78°59′38″W
- Area: 9 acres (3.6 ha)
- Built: c. 1850
- Architectural style: Greek Revival
- NRHP reference No.: 74001338
- Added to NRHP: October 23, 1974

John A. Mason House is a historic home located near Farrington, Chatham County, North Carolina. It was built about 1850, and is a two-story, Greek Revival style frame dwelling. It has a two-story rear ell and another one-story rear section. The front facade features a one-story, original, hip-roofed porch.

It was listed on the National Register of Historic Places in 1974.
