= Abner Jones =

American Christian minister (1772–1841)

Abner Jones (April 28, 1772 – May 29, 1841), also known as Elder Abner Jones, was a minister and early church reformer in the United States.

== Early life ==
According to Memoir of Elder Abner Jones, which was published in 1842 by his son, A. D. Jones, Abner Jones was born in Royalston, Massachusetts to a father native to Massachusetts and a mother native to Rhode Island. He initially trained in medicine, and settled in Lyndon, Vermont around 1797. After establishing himself in Lyndon, he married Damaris Prior.

== Ministry ==
Elder Jones had entered the ministry in 1801. He organized several Christian churches in New Hampshire and Boston, Massachusetts, prior to settling in Haverhill, Massachusetts and preaching in nearby Salem.

In 1811, he attended worship at the Christian Church in Assonet, Massachusetts. In his memoirs, it is mentioned that this church had formerly been of the Baptist denomination, but had come in recent years into the Christian Connexion. He continued to preach in New Hampshire and Milan, New York until 1833. In September, 1833, he accepted the post of minister in the Assonet church. In 1835, his wife, Damaris, died, and was buried in the churchyard. She along with several others would later be moved to the Assonet Burying Ground when the church reduced the size of its cemetery.

Elder Jones left Assonet in early 1838, moving first to Portsmouth, New Hampshire and then Upton, Massachusetts. In 1839, he married Nancy F. Clark (also Clarke) of Nantucket, and in 1840 he removed from Upton to Exeter, New Hampshire. After his death in 1841, his funeral was conducted by the Rev. Elijah Shaw of Lowell.

== Writing ==
Abner Jones wrote many hymns, and together with Elias Smith he published multiple hymnals for use in the Christian Churches. In 1807, at the request of others, he wrote his autobiography, "The Life and Experience, Travels and Preaching of Abner Jones." Almost half a century later, his son would use this book as the basis of his own book "Memoirs of Abner Jones."
