= Farrington, North Carolina =

- Unincorporated community
- Location of Farrington in North Carolina Farrington, North Carolina (the United States)
- Coordinates: 35°48′08″N 79°00′50″W
- Country: United States
- State: North Carolina
- County: Chatham
- Elevation: 233 ft (71 m)
- Time zone: UTC-5 (Eastern (EST))
  - Summer (DST): UTC-4 (EST)
- ZIP code: 27312
- Area code: 919
- GNIS feature ID: 985012

Farrington is an unincorporated community in Chatham County, North Carolina, United States. It is now part of the Fearrington Village census-designated place.

There are three sites in Farrington listed on the National Register of Historic Places: John A. Mason House, O'Kelly's Chapel, and Joseph B. Stone House.

== Geography ==
Farrington is located at 35°48′07″N 79°00′50″W (35.8018148 -79.0138990) about 8 miles (12.9 km) southeast of Chapel Hill on Farrington Point Road. It is to the north of Jordan Lake, a surrounding placemark.
