= Joseph B. Stone House =

Historic house in North Carolina, United States

- U.S. National Register of Historic Places
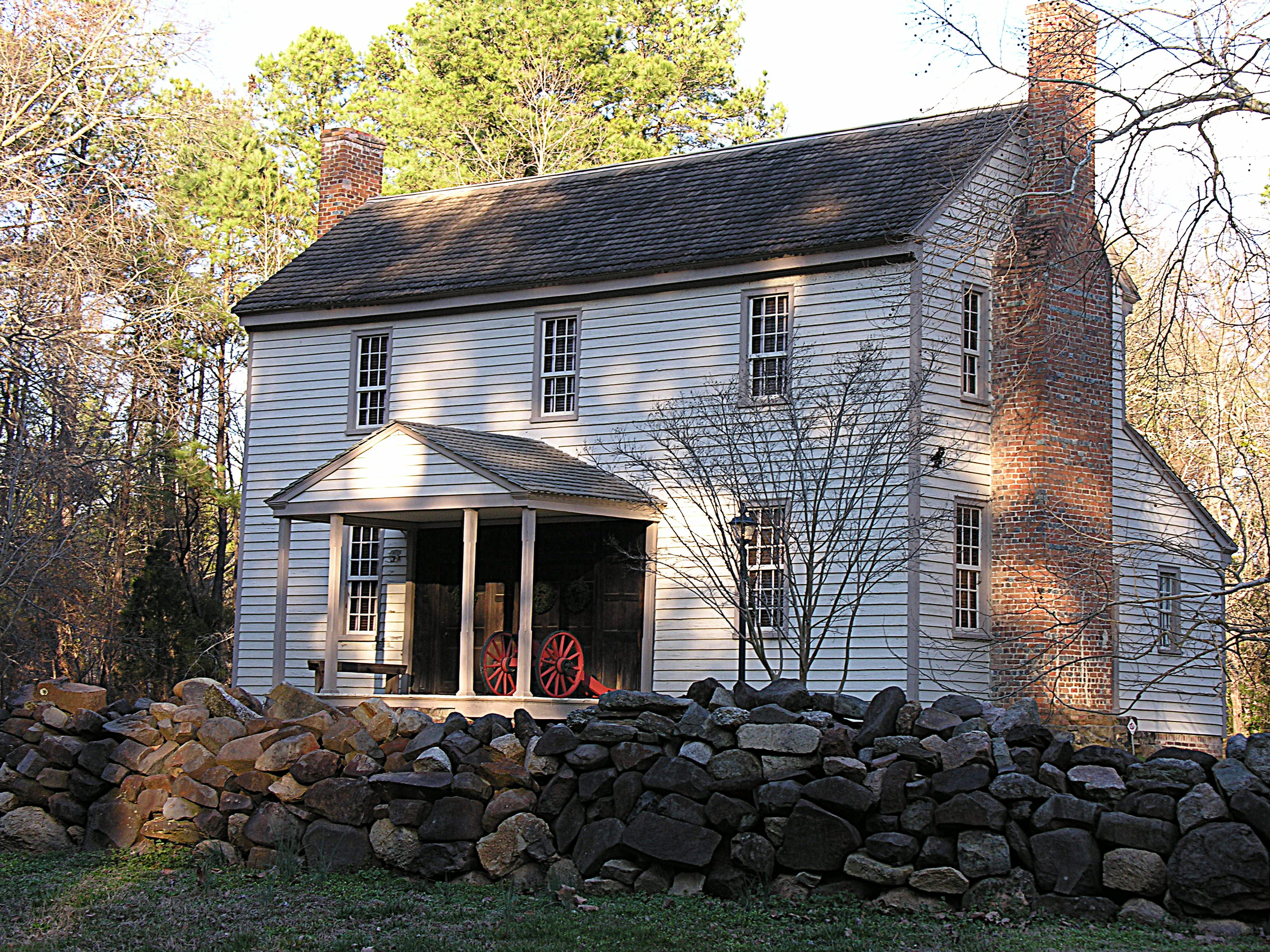

- Location within North Carolina Location within the United States
- Location: SR 1008, near Farrington, North Carolina
- Coordinates: 35°46′48″N 79°00′24″W
- Area: 3.9 acres (1.6 ha)
- Architectural style: Georgian, Federal
- NRHP reference No.: 82003440
- Added to NRHP: June 1, 1982

Joseph B. Stone House, also known as Stone-Fearrington House, is a historic home located near Farrington, Chatham County, North Carolina. It dates to the late-18th or early-19th century, and is a two-story, three bay Georgian / Federal style I house frame dwelling. It has an original one-story rear shed. The building was restored in 1969. Also on the property are the contributing old well which has been covered by a small brick gable roof pumphouse, a large early-20th century barn, and the 18th century John Dupree House, which was moved to its present site from Wake County.

It was listed on the National Register of Historic Places in 1982.
