= Edward W. Pou =

American politician (1863–1934)

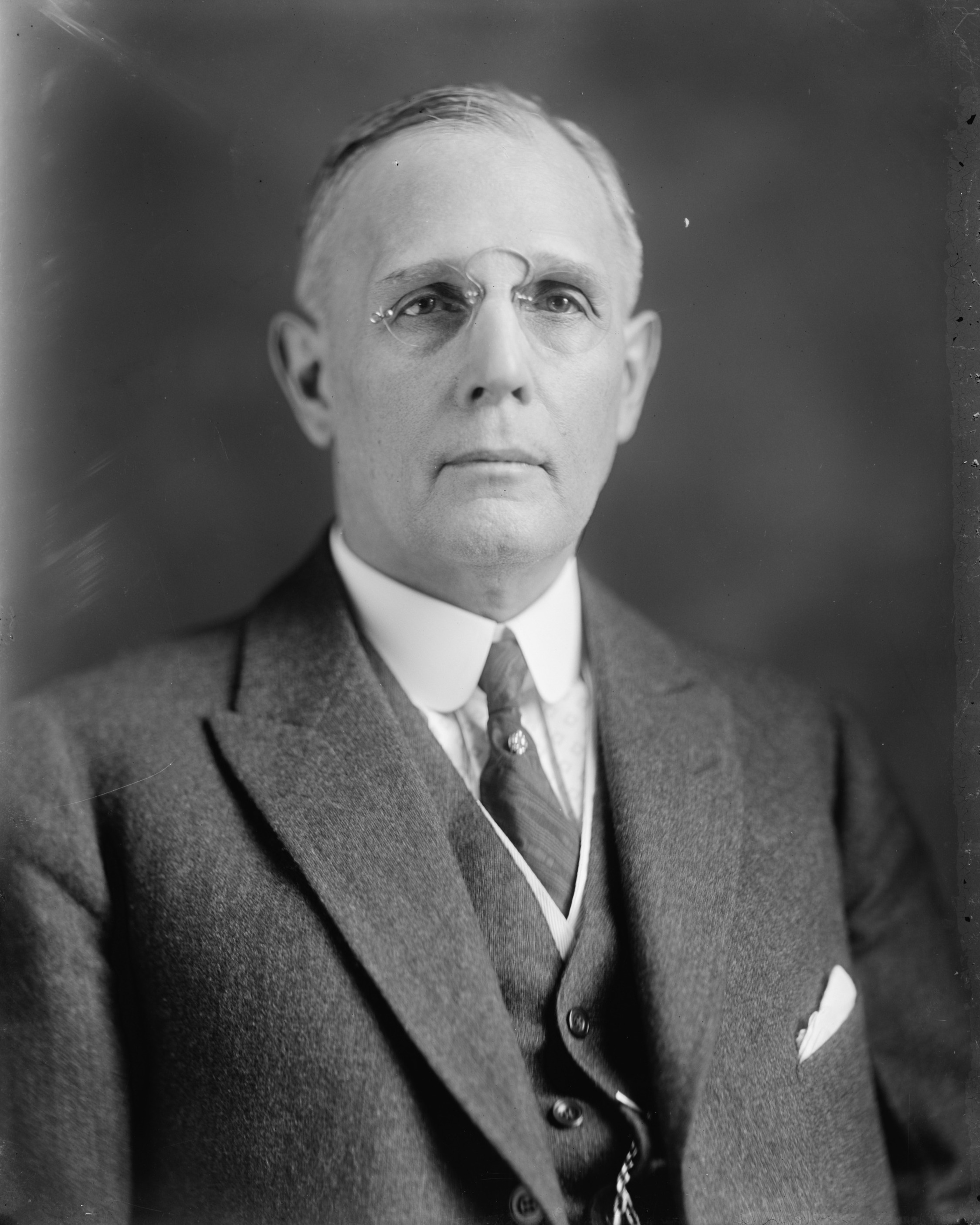
- Pou, 1905–1934

34th Dean of the United States House of Representatives
- In office March 3, 1933 – April 1, 1934
- Preceded by: Gilbert N. Haugen
- Succeeded by: Adolph J. Sabath

Chairman of the House Rules Committee
- In office March 4, 1931 – April 1, 1934
- Speaker: John Nance Garner; Henry Thomas Rainey
- Preceded by: Bertrand Snell
- Succeeded by: William B. Bankhead
- In office March 4, 1917 – March 4, 1919
- Speaker: Champ Clark
- Preceded by: Robert L. Henry
- Succeeded by: Philip P. Campbell

Member of the U.S. House of Representatives from North Carolina's 4th district
- In office March 4, 1901 – April 1, 1934
- Preceded by: John W. Atwater
- Succeeded by: Harold D. Cooley

Personal details
- Born: Edward William Pou; September 9, 1863 Tuskegee, Alabama
- Died: April 1, 1934 (aged 70) Washington, D.C.
- Party: Democratic
- Education: University of North Carolina at Chapel Hill

Edward William Pou (/ˈpjuː/; September 9, 1863 – April 1, 1934) was an American politician, serving in the United States Congress as a representative from 1901 until his death in Washington, D.C., on April 1, 1934. From March 1933 to April 1934, he was the longest-serving current member of Congress and was the dean of the United States House of Representatives.

== Biography ==
Born in Tuskegee, Alabama, on September 9, 1863, he moved to North Carolina with his parents in 1867, where he attended the University of North Carolina at Chapel Hill and studied law. His fraternity was Alpha Tau Omega. After practicing law in Smithfield, North Carolina for a number of years, he served as a Democratic U.S. Representative from North Carolina's 4th district, 1901–1934, and served as chairman of the Committee on Claims (abolished in 1946) and then of the House Rules Committee. He died in Washington, April 1, 1934, while still in office.

Pou is notable for his support of Louis F. Post, United States Secretary of Labor and head of the Bureau of Immigration, who had, in the era of the Palmer raids, reversed many of the decisions of the Attorney General and his aide J. Edgar Hoover as to deportations. On April 15, 1920, Kansas Congressman Homer Hoch accused Post of having abused his power and called for his impeachment. The House Committee on Rules planned to ask the President to remove Post instead of impeaching him, so Post requested and was granted a chance to testify. He successfully defended his actions on May 7–8, attacking Attorney General Palmer and others. In a dramatic exchange, Congressman Pou, a Democratic supporter of the anti-radical campaign, praised Post's actions, saying, "I believe you have followed your sense of duty absolutely," and walked out of the room, leaving it in stunned silence. The Rules Committee took no further action.

== Name ==
Asked how to say his name, he told The Literary Digest, "Though my name is spelled Pou, it is pronounced as though it were spelled pew or pugh." (Charles Earle Funk, What's the Name, Please?, Funk & Wagnalls, 1936.)

== See also ==
- List of members of the United States Congress who died in office (1900–1949)

== Sources ==
- United States Congress. "Edward W. Pou (id: P000474)". Biographical Directory of the United States Congress.
- New York Times: "E.W. Pou is Dead, Veteran in House," April 2, 1934, accessed January 15, 2010

U.S. House of Representatives
Preceded by John W. Atwater	Member of the U.S. House of Representatives from North Carolina's 4th congressional district 1901–1934	Succeeded by Harold D. Cooley
