= O'Kelly's Chapel =

- U.S. National Register of Historic Places
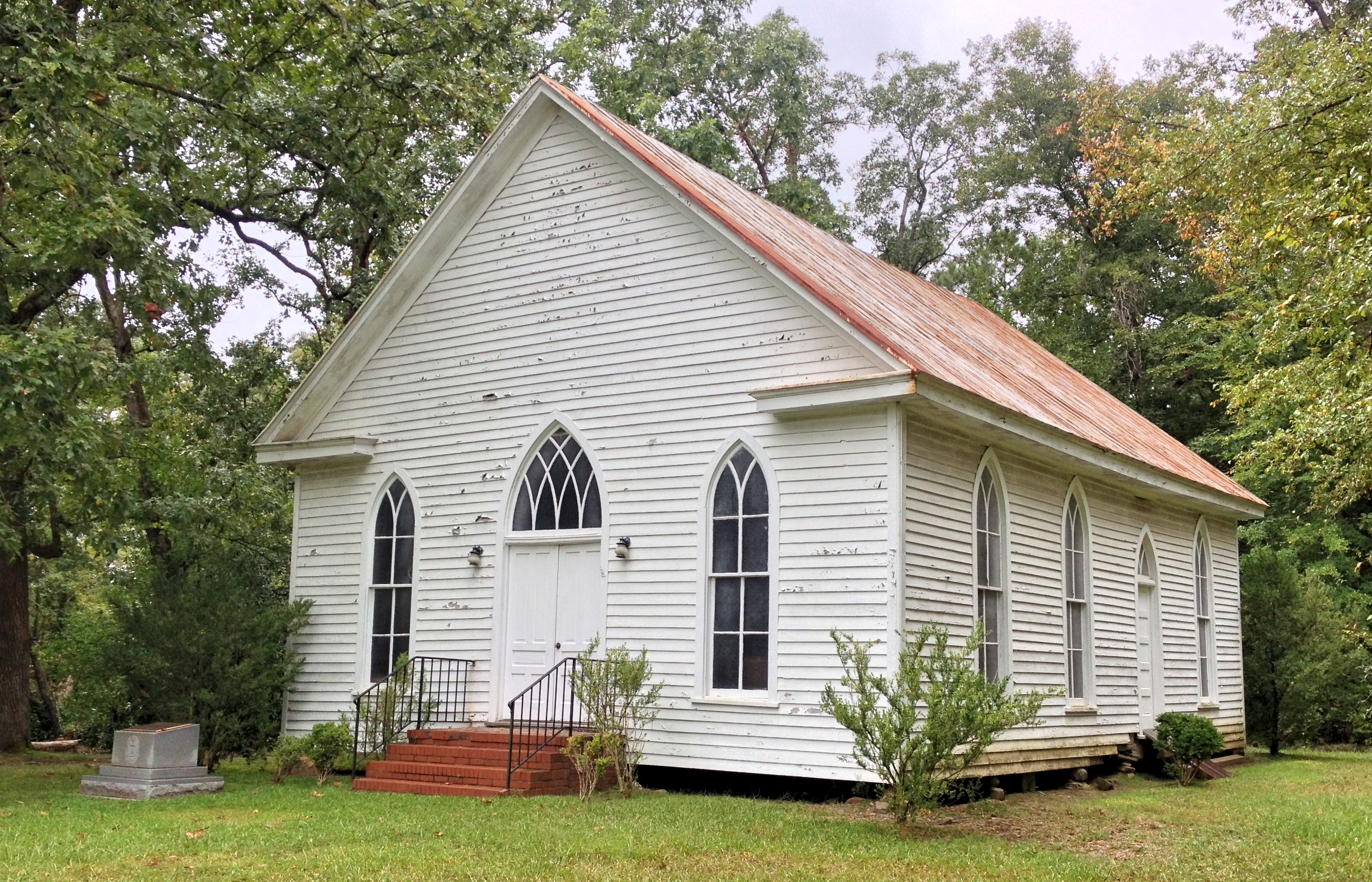

- Location within North Carolina Location within the United States
- Location: NC 751, near Farrington, North Carolina
- Coordinates: 35°51′56″N 78°56′41″W
- Area: 2 acres (0.81 ha)
- Built: c. 1900
- Architectural style: Gothic Revival
- MPS: Chatham County MRA
- NRHP reference No.: 85001457
- Added to NRHP: July 5, 1985

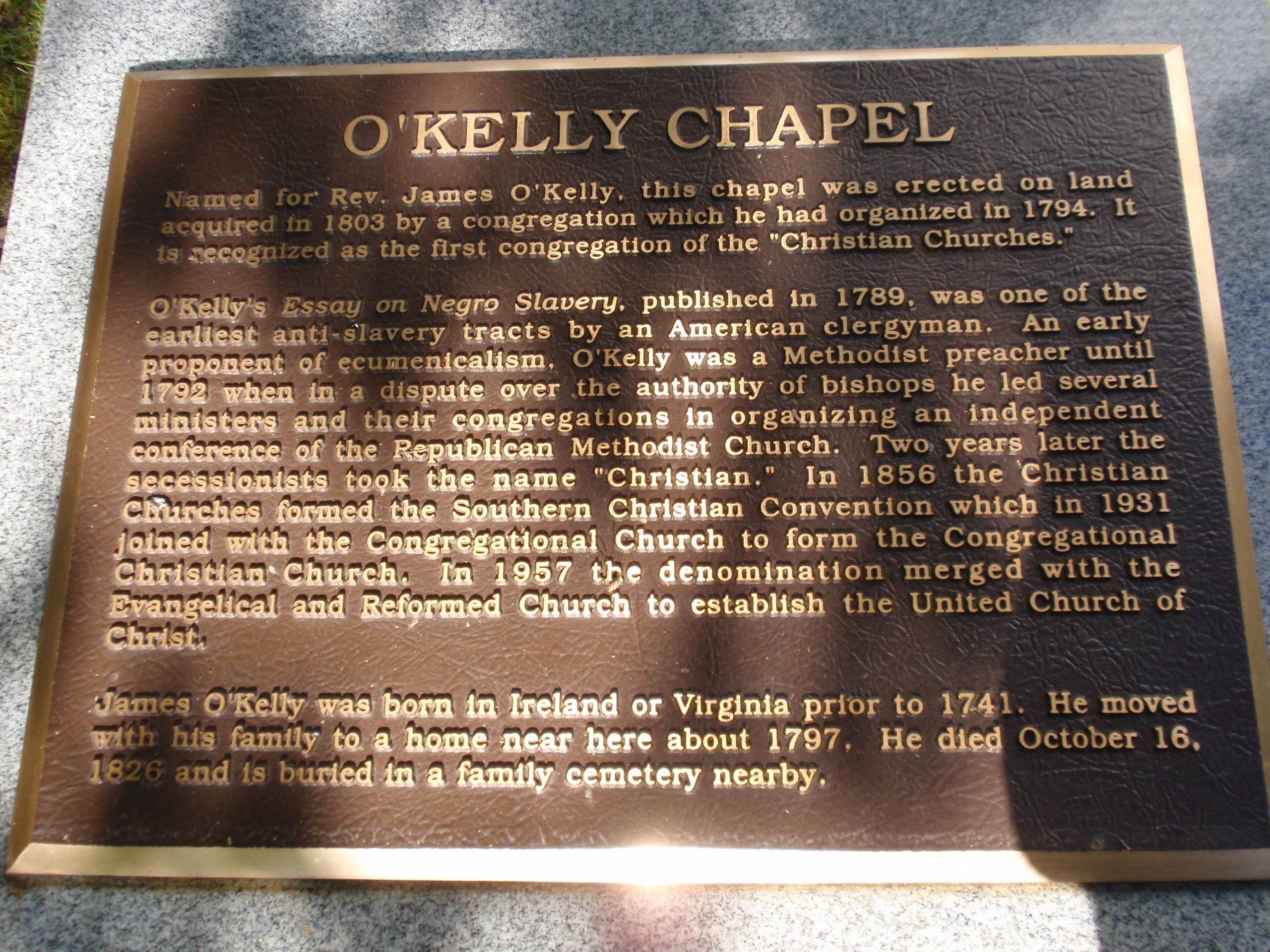
Erected by the So. Conference of the United Church of Christ

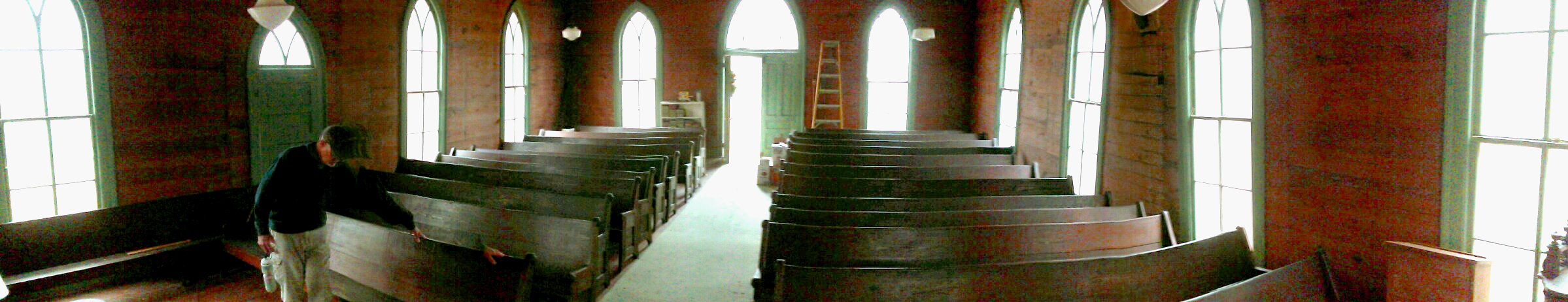
Indoor Panorama of O'Kelly's Chapel

O'Kelly's Chapel is a historic chapel located near Farrington, Chatham County, North Carolina. Named after Reverend James O'Kelly, it was built about 1900. It is a modest one-room rural chapel with Gothic Revival features including a steeply pitched roof and lancet windows.

It was listed on the National Register of Historic Places in 1985.

== History ==
O’Kelly Chapel was the home church of James O’Kelly, founder of the Christian Church. O’Kelly entered the ministry as a circuit-riding Methodist preacher in the 1780s. At that time, the Methodist Church was not an organized “denomination,” but a movement within the Church of England. After the American Revolution, these Methodist societies sought to break from England and form a church patterned after the hierarchical structure of the Church of England.

O’Kelly and others protested at the organizational conference that the church should not concentrate so much power in the bishop but be structured more democratically, with self-government for ministers and churches. O’Kelly envisioned “a republican [meaning ‘free’], no-slavery [O’Kelly's 1789 “Essay on Negro Slavery” posited that all Methodist ministers should manumit their slaves.], glorious church” that would be congregationally based. The church was to reflect the democratic principles of the newly formed United States, organized into conferences with each pastor having equal authority and laymen having a voice, too.

Eventually, due to their deep convictions, O’Kelly, 36 other ministers, and 10,000 lay people pulled out of the Methodist church to form a church association called “Republican Methodists.” In 1794 these dissenters formally took the name “Christian” and agreed to be governed by five fundamental principles:

1. The Lord Jesus Christ is the only head of the Church.

2. “Christian” is a sufficient name for the Church.

3. The Holy Bible is a sufficient rule of faith and practice.

4. Christian character is a sufficient test of fellowship and membership.

5. The right of private judgment and liberty of conscience is a right of privilege of all.

O’Kelly, leader of the movement, moved in 1794 to Chatham County, North Carolina, and gathered a congregation which eventually took the name O’Kelly Chapel. In 1797, he began a congregation in Orange County known as the Damascus Christian Church. He also began Martha's Chapel in Apex in 1803. O’Kelly served these three congregations as a circuit-riding preacher for a number of years.

The Christian Church founded by O’Kelly was primarily a movement in eastern Virginia and the upper Piedmont of North Carolina. In time, other churches were started and there were mergers with other church groups, e.g., a group of dissenting Baptist churches in Vermont. Though never a large church movement, the Christian Connection (as these churches often referred to the larger structure) was a national connection.

The congregation first worshiped together in 1794, probably in O’Kelly's home. In 1803, about two acres of land were given to the Christian Church on which to erect a church building. Over time, several different structures were built on the site. The current church, built in 1910 and shown above, is the fourth. Part of a cemetery with about 100 graves is also on the property. In 1968, the site was posted with a North Carolina Highway Historical Marker (see photo above) and listed in 1985 on the U.S. Department of the Interior, National Park Service's National Register of Historic Places.

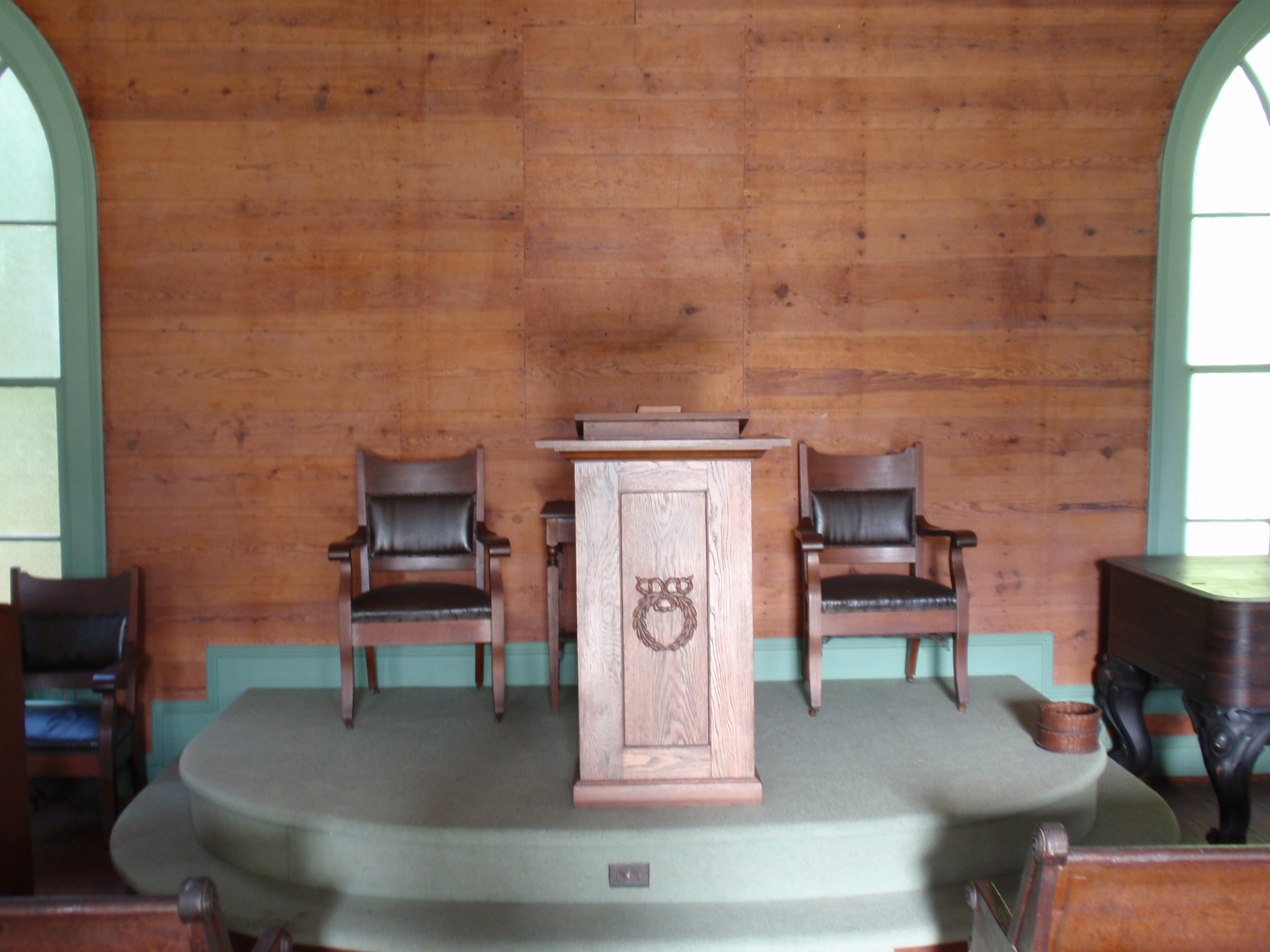
Pulpit inside the O'Kelly Chapel

Based on similar policies with emphasis on local autonomy, the Christian Church united in 1933 with the larger Congregational Church to form the Congregational Christian Church. With similar theological roots and claiming an ecumenical future for American Protestantism, the Evangelical and Reformed Church (from a German Calvinist heritage) and the Congregational Christian Church (with a mainly English Calvinist heritage) merged in 1957 to create the United Church of Christ.

== Other O'Kelly churches ==
In August 1794, a conference of dissident Methodists ministers meeting in Surry County, Virginia, finalized organization of a new denomination and adopted the name “Christian”.^{[i]} W. E. MacClenny in his 1910 biography of James O’Kelly, the denomination's founder, stated that the O’Kelly Chapel congregation in Chatham County was organized later that year and that it was the first new congregation formed by the Southern Christian denomination. It has not been possible to determine the exact date the first sanctuary was constructed; however, the original O’Kelly Chapel is “generally acknowledged to be the first church building erected by the southern Christians.” ^{[ii]} Before building churches, congregations in the new denomination worshipped in former Methodist meeting houses, structures abandoned by the Church of England, private homes, and public buildings such as courthouses and inns.

In 1922 The Southern Christian Convention merged with the American Christian Convention to form the General Convention of the Christian Church. A second merger in 1931—with the Congregational Church, (the Pilgrims of Plymouth Rock and Puritans of Massachusetts Bay), created the Congregational Christian Church. It merged in 1957 with the Evangelical and Reformed Church to form the United Church of Christ.

James O’Kelly is thought to have been born in Virginia about 1736. He married Elizabeth Meeks in 1759, and they had two children, John and William. James O’Kelly was listed as a homeowner in Mecklenburg County, Virginia, in 1787. When he led the withdrawal from the Methodist Church in 1792 - 1793, O’Kelly was the Methodist district superintendent in southern Virginia.^{[iii]}

When did the O’Kellys move to North Carolina? There is evidence for James and Elizabeth O’Kelly's move to Chatham County between 1794 and 1807. One or both sons were already in North Carolina when the parents arrived. The younger son, William, had moved to Chatham County in the mid-eighties. The O’Kelly family purchased 101 acres near the site of O’Kelly Chapel in 1797 and an additional 19 acres in 1812. James and Elizabeth O’Kelly settled on the tract purchased in 1797, which William was farming.^{[iv]}

The O’Kelly's move may have been prompted by the need to be near family because of their age or health. However, after the move, O’Kelly continued to organize new churches, visit congregations and attend church conferences. MacClenny stated that in his last years O’Kelly delivered his sermons while seated. James O’Kelly died on October 16, 1826. He was buried in the family cemetery on the farm they had purchased in 1797 near O’Kelly's Chapel.^{[v]}

In 1803 or earlier, O’Kelly organized a second Chatham County congregation, Martha's Chapel, five or six miles south of O’Kelly's Chapel. That same year, John Scott executed a deed for one acre of land:

to the said O’Kelly & the Christian Church collectively for the particular purpose of erecting a Meeting House to be occupied by way of preaching and expounding the Word of the Lord.^{[vi]}

Having secured title to the property, the Martha's Chapel congregation probably built the first sanctuary in 1803 or 1804.

Rural congregations in the early nineteenth century were small, their size limited by the distance worshipers could travel by foot, horseback or wagon to attend a mid-day service and return home before dark. The two churches, Martha’s Chapel, and O’Kelly Chapel, five or six miles apart, easily could share the pastoral services of the aging O’Kelly whose home was a short distance from O’Kelly Chapel. Both congregations remained active after O’Kelly’s death in 1826.

Researchers can track Martha’s Chapel in the minutes of their association’s annual meeting published in the Southern Christian Church’s annual report, The Christian Annual, beginning in 1870 with the earliest surviving issue, and after 1957 in the United Church of Christ’s Yearbooks. Each year churches reported the number of active members, the number of members added and removed from the church roll, church school enrollment, and the expenditures for benevolences and local church needs. The reports included the names of pastors and the year they were called to the church. Random checks reveal that Martha’s Chapel had thirty-two members in 1876, sixty-two in 1913, ninety-four in 1934, and sixty-four in 1955. In its last recorded report to the Southern Conference of the United Church of Christ in 1972, Martha’s Chapel reported fifty-six members. Martha’s Chapel ceased its affiliation with the Southern Conference of the United Church of Christ in 1972 or 1973. ^{[vii]}

The more conservative doctrine and social views held by many who were members of former Southern Christian and Reformed churches clashed with the liberal heritage of the Congregational Church. A case in point was the UCC's role in the Wilmington racial protests in the nineteen-seventies. In 1972 African-American students boycotted Wilmington schools, protesting the closing of the city's all-black high school and the handling of school integration. The integrated Congregational United Church of Christ became the gathering place for the protesters. The national UCC Commission on Racial Justice sent a young staff member, Ben Chavis, to Wilmington to organize and provide structure for the student protesters. Chavis and nine other individuals (The “Wilmington Ten”) were convicted of bombing a grocery store and conspiracy to assault responding emergency personnel. The trial received national attention and a number of churches left the denomination obscuring their connection with James O’Kelly in historical memory.

~ George Troxler, January 29, 2018

== Decommissioning ==
O’Kelly's Chapel church was formed and a worship house built on the site in 1794 after James O’Kelly departed the Methodist Church. The structure that currently sits on the property on NC 751 in northern Chatham County is the fourth structure to be erected there. The ministry on that site was guided by the “creed”, if it can be called that, of each person having “liberty of conscience,” the right and responsibility to interpret scripture in his or her own way so long as such did not violate God's law. When the Congregational Christian Churches merged with the Evangelical and Reformed Church to become the United Church of Christ (1957) the chapel became the property of the Southern Conference of the UCC.

Sometime in the early 1980s worship services ceased being held on a regular basis in O’Kelly's Chapel. Occasional weddings, confirmation classes and holiday services occupied the chapel in meaningful ways, yet even those diminished over time. The building fell into disrepair. The Southern Conference Board of Directors initiated a discernment process in 2013 to determine the chapel's future. Since there was no money or interest in repairing or improving the building, the Board decided in 2016 to sell the property.

A sale was agreed upon to For Garden's Sake, a landscape and garden supply business located immediately south of the chapel. The new owners have no plans to raze the building and continue to explore options that would encourage community involvement. Southern Conference leaders hope that the chapel can be preserved and stand as a reminder to the ministry and service of James O’Kelly.

On July 29, 2018, a decommissioning ceremony was held in the chapel to convert the land and chapel to secular use. A dozen UCC members attended, including members from Pilgrim UCC in Durham, United Church of Chapel Hill, the Southern Conference Board of Directors, the pastor of United Church of Chapel Hill and other interested persons. The brief service included some discussion of history, the abolition movement, the creation of black churches in this faith tradition as well as some stories from recent visits to the chapel by past congregants. At the conclusion of the service, a hymn penned by James O'Kelly (hymn 617 in the New Century Hymnal) was sung, composed to the tune of Amazing Grace.
