= Robert Sandeman =

Robert Sandeman may refer to:

- Robert Sandeman (theologian) (1718–1771), whose teachings became known as Sandemanianism
- Robert Groves Sandeman (1835–1892), Indian officer and administrator
