= Elias Smith =

American minister and founder of Christian Connexion (1769-1846)

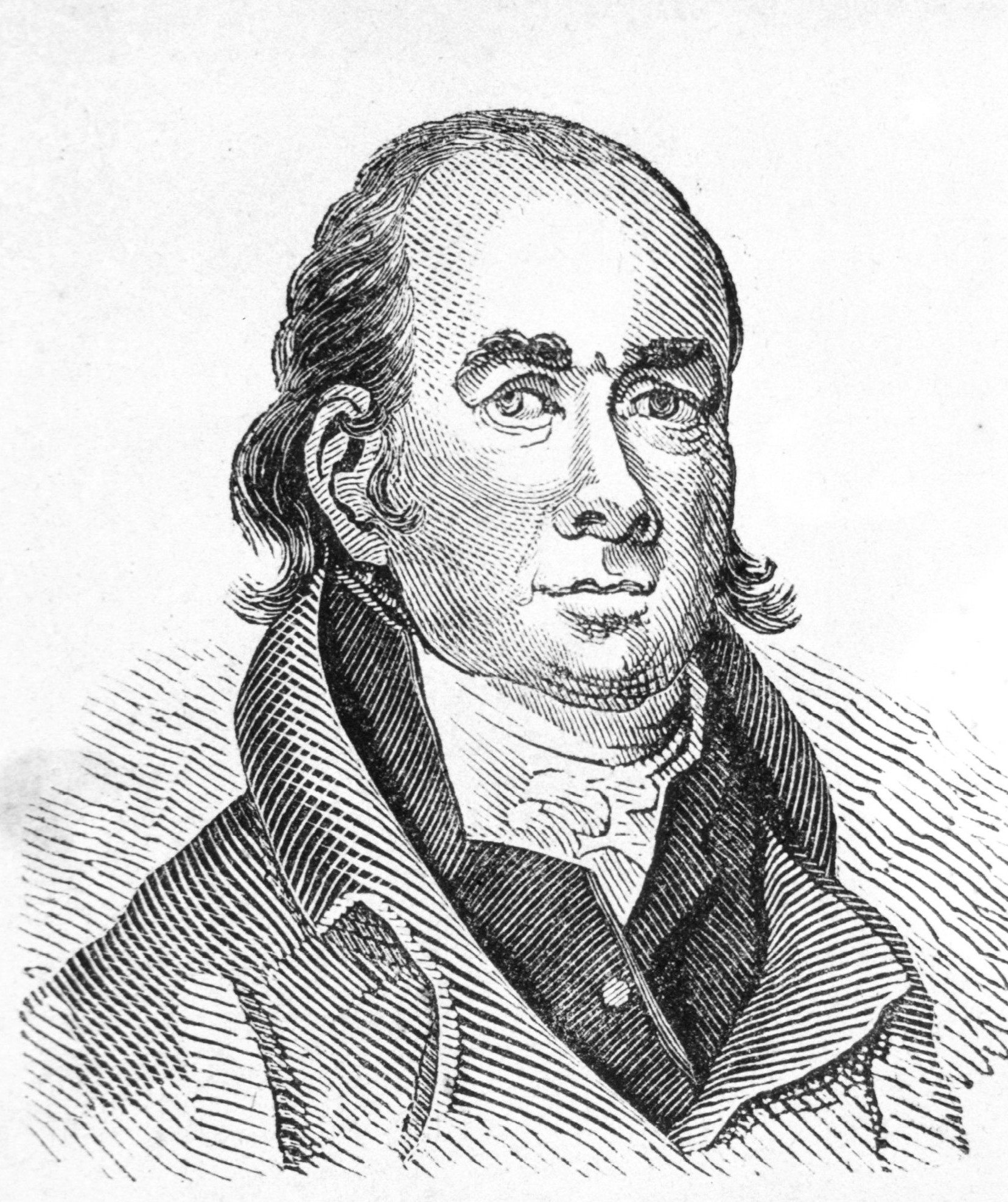

Elias Smith (June 17, 1769 – June 29, 1846) was an American preacher, medical doctor, journalist and clergyman. Smith, along with the preacher Abner Jones, founded a group of Christian Churches in New England that eventually merged with other like-minded, regional groups to become the denomination known as the Christian Connexion. Smith founded The Herald of Gospel Liberty in 1808, which he claimed (in his autobiography) to be "the world's first religious newspaper". It was not the first in the world, but may have been the first in the U.S. The Herald had two purposes: reporting news of revivals and promoting "religious liberty", by which he meant an end to tax supported churches. (Several states had official tax supported churches at the time.)

Smith proved to be a controversial figure in the Christian Connexion, leaving the denomination for several years to become a Universalist. His apostacy to Universalism encouraged the Christian Connexion to more clearly define the boundaries of its beliefs and identity. Smith publicly renounced Universalism in 1823, but was not well received and reverted to it for a couple of years. Smith again attempted a re-entry to the Connexion with another repudiation of Universalism in 1827. His brethren were understandably hesitant to accept him, but his home congregation of Portsmouth, NH received him back in fellowship in 1840.

Smith spent his later years as a vigorous proponent and practitioner of the Thomsonian system of herbal medicine, though he and Thomson had a public dispute and falling out in 1827. Smith died on June 29, 1846, in Lynn, Massachusetts.

== Writings ==
Elias Smith was a prolific author, writing and publishing many books, sermons, and hymnals. He also published an autobiography, which was labelled as "volume 1". His intention was to publish a second volume "as soon as it shall be called for by my friends and the public".

== See also ==
- Abner Jones, a co-founder of the New England Christians.
- James O'Kelly, founder of Southern Christian Churches.
- Barton Stone, founder of Christian Churches in the West.
