= Cane Ridge, Kentucky =

Place in Kentucky, United States

- Cane Ridge Rural Historic District
- U.S. National Register of Historic Places
- U.S. Historic district
- Location: Bourbon County, Kentucky
- Coordinates: 38°12′41″N 84°7′11″W
- Architectural style: Federal Style, Classical Revival
- NRHP reference No.: 02001463
- Added to NRHP: June 25, 2003

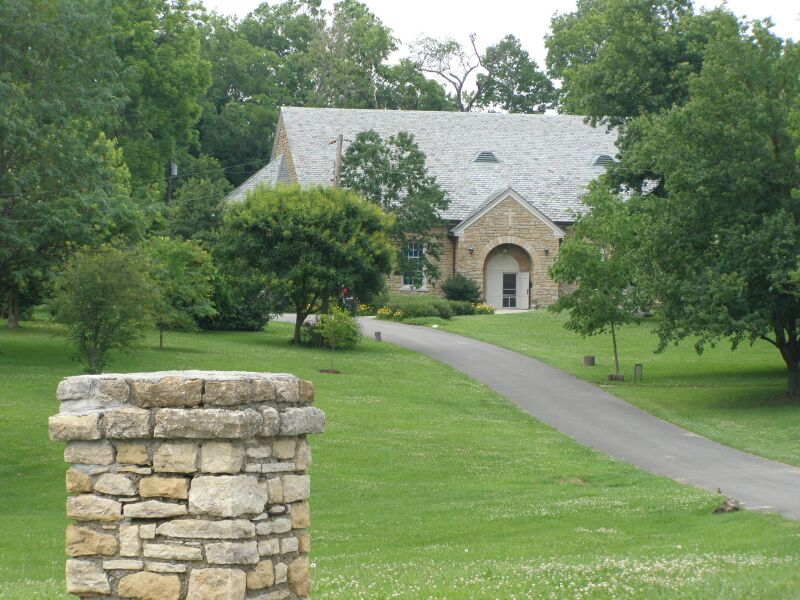
The Memorial building built over the original Cane Ridge Meeting House

Cane Ridge was the site of a huge camp meeting in 1801, the Cane Ridge Revival, that drew thousands of people and had a lasting influence as one of the landmark events of the Second Great Awakening, which took place largely in frontier areas of the United States. The event was led by eighteen Presbyterian ministers, but numerous Methodist and Baptist preachers also spoke and assisted. Many of the "spiritual exercises", such as glossolalia and ecstatic attendees, were exhibited that in the 20th century became more associated with the Pentecostal movement.

Cane Ridge is located in Bourbon County, Kentucky, near Paris. The ridge was named by the explorer Daniel Boone, who had noticed a form of bamboo growing there. The Cane Ridge building and grounds had many unusual aspects. The 1791 Cane Ridge Meeting House is believed to be the largest single-room log structure in North America. The burial ground contains an unmarked section that is among the largest in the country. A Christian church congregation met on the site for many years after the 1801 revival meeting, and the congregation's leaving the Presbyterian Church in 1804. Barton W. Stone was its minister and one of the leading ministers of the Christian Church. This place was so dear to him that at his request, several years after his death, his remains were reinterred there.

Led by Barton Stone, the Cane Ridge Revival is associated with the development of what became known as the Restoration Movement. Stone and several other ministers left the Presbyterian Church in 1804 and established the Christian Church. Another element of the Restoration Movement was Alexander Campbell's Disciples of Christ. In 1832, Stone and Campbell agreed to combine their efforts in the Restoration Movement. Later groups developed as the Churches of Christ and the Evangelical Christian Church in Canada, and several smaller groups.

== Meetinghouse ==
The Christian Church used a log building as their meeting house; it was modernized many times. When the congregation ceased to meet there regularly in the 1920s, the building fell into disuse. Later, historically minded persons, predominantly from the Disciples, restored the building and preserved it by building a stone shrine to surround and protect it.

The restoration of the original slave gallery in the meetinghouse was the oldest documented such restoration in the United States. In the 1820s, the congregation had removed the slave gallery, because they supported abolitionism. When preservationists began restoration work in the 1930s, they re-installed the original cherry-railed gallery. It was found and returned from a local barn, where it had served as a hay loft for more than a century.

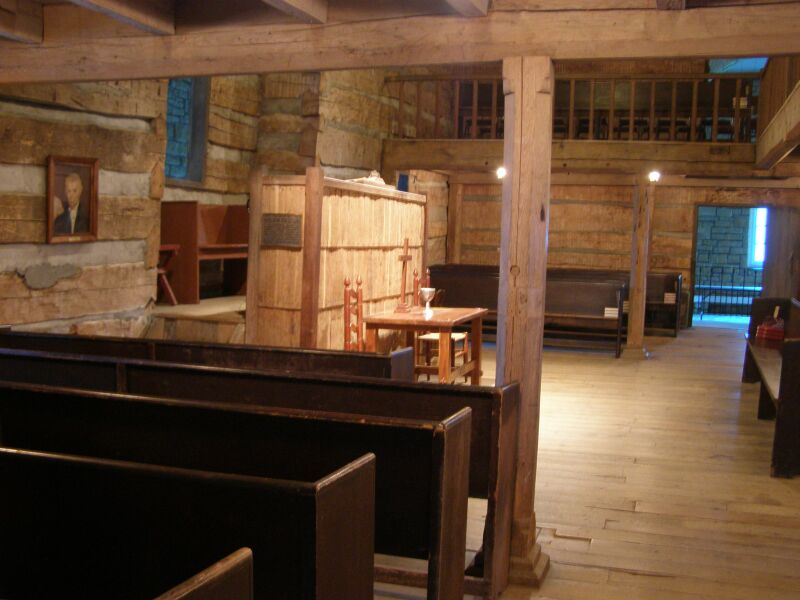
Interior of the original meeting house at Cane Ridge, Kentucky

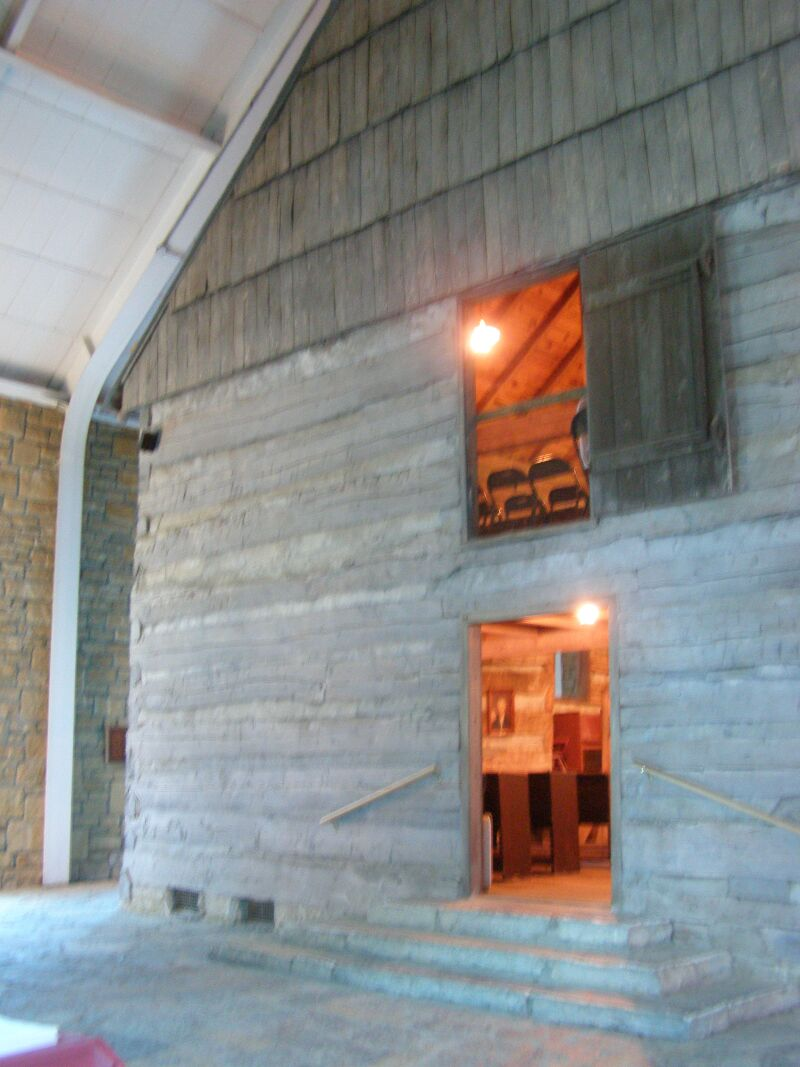
The original Cane Ridge Meeting House within the Stone Memorial Building

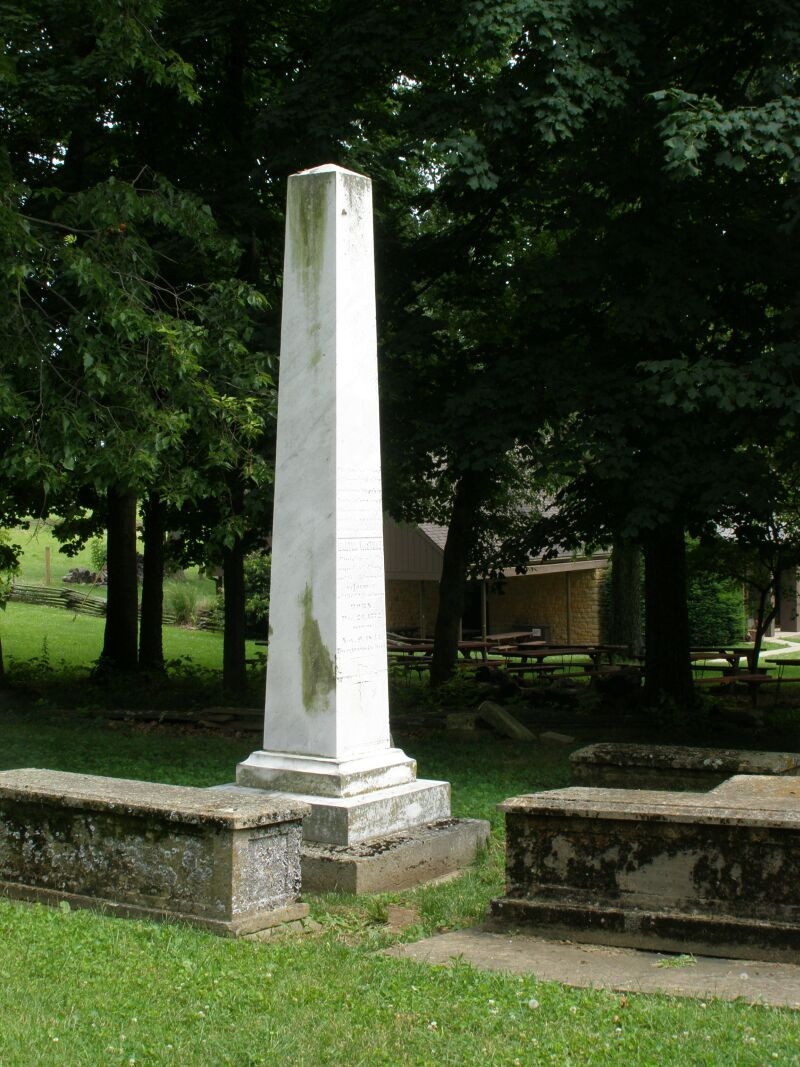
Grave of Barton Stone

The meeting house continues to be used as a living church. A curator is available for guided tours by appointment.

The Barton Warren Stone Museum contains artifacts of the congregation, Barton W. Stone and his family, the Stone-Campbell movement, and antique farm and household equipment. The museum is open only in the summer. It also houses the office of the Cane Ridge Preservation Projects and a book shop.
