= Fearrington Village, North Carolina =

- Census-designated place
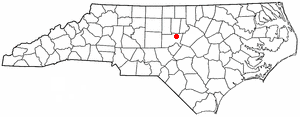
- Location of Fearrington Village, North Carolina
- Coordinates: 35°47′58″N 79°04′54″W
- Country: United States
- State: North Carolina
- County: Chatham

Area
  - Total: 1.79 sq mi (4.64 km^{2})
  - Land: 1.79 sq mi (4.63 km^{2})
  - Water: 0.0039 sq mi (0.01 km^{2})
- Elevation: 440 ft (130 m)

Population (2020)
  - Total: 2,557
  - Density: 1,431/sq mi (552.7/km^{2})
- Time zone: UTC-5 (Eastern (EST))
  - Summer (DST): UTC-4 (EDT)
- ZIP code: 27312
- Area codes: 919 and 984
- FIPS code: 37-22982
- GNIS feature ID: 2402476

Fearrington Village is a residential development and census-designated place (CDP) in Chatham County, North Carolina, United States. The population was 2,339 at the 2010 census, up from 903 in 2000. The 2020 census counted 2,557 residents. Its name is phonetically pronounced FAIR-ington, not FEAR-ington as the spelling might indicate. The CDP occupies what was formerly the area of the unincorporated community of Farrington. It is a mixed-use community located on farmland dating back to the 18th century in Pittsboro, North Carolina. The community is located about 15 minutes from Chapel Hill, a half-hour from Durham and 45 minutes from Raleigh.

== Geography ==
Fearrington Village is located in northeastern Chatham County. U.S. Routes 15 and 501 form the northwestern edge of the community, leading north 8 miles (13 km) to Chapel Hill and south 8 miles (13 km) to Pittsboro, the Chatham County seat.

According to the United States Census Bureau, the CDP has a total area of 1.8 square miles (4.6 km^{2}), of which 0.004 square miles (0.01 km^{2}), or 0.32%, is water.

== Demographics ==
Historical population
| Census | Pop. | Note | %± |
|---|---|---|---|
| 2020 | 2,557 | | — |
U.S. Decennial Census

=== 2020 census ===
As of the 2020 census, Fearrington Village had a population of 2,557. The median age was 73.9 years. 2.3% of residents were under the age of 18 and 78.2% of residents were 65 years of age or older. For every 100 females there were 73.0 males, and for every 100 females age 18 and over there were 71.7 males age 18 and over.

100.0% of residents lived in urban areas, while 0.0% lived in rural areas.

There were 1,493 households in Fearrington Village, including 787 families. Of these households, 5.2% had children under the age of 18 living in them. Of all households, 51.2% were married-couple households, 8.3% were households with a male householder and no spouse or partner present, and 36.8% were households with a female householder and no spouse or partner present. About 39.3% of all households were made up of individuals, and 33.4% had someone living alone who was 65 years of age or older.

There were 1,605 housing units, of which 7.0% were vacant. The homeowner vacancy rate was 1.4% and the rental vacancy rate was 4.2%.

Fearrington Village racial composition
| Race | Number | Percentage |
|---|---|---|
| White (non-Hispanic) | 2,378 | 93.0% |
| Black or African American (non-Hispanic) | 26 | 1.02% |
| Native American | 1 | 0.04% |
| Asian | 29 | 1.13% |
| Pacific Islander | 1 | 0.04% |
| Other/Mixed | 67 | 2.62% |
| Hispanic or Latino | 55 | 2.15% |

=== 2010 census ===
As of the census of 2010, there were 2,339 people.

=== 2000 census ===
As of the census of 2000, there were 903 people, 506 households, and 357 families residing in the CDP. The population density was 391.9 inhabitants per square mile (151.3/km^{2}). There were 533 housing units at an average density of 231.3 per square mile (89.3/km^{2}). The racial makeup of the CDP was 96.79% White, 2.99% African American, 0.11% Pacific Islander, and 0.11% from two or more races. Hispanic or Latino of any race were 0.22% of the population.

There were 506 households, out of which 2.4% had children under the age of 18 living with them, 67.0% were married couples living together, 3.2% had a female householder with no husband present, and 29.4% were non-families. 27.9% of all households were made up of individuals, and 20.9% had someone living alone who was 65 years of age or older. The average household size was 1.78 and the average family size was 2.08.

In the CDP, the population was spread out, with 2.1% under the age of 18, 0.8% from 18 to 24, 5.6% from 25 to 44, 19.6% from 45 to 64, and 71.9% who were 65 years of age or older. The median age was 70 years. For every 100 females, there were 79.2 males. For every 100 females age 18 and over, there were 77.9 males.

The median income for a household in the CDP was $66,198, and the median income for a family was $68,281. Males had a median income of $55,278 versus $28,068 for females. The per capita income for the CDP was $41,000. About 3.8% of families and 6.8% of the population were below the poverty line, including 9.3% of those under age 18 and 1.9% of those age 65 or over.

=== Demographic estimates ===
A 2018 analysis by the National Center for Health Statistics found that the life expectancy in Fearrington is 97 years old.

== History ==
The community began in 1974 when R.B. Fitch and his late wife Jenny purchased the two-century old dairy farm from Jesse Fearrington. He had inherited the 640 acre property, originally purchased for 100 shillings in 1786 from John Oldham by his great-great-great-grandfather, William Cole.

Located midway between Chapel Hill and Pittsboro along U.S. 15-501 in Chatham County, Fearrington currently occupies about 1,200 acres (4.9 km^{2}).

The Fitches aimed to recreate the smaller villages of England and modeled the Fearrington Village Center after those hamlets long before the term "mixed-use community" had been popularized.

Over the last 30 years the community has grown to include over 1800 residents, a country inn and restaurant (The Fearrington House), a cafe & bar, various shops, and artist studios.

The Fearrington House Country Inn is one of only two AAA five-diamond facilities in the state, earning the Five Diamond designation 15 years in a row, more times than any other accommodation in the Carolinas. The Inn is also North Carolina's only five-star hotel, according to Mobil Travel Guide's annual rankings.

Belted Galloway cows, the village's iconic mascot, were added to the farm in 1983.
