= Cane Ridge Meeting House =

Historic building in Kentucky, United States

Coordinates: 38°12′46″N 84°07′09″W

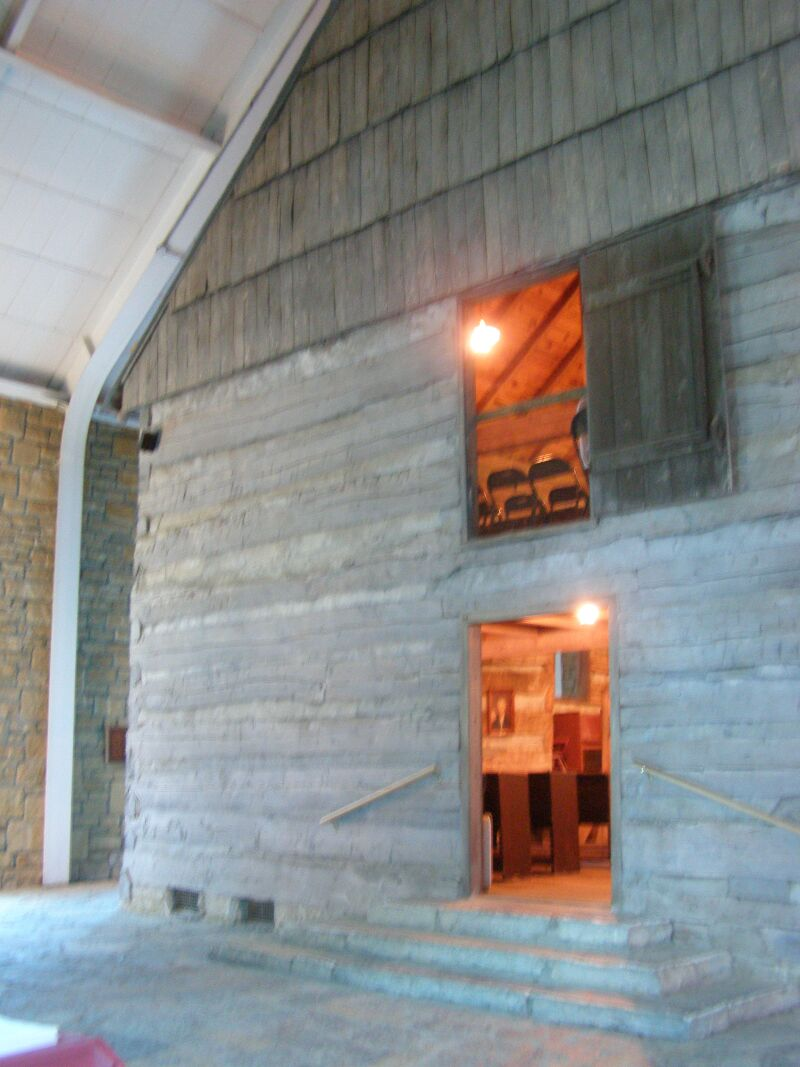
The original Cane Ridge Meeting House within the Stone Memorial Building

Cane Ridge Meeting House is a historic church building on Cane Ridge near Paris, Kentucky built in 1791. It is one of the oldest church buildings in Kentucky and the largest one room log structure. The church was the site of a large frontier Christian revival in 1801 hosted by the local Presbyterian congregation that met in the building, with nearly 10,000 people attending. According to the museum "[i]n 1804, a small group of Presbyterian ministers from Kentucky and Ohio... penned and signed a document, "The Last Will and Testament of the Springfield Presbytery", at Cane Ridge that resulted in the birth of a movement seeking unity among Christians along non-sectarian lines. They would call themselves simply "Christians. The Christian Church (Disciples of Christ), the Churches of Christ (non-instrumental), and the Christian Churches (independent) of the Stone-Campbell movement trace their origins here. This movement is often noted as the first one indigenous to American soil." In the 1930s a stone building was constructed around the original log structure. The church is still used for worship.

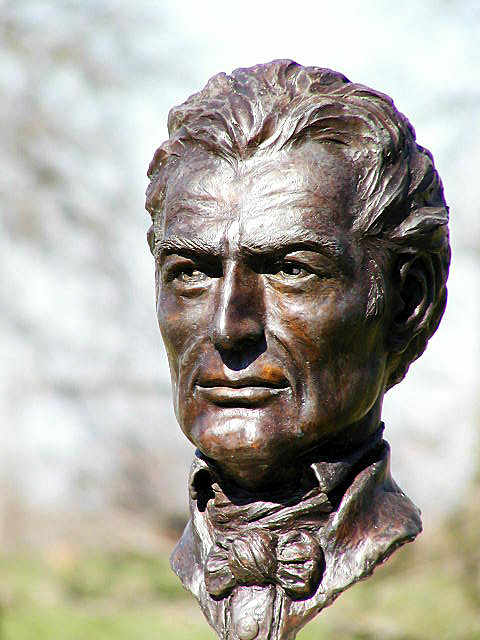
Bust of Barton W. Stone, in cemetery at Cane Ridge

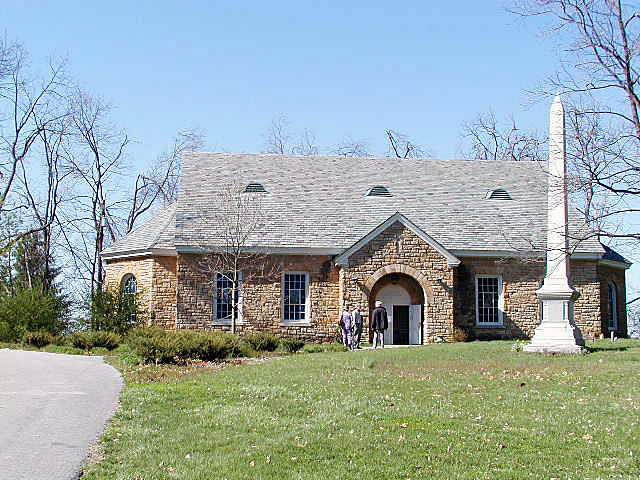
Cane Ridge "Shrine", built around the Meeting House in 1954

== Images ==
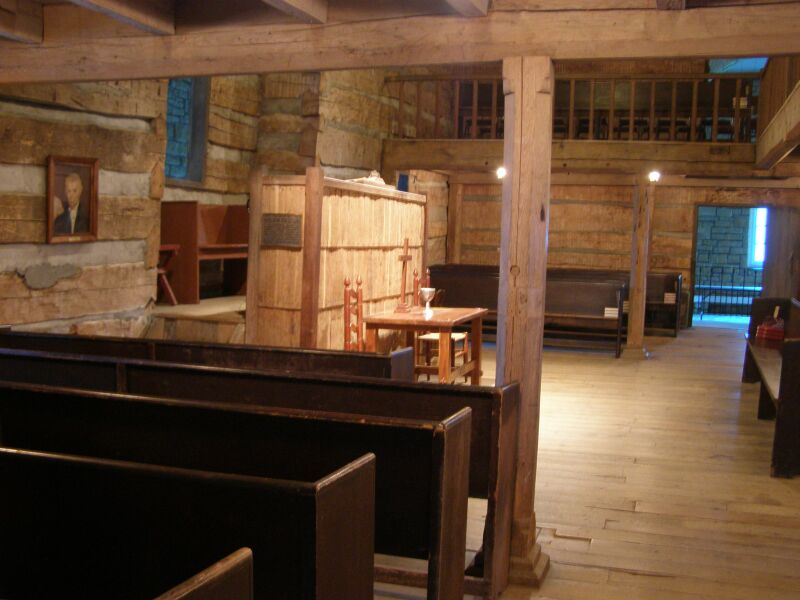
Interior of the original meeting house at Cane Ridge, Kentucky

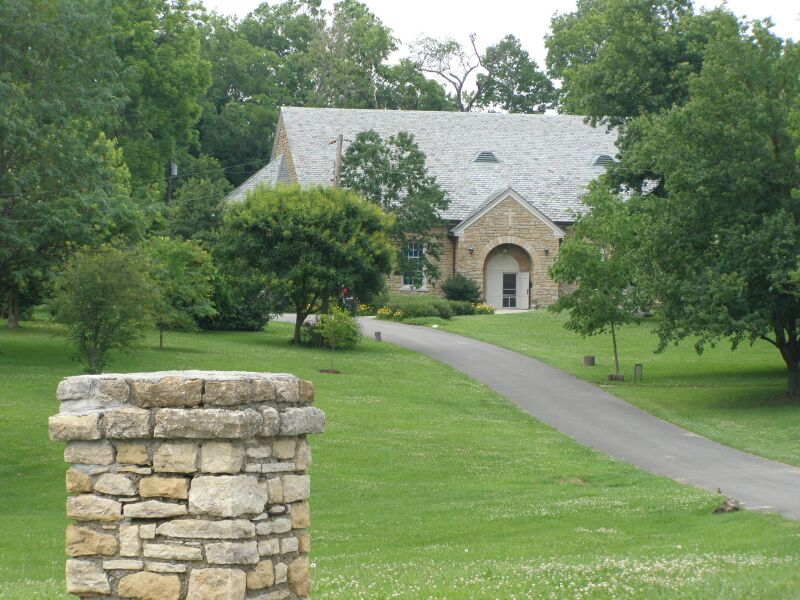
The Memorial building built over the original Cane Ridge Meeting House

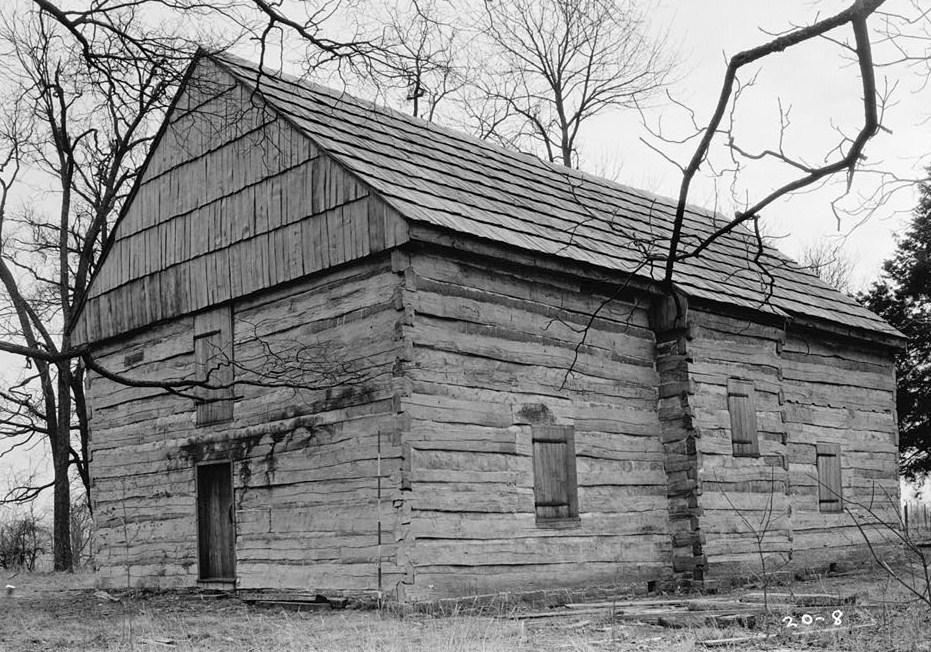
Cane Ridge Meeting House in 1934, Little Rock Road, Paris vicinity (Bourbon County, Kentucky)

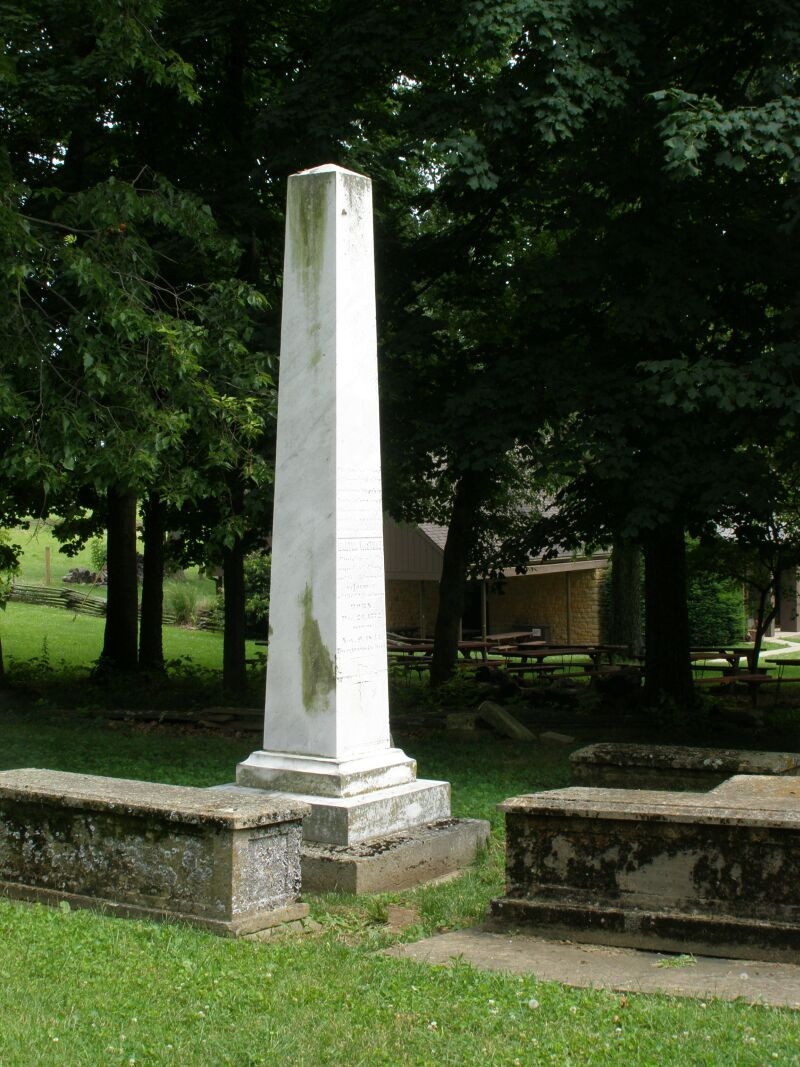
Grave of Barton Stone

== See also ==
- List of the oldest churches in the United States
- List of the oldest buildings in Kentucky
