= Cane Ridge Revival =

1801 Christian meeting in Kentucky, US

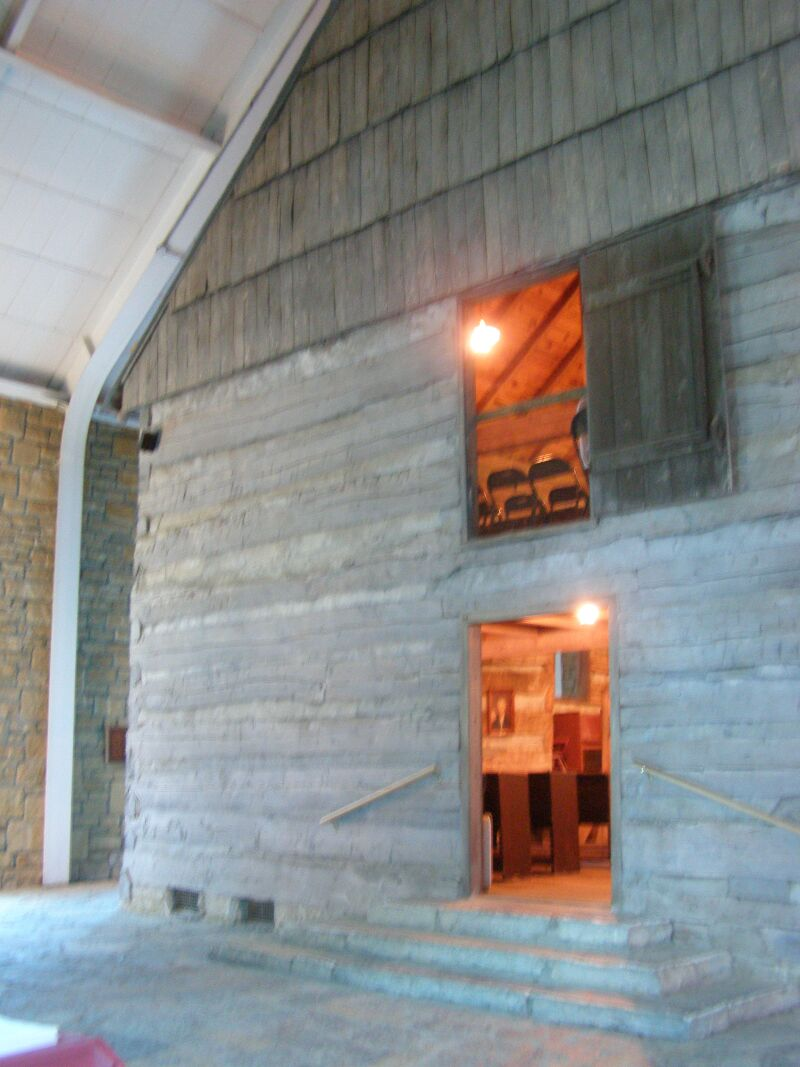
The original Cane Ridge Meeting House within the Stone Memorial Building

The Cane Ridge Revival was a large camp meeting that was held in Cane Ridge, Kentucky, from August 6 to August 12 or 13, 1801. It was the "[l]argest and most famous camp meeting of the Second Great Awakening." This camp meeting launched a multitude of smaller camp meetings on the frontier. In turn they stimulated a deeply personalized religious experience of salvation in hundreds of thousands of men and women.

== Location and attendance ==
It was based at the Cane Ridge Meeting House near Paris (Bourbon County) and drew between 10,000 and 20,000 people. According to The Encyclopedia of the Stone-Campbell Movement, logistical considerations make it unlikely that more than 10,000 could have been present at any one time, but 20,000 could have attended the meeting at some time during the week, which would have been "nearly 10 percent of the recorded population of Kentucky in 1800". At least one, and possibly more, speaking platforms were constructed outside the building because the number of attendees far exceeded the capacity of the meeting house.

== Hosting and organization ==
The meeting was hosted by the Presbyterian church at Cane Ridge and its minister, Barton W. Stone. The church decided to invite other local Presbyterian and Methodist churches to participate in its annual Communion service. Ministers from Presbyterian, Methodist and Baptist backgrounds participated. Eighteen Presbyterian ministers participated, as well as numerous Methodists and Baptists, but the event was based on Scottish traditions of Holy Fairs or communion seasons.

The meeting began on a Friday evening with preaching continuing through Saturday, and the observation of communion beginning on Sunday. Traditional elements included the "large number of ministers, the action sermon, the tables, the tent, the successive servings" of communion, all part of the evangelical Presbyterian tradition and "communion season" known in Scotland. An estimated 800 to 1,100 received communion. During the meeting multiple ministers would preach at the same time in different locations within the camp area, some using stumps, wagons and fallen trees as makeshift platforms.
