= James O'Kelly =

American Methodist

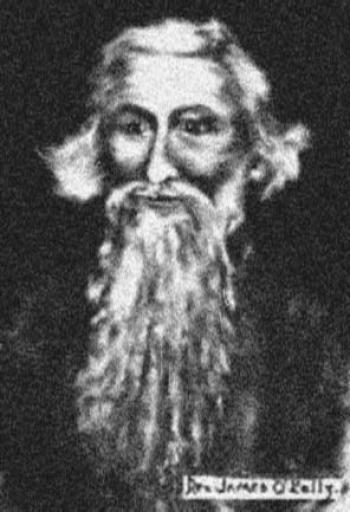
James O'Kelly.

James O'Kelly (1735 – October 16, 1826) was an American clergyman during the Second Great Awakening and an important figure in the early history of Methodism in America. He was also known for his outspoken views on abolitionism, penning the strong antislavery work, Essay on Negro Slavery.

== Life ==
Appointed as a Methodist circuit rider in 1777, he organized preaching circuits on the frontier in central and southeastern North Carolina during the American Revolutionary War. He continued his affiliation with the Methodist Episcopal Church from its formal organization in 1784 at the Christmas Conference, when he was ordained an elder. Well regarded as a preacher, he successfully supervised pastors in several regions of Virginia and North Carolina.

O'Kelly, who favored the congregationalist system of church polity, came to oppose the church's system of centralized episcopal authority, which he believed infringed on the freedom of preachers. At the 1792 General Conference of the Methodist Church, he introduced a resolution to allow clergy to appeal to the Conference if they believed their assignments from the bishop to be unsatisfactory. After several days of debate, the resolution was defeated.

In protest, O'Kelly withdrew from the denomination and with his supporters founded the Republican Methodist Church, later known simply as the Christian Church, or "Connection". The O'Kelly-led schism is recognized as the first schism of the Methodist Episcopal Church. Some of its members also became involved in the related Stone-Campbell movement. O'Kelly later published his position in a tract entitled The Author's Apology for Protesting against the Methodist Episcopal Government (1798). In this piece O'Kelly claims that the Methodist Bishops Francis Asbury and Thomas Coke were not elected to the episcopacy by the Conference. O'Kelly is answered in 1800 by Nicholas Snethen. Snethen accuses O'Kelly of propagating "notorious falsehoods." O'Kelly, not one to let the argument rest, responds with his A Vindication of an Apology.

The Christian Connection or Christian Church, as it was later more commonly known, merged with the Congregational churches in 1931 to form the Congregational Christian Churches. In 1957, a majority of churches from this association merged with the Evangelical and Reformed Church, developed by German Americans from their historic immigrant traditions, to form the present United Church of Christ.

O'Kelly died in 1826 in Chatham County, North Carolina, aged 90 or 91. O'Kelly's Chapel, built about 1900 and named after him, was listed on the National Register of Historic Places in 1985.

== See also ==
- Methodist Protestant Church – an 1828 schism in the Methodist Episcopal Church over similar issues that had led to O'Kelly's exit
- Methodist New Connexion in Britain.
- Moore, M. H. Pioneers of Methodism in North Carolina and Virginia, 1884.
- Kilgore, Charles Franklin. The James O'Kelly Schism in the Methodist Episcopal Church, 1963.
