= Revival of 1800 =

18th-century series of evangelical Christian meetings in the United States

The Revival of 1800, also known as the Red River Revival, was a series of evangelical Christian meetings which began in Logan County, Kentucky. These ignited the subsequent events and influenced several of the leaders of the Second Great Awakening. The events represented a transition from British traditions to innovations arising from the unique needs and culture of Americans in the new century, especially on the frontier. The startling manifestations of revival fervor that first occurred in June 1800 at the Red River Meeting House, a small Presbyterian congregation led by James McGready, began as a Scottish sacrament service, but led to the important innovation of serial religious services later known as camp meetings.

These multi-day gatherings hosted people from great distances for outdoor services focused on arousing the heart-felt conversion and religious enthusiasm that came to characterize especially rural evangelicalism throughout the nineteenth century. The Logan County revival quickly spread into the larger Cumberland region of southwestern Kentucky and middle Tennessee. It expanded outward in all directions, attracting the attention of evangelical leaders such as Presbyterian-turned-Disciples of Christ leader, Barton Stone, and Methodists Francis Asbury and Peter Cartwright, as well as leaders in the Shaker and Cumberland Presbyterian movements, all of whom attended the revival meetings in their initial year-long period, beginning in June 1800 and continuing through May 1801.

== Background ==
=== North Carolina ===
James McGready arrived in Logan County in 1797, but he had become a seasoned revivalist in North Carolina. His first congregation had been in Guilford County, a center of evangelical Presbyterian revivals in the late 1780s and early 1790s. The churches were recovering from the cultural readjustment of post-revolutionary America that, in many cases, left institutional religion in a weakened state. As states disestablished their churches following the war, the Anglican Church in the South was particularly affected, having fallen out of favor during the Revolution because of its association with Great Britain. More than this, the country showed a general lack of interest in religion, focusing instead on populating the western frontier, regaining economic footing, and creating a new nation. In addition, well publicized attacks on Christianity were made by deists Ethan Allen, the hero of Fort Ticonderoga, and Thomas Paine, the famous author of Common Sense. In 1794, Paine published The Age of Reason, which attacked supernatural elements of Christianity in favor of rationalist philosophy. In Guilford County, and in the Carolinas generally, the war had been especially cruel. One nineteenth-century chronicler blamed "the march of armies" for leaving plunder, vice, "dissipation and immorality" in its wake."

Within this post-war setting McGready took part in several sporadic revivals, first in Virginia, at Hampden-Sydney College (1787-9), and then in Guilford County in 1791, in conjunction with a school where several of his future colleagues, including Barton Stone, studied for a career in politics under Presbyterian David Caldwell. McGready's hard-hitting sermons on the sinfulness of people and their need for conversion demanded a response to the tenets of Christianity that was beyond intellectual assent; McGready advocated a heartfelt and "sensible" religion centered on the doctrine of regeneration, or the new birth. McGready's preaching, however, was not without controversy. His appeals were convincing to Stone in regard to his sinfulness, but were no source of relief for the state of his tortured soul. Calvinist doctrine, as taught by the Scots-Irish Presbyterians, espoused limited atonement, that is, the belief that Christ's sacrifice for sin was available only to those who were predestined for salvation. Years later, Stone would reflect that he had "anticipated a long and painful struggle before I should…get religion. … For one year I was tossed on the waves of uncertainty…sometimes desponding and almost despairing." Stone eventually responded, with a sense of his own conversion, to the appeals of one of McGready's associates, William Hodge, who spoke not of the flames of hell, but of the love of God for sinners.

Others in the community responded to McGready, not with contrition, but threats. One Sunday, McGready arrived at his church to discover a bloody note, accompanying his burned-out pulpit, demanding that he leave the area or face the consequences. Responding to an invitation to minister in Logan County, Kentucky, McGready soon left North Carolina. Several ministers with whom he had worked in Guilford County, including William Hodge, John Rankin, William McAdow, and the brothers John and William McGee, would eventually join him to minister in various congregations in the Cumberland frontier of middle Tennessee and southwestern Kentucky.

=== Kentucky in the 1790s ===
Many of the socio-religious conditions in Kentucky mirrored those of the country in general in post-revolutionary America. McGready complained that Kentuckians were worldly people whose conversations were "of corn and tobacco, or land and stock…. the name of Jesus has no charms; and it is rarely mentioned unless to be profaned." The rush for land produced a change in post-war demographics that were perhaps nowhere as dramatic as in Kentucky. In 1790, the population was about 73,000, roughly sixteen percent of whom were slaves, with most of the population concentrated in the central Bluegrass area near Lexington. By 1800, the population had almost tripled to 221,000, and had expanded farther west, spurred by the decisive Battle of Fallen Timbers in 1794. This defeat of confederated Indian tribes near Toledo, Ohio, by General Anthony Wayne, effectively ended the threat of Indian attack in Kentucky by the middle of the decade. Though people of all classes came to Kentucky, the influx of large numbers of the poor in search of land produced a dramatic effect on the country as a whole. The 1800 United States census revealed that seven percent of the U. S. population lived west of the Alleghenies in what is now Kentucky, Tennessee and Ohio. By 1810, the population in Kentucky had swelled to almost double that of 1800, to 406,000.

Early settlers were fiercely independent and egalitarian; skilled with the long rifle; and fond of fighting, gambling, tobacco chewing, and horse racing. Church attendance was sparse even in settled areas, largely because few ministers were called to the area until after 1794. By 1799, there were only twenty-six licensed Presbyterian ministers in Kentucky. Sectarian controversies were common among the churches in the more settled areas. In the backcountry where few churches existed, early Methodist itinerant ministers such as the English missionary Francis Asbury rode on horseback thousands of miles yearly to establish circuits to reach remote settlements. In 1796, the same year McGready came to Kentucky, Asbury quoted in his journal the dismal prediction he had heard about the region: "The ministers in Kentucky will be a curse to each other, and the people too; good religion and good land are not so easily matched together."

=== Scottish sacrament season ===
When McGready came to Logan County, he brought with him a long tradition known as the Scottish sacrament season, which was still being practiced regularly by Presbyterian congregations. Begun in Scotland after the tumultuous changes of the Scottish Reformation in the mid-seventeenth century, the sacrament season replaced Catholic Corpus Christi festivals. It served as a response to fears that Protestant religion had lost its communal expression, making religion an increasingly privatized affair.

The sacrament season was conducted over several days, in warm weather months. It included outdoor preaching, large numbers of attendees, who had often traveled long distances, long vigils of prayer, and often dramatic conversion experiences. One of the largest of these observances took place in 1742 in Cambuslang, outside Glasgow, Scotland, where upwards of 30,000 people came to hear the preaching of George Whitefield. Sacrament observances such as Cambuslang, whose timing coincided with the Great Awakening in England, Ireland, and the American Colonies throughout the 1740s, had become associated with revivalism. Both clergy and lay people had the expectation that the communion season would bring "the most intense religious experiences, the most agonizing despair and the most ecstatic joy."

Scottish sacrament observances were recreated in America in the early eighteenth century when large numbers of Ulster Scots immigrated to the colonies. During the Great Awakening in the American colonies, Irish Presbyterian revivalists William and Gilbert Tennent presided over the communion festivals, while Congregationalist David Brainerd also followed the Scottish pattern in his missionary work among American Indians. The four-day pattern was common: Friday was designated as a day of fasting and prayer. On Saturday, further inward preparation continued with preaching, usually by several ministers. Sunday was the observance of the Lord's Supper, and Monday was a day of thanksgiving.

The focus of the sacrament season was participation in the Lord's Supper. For Scots-Irish Presbyterians, inclusion in this ritual was guarded closely and accompanied by several symbols of exclusivity. First, preparation was necessary on the part of the communicant as well as the ministers charged with interviewing each person in advance and approving his sincerity and worthiness. Communion tokens, small emblems made usually from lead and stamped with the date, and sometimes the initials of the minister, were required for admission to communion. These were given only to those approved by the minister, and had to be surrendered to an elder by every person approaching the communion table. A second symbol of exclusivity was the fencing of the tables. Set apart from the rest of the congregation, these tables were often covered with the best and finest linens available and sometimes "fenced" with a rail as the minister described the qualifications of communicants as a further barrier against those who had not been formally invited and approved.

Once admitted to the table, the exclusivity ended. All participants—male and female, young and old, cleric and lay person- served one another common bread and wine, representing the body and blood of Christ. The often intense preparation and elements of exclusivity meant that only a fraction of those who attended these events were able to participate in the communion ritual. Non-participants included children and observers who were unsure of their status as among the converted, and many were curious bystanders and irreligious people who had come for social, rather than religious reasons. As in the later nineteenth-century revivals, the spectacle of the sacrament season, both inside and outside the meeting house, and the large influx of people coming for diverse reasons from considerable distances, sometimes produced a carnival-like atmosphere.

It is clear that McGready saw a connection between the sacrament season and revival. In his written account of the events of 1800, sixteen of seventeen revival meetings were connected to sacrament observances. McGready also revealed his openness to innovations associated with distinctly American influences as well, and he promoted the introduction of the camp meeting into the sacrament tradition in pioneer Kentucky.

=== Logan County in 1797 ===
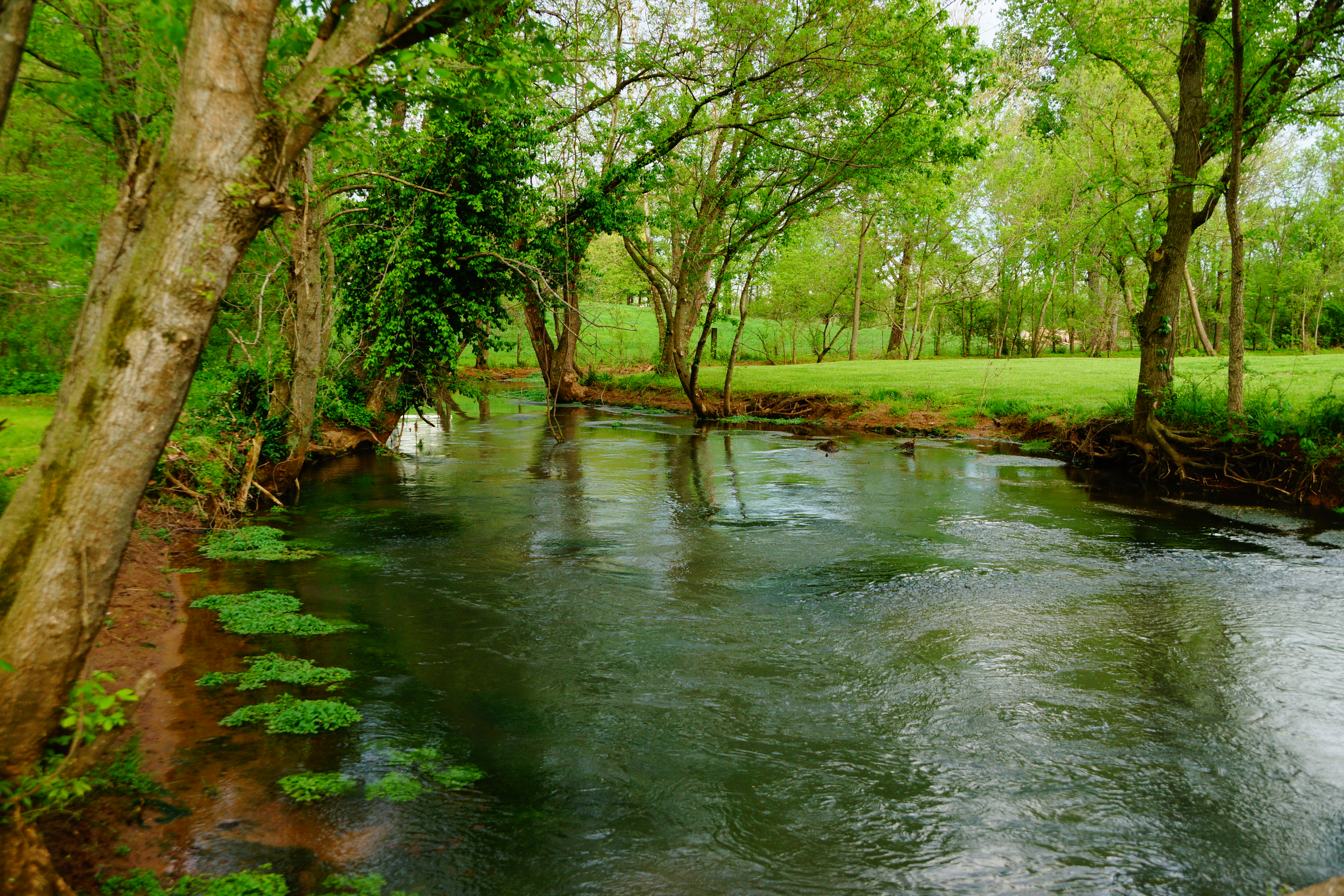
The Red River in Logan County, KY, 2014

James McGready was granted a minister's license in Logan County, Kentucky, in January 1797. As the area's first resident Presbyterian minister, he led three small congregations: The largest was Red River, with about twenty-five members. The other two were at Gasper River, and Muddy River. The Red River congregation had been pioneered by Thomas Craighead, who, in 1785, was the first minister to serve the Kentucky frontier community from his base in the Nashville, Tennessee area. Craighead, a graduate of the College of New Jersey, (later Princeton University) provided a sharp contrast to the plain-spoken McGready, a graduate of a small "log college" in Pennsylvania led by John McMillan. The latter graduated from the College of New Jersey and was the first Presbyterian to establish a church west of the Alleghenies. The differences between Craighead and McGready were stark: "If Dr. Craighead was more graceful in his manner, polished in his style," said one man who had heard both men preach, "Mr. McGready was more earnest…and solemn in his appeals to the conscience."

Not long after arriving in Logan County, McGready began trying to convince the people of his congregations of the need for a religion that was experiential and life altering. By May of his first year, some in his Gasper River congregation felt the first stirrings of revival when eight or nine people were converted. But the excitement was short lived, and the winter resulted in a return to spiritual malaise. At this point, McGready instituted regular prayer and fasting to be observed in the churches on the last Saturday of each month.

By the summer of 1798, the sacrament observances were the site of more conversions, but criticism circulated by rival Presbyterian minister James Balch, recently arrived from another community, brought conflict and doubt and, according to McGready, quelled the enthusiasm, so that again, stagnation followed. In July of the following year, McGready noticed a "remarkable spirit of prayer and supplication…a sensible, heart-felt burden of the dreadful state of sinners" among those in his congregations. At Red River, McGready reported the conversion of "bold and daring sinners" weeping bitterly. At the subsequent sacrament at Gasper River, he reported the first incidences of a phenomenon that would continue to characterize the assemblies—people falling into swoons with groans and loud cries for mercy, often lying helpless for hours. Similar results followed at subsequent sacrament observances as McGready and other area ministers traveled throughout the Cumberland region to congregations at Muddy River, Clay Lick, and The Ridge, a congregation in Tennessee.

== The revival begins: Summer 1800 ==
=== The Sacrament at Red River ===
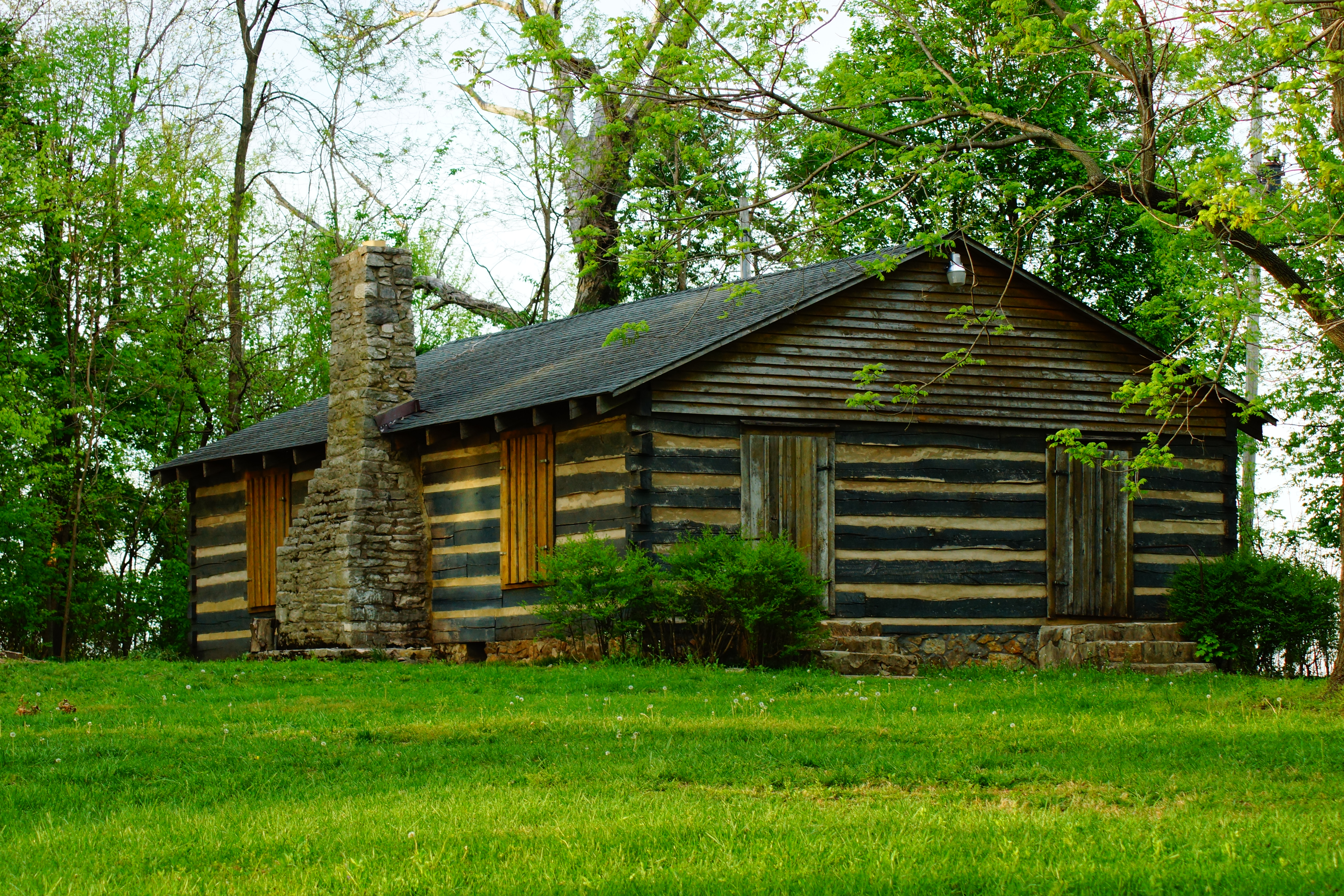
Reconstructed Red River Meeting House, 2014

In June 1800, McGready was joined at Red River by several area Presbyterian ministers, including William Hodge, John Rankin (whom McGready had recently appointed as minister of the Gasper River congregation), and the brothers William and John McGee. The latter was a Methodist minister who, some years later, wrote his account for the Methodist Missionary Magazine.

His narrative vividly described the revival's beginnings: "All was silent until Monday, the last day of the feast. … While Mr. Hodge was preaching, a woman in the East end got an uncommon blessing, broke through order, and shouted for some time and then sat down in silence." McGee continued, relating that most of the ministers were already gathered outside the meeting house while the people remained seated inside, unwilling to leave, when his brother, William, "felt such a power come on him that he quit his seat and sat down in the floor of the pulpit." John McGee began to tremble as weeping erupted through the congregation. The woman in the east end began to shout again and McGee started toward her just as someone reminded him that his Presbyterian hosts were "much for order" and would not "hear this confusion; go back and be quiet." McGee turned to go back and was "near falling" when he changed his mind and "went through the house shouting and exhorting with all possible ecstasy and energy." Using the term "slain", that came to be associated with the revival phenomenon of collapsing in a state of physical helplessness, McGee continued: "The floor was soon covered with the slain; their screams for mercy pierced the heavens."

=== First camp meetings in Kentucky ===
The religious excitement at Red River inspired what would later become a regular feature of Kentucky revivalism—camping at the site. In July 1800, the first camp meeting of the Second Great Awakening took place near the Gasper River. Previous to 1800, long-distance travelers attending the multi-day sacrament observance would make arrangements to stay with neighboring families, but as the news of the revivals spread, the combination of the people's desire to linger, and the practicalities associated with the needs of large numbers of people from great distances, inspired families to come prepared to camp at the site. McGready realized the potential for the innovation when protracted meetings continued into the night, and one family at Red River came ready to camp for the duration.

He began to publicize the idea of camping on the grounds for the next sacrament observance, to be held the following month at Gasper River. People responded and came on several wagons loaded with provisions and ready to camp for the July observance. By the time the meetings took place at the congregations of Muddy River and at several other congregations in Tennessee and Kentucky in the late summer and fall of 1800, camping had become common. The numbers attending, and those converted, had continued to grow, as did the number of ministers who preached and directed the sacrament observances. John McGee reported that most were Presbyterians and Methodists. Baptists were "generally opposed to the work," but a few of their pastors also joined the revivals.

=== The revival expands: McGready's account ===
Writing in 1801, McGready characterized the revivals of the previous summer and fall as "the most glorious time that our guilty eyes have ever beheld." Less narrative and descriptive than McGee's, McGready's accounts focused on the chronological unfolding of events. McGready's Calvinist beliefs prevented him from pronouncing with certainty that a person had been converted; he believed that only God knew for sure, but he made attempts, judging by the evidence at hand, to count the conversions that began in the summer sacraments of 1800. The numbers showed an accumulating and broadening effect: In June at Red River, ten were converted; in July at Gasper River, 45, as well as some Tennessee youths who returned home and encouraged the experience of "real religion" among twenty of their friends and neighbors. The Gasper River event hosted people from as distant as one hundred miles away. Thirteen wagons were employed to transport people and supplies, and the excitement was so great that some stayed at the meeting house through the night. In early August, on a Sunday church service at Red River, several black people and children were affected. Later that month, twenty-two wagons arrived at the Muddy River sacrament, and more than fifty persons converted throughout the multi-day observance.

The revival meetings continued throughout the fall with similar and escalating response among the people. Minister and Logan County predecessor, Dr. Thomas Craighead, when the meetings were held at The Ridge, a Tennessee congregation where over fifty were converted, including two of Craighead's children. Attendance at the various meetings continued to grow, with five thousand reported at Hodge's Shiloh congregation in Tennessee in September. The pace became demanding as McGready criss-crossed Kentucky and Tennessee, rushing from one sacrament to the other before the onset of winter. McGready exulted in the revival at one community, a hundred miles from Logan County at the Red Banks of the Ohio River (Henderson, Kentucky) where "professed Deists" became "warm and lively Christians." Poor accommodations and wet weather did not slow the pace in October, at Clay Lick, described by McGready as a small congregation with only a small cabin for a meeting house. There "eighty souls brought to Jesus." John Rankin carried the revival into eastern Tennessee and North Carolina in the fall of 1800, as the radius increasingly expanded outward from Logan County. McGready recorded several incidents of people inspiring their friends and neighbors after they had returned home, planting "true religion" in "careless and profane settlements where no professors lived." Although his account was not published until 1803, there is evidence from others, including Francis Asbury, that McGready's written testimony circulated much earlier.

== 1801: other accounts ==
=== Francis Asbury ===
By January 1801, Asbury was reading the accounts of the Logan County and Cumberland area revivals to Methodist congregations on his circuit, and writing about them to Stith Meade, a fellow Methodist itinerant presiding over the Georgia district. As he rode through North and South Carolina, Asbury relayed McGready's account of the revivals, kindling the hope among his fellow Methodists that similar outpourings might occur among them. Asbury had encountered the Cumberland area revivals in October 1800. Battling discouragement because of the lethargy of religious interest he had seen, he was traveling westward through Kentucky from the Bluegrass area. He turned south before reaching Logan County and headed toward Nashville; his journal reflected his mood on Thursday, Oct. 16, 1800: "In travelling nearly six hundred measured miles, we have had only six appointments; and at these but small congregations: we have wearied ourselves in vain!."

By Sunday, after he had reached Tennessee, his mood had changed. He spent the day among many of the revival ministers—Hodge, Rankin, the McGee brothers and Thomas Craighead—as well as a thousand worshippers, many camping on the grounds of the meeting house. By Tuesday, his journal reflected the scene in pastoral language, noting that a stand had been erected, "embosomed in a wood of lofty beech trees. The ministers of God, Methodists and Presbyterians, united their labors and mingled with the childlike simplicity of primitive times." Asbury echoed McGready's account of the meetings and activities extending into the night as he wrote of "fires blazing here and there [that] dispelled the darkness" as "the shouts of the redeemed captives, and the cries of the precious souls struggling into life broke the silence of midnight."

As they moved about the country, Asbury and his fellow Methodists employed many of the innovations which he had seen in the Cumberland area revivals. In March 1802, a camp meeting was organized in Mecklenburg, North Carolina, with about five thousand in attendance. The now familiar scenes of the Kentucky and Tennessee revivals were repeated here" "on Saturday and Sunday several hundred in the congregation fell to the ground and felt they had received pardon." By May 1802, a revival officiated by three Methodists, four Baptists, and eleven Presbyterians was held in the Waxhaw region of South Carolina, where thousands attended. The revivals continued through the Carolinas and by January 1803, Asbury had recorded 3,371 people added to the Methodist rolls.

=== Peter Cartwright ===
Peter Cartwright's family had moved to Logan County in 1793, when he was eight years old. In his autobiography, first published in 1856, he famously described Logan County as "Rogue's Harbor," a haven for criminals who had fled to the frontier to escape justice in the East. At fifteen, Cartwright, who characterized himself as a "wild and wicked boy" fond of horseracing, gambling, and dancing, attended a sacrament occasion in May 1801 and experienced conversion. His family's home in present-day Adairville, Kentucky, was three miles south of McGready's Red River Meeting House. Cartwright's Methodist family had come to hear a popular Methodist preacher, one of the ministers assisting McGready. Cartwright's description of the events indicate that the nascent camp meeting begun there the year before had evolved to a large, organized event: "The officers of the church erected a stand in a contiguous shady grove and prepared seats for a large congregation. The people crowded to this meeting from far and near. They came in their large wagons with victuals mostly prepared." The so-called, "falling" behavior had come to characterize the revivals, as Cartwright reported that "Scores of sinners fell ...like men slain in mighty battle; Christians shouted for joy."

=== Barton Stone and Cane Ridge ===
By the winter of 1800, sporadic revivals had begun to erupt in the Bluegrass region, near Lexington, even among the Baptists who could boast neither large meetings, nor extreme "bodily exercises"—the variety of seemingly uncontrollable outbursts and physical movements that increasingly accompanied the revivals. Barton Stone, who had been ministering, since 1796, at two Presbyterian congregations in the Bluegrass—Cane Ridge and Concord—traveled to Logan County in the spring of 1801 to see the revivals he had heard about. When Stone returned from the May 1801 Gasper River sacrament, he discovered that even telling the story of the Logan County revivals elicited some of the bodily exercises he had seen there. People wept and swooned in the church services and a leader in the Cane Ridge community was converted in a home where Stone reported the events of the revival.

The Cane Ridge congregation urged Stone to organize a similar event there and in August 1801 the observance there dwarfed those of Logan County, with as many as 20,000 in attendance. Similar observances in the area also sprang up, attracting large crowds, to bring the total number of revival attendees to 100,000 by the end of the year. The instances of so-called "bodily exercises" became more widespread and dramatic. Among the other manifestations of revival fervor, people increasingly exhibited "the jerks"—convulsive or rhythmical motions of the body that continued involuntarily despite attempts to calm them. The noise of the revival could be heard for miles, with many among the throng coming as observers of the spectacle rather than as participants. Because of its size, religious enthusiasm, and widespread national reporting, Cane Ridge came to epitomize the way people understood the Kentucky revivals. But the revivals also continued in the Cumberland region in 1801, increasing in both number and fervor.

== Distinguishing characteristics of the revivals ==
=== The phenomenon of bodily exercises ===
At the same time, ministers at Cane Ridge and others began to express significant reservations skeptical of the scope and prevalence of the bodily exercises, especially in regard to the suspicion that some of the ministers encouraged them, or declared people converted because of them. Presbyterian Richard McNemar was especially indicted as encouraging physical enthusiasm, but Stone was also criticized for making no effort to bring order to the increasingly wild behavior of both worshippers and ministers. Similar criticisms had arisen in Logan County the year before, but the growing success of the revivals had served to drown them out. By 1801, the critics were growing louder again, led by James Balch and Thomas Craighead. Though the revivals continued to attract crowds, opposition to them was significant enough that one Sunday, McGready had to preach from the steps of his Red River meeting house, having been locked out by an anti-revivalist church member.

McGready addressed the controversy by defending the exercises in 1801, using examples from the Bible and the writings of Jonathan Edwards, who had encountered a similar controversy during the revivals of the "awakenings" in the 1730s and 1740s. McGready explained the falling, shrieking, and crying for mercy as responses by the people to the realization of the depth of their sins and the coming of God's judgment. Loosely quoting Edwards's Sinners in the Hands of an Angry God, he described sinners' realization that they hung from a "brittle thread of life" over the "devouring flames" of hell. Under such an impression, McGready reasoned, it was no wonder a person cried for mercy or lost his strength.

Though McGready did not address directly one of the most controversial of the bodily exercises, convulsive movements called "the jerks," he did address leaping and dancing, which were sometimes included under the term because all such movements were understood to be involuntary. McGready likened these to biblical examples of people leaping for joy, but at the same time, said that these movements were not orchestrated or integrated as part of the worship service. McGready allowed for, but did not appear to encourage, the exercises. Nor did he assume that they were necessarily signs of conversion. His account reveals that he was most impressed by what he regarded as the extraordinary ability of children to exhort as a result of their conversions.

=== Ecumenism and egalitarianism ===
Denominational cooperation, a hallmark of the revivals that began in Logan County, was not necessarily uncommon among frontier preachers, because of the needs related to planting new churches and religious societies in the demanding circumstances of backcountry settlements. However, doctrinal differences between the sects were substantial and often produced suspicion and competition, preventing ministers from the different churches from collaborating, especially in theologically controversial realms such as the means of conversion and baptism, and the observance of the Lord's Supper. Baptists distinguished themselves apart from Methodists and Presbyterians because of differences over baptism. Presbyterians differed sharply from Methodists because of Calvinist doctrines of universal depravity and predestination, which contrasted with Methodists' emphasis on free will and universal, rather than limited, atonement. Revival preachers such as McGready circumvented many of the doctrinal controversies during the revivals by stressing the common belief in the necessity of an experience of "saving change."

Egalitarian practices in evangelical religion also advanced during the revivals, as McGready repeatedly mentioned the presence and conversion of blacks in the revivals and the expansion of the role of exhorter to women, children, and blacks, many of whom were enslaved. An exhorter was a lay person who preached an informal or impromptu sermon, encouraging others toward experiential conversion, often immediately after his own conversion. McGready was especially impressed with recurring instances of child exhorters who sometimes exhibited the falling behavior, only to rise later and expound upon the mysteries of the gospel in words that seemed beyond their years. He reported that "the conduct of young converts, and especially of such as were but children, fastened more convictions at these times than all the preaching." McGready accepted children as young as eight in the sacrament based on their conversion experiences, rather than satisfactory answers to questions based on the catechism, one of the usual requirements for participating in communion. McGready repeated throughout his account the universal character of the revivals' effects on all kinds of people—young and old, male and female, children and slaves. He also expressed his approval of revival attendees who organized their own religious societies, noting several instances of people who attended the meetings and returned home to tell their neighbors and begin meeting house-to-house without the oversight of a minister.

=== Sermons and theology ===
McGready's sermons were prepared in advance and followed a consistent pattern" they began with an introduction of the text, three or four points explicating it, and a conclusion. Because they were memorized and enlarged upon during the preaching, many in his audiences may have been unaware that he had written the sermons in advance. McGready's delivery was provocative and penetrating. Barton Stone said that "his coarse, tremulous voice excited in me the idea of something unearthly. His gestures were…the perfect reverse of elegance. Everything appeared by him forgotten, but the salvation of souls." McGready's preaching was "enforced by the joys of heaven and the miseries of hell.

While McGready's supporters called him a "Son of Thunder," gifted in "close and practical preaching," his enemies accused him of "undue severity." His sermons reveal the polarities of his preaching—sin and godliness, heaven and hell, salvation and judgment, truth and error—with titles such as, "The Sinner's Guide to Hell," "The Doom of the Impenitent," "The Believer Embracing Christ," and "The Danger of Rejecting the Means of Salvation." While McGready's sermons were not subtle or scholarly, they did reveal some marks of sophistication, including a grasp of history, an organized flow based on logical argument, and a theology derived from John Calvin and St. Augustine.

The influence of Jonathan Edwards appeared both in McGready's theology and in the language he used in his sermons. He was ecumenical in his invitation to Methodists and others to assist him in revivals, although he disagreed with them on theological matters. McGready was an unapologetic Calvinist. He believed that only the irresistible grace of God could enable the faith necessary for conversion, and that sinful man was devoid of the capacity to effect, or choose his own salvation. McGready believed he was acting on a solemn charge to shine the light of truth on man's desperate spiritual condition, that judgment awaited, and was possibly imminent: "The ungodly and finally impenitent will now be ripe for destruction…they shall reap a harvest of immortal woe…. This is, indeed, the solemn, dreadful harvest day; the tares are separated from the wheat, and… cast into everlasting fire." Conversion, then, was not a mere moral readjustment, but a cataclysmic recreation of a spirit corrupted by sin. In this context, McGready, like Edwards, believed that dramatic conversion experiences that caused people to swoon or cry out were the physical manifestation of unseen spiritual activity. McGready's focus on the need of the people for regeneration was not reserved for overt sinners, but also for church members who relied on exhibiting a moral life and knowledge of the Westminster catechism, but had not experienced a saving change. To McGready, all such people were in need of conversion. He regarded the participation in the sacrament without evidence of heart-felt regeneration as a serious hypocrisy, telling his congregation that "an unworthy communicant …is more offensive to Almighty God than a loathsome carcass crawling with vermin."

Aside from his primary concern for the conversion of individuals, McGready also expressed an urgency to battle popular philosophies and religious doctrines that had advanced in connection with the rhetoric of the American Revolution, especially deism. In opposition to the Calvinist doctrines regarding atonement, election, and irresistible grace, Deism proposed that man could save himself and society through reason and scientific advances. Further, McGready believed that deism denied the supernatural aspects of the Bible and its preeminence as "the strongest bond of civil government." Other ministers shared his concerns. By 1795, Thomas Paine's Age of Reason had been serialized in the Lexington Gazette, and was read widely. In 1798 a Presbyterian minister in the Bluegrass had complained that because many, especially among the youth, had "imbibed" these "writings of Infidels ...Infidelity...was desolating the land in respect to religion and morals." McGready believed that deism and ignorance about the Bible were synonymous: "Many of our poor, unhappy youth …must call themselves Deists, when they do not know a sentence in the Bible."

=== Hymnody ===
Hymn singing had been an important part of the sacrament season and continued to be a vital expression of religious feeling during the revivals. The familiarity of the songs encouraged participation and served as a vehicle for communal and devotional expression. McGready's fondness for, and use of, hymns is evidenced in the many instances of popular hymns quoted in his sermons. It was also one of many points of contention between him and anti-revivalist ministers, who preferred the more traditional "Rouse Psalms" associated with Scottish Presbyterianism since the seventeenth century. "Rouse Psalms," a close translation of the biblical Psalms from Hebrew, were the pride of early Reformers because of their accuracy to the original text, but were criticized by writers such as Isaac Watts and his contemporaries for their awkward phrasing and Old Testament imagery that lacked relevancy to the contemporary Christian. Watts "Christianized" the Psalms of David in his hymns, preferring to express the psalmist's themes rather than to make a close translation of his words.

In the late eighteenth and early nineteenth century, hymnals contained only words, not musical notations, and were designed to be sung to a variety of tunes well known among the congregations. Hymnals were among the most popular books owned and memorized by the common people. By 1800, nearly one hundred years after their first publication in England in 1707, Watts' hymns were still rising in popularity, along with hymns written by Charles Wesley, John Newton, William Cowper and others. Popular hymnals such as the Olney Hymns, published in 1779, focused on narratives that emphasized familiar biblical references, the salvific power of the cross, and the joys of heaven, and often steered clear of theological controversies to focus on personal and emotional expressions of practical religious themes.

Watts' poems were designed with the singer in mind, and were highly sensory and personal. McGready's sermons reveal an overwhelming preference for Watts, although many others were quoted as well. The most common themes included the reality and nearness of sin, the joy of redemption, and the nearness of death combined with the hope of heaven. Watts purposefully avoided the exalted language favored by the poets of his day so that his hymns would be understandable and relatable to the "weakest souls." "The greatest part" Watts wrote, "are suited…to the most common affairs of Christians."

== Aftermath ==
As the revivals spread, so did the controversy associated with them, increasingly threatening the unity of Presbyterianism in the West. Though McGready had earlier claimed that fellow minister Thomas Craighead had supported the revivals, by 1801, he and other Presbyterian ministers, including Logan County minister, James Balch, who had opposed McGready as early as 1797, aligned against the revival party led by McGready, Hodge, McAdow, McGee and Rankin. Their complaints highlighted several controversies, including the use of hymns instead of the older Scottish Psalter, the practice of night assemblies and all-night meetings, toleration of emotional outbursts and physical exercises such as shouting and falling during the meetings, inclusion of ministers of other denominations in sacrament services, and the licensing of exhorters and itinerants without formal training.

The widening schism culminated eventually with the formation of a separate denomination, the Cumberland Presbyterians, named for the region associated with the revivals. The controversy grew hot at Cane Ridge in 1801 as the bodily exercises and general enthusiasm reached greater levels and grew more unruly. Conservative Presbyterians became skeptical and were concerned, among other things, about the number of people admitted to communion based only on ecstatic experiences.

== Epilogue ==
In 1800, James McGready stood at the juncture of two centuries, looking backward to the traditions of his spiritual fathers and forward to children of a new century in a young republic. The segment of the Second Great Awakening that arose from the concert of voices he led, stood in the shadow of the First, when republican ideals deferred to a king and revival fervor emanated primarily from the voices of preachers wearing clerical collars or holding seminary degrees. McGready witnessed both the fracturing and stagnation of Presbyterianism in Kentucky, as well as the flowering of new forms of religious expressions thriving at the grass roots, where Bible reading, hymn singing, camp meetings and revival preaching were primary expressions of religious piety and feeling, reflecting the doctrines of the new birth among the common people. Largely as a result of the revival, religion was less hierarchical and controlled than in the preceding century, as well as more democratic and diverse.

As the number of evangelicals increased across the state, social changes in Kentucky were tangible as rationalism and deism, once perceived as threats by evangelicals, shrunk in public esteem. The egalitarian sentiment that found expression during the revivals translated to an increase in the number of evangelicals who opposed slavery. The Cane Ridge congregation, for example, presented a strong anti-slavery petition to the Kentucky Presbytery, while other social concerns such as temperance initiatives and legislation regarding the Sabbath were also introduced in the wake of the revivals.

The directions and destinations of the principal actors during the Revivals that spanned 1800-1801 were as varied as the evangelical expressions they fostered. Barton Stone, who had long harbored doubts about the doctrine of election, left the Presbyterians in 1804 and led a group calling themselves simply, "Christians." He later joined the Disciples of Christ, a group begun by Alexander Campbell. In 1810, the Cumberland Presbyterian Church was established by several pro-revival Presbyterian ministers. By 1820, the new denomination had twice as many congregations in the Cumberland region as the original Presbyterians. It rejected many Calvinist doctrines and discontinued exclusivity measures in the observance of communion, while continuing to affirm the practice of circuit riding and camp meetings.

Not surprisingly, Presbyterian membership suffered from the loss of many of its members to other denominations. Its numbers stagnated in the years between 1800 and 1820, while Baptist and Methodist membership soared to as much as tenfold from the time of the inception of the Logan County revivals, outpacing the rate of population generally. By the end of 1801 alone, the Baptists were already boasting a tripling of their members But as some groups and traditions grew, others diminished; by 1830, Presbyterian Scots-Irish sacrament observances had largely become a thing of the past, even as Baptist association meetings and Methodist camp meetings proliferated through the nineteenth century.

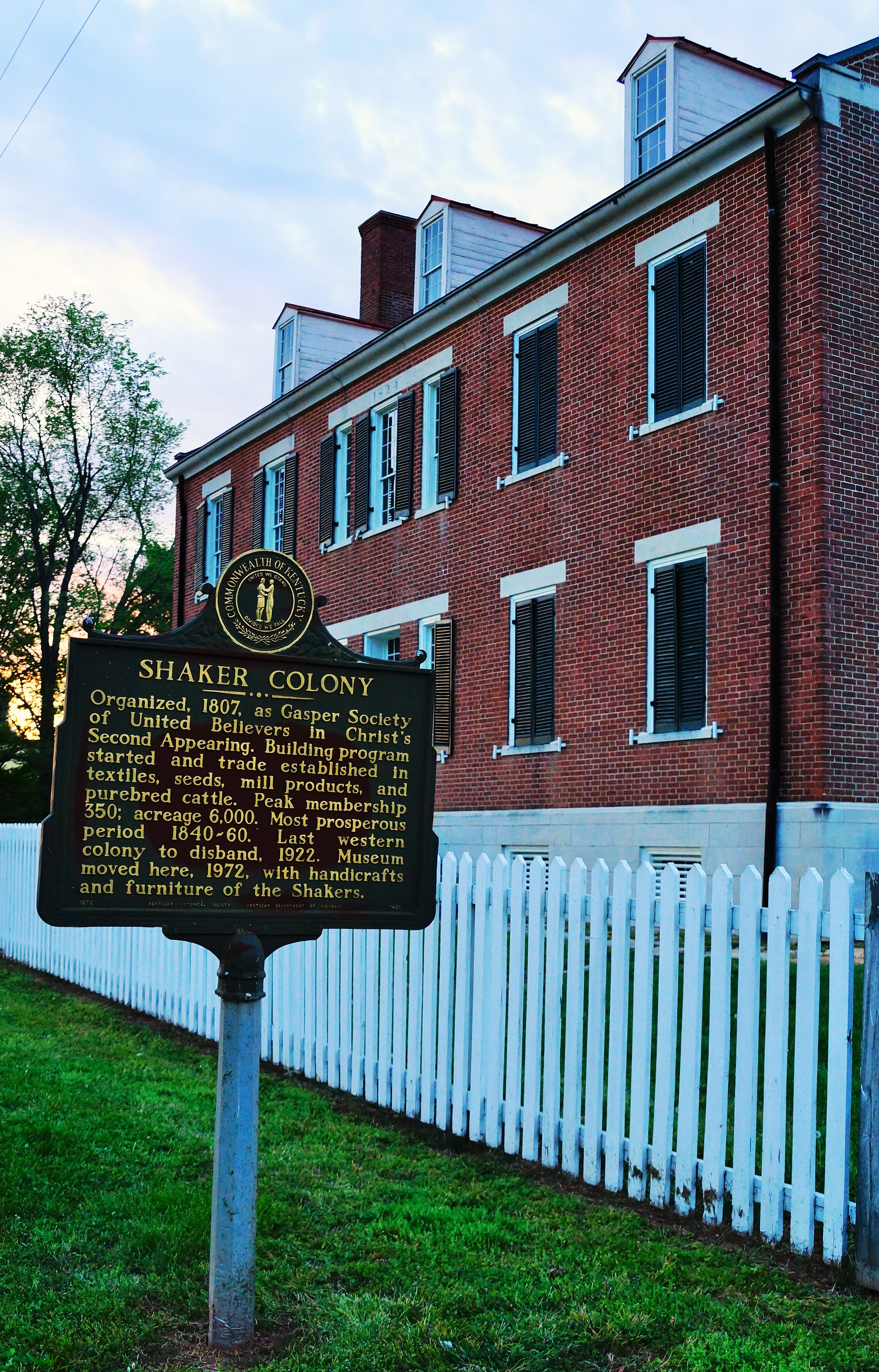
Shaker dwelling at South Union, Logan County, 2014

In Logan County, the revival peaked in 1801, but waned by degrees thereafter as each of McGready's three original congregations faced challenges by anti-revivalists. The Red River congregation eventually became affiliated with the Cumberland Presbyterians and the Muddy River congregation split, with the revivalist faction forming a new church called Liberty. John Rankin and several members of his Gasper River congregation joined the Shaker community at South Union, Kentucky, in 1808. Other revival ministers, Samuel McAdow and William McGee became Cumberland Presbyterian ministers. William Hodge remained a Presbyterian minister and Thomas Craighead was eventually expelled from the ministry for his rationalist beliefs.

In 1802, the year after his conversion in Logan County, Peter Cartwright's family moved farther west in Kentucky, and he was licensed as a Methodist exhorter and circuit rider in the newly formed circuit there. In the years that followed, Cartwright became a popular Methodist minister and revivalist, holding camp meetings throughout Kentucky, Tennessee, Indiana, Ohio and Illinois. He continued preaching and farming but eventually added political office to his resume, defeating Abraham Lincoln in 1832 for a seat in the Illinois legislature. Francis Asbury subsequently employed and enlarged upon many of the elements he encountered in the revivals of 1800 and 1801. Camp meetings became a mainstay of Methodism throughout the nineteenth century, helping to flood Methodist congregations with new members.

Though entreated by his revival colleagues to join the Cumberland Presbyterian ministry, James McGready chose to stay among the Presbyterians, accepting temporary censure by a committee of the Transylvania Presbytery in 1805, along with other revival preachers, for his association with controversial revival practices and doctrines. He was restored as a credentialed Presbyterian minister in 1806. He left Logan County in 1807 and moved to Henderson, Kentucky, to minister to a congregation he had pioneered during the 1800 revivals. He died there in 1817.
