= Craighead House =

Craighead House may refer to:

in Canada

- Craighead House, Vancouver, British Columbia, designed by Charles Edward Pratt

in New Zealand

- Craighead, Timaru, the heritage-registered administration building of Craighead Diocesan School

in the United States

- Craighead–Jackson House, Knoxville, Tennessee, NRHP-listed
- Craighead House (Nashville, Tennessee), historic house with notable gardens
