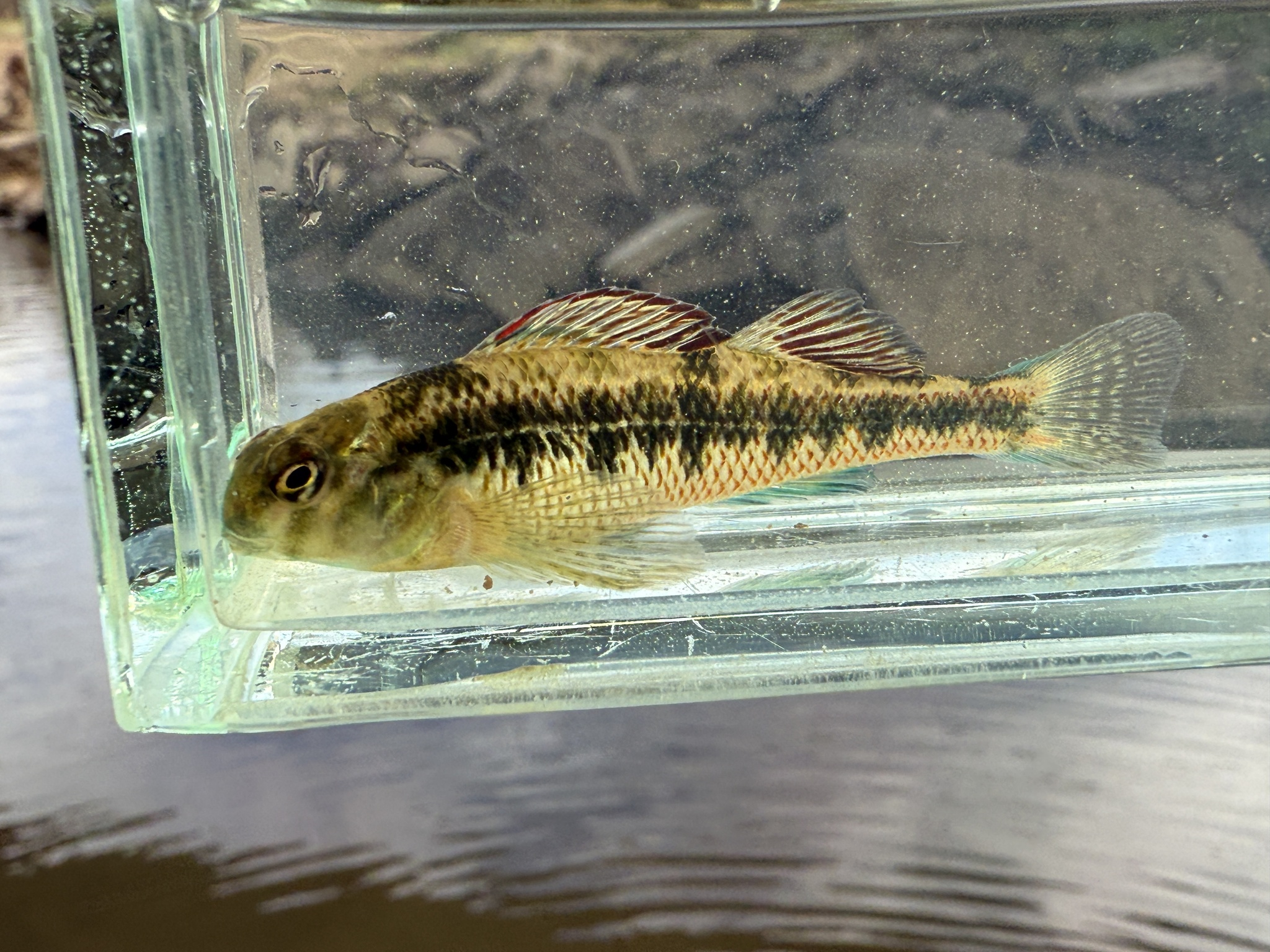
- Etheostoma rafinesquei

Conservation status
- Least Concern (IUCN 3.1)

Scientific classification
- Kingdom: Animalia
- Phylum: Chordata
- Class: Actinopterygii
- Order: Perciformes
- Family: Percidae
- Genus: Etheostoma
- Species: E. rafinesquei

Binomial name
- Etheostoma rafinesquei Burr & Page, 1982

= Kentucky darter =

Species of fish

The Kentucky darter (Etheostoma rafinesquei) is a species of freshwater ray-finned fish, a darter from the subfamily Etheostomatinae, part of the family Percidae, which also contains the perches, ruffes and pikeperches. It is endemic to the eastern United States, where it occurs in the upper Green and Gasper River systems in Kentucky. It inhabits rocky pools and adjacent riffles of creeks and small rivers. It has a diet that mainly consists of mayflies, larval blackflies, midges and occasionally various insect larvae. This species can reach a length of 6.5 cm (2.6 in).

The Kentucky darter was first formally described in 1982 by Lawrence M. Page and Brooks Burr with the type locality being given as Barren Run, tributary of The North Fork of the Nolin River, 2 kilometers northwest of town of Barren Run, Kentucky. The specific name honours the French naturalist Constantine Samuel Rafinesque (1783–1840) who was Professor of Botany and Natural History at Transylvania University in Lexington, Kentucky and described many species of fish from Kentucky.
