= Red River Meeting House =

Historic site in Logan County, Kentucky, US

- Red River Presbyterian Meetinghouse Site and Cemetery
- U.S. National Register of Historic Places
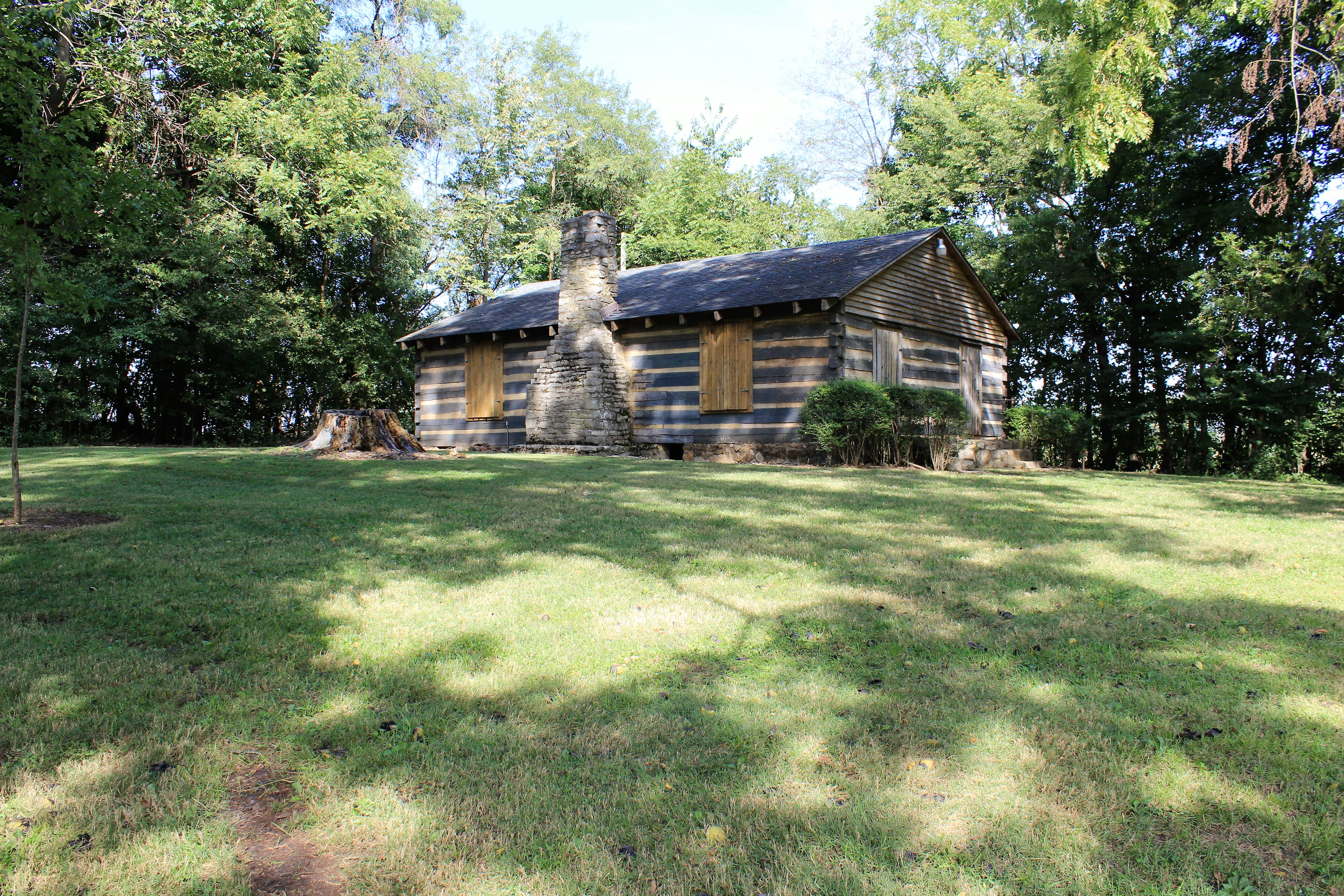

- Location within Kentucky Location within the United States
- Nearest city: Adairville, Kentucky
- Coordinates: 36°43′16″N 86°48′53″W
- Area: 3.5 acres (1.4 ha)
- Built: 1800
- NRHP reference No.: 76000917
- Added to NRHP: June 18, 1976

The Red River Meeting House was the site of the first religious camp meeting in the United States. Held June 13–17, 1800, it marked the start of the Second Great Awakening, a major religious movement in the United States in the first part of the nineteenth century. The meeting was organized by the Presbyterian minister James McGready (also spelled M'Gready) in Logan County, Kentucky, and several preachers took part.

== First camp meeting ==
What later became known as the Revival of 1800 began as a traditional Presbyterian sacramental occasion at the Red River Meeting House in June of the same year. As the revival spread to the congregations of McGready's two other area congregations, several hundred people attended the meetings, held from Friday through Tuesday. McGready's other congregations were located at Muddy River, and Gasper River. The meeting was a chance for the settlers to end their relative isolation for several days and to engage with new people.

A letter from McGready to a friend dated October 23, 1801, described the meeting.

In June, the sacrament was administered at Red River. This was the greatest time we had ever seen before. On Monday multitudes were struck down under awful conviction; the cries of the distressed filled the whole house. There you might see profane swearers, and sabbath breakers pricked to the heart, and crying out, "what shall we do to be saved?" There frolicers, and dancers crying for mercy. There you might see little children of ten, eleven and twelve years of age, praying and crying for redemption, in the blood of Jesus, in agonies of distress. During this sacrament, and until the Tuesday following, ten persons we believe, were savingly brought home to Christ.

The Presbyterian minister Barton W. Stone observed the events and wrote the following:

There, on the edge of a prairie in Logan County, Kentucky, the multitudes came together and continued a number of days and nights encamped on the ground, during which time worship was carried on in some part of the encampment. The scene was new to me and passing strange. It baffled description. Many, very many, fell down as men slain in battle, and continued for hours together in an apparently breathless and motionless state, sometimes for a few moments reviving and exhibiting symptoms of life by a deep groan or piercing shriek, or by a prayer for mercy fervently uttered. After lying there for hours they obtained deliverance. The gloomy cloud that had covered their faces seemed gradually and visibly to disappear, and hope, in smiles, brightened into joy. They would rise, shouting deliverance, and then would address the surrounding multitude in language truly eloquent and impressive. With astonishment did I hear men, women, and children declaring the wonderful works of God and the glorious mysteries of the gospel. Their appeals were solemn, heart-penetrating, bold, and free. Under such circumstances many others would fall down into the same state from which the speakers had just been delivered.

The historian Paul Conkin downplays the significance of the Red River meeting in relation to the religious revival. He says that McGready was one of several preachers at the event. The preacher wrote an account that was widely circulated, and which was instrumental in forming people's perceptions of the events at the meeting. Conkin thinks that McGready's account was exaggerated.

== History ==
The first settlers of European descent in the area were Ambrose Maulding and his family in 1780. They established what became known as Maulding's Station or Maulding's Fort. The original church building in this area was built between 1789 and 1792 and is described by some as the first Cumberland Presbyterian Church. After the church building collapsed in 1856, the adjacent cemetery expanded onto the site of the original cabin.

A white framed church was built nearby but was torn down in 1929 due to deterioration and disuse. A log cabin believed to resemble the original style was constructed on the site in 1959. It burned due to an unknown cause on May 2, 1992. The Red River Meeting House and Cemetery Association was formed to raise funds for a replacement pioneer church, which was constructed in May 1994.

Kentucky Historical Marker 71 is erected at the intersection of U.S. Highway 431 and Route 663: "Three miles east is site of early pioneer church. Organized by 'A Society of Presbyterians,' 1789. Here the Great Revival of 1800 was conducted by the Rev. James McGready. First camp meeting held here."

The adjacent cemetery contains the graves of numerous veterans of the Revolutionary War and the War of 1812. The gravestone of William McPherson is engraved with the Twenty-third Psalm in Gaelic.

The site was added to the National Register of Historic Places in 1976.

== Location ==
The site is located three miles (5 km) east of U.S. Route 431 along Route 663 and the Red River in Logan County, Kentucky.

== Current use ==
A primitive camp meeting and rendezvous is held annually on the grounds during the local Tobacco & Heritage Festival (second weekend in October). The Red River Meeting House and Cemetery Association holds its annual meeting on the grounds on the second Sunday in September. The site is privately owned, but it is open to the public from dawn to dusk and admittance is free. There are no interpretive signs or facilities.

== See also ==
- Second Great Awakening
- Revival of 1800
