= Peter Cartwright (revivalist) =

American missionary and politician (1785–1872)

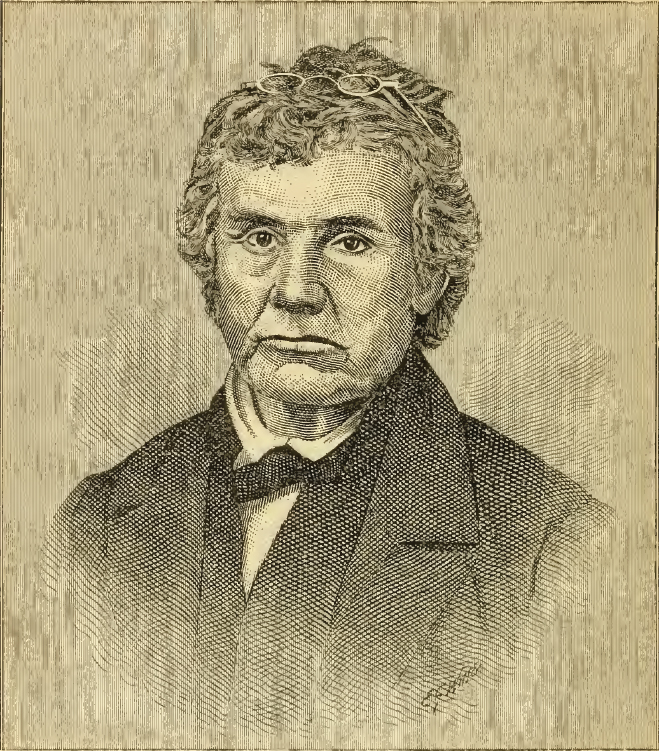
- Cartwright, as he appeared in the textbook A Youth's History of Kentucky for School and General Reading by Ed Porter Thompson, 1897
- Born: Peter Cartwright, Jr. September 1, 1785; Amherst County, Virginia, present-day Nelson County, Virginia
- Died: September 25, 1872 (aged 87); Pleasant Plains, Illinois
- Resting place: Pleasant Plains Cemetery
- Other names: Uncle Peter, Backwoods Preacher, Lord's Plowman, Lord's Breaking-Plow, The Kentucky Boy
- Occupations: Preacher; revivalist; military chaplain; author
- Known for: being a revivalist missionary, who helped start America's Second Great Awakening, personally baptizing twelve thousand converts and the author of Autobiography of Peter Cartwright: The Backwoods Preacher
- Spouse: Frances Gaines
- Parent(s): Peter Cartwright, Sr.

Peter Cartwright (born Peter Cartwright Jr., September 1, 1785 – September 25, 1872) was an American Methodist and revivalist preacher in the Midwest, as well as twice an elected legislator in Illinois. Cartwright, a Methodist missionary, helped start America's Second Great Awakening, personally baptizing twelve thousand converts. Opposed to slavery, Cartwright moved from Kentucky to Illinois, and was elected to the lower house of the Illinois General Assembly in 1828 and 1832. In 1846 Abraham Lincoln defeated Cartwright for a seat in the United States Congress. As a Methodist circuit rider, Cartwright rode circuits in Kentucky and Illinois, as well as Tennessee, Indiana and Ohio. His Autobiography (1856) made him nationally prominent.

== Early life ==
Peter Cartwright Jr., the son of Peter Cartwright Sr., and Christiana Garvin, was born in Amherst County, Virginia, present-day Nelson County, Virginia, between Findlay Mountain and Purgatory Swamp. Soon after his birth, Cartwright's family moved to what was then Kentucky County, now Logan County, Kentucky.

== Preacher ==
In 1801, as teenager, Cartwright was converted at a camp meeting in Kentucky associated with the Revival of 1800, a series of sacrament meetings conducted by Presbyterian James McGready and other Presbyterian and Methodist ministers. He subsequently joined the Methodist Episcopal Church. He became a preacher in 1802 and was ordained in 1806 by Francis Asbury and William McKendree. In 1812, Cartwright was appointed a presiding elder (now District Superintendent), and he served in that office for the next thirty-five years.

== Marriage and children ==
In 1808, Cartwright married Frances Gaines. Together they had two sons and seven daughters, one of whom, Cynthia, died on the journey to Illinois.

== Military service in War of 1812 ==
Cartwright served as a military chaplain during the War of 1812.

== Ministry ==
Cartwright called himself "God's Plowman." As a circuit rider, he explained in his Autobiography, "My district was four hundred miles long, and covered all the west side of the Grand Prairie, fully two-thirds of the geographical boundaries of the state."

After preaching in Kentucky, Tennessee, Ohio, and Indiana, he preached for almost half a century in Illinois, where he had settled in 1824. Cartwright was a founding member of the Illinois Annual Conference in 1824, and remained in Illinois for the rest of his life. He was a towering figure of frontier Methodism and one of the most colorful and energetic preachers Methodism has produced. During his five decades of ministry, he was elected to 13 General Conferences (1816 through 1856, missing only 1832).

Cartwright was charismatic; he pursued a divine calling, not a profession. His conversion of others to Methodism, rather than his own education, gained him admission to the ministry and verified his methods. His sermons were always extemporaneous, anecdotal, and participatory. He was a master of charismatic domination and used it effectively to create the ecstatic conversion required to be reborn. He opposed the routinization and institutionalization of religion and favored the more democratic, egalitarian, and associational form of the frontier circuits. Theologically he was an Arminian, and was convinced that all people could be saved, especially through the camp meeting revival.

In the Methodist church, the presiding elder oversaw the works of preachers and churches to which he was assigned, and was below the bishop in the denomination's chain of command. In the 19th-century presiding elders were the most important officers in the Methodist "army" that sought to "conquer the land for Christ." Cartwright, who served as a presiding elder for 50 years, demonstrated that the office was that of a sub-bishop who was not always popular with his subordinates. Cartwright was strong-willed in his office and was often accused of being dictatorial, but he eventually earned notoriety as the father of Illinois Methodism.

== Colleges ==
Cartwright had little formal education and was skeptical of its value at first, but reversed course and promoted Methodist education. He helped found McKendree College (Lebanon), Illinois Wesleyan University (Bloomington); and Illinois Conference Female Academy in Jacksonville (which became MacMurray College).

== Politics and anti-slavery views ==
Cartwright jumped into politics as a Democrat. In the 1832 election for what became his second term in the Illinois legislature, Cartwright was one of four candidates elected (in a field of thirteen including a Kentucky store clerk and rail splitter named Abraham Lincoln, who came in eighth). "I was beaten", Abraham Lincoln later wrote, "the only time I have even been beaten by the people." Cartwright had first met Lincoln in 1830, during his own unsuccessful run for governor. In 1846, the Springfield Whig, Lincoln, defeated Cartwright to represent the area in the United States Congress, some constituents being offended by Cartwright's mixing of religion and politics, others by his vehemence against alcohol.

Politically, Cartwright was a Jacksonian Democrat who trusted in the ability of the common man. Unlike Jackson, Cartwright opposed slavery. He advocated moral suasion to end it, fearing that political action would threaten the federal union, another core element of national identity. Cartwright also supported expansionism—both to spread American values and to increase economic opportunity. To him, manhood was demonstrated by singleness of purpose despite all obstacles and by economic independence.

Cartwright's hatred of slavery in Kentucky, and his failure to convince the slaveholders to free their slaves, led him to move to Illinois in 1824, where slavery was illegal.

In his Autobiography he said that in Illinois he,

would get entirely clear of the evil of slavery, that he could improve his financial situation and procure lands for my children as they grew up. And ... I could carry the Gospel to destitute souls that had, by their removal into some new country, been deprived of the means of grace.

== Autobiography ==
From his Autobiography of Peter Cartwright: The Backwoods Preacher, published in 1857, Cartwright described his conversion in his own words:

To this meeting I repaired, a guilty, wretched sinner. On the Saturday evening of said meeting, I went, with weeping multitudes, and bowed before the stand, and earnestly prayed for mercy. In the midst of a solemn struggle of soul, an impression was made on my mind, as though a voice said to me, "Thy sins are all forgiven thee." Divine light flashed all round me, unspeakable joy sprung up in my soul. I rose to my feet, opened my eyes, and it really seemed as if I was in heaven; the trees, the leaves on them, and everything seemed, and I really thought were, praising God. My mother raised the shout, my Christian friends crowded around me and joined me in praising God; and though I have been since then, in many instances, unfaithful, yet I have never, for one moment, doubted that the Lord did, then and there, forgive my sins and give me religion.

== Death ==
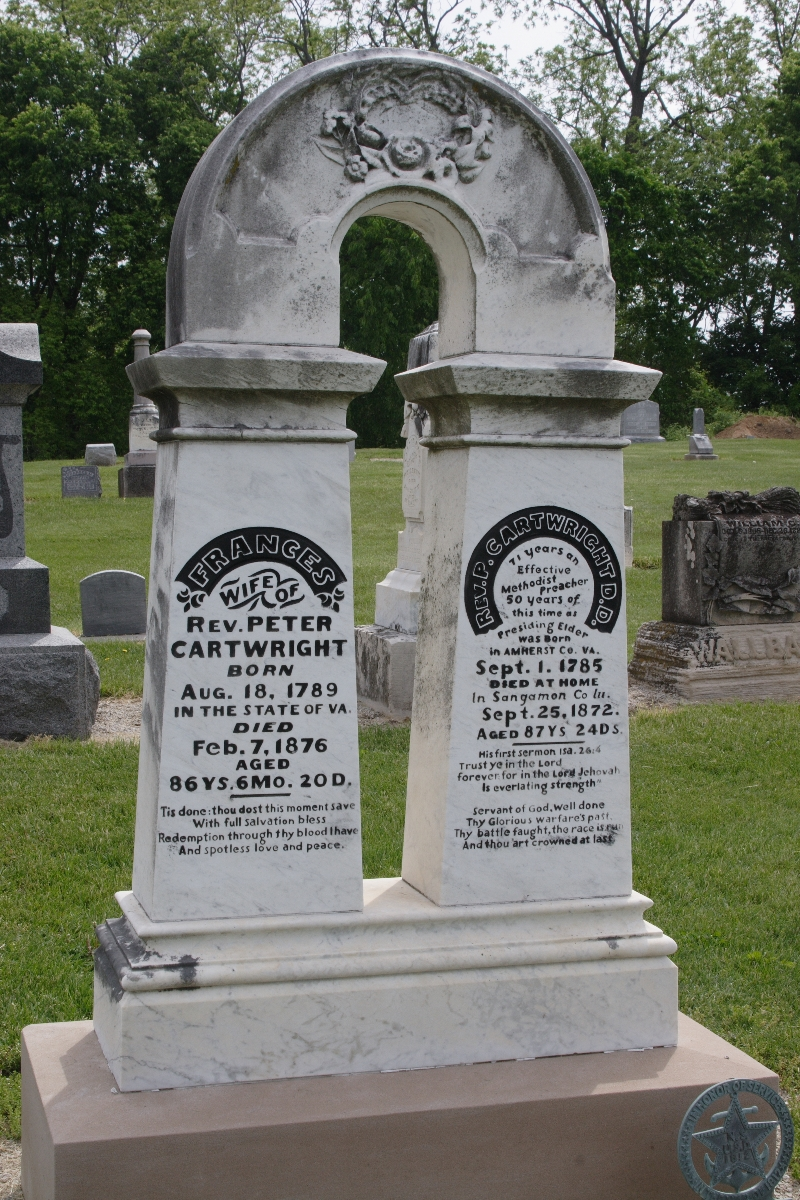
Cartwright's tombstone, in Pleasant Plains Cemetery, Pleasant Plains, Sangamon County, Illinois

Cartwright died, near Pleasant Plains, Sangamon County, Illinois, on September 25, 1872.

== Memory ==
A Virginia Historical marker honors Cartwright, near his birthplace. Kentucky's Adairville marks his boyhood home. An Illinois Historical marker honors Cartwright in Sangamon County, near his home and grave.

The present Cartwright Church began in 1824, as a class in the Cartwright home. In 1838, Cartwright donated land and $300 toward the construction of a log chapel where the congregation worshipped until 1853. By that time, the church had grown so much that it had to divide into two congregations. One moved two miles west and built the Bethel Methodist Episcopal Church (which was torn down in 1953). The other moved into the new village of Pleasant Plains, Illinois and constructed the current building in 1857. Two additions have been made, but the sanctuary is nearly the same as during Cartwright's time.
