= Second Great Awakening =

19th-century US religious revival

The Second Great Awakening was a religious revival during the late 18th and early 19th century in the United States. It spread religion through revivals and emotional preaching and sparked a number of schismatic movements. Revivals were not key to the movement and attracted hundreds of converts to new denominations. The Methodist Church used circuit riders to reach people in frontier locations.

The Second Great Awakening led to a period of antebellum social reform. The outpouring of religious fervor and revival began in Kentucky and Tennessee in the 1790s and early 1800s among the Presbyterians, Methodists, and Baptists. New religious movements emerged during the Second Great Awakening, such as Adventism, and Dispensationalism. The Second Great Awakening also led to the founding of several well-known colleges, seminaries, and mission societies.

Historians named the Second Great Awakening in the context of the First Great Awakening of the 1730s to 1750s and of the Third Great Awakening of the late 1850s to early 1900s. The First Awakening was part of a much larger evangelical religious movement that was sweeping across England, Scotland, and Germany.

== Spread of revivals ==
=== Background ===
The Second Great Awakening in North America rejected the skepticism, deism, Unitarianism, and rationalism left over from the American Enlightenment, about the same time that similar movements flourished in Europe. Pietism was sweeping Germanic countries and evangelicalism was waxing strong in England.

The Second Great Awakening occurred in several episodes and over different denominations; however, the revivals were very similar. As the most effective form of evangelizing during this period, revival meetings cut across geographical boundaries. The movement quickly spread throughout Kentucky, Indiana, Tennessee, and southern Ohio, as well as other regions of the United States and Canada. Each denomination had assets that allowed it to thrive on the frontier. The Methodists had an efficient organization that depended on itinerant ministers, known as circuit riders, who sought out people in remote frontier locations. The circuit riders came from among the common people, which helped them establish rapport with the frontier families they hoped to convert.

=== Theology ===
Postmillennialist theology dominated American Protestantism in the first half of the 19th century. Postmillennialists believed that Christ will return to earth after the "Millennium", which could entail either a literal 1,000 years or a figurative "long period" of peace and happiness. Christians thus had a duty to purify society in preparation for that return. This duty extended beyond American borders to include Christian Restorationism. George Fredrickson argues that Postmillennial theology "was an impetus to the promotion of Progressive reforms, as historians have frequently pointed out." During the Second Great Awakening of the 1830s, some diviners expected the Millennium to arrive in a few years. By the late 1840s, however, the great day had receded to the distant future, and postmillennialism became a more passive religious dimension of the wider middle-class pursuit of reform and progress.

=== Burned-over district ===
Beginning in the 1820s, Western New York State experienced a series of popular religious revivals that would later earn this region the nickname "the burned-over district," which implied the area was set ablaze with spiritual fervor. This term, however, was not used by contemporaries in the first half of the nineteenth century, as it originates from Charles Grandison Finney's Autobiography of Charles G Finney (1876), in which he writes, "I found that region of country what, in the western phrase, would be called, a 'burnt district.' There had been, a few years previously, a wild excitement passing through that region, which they called a revival of religion, but which turned out to be spurious." During this period, a number of nonconformist, folk religion, and evangelical sects flourished in the region.

The extent to which religious fervor actually affected the region was reassessed in last quarter of the twentieth century. Linda K. Pritchard used statistical data to show that compared to the rest of New York State, the Ohio River Valley in the lower Midwest, and the country as a whole, the religiosity of the Burned-over District was typical rather than exceptional. More recent works, however, have argued that these revivals in Western New York had a unique and lasting impact upon the religious and social life of the entire nation.

=== West and Tidewater South ===
On the American frontier, evangelical denominations, especially Methodists and Baptists, sent missionary preachers and exhorters to meet the people in the backcountry in an effort to support the growth of church membership and the formation of new congregations. Another key component of the revivalists' techniques was the camp meeting. These outdoor religious gatherings originated from field meetings and the Scottish Presbyterians' "Holy Fairs", which were brought to America in the mid-eighteenth century from Ireland, Scotland, and Britain's border counties. Most of the Scotch-Irish immigrants before the American Revolutionary War settled in the backcountry of Pennsylvania and down the spine of the Appalachian Mountains in present-day Maryland and Virginia, where Presbyterian emigrants and Baptists held large outdoor gatherings in the years prior to the war. The Presbyterians and Methodists sponsored similar gatherings on a regular basis after the Revolution.

The denominations that encouraged the revivals were based on an interpretation of man's spiritual equality before God, which led them to recruit members and preachers from a wide range of classes and all races. Baptists and Methodist revivals were successful in some parts of the Tidewater South, where an increasing number of common planters, plain folk, and slaves were converted.

=== West ===
In the newly settled frontier regions, the revival was implemented through camp meetings. These often provided the first encounter for some settlers with organized religion, and they were important as social venues. The camp meeting was a religious service of several days' length with preachers. Settlers in thinly populated areas gathered at the camp meeting for fellowship as well as worship. The sheer exhilaration of participating in a religious revival with crowds of hundreds and perhaps thousands of people inspired the dancing, shouting, and singing associated with these events. The revivals also followed an arc of great emotional power, with an emphasis on the individual's sins and need to turn to Christ, and a sense of restoring personal salvation. This differed from the Calvinists' belief in predestination as outlined in the Westminster Confession of Faith, which emphasized the inability of men to save themselves and decreed that the only way to be saved was by God's electing grace. Upon their return home, most converts joined or created small local churches, which grew rapidly.

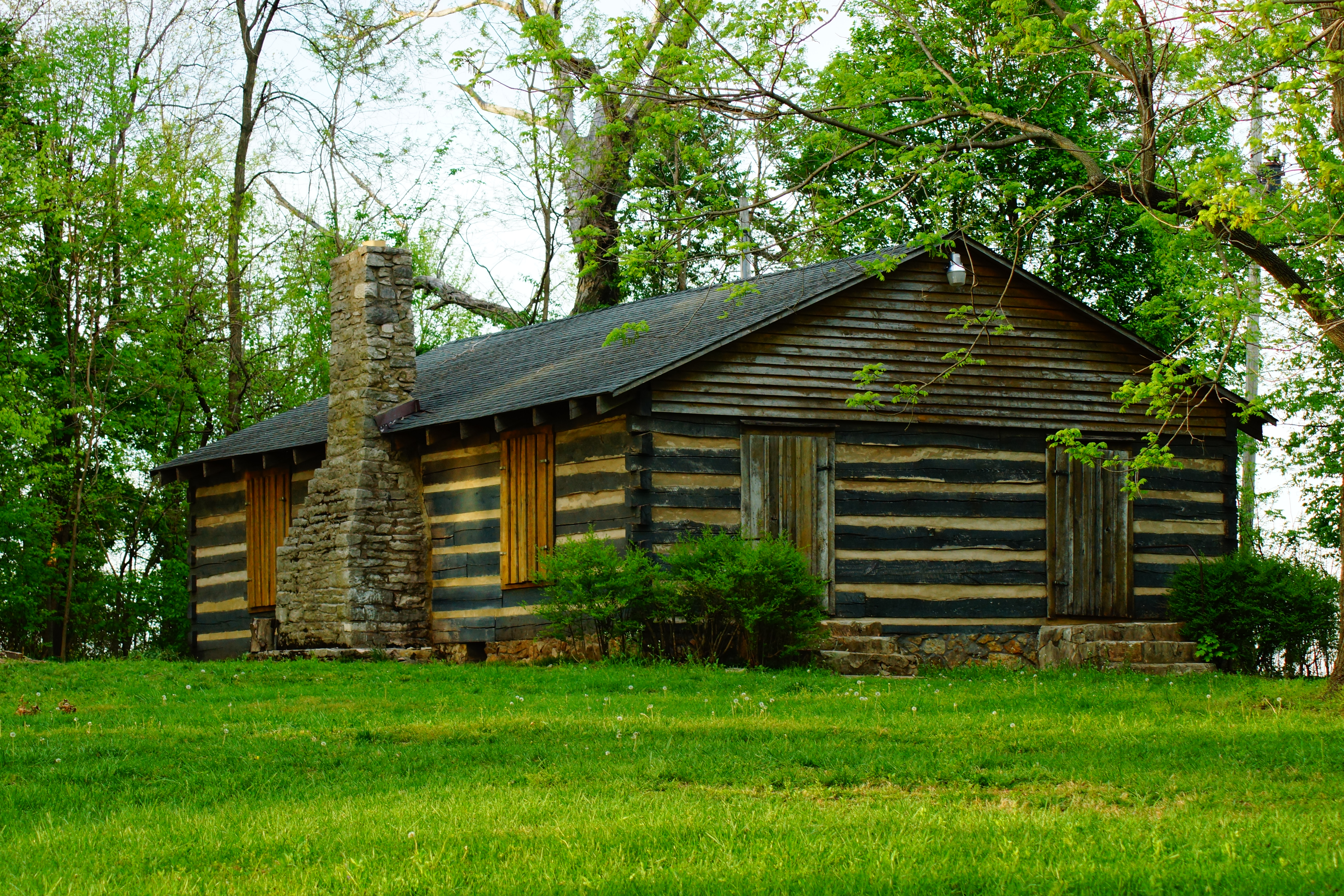
Red River Meeting House in 2014

The Revival of 1800 in Logan County, Kentucky, began as a traditional Presbyterian sacramental occasion. The first informal camp meeting began in June, when people began camping on the grounds of the Red River Meeting House. Subsequent meetings followed at the nearby Gasper River and Muddy River congregations. All three of these congregations were under the ministry of Presbyterian Reverend James McGready. A year later, in August 1801, an even larger sacrament occasion that is generally considered to be America's first camp meeting was held at Cane Ridge in Bourbon County, Kentucky, under Barton W. Stone (1772–1844) with numerous Presbyterian, Baptist, and Methodist ministers participating in the services. The six-day gathering attracting perhaps as many as 20,000 people, although the exact number of attendees was not formally recorded. Due to the efforts of such leaders as Stone and Alexander Campbell (1788–1866), the camp meeting revival spread religious enthusiasm and became a major mode of church expansion, especially for the Methodists and Baptists. Presbyterians and Methodists initially worked together to host the early camp meetings, but the Presbyterians eventually became less involved because of the noise and often raucous activities that occurred during the protracted sessions.

As a result of the Revival of 1800, the Cumberland Presbyterian Church was founded in 1810 near Dickson, Tennessee by the Revs: Samuel McAdow, Finis Ewing, and Samuel King and became a strong supporter of the revivalist movement. Cane Ridge was also instrumental in fostering what became known as the Restoration Movement, which consisted of non-denominational churches committed to what they viewed as the original, fundamental Christianity of the New Testament. Churches with roots in this movement include the Churches of Christ, Christian Church (Disciples of Christ), and the Evangelical Christian Church in Canada. The congregations of these denomination were committed to individuals' achieving a personal relationship with Christ.

=== Church membership soars ===
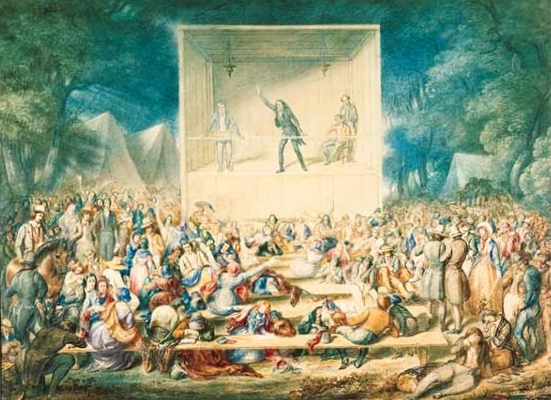
1839 Methodist camp meeting

The Methodist circuit riders and local Baptist preachers made enormous gains in increasing church membership. To a lesser extent the Presbyterians also gained members, particularly with the Cumberland Presbyterian Church in sparsely settled areas. As a result, the numerical strength of the Baptists and Methodists rose relative to that of the denominations dominant in the colonial period—the Anglicans, Presbyterians, Congregationalists. Among the new denominations that grew from the religious ferment of the Second Great Awakening are the Latter Day Saint movement, Restoration Movement, Jehovah's Witnesses, Churches of Christ, Christian Church (Disciples of Christ), the Seventh-day Adventist Church, and the Evangelical Christian Church in Canada.

The converts during the Second Great Awakening were predominantly female. A 1932 source estimated at least three female converts to every two male converts between 1798 and 1826. Young people (those under 25) also converted in greater numbers, and were the first to convert.

== New movements ==
=== Adventism ===
The Advent movement emerged in the 1830s and 1840s in North America, and was preached by ministers such as William Miller, whose followers became known as Millerites. The name refers to belief in the soon Second Advent of Jesus (popularly known as the Second Coming) and resulted in several major religious denominations, including Seventh-day Adventists, Advent Christians, and Jehovah's Witnesses.

=== Holiness movement ===
Though its roots are in the First Great Awakening and earlier, a re-emphasis on Wesleyan teachings on sanctification emerged during the Second Great Awakening, leading to a distinction between Mainline Methodism and Holiness churches.

=== Restoration Movement ===
The idea of restoring a "primitive" form of Christianity grew in popularity in the U.S. after the American Revolution. This desire to restore a purer form of Christianity without an elaborate hierarchy contributed to the development of many groups during the Second Great Awakening, including the Latter Day Saints and Shakers. Several factors made the restoration sentiment particularly appealing during this time period:

- To immigrants in the early 19th century, the land in the United States seemed pristine, edenic and undefiled – "the perfect place to recover pure, uncorrupted and original Christianity" – and the tradition-bound European churches seemed out of place in this new setting.
- A primitive faith based on the Bible alone promised a way to sidestep the competing claims of the many denominations available and for congregations to find assurance of being right without the security of an established national church.

The Restoration Movement began during, and was greatly influenced by, the Second Great Awakening. While the leaders of one of the two primary groups making up this movement, Thomas Campbell and Alexander Campbell, resisted what they saw as the spiritual manipulation of the camp meetings, the revivals contributed to the development of the other major branch, led by Barton W. Stone. The Southern phase of the Awakening "was an important matrix of Barton Stone's reform movement" and shaped the evangelistic techniques used by both Stone and the Campbells.

== Culture and society ==
Efforts to apply Christian teaching to the resolution of social problems presaged the Social Gospel of the late 19th century. Converts were taught that to achieve salvation they needed not just to repent personal sin but also work for the moral perfection of society, which meant eradicating sin in all its forms. Thus, evangelical converts were leading figures in a variety of 19th century reform movements.

Congregationalists set up missionary societies to evangelize the western territory of the northern tier. Members of these groups acted as apostles for the faith, and also as educators and exponents of northeastern urban culture. The Second Great Awakening served as an "organizing process" that created "a religious and educational infrastructure" across the western frontier that encompassed social networks, a religious journalism that provided mass communication, and church-related colleges. Publication and education societies promoted Christian education; most notable among them was the American Bible Society, founded in 1816. Women made up a large part of these voluntary societies. The Female Missionary Society and the Maternal Association, both active in Utica, NY, were highly organized and financially sophisticated women's organizations responsible for many of the evangelical converts of the New York frontier.

There were also societies that broadened their focus from traditional religious concerns to larger societal ones. These organizations were primarily sponsored by affluent women. They did not stem entirely from the Second Great Awakening, but the revivalist doctrine and the expectation that one's conversion would lead to personal action accelerated the role of women's social benevolence work. Social activism influenced abolition groups and supporters of the Temperance movement. They began efforts to reform prisons and care for the handicapped and mentally ill. They believed in the perfectibility of people and were highly moralistic in their endeavors.

== African Americans ==
Baptists and Methodists in the South preached to slaveholders and slaves alike. Conversions and congregations started with the First Great Awakening, resulting in Baptist and Methodist preachers being authorized among slaves and free African Americans more than a decade before 1800. "Black Harry" Hosier, an illiterate freedman who drove Francis Asbury on his circuits, proved to be able to memorize large passages of the Bible verbatim and became a cross-over success, as popular among white audiences as the black ones Asbury had originally intended for him to minister. His sermon at Thomas Chapel in Chapeltown, Delaware, in 1784 was the first to be delivered by a black preacher directly to a white congregation.

Despite being called the "greatest orator in America" by Benjamin Rush and one of the best in the world by Bishop Thomas Coke, Hosier was repeatedly passed over for ordination and permitted no vote during his attendance at the Christmas Conference that formally established American Methodism. Richard Allen, the other black attendee, was ordained by the Methodists in 1799, but his congregation of free African Americans in Philadelphia left the church there because of its discrimination. They founded the African Methodist Episcopal Church (AME) in Philadelphia. After first submitting to oversight by the established Methodist bishops, several AME congregations finally left to form the first independent African-American denomination in the United States in 1816. Soon after, the African Methodist Episcopal Zion Church (AME Zion) was founded as another denomination in New York City.

Early Baptist congregations were formed by slaves and free African Americans in South Carolina and Virginia. Especially in the Baptist Church, African Americans were welcomed as members and as preachers. By the early 19th century, independent African-American congregations numbered in the several hundreds in some cities of the South, such as Charleston, South Carolina, and Richmond and Petersburg, Virginia. With the growth in congregations and churches, Baptist associations formed in Virginia, for instance, as well as Kentucky and other states.

The revival also inspired slaves to demand freedom. In 1800, out of African-American revival meetings in Virginia, a plan for slave rebellion was devised by Gabriel Prosser, although the rebellion was discovered and crushed before it started. Despite white attempts to control independent African-American congregations, especially after the Nat Turner uprising of 1831, a number of African-American congregations managed to maintain their separation as independent congregations in Baptist associations. State legislatures passed laws requiring them always to have a white man present at their worship meetings.

== Women ==
Women made up the majority of converts during the Awakening, making up roughly two thirds of converts during this period, and they played a crucial role in its development and focus. It is not clear why women converted in larger numbers than men. Various scholarly theories attribute the discrepancy to a reaction to the perceived sinfulness of youthful frivolity, an inherent greater sense of religiosity in women, a communal reaction to economic insecurity, or an assertion of the self in the face of patriarchal rule. Husbands, especially in the South, sometimes disapproved of their wives' conversion, forcing women to choose between submission to God or their spouses. Church membership and religious activity gave women peer support and place for meaningful activity outside the home, providing many women with communal identity and shared experiences. At the same time, women began to be seen as more virtuous than men.

Despite the predominance of women in the movement, they were not formally indoctrinated or given leading ministerial positions. However, women took other public roles; for example, relaying testimonials about their conversion experience, or assisting sinners (both male and female) through the conversion process. Leaders such as Charles Finney saw women's public prayer as a crucial aspect in preparing a community for revival and improving their efficacy in conversion. Women also took crucial roles in the conversion and religious upbringing of children. During the period of revival, mothers were seen as the moral and spiritual foundation of the family, and were thus tasked with instructing children in matters of religion and ethics.

The greatest change in women's roles stemmed from participation in newly formalized missionary and reform societies. Women's prayer groups were an early and socially acceptable form of women's organization. In the 1830s, female moral reform societies rapidly spread across the North making it the first predominantly female social movement. Through women's positions in these organizations, women gained influence outside of the private sphere.

Changing demographics of gender also affected religious doctrine. In an effort to give sermons that would resonate with the congregation, ministers stressed Christ's humility and forgiveness, in what the historian Barbara Welter calls a "feminization" of Christianity. Women preaching also began to be more common during this time, until a backlash towards the end of the period clamped down on it, and Catherine Brekus argues that this backlash was a major reason the Awakening came to an end.

== Political implications ==
Revivals and perfectionist hopes of improving individuals and society continued to increase from 1840 to 1865 across all major denominations, especially in urban areas. Evangelists often directly addressed issues such as slavery, greed, and poverty, laying the groundwork for later reform movements. The influence of the Awakening continued in the form of more secular movements. In the midst of shifts in theology and church polity, American Christians began progressive movements to reform society during this period. Known commonly as antebellum reform, this phenomenon included reforms against the consumption of alcohol, for women's rights and abolition of slavery, and a multitude of other issues faced by society.

The religious enthusiasm of the Second Great Awakening was echoed by the new political enthusiasm of the Second Party System. More active participation in politics by more segments of the population brought religious and moral issues into the political sphere. The spirit of evangelical humanitarian reforms was carried on in the antebellum Whig party.

Historians stress the common understanding among participants of reform as being a part of God's plan. As a result, local churches saw their roles in society in purifying the world through the individuals to whom they could bring salvation, and through changes in the law and the creation of institutions. Interest in transforming the world was applied to mainstream political action, as temperance activists, antislavery advocates, and proponents of other variations of reform sought to implement their beliefs into national politics. While Protestant religion had previously played an important role on the American political scene, the Second Great Awakening strengthened the role it would play.

== Prominent figures ==
- Richard Allen, founder, African Methodist Episcopal Church
- Francis Asbury, Methodist, circuit rider and founder of the Methodist Episcopal Church
- Henry Ward Beecher, Congregationalist, son of Lyman Beecher
- Lyman Beecher, Presbyterian
- Antoinette Brown Blackwell, Congregationalist and later Unitarian, the first ordained female minister in the United States
- Alexander Campbell, Presbyterian, and early leader of the Restoration Movement
- Thomas Campbell, Presbyterian, then early leader of the Restoration Movement
- Peter Cartwright, Methodist
- Maria Cook, first woman to be recognized as a Universalist preacher
- Lorenzo Dow, Methodist
- Timothy Dwight IV, Congregationalist
- Charles Grandison Finney, Presbyterian and anti-Calvinist, second president of Oberlin College
- Charles Fitch, Millerite
- "Black Harry" Hosier, Methodist, the first African American to preach to a white congregation
- Joshua V. Himes, Adventist
- Adoniram Judson, early Baptist missionary.
- Jarena Lee, Methodist, a female AME circuit rider
- Robert Matthews, cult following as Matthias the Prophet
- William Miller, Millerism, forerunner of Adventism
- Asahel Nettleton, Reformed
- Phoebe Palmer, one of the founders of the Holiness movement
- Benjamin Randall, Free Will Baptist
- Luther Rice, Baptist missionary to India, and Baptist missionary in the US South
- Joseph Smith, The Church of Jesus Christ of Latter-day Saints, early leader of the Restoration Movement
- Barton Stone, Presbyterian non-Calvinist, then early leader of the Restoration Movement
- Nathaniel William Taylor, heterodox Calvinist
- Ellen G. White, Seventh-day Adventist Church prophetess

== See also ==
- Advent Christian Church
- Christian revival
- Christianity in the 19th century
- The Church of Jesus Christ of Latter-day Saints
- Cumberland Presbyterian Church
- Ethnocultural politics in the United States
- Holiness movement
- Restoration Movement
- Seventh-day Adventist Church
