= Richland–West End Historic District =

Historic district in Tennessee, United States

- U.S. National Register of Historic Places
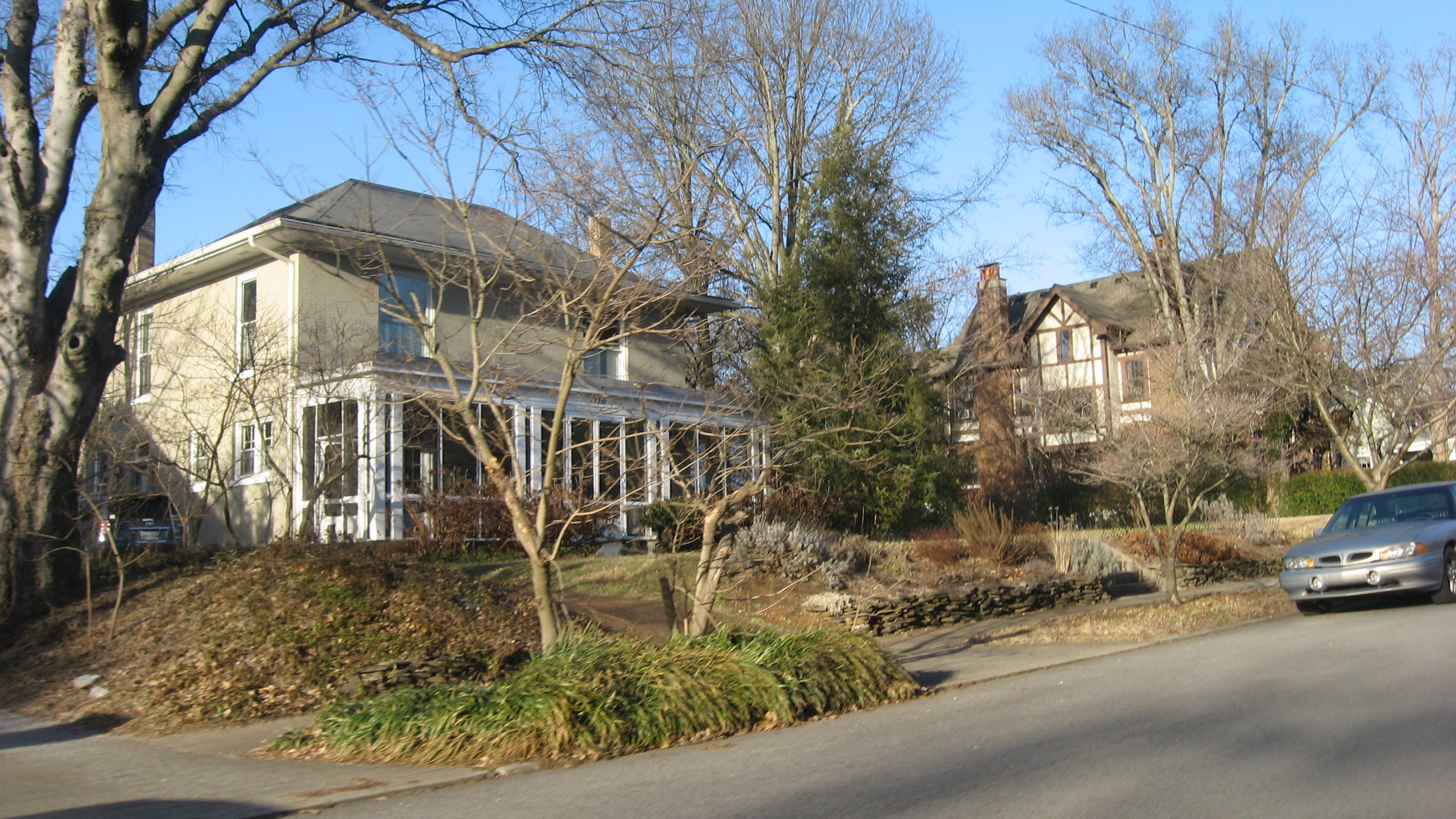
- Central Avenue in 2014

- Location within Tennessee Location within the United States
- Location: Roughly bounded by RR tracks, Murphy Rd., Park Circle, Wilson and Richland Aves., Nashville, Tennessee
- Coordinates: 36.1360°N 86.8289°W
- Area: 135 acres (55 ha)
- Architectural style: Bungalow/craftsman, Foursquare
- NRHP reference No.: 79002425
- Added to NRHP: April 16, 1979

The Richland–West End Historic District is a historic district on the Western side of Nashville, Tennessee. It comprises approximately a 12-block area consisting mostly of Bungalow/craftsman architecture and about 70 Foursquare-style houses.

== History ==
In the Antebellum Era, the district was a plantation owned by John Brown Craighead, the son of Presbyterian minister Thomas B. Craighead. John Brown Craighead's wife, Jane Erwin Dickinson, was the widow of Charles Dickinson, who was killed in an 1806 duel with future U.S. president Andrew Jackson. The plantation remained in the Craighead family until the end of the American Civil War. By 1905, the Richland Realty Company developed the area, by laying out streets and building bungalows.

The district has been listed on the National Register of Historic Places since April 16, 1979.

The original Craighead House has award-winning gardens and architecture.

== See also ==
- National Register of Historic Places listings in Davidson County, Tennessee
