= Craighead House (Nashville, Tennessee) =

- U.S. Historic district – Contributing property
- Location within Tennessee Location within the United States
- Location: 3710 Westbrook Avenue, Nashville, Tennessee
- Coordinates: 36.1389°N 86.8310°W
- Built: 1812
- Part of: Richland-West End Historic District (ID79002425)
- Designated CP: April 16, 1979

Craighead House, at 3710 Westbrook Avenue in Nashville, Tennessee, is a Federal style house built in circa 1810, perhaps 1812. It is one of the oldest brick houses in Nashville. The house's gardens were a featured garden of the Garden Club of Nashville.

It was built by John Brown Craighead and was the "manor house" of his 194-acre (79 ha) plantation. John Brown Craighead's wife, Jane Erwin Dickinson, was the widow of Charles Dickinson, who was killed in an 1806 duel with future president Andrew Jackson. John Craighead was son of Presbyterian minister Thomas B. Craighead.

The plantation remained in the Craighead family until the end of the American Civil War. The property was subdivided in 1905 or soon thereafter by the Richland Realty Company and became a "trolley car neighborhood". The neighborhood eventually became historic, itself, and is listed on the National Register of Historic Places as Richland-West End Historic District.

The house is listed on the Tennessee Register of Historic Places and is zoned within a historic overlay for the Richland and West End neighborhoods of Nashville. The house received an Architectural Award in 1999 from Metropolitan Nashville's Historical Commission, and in 2014 the gardens (one acre remaining from the original 194-acre estate) were added to the Archives of American Gardens.
