= Gasper River =

River in Kentucky, United States

Coordinates: 37°05′04″N 86°34′30″W

Location
- Country: US

Physical characteristics
- Mouth
  - location: Barren River
  - elevation: 420 feet (130 m)
- Length: 39 mi (63 km)

The Gasper River is a 38.6-mile-long (62.1 km) river in southwestern Kentucky, United States. It flows northeasterly into the Barren River. It is a rural river; the only community near it is unincorporated Hadley in Warren County. It begins in northeast Logan County, and the river also flows through Warren and Logan counties. Tributaries include Belcher, Salt Lick, Brush, Clear Fork, Westbrook, and Rock House creeks.

It is about 40 to 60 feet (12 to 18 m) wide and has a few small rapids. It is considered a mid-difficulty stream for canoeing.

The name, "Gasper River," is a corruption of "Casper's River," as clearly named on John Filson's map of Kentucky (1784), and bears the namesake of Kasper/Casper Mansker, longhunter and pioneer of Kentucky and Tennessee. Mansker's Station was located due south near present-day Goodlettsville, Tennessee.

At the confluence with the Barren River is Sally's Rock, used as a river pilot's guide. It is named for Sally Beck, a local who delivered news to passing river boats in the 1880s.

The river was part of a land grant given to George Washington Jr., nephew of George Washington, the president. He surveyed the land in 1785. The Gasper River was site of the home church of Reverend James McGready, and religious revivals were held on its banks as early as 1797, constituting the first ever open-air tent revival or camp meeting. In 1800 McGready began a revival at the nearby Red River Meeting House, which sparked the Second Great Awakening, and many of the congregants present were from the Gasper River church.

== See also ==
- List of Kentucky rivers
