= James McGready =

Rev. James McGready (1763–1817) was a Presbyterian minister and a revivalist during the Second Great Awakening in the United States of America. He was one of the most important figures of the Second Great Awakening in the American frontier.

== Early life ==
McGready was of British descent, and was born in Pennsylvania. When he was quite young, his father moved from Pennsylvania, and settled in Guilford County, North Carolina. An uncle, who was on a visit to his father's family, from Pennsylvania, thought that the boy's character fitted him to be educated for the ministry, and asked his parents to allow their son to accompany him back to Pennsylvania.

About the time of his commencing his studies preparatory to the work of the ministry, he was convinced by a sermon of a certain Reverend Smith, of the unsoundness of his previous religious convictions. Smith, in his history of the Cumberland Presbyterian Church, says that his religious awakening was attributable to a conversation of two friends, overheard by McGready, in which they expressed their fears that he was not a truly converted man. Foote, in his Sketches of North Carolina, confirms the latter account.

== Revival ==
In the fall of 1785, Mr. Smith, who, according to the first tradition, was the means of his awakening, opened a school for the purpose of assisting young men in preparing for the ministry, and young McGready immediately became one of his pupils. He remained here for some time, and then entered a school recently opened by Rev. Dr. John McMillan, with whom he had spent some time after his arrival with his uncle from North Carolina. Dr. McMillan's school grew into what is now Washington & Jefferson College.

When McGready had completed his literary and theological studies, he was licensed to preach by the Presbytery of Redstone, on August 13, 1788, when he was about thirty years of age. In the following autumn or winter, he returned to North Carolina, and on his way spent some time with Dr. John Blair Smith, at Hampden-Sydney College in Virginia. Dr. Smith had been connected with a powerful religious revival that occurred in his neighborhood about that time, and McGready seems to have been deeply affected by what he saw and heard of that revival.

== Ministry ==
On his arrival in North Carolina, he found the churches in an unsatisfactory state. His preaching was the means of awakening increased interest on the subject of religion. According to one account: "His labors at an academy under the care of Dr. Caldwell, were instrumental in producing a revival of religion, in which ten or twelve young men were brought into the fold, all of whom became ministers of the gospel, and some of them were subsequently his fellow-laborers in the far West."

About the year 1790, McGready married, and became the pastor of a congregation in Orange County. "Here he labored with his wonted zeal, and often with great success." His zeal provoked opposition, and he was accused of distracting people from their labors and creating unnecessary alarm among decent and orderly people. "A letter was written to him in blood, requiring him to leave the country at the peril of his life; and a number of wicked men and women of the baser sort, on a certain occasion during the week, assembled in his church, tore down the seats, set fire to the pulpit, and burnt it to ashes."

On the following Sunday, when the congregation met for worship, a scene of confusion and desolation presented itself. He, however, proceeded with the service, using a relevant and solemn psalm, and delivering a sermon from the following text: "O Jerusalem, Jerusalem, thou that killest the prophets, and stonest them which are sent unto thee, how often would I have gathered thy children together, even as a hen gathereth her chickens under her wings, and ye would not! Behold your house is left unto you desolate."

In 1796 McGready left North Carolina for Kentucky. After spending a few months in East Tennessee, he reached his destination, and took the pastoral charge of three congregations in Logan County – Gaspar River, Red River, and Muddy River. These congregations were small, and in a low state of religious interest. He presented to the members of his congregation for their approval and signatures, the following preamble and covenant:

When we consider the word and promises of a compassionate God to the poor lost family of Adam, we find the strongest encouragement for Christians to pray in faith--to ask in the name of Jesus for the conversion of their fellow-men. None ever went to Christ when on earth, with the case of their friends, that were denied, and, although the days of his humiliation are ended, yet, for the encouragement of his people, he has left it on record, that where two or three agree upon earth to ask in prayer, believing, it shall be done. Again, whatsoever you shall ask the Father in my name, that will I do, that the Father may be glorified in the Son. With these promises before us, we feel encouraged to unite our supplications to a prayer-hearing God for the outpouring of his Spirit, that his people may be quickened and comforted, and that our children, and sinners generally, may be converted. Therefore, we bind ourselves to observe the third Saturday of each month, for one year, as a day of fasting and prayer for the conversion of sinners in Logan county, and throughout the world. We also engage to spend one half hour every Saturday evening, beginning at the setting of the sun, and one half hour every Sabbath morning, from the rising of the sun, pleading with God to revive his work.

To this covenant he and they affixed their names. The writer recollects to have heard the late Dr. Alfred M. Bryan state that his father, and perhaps his mother, were subscribers, among others. In May, 1797, the first signs of promise appeared, in the conversion of a female member of one of his congregations, who had been in the communion of the Church for some time. These favorable indications continued through the summer, but were followed by a temporary reaction through the fall and winter.

The following summer, the religious movement intensified. During a sacramental meeting at the Gaspar River Meeting-house, a significant religious revival occurred, leading many attendees to focus extensively on their religious convictions in the following weeks. This event marked the beginning of the Revival of 1800. During this period, McGready became a central figure in the movement, actively advocating for and promoting the revival across the region.

When the difficulties began to develop themselves, which resulted in the organization of the Cumberland Presbyterian Church, Mr. McGready for a time took a decided stand, as we would have expected, with the revival party. As these difficulties progressed, however, and became more serious than he expected, he faltered. It is, perhaps, not a matter of surprise. He was a Calvinists of the old school. He had received his early theological impressions, and his impressions of ecclesiastical order, from Dr. McMillan and old Red Stone Presbytery, types of the sternest Presbyterianism. He had no idea, it is supposed, when the troubles commenced, that they would become so complicated and embarrassing. Another consideration may be added. Although a man of great power in the pulpit, he was not a man for ecclesiastical conflict. He was not adapted to the leadership of a party.

In December 1805 he was cited, with Revs. Messrs. William Hodge, William McGee, Samuel McAdow, and John Rankin, to appear before the next meeting of Kentucky Synod, to account for their conduct in not submitting the young men for reexamination to the Commission of the Synod. The history of the Commission is known.Following his citation by the Commission of the Synod, he successfully reconciled with both the Synod and the Transylvania Presbytery. Records indicate his return to formal proceedings in 1809, marking his first documented attendance since the initial disciplinary action.

Shortly after Mr. McGready's defection from the Council out of which the Cumberland Presbytery of 1810 grew, he left Logan county, and settled in Henderson county, Kentucky, where he remained until his death, which occurred in February, 1817.

== Later years ==
Of his later years, not much is known. It is known, however, that he continued his ministerial work, with his usual fidelity. But from some cause his labors were not as successful as they had formerly been. This was perhaps partly attributable to such a failure of physical strength and animation as declining age naturally brings. His friends, too, thought that the former unction of his ministry was wanting. It is recorded that in the fall of 1816, a few months before his death, he attended a Cumberland Presbyterian camp-meeting near Evansville, Indiana, where he preached with great power and success. At the close of a very impressive sermon on "The character, history, and end of the fool." he came out of the pulpit, called together the anxious, and prayed for them with great fervency. When he closed, he arose from his knees, and exclaimed with a loud voice, "O blessed be God! I this day feel the same holy fire that filled my soul sixteen years ago, during the glorious revival of 1800."
