= Thomas B. Craighead (minister) =

Thomas Brown Craighead
- Born: 1753
- Died: 11 September 1824 (aged 70–71); Nashville, Tennessee, U.S.
- Resting place: Spring Hill Cemetery
- Education: Princeton University
- Occupations: Preacher, educator
- Children: John Brown Craighead, William Brown Craighead, Jane Craighead, David Craighead, Alexander Craighead, James Brown Craighead and Thomas Brown Craighead Jr.

Thomas Brown Craighead (1753—1824) was an American Presbyterian minister and educator. He served as the president of the Davidson Academy from 1786 to 1806, and Cumberland College from 1806 to 1809, two precursors to the University of Nashville. By 1811, he was ostracized by the Presbyterian Church and barred from preaching because of his belief in free will.

== Early life ==
Thomas Brown Craighead was born in Augusta County, Virginia, a son of the Rev. Alexander and Agnes (Brown) Craighead. His grandfather was a noted Presbyterian pastor, Rev. Thomas Craighead. He graduated from the College of New Jersey (later known as Princeton University) in 1775.

== Career ==
Craighead started his career as an educator in North Carolina, South Carolina and Kentucky, where he taught in Presbyterian schools.

Craighead moved to Nashville, Tennessee in 1785. He founded the Davidson Academy in 1786, and served as its president from 1786 to 1806. The school was located in a house where the Spring Hill Cemetery is now situated. When the school became known as Cumberland College, he served as its president from 1806 to 1809. Both institutions were precursors to the University of Nashville.

Craighead was ostracized by the Presbyterian Church and barred from preaching from 1811 until his death due to his belief in free will at the expense of original sin.

== Death and legacy ==
Craighead died in 1824. He was buried at the Spring Hill Cemetery in Nashville. His son, John Brown Craighead, was the owner of a large plantation where the Richland-West End Historic District now stands; he married Jane Erwin Dickerson, who had been widowed after her husband was killed in a duel with future President Andrew Jackson in 1806.
