= Communion season =

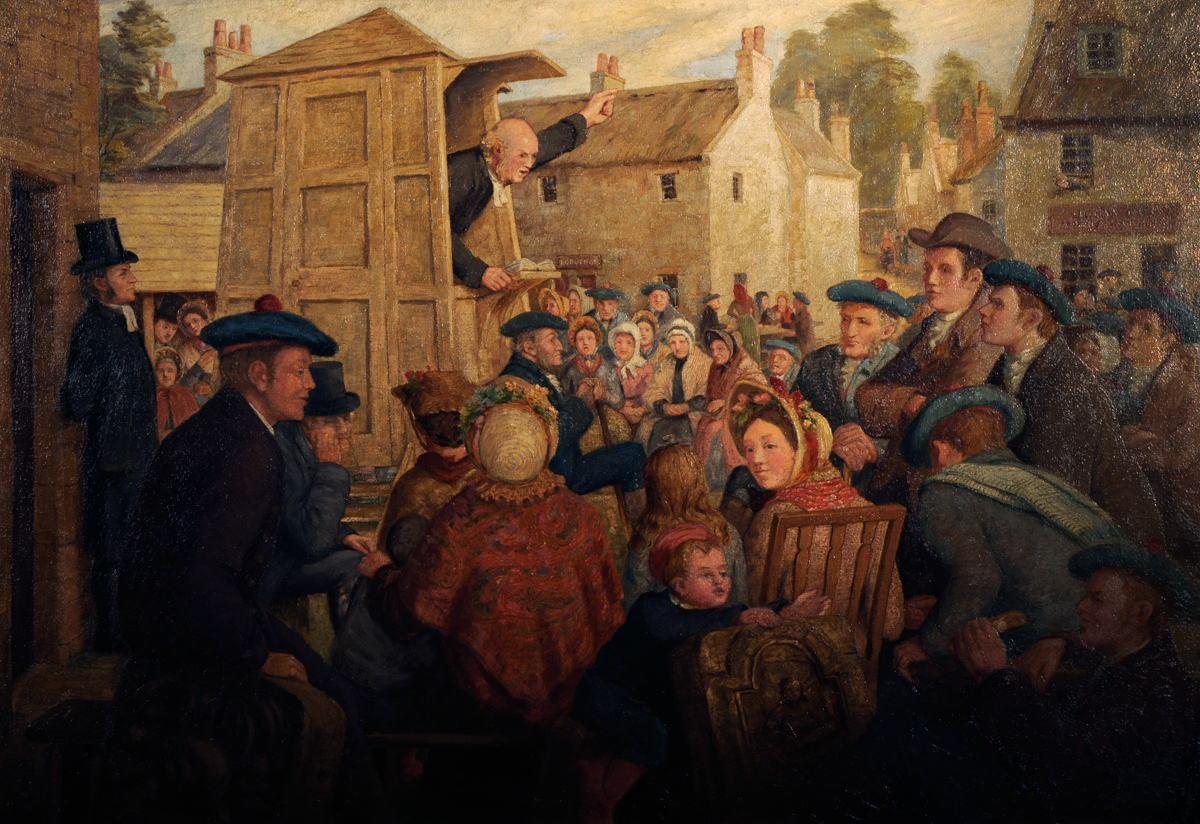
The Holy Fair, by Robert Bryden

In Scottish presbyterianism, a communion season, sometimes called a holy fair, is an annual week-long festival culminating with the celebration of the Lord's supper (communion). It usually begins with a Thursday fast. On Friday, known as the question day, lay catechists, called "the men", would give their interpretations of Bible verses chosen by the minister. They would occasionally emerge as charismatic leaders of local revivals. A day of preparation would be held on Saturday. The climax was the Sabbath day celebration of communion, often outdoors in a natural amphitheatre. A thanksgiving service would be held on Monday.

The practice of celebrating communion only once a year developed by the eighteenth century as a result of hostility toward episcopacy, poverty, and lack of ministers. Where ministers refused or neglected parish communion, large assemblies were carried out in the open air, often combining several parishes. These large gatherings were discouraged by the General Assembly of the Church of Scotland, but continued. They could become mixed with secular activities and were commemorated as such by Robert Burns in the poem "Holy Fair". In the Highlands communicants travelled great distances and lodged with friends and family.

In the United States, Presbyterians incorporated communion seasons into evangelical revivalism, and there the practice contributed to the development of the camp meeting.
