= Mary Rippon =

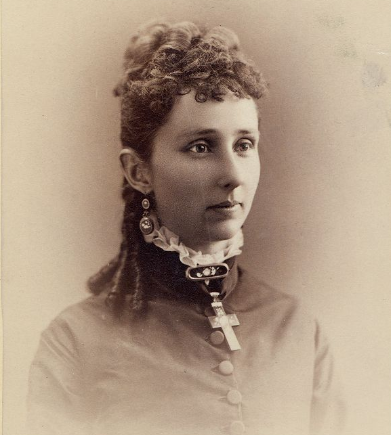
- Mary Rippon
- Born: May 25, 1850; Lisbon, Illinois
- Died: September 8, 1935 (aged 85); Boulder, Colorado
- Known for: First female professor at University of Colorado
- Children: Miriam Housel

Mary Rippon (May 25, 1850 - September 8, 1935) is believed to have been the first woman to teach at a state university. She was the first female professor at the University of Colorado Boulder. Rippon began teaching French and German at CU in 1878, became head of Germanic languages and literature, and served at the university until 1909. Mary Rippon Outdoor Theatre, the location of the annual Colorado Shakespeare Festival, is named in her honor.

== Early life ==
Mary Rippon was born May 25, 1850, in Lisbon, Illinois, to Thomas Rippon and Jane Skinner, who had immigrated from England. Her father died when she was ten months old, and because he did not leave a will and Mary was his only child, she inherited his farm. After her mother abandoned her, she lived with neighbors and extended family.

She attended the high school department of Illinois State Normal University, a teacher training school. Money from the sale of the farm funded her education, and when she turned 18 she had access to the remainder of her inheritance.

After high school, Rippon spent five years studying in Germany, Switzerland, and France.

== Education and career ==
Rippon taught German at a high school in Detroit for one school year from 1876 to 1877. In 1877, she received an offer of employment from Joseph Sewall, who had taught at Illinois Normal School and was the first president of the newly established University of Colorado. She joined the University of Colorado faculty in January 1878. Rippon arrived at the University of Colorado to teach German and French language and literature; during the first term she also taught English grammar and mathematics. In 1891 she became head of the Department of Modern Languages, which later became the Department of Germanic Languages and Literature. Mary Rippon retired from teaching in 1909.

== Personal life ==
In 1887, at age thirty-seven, Rippon met Will Housel, a student in her German class, who was then twenty-five. The two engaged in a romantic relationship. When she became pregnant, Rippon took a year off from teaching and went to Europe, secretly marrying Housel in St. Louis on the way. When she returned to the university, her daughter Miriam remained behind, first with Housel and later in an orphanage. Housel returned to Colorado, but the two never lived together. Rippon provided financial support to Miriam and Housel, even after he remarried. Rippon occasionally visited her daughter, but Miriam believed Rippon was her aunt.

Rippon's family remained a secret, even while Miriam taught at the University of Colorado. In the 1970s, Miriam's son revealed that he was Rippon's descendant.

== Posthumous honors ==
Mary Rippon died on September 8, 1935, from myocarditis. The Regents of the University of Colorado approved plans for an outdoor theatre named in her honor. The Mary Rippon Theatre, located on CU's campus, hosts the annual Colorado Shakespeare Festival each summer.

In 1985, Rippon was inducted into the Colorado Women's Hall of Fame.

Rippon was awarded a posthumous honorary doctorate from the University of Colorado in May 2006.

Separate Lives: Uncovering the Hidden Family of Victorian Professor Mary Rippon, by Silvia Pettem (Lyons Press 2024) updates Pettem's previous edition of Separate Lives and brings Rippon's story into the 21st century.
