= University of Colorado Boulder =

American public research university

- Former name: University of Colorado (1876–1965)
- Motto: Λαμψάτω τὸ φῶς ὑμῶν (Greek)
- Motto in English: "Let your light shine"
- Type: Public research university
- Established: March 14, 1876; 150 years ago
- Parent institution: University of Colorado
- Accreditation: HLC
- Academic affiliations: AAU; ORAU; UArctic; URA; Space-grant
- Endowment: $2.47 billion (FY2025) (system-wide)
- Chancellor: Justin Schwartz
- President: Todd Saliman
- Provost: Russell Moore
- Faculty: 3,495 (fall 2025)
- Students: 38,508 (fall 2026)
- Undergraduates: 32,637 (fall 2026)
- Postgraduates: 5,871 (fall 2026)
- Location: Boulder, Colorado, United States; 40.0073°N 105.2678°W
- Campus: 786 acres (3.18 km^{2}); Midsize city
- Colors: Silver, black, and gold
- Nickname: Buffaloes
- Sporting affiliations: NCAA Division I FBS – Big 12
- Mascots: Ralphie (bison); Chip (costume)
- Website: www.colorado.edu

The University of Colorado Boulder (CU Boulder, CU, or Colorado) is a public research university in Boulder, Colorado, United States. Founded in 1876, five months before Colorado became a state, it is the flagship university of the University of Colorado system. CU Boulder is a member of the Association of American Universities, is classified among "R1: Doctoral Universities – Very high research activity" and has been referred to as a Public Ivy.

The university consists of nine colleges and schools and offers over 150 academic programs, enrolling more than 35,000 students as of January 2022. In 2021, the university attracted the support of over $634 million for research and spent $536 million on research and development according to the National Science Foundation, ranking it 50th in the nation. It receives the most NASA astrophysics technology grants of all academic institutions and is the only university in the world that has sent instruments to all planets in the Solar System.

The Colorado Buffaloes compete in 17 varsity sports and are members of the NCAA Division I Big 12 Conference. The Buffaloes have won 28 national championships: 20 in skiing, 7 total in men's and women's cross country, and 1 in football. The university has produced 10 Olympic medalists. Alumni, faculty, and researchers have included 12 Nobel Prize laureates (of whom 5 were affiliated with the university when the prizes were awarded), 10 Pulitzer Prize winners, 11 MacArthur Fellows, 1 Turing Award laureate, 20 astronauts and 2 associate justices of the United States Supreme Court.

== History ==
On March 14, 1876, the Colorado territorial legislature passed an amendment to the state constitution that provided money for the establishment of the University of Colorado in Boulder, the Colorado School of Mines in Golden, and the Colorado Agricultural College in Fort Collins.

The cornerstone of the building that became Old Main was laid on September 20, 1875. The doors of the university opened on September 5, 1877. At the time, there were few high schools in the state that could adequately prepare students for university work, so in addition to the university, a preparatory school was formed on campus. In the fall of 1877, the student body consisted of 15 students in the college proper and 50 students in the preparatory school. There were 38 men and 27 women, and their ages ranged from 12 to 23 years.

During World War II, Colorado was one of 131 colleges and universities nationally that took part in the V-12 Navy College Training Program which offered students a path to a navy commission.

CU hired its first female professor, Mary Rippon, in 1878. It hired its first African-American professor, Charles H. Nilon, in 1956, and its first African-American librarian, Mildred Nilon, in 1962. Its first African American female graduate, Lucile Berkeley Buchanan, received her degree in 1918.

== Campus ==
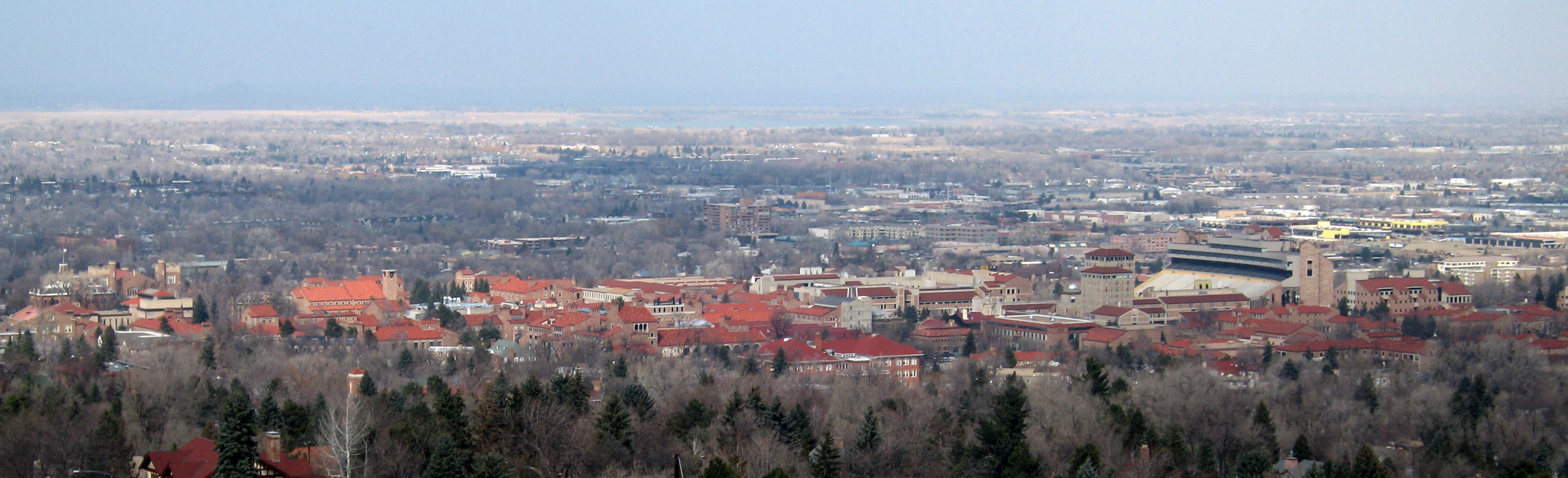
The CU Boulder campus

The main CU Boulder campus is located south of the Pearl Street Mall and east of Chautauqua Auditorium. It consists of academic and residential buildings as well as research facilities. The East Campus is about a quarter-mile from the main campus and is composed mainly of athletic fields and research buildings. CU Boulder's campus has been ranked as one of the most beautiful college campuses in the United States by Travel + Leisure and Condé Nast Traveler.

=== Architecture ===
CU Boulder's distinctive architecture style, known as Tuscan Vernacular Revival, was designed by architect Charles Klauder. The oldest buildings, such as Old Main (1876) and Macky Auditorium (1923), were in the Collegiate Gothic style of many East Coast schools, and Klauder's initial plans for the university's new buildings (approved in 1919) were in the same style. A month or so after approval, however, Klauder updated his design by sketching in a new wrap of rough, textured sandstone walls with sloping, multi-leveled red-orange-tiled roofs and Indiana limestone trim. This formed the basis of a unified style, used in the design of fifteen other buildings between 1921 and 1939 and still followed on the campus to this day. The sandstone used in the construction of nearly all the buildings on campus was selected from a variety of Front Range mountain quarries.

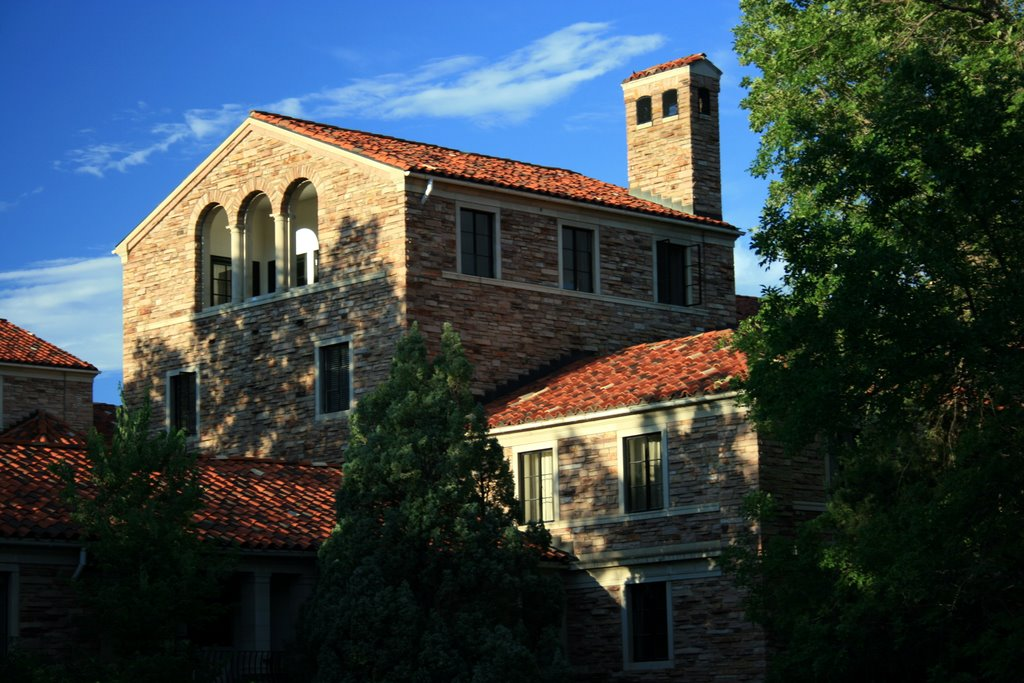
Sewall Hall

=== Residence halls ===
Currently, freshmen and others attending the University of Colorado Boulder have the option of 24 on- and off-campus residence halls. Residence halls have 17 varieties of room types from singles to four-person rooms and others with apartment-style amenities. There are several communities of residence halls located throughout the campus, as well as in a separate area called Williams Village which is located approximately 1.5 miles off of the main campus. There is a free bus service that transports students to the main campus from Williams Village and vice versa. The university also offers Residential Academic Programs (RAPS) in many of its Residence Halls. RAPs provide students with in-dorm classes tailored to academic interests (international affairs, environmental studies, etc.).

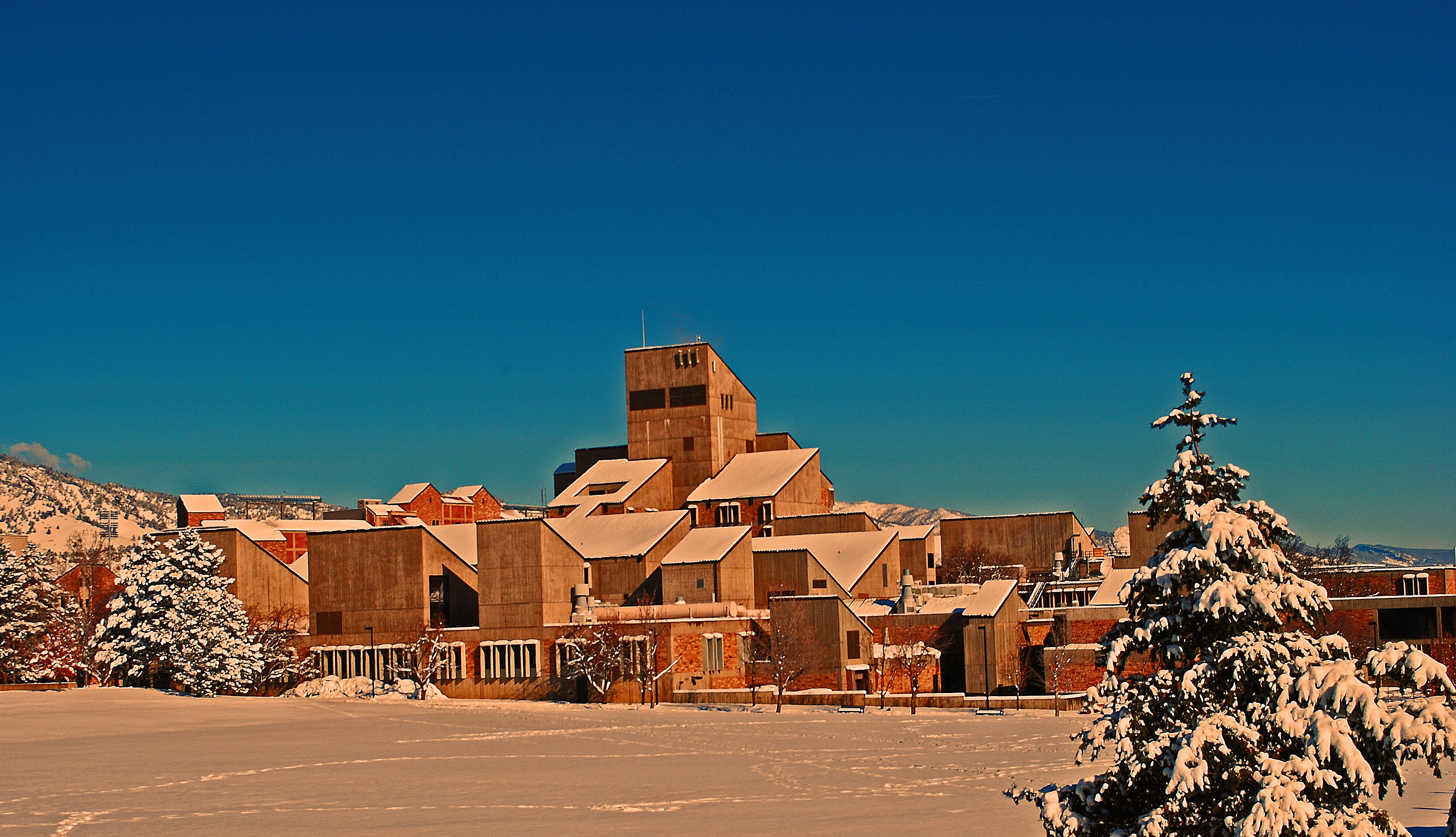
Engineering Center

=== Engineering Center ===
The Engineering Center on the Northeast side of campus houses the nation's largest geotechnical centrifuge as well as ion-implantation and microwave-propagation facilities, spectrometers, electron and other microscopes, and a structural analysis facility. In 2021, the Rustandy Building joined the Engineering Center to the Koelbel Building, in order to increase collaboration with the School of Business.

=== Norlin Library ===
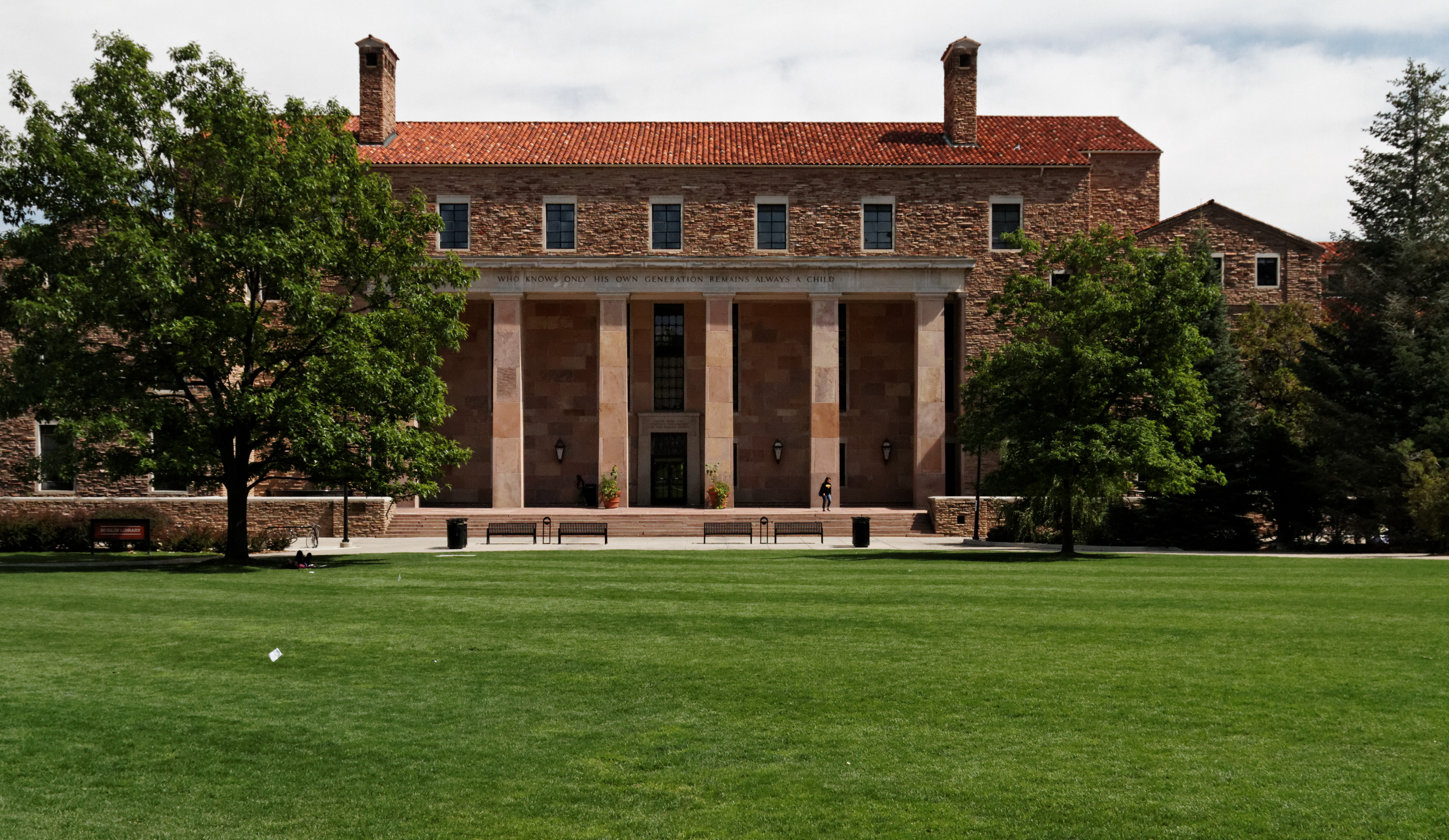
Norlin Library

Until 1903, the library collection was housed with the rest of the school in Old Main. The growing size of the library required a move, as the weight of the books was causing physical damage to the floor. The cornerstone for the first separate library building was laid in January 1903, and the building was opened in January 1904. When the new Norlin Library opened in 1940, the old library was turned over to the Theatre department and was converted into classrooms and a theatre.

Norlin Library was the last building to be designed by Klauder. There are two inscriptions on the western face of the building, overlooking the Norlin Quadrangle. Both were composed by President Norlin. The larger inscription reads "Who knows only his own generation remains always a child," based on a Cicero quotation, while the smaller inscription on the marble just over the door reads "Enter here the timeless fellowship of the human spirit."

=== Macky Auditorium ===
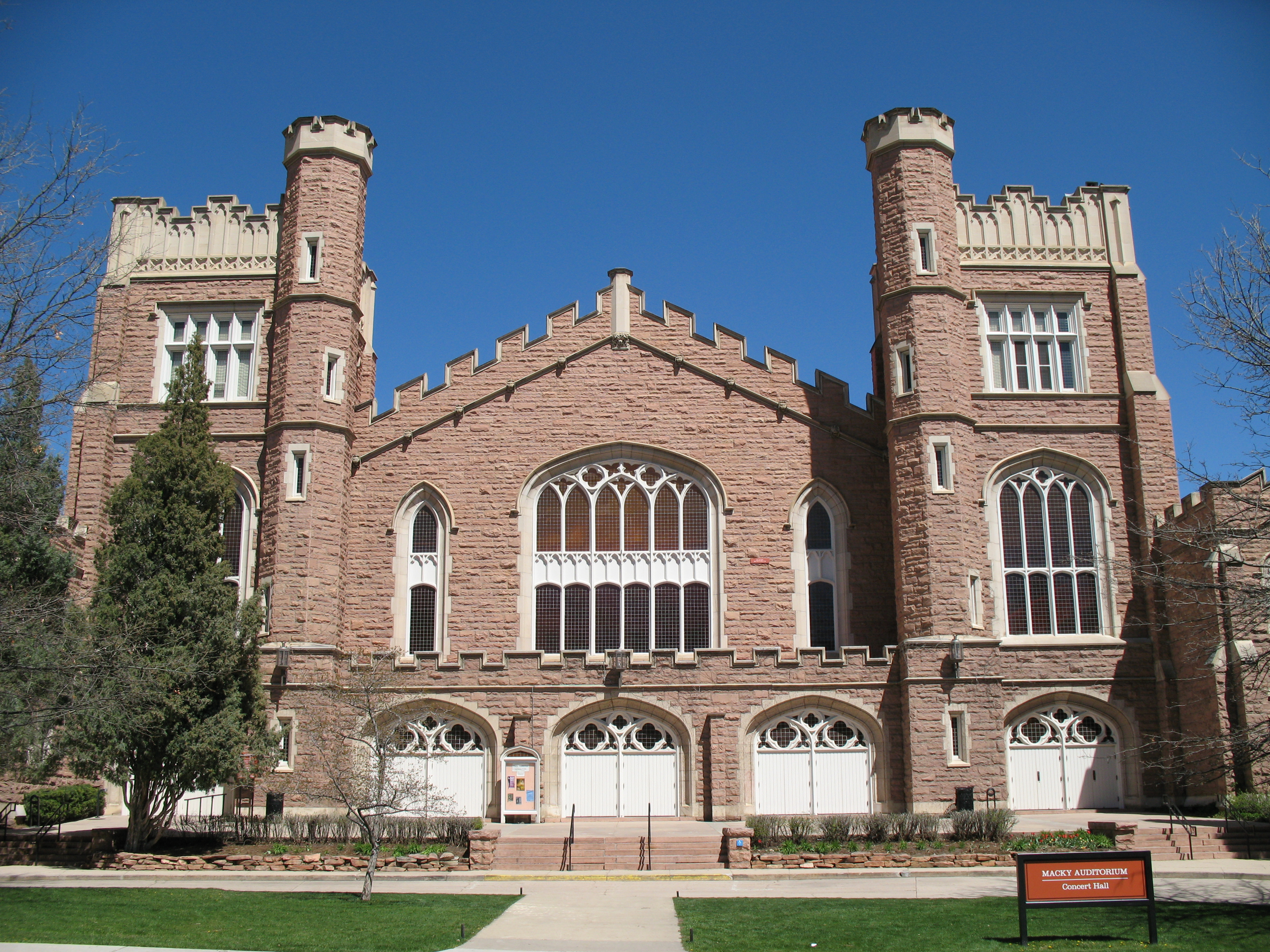
Macky Auditorium

Macky Auditorium is a large building on the north edge of the University of Colorado campus, near 17th Street and University Avenue, which plays host to various talks, plays, and musical performances. Andrew J. Macky was a prominent businessman involved with the town of Boulder in the late 19th century. Macky served as the president, as well as a stockholder of the First National Bank, an institution founded by another early CU supporter, Lewis Cheney. Macky is credited with a number of landmarks throughout Boulder, where he was a carpenter and involved in politics.

The auditorium opened its doors in 1923, thirteen years after construction started. Macky's adopted daughter, May, sued for a third of Macky's estate, a case that took thirteen years to settle. May was angered that her father left her no money in his will, while leaving $300,000 to CU for the hall's construction. The university eventually won the case, and the majority of critical construction on the building resumed.

The building has a variety of architectural elements from various buildings around the globe that President James Baker, CU's president at the turn of the 20th century, admired. The design of the auditorium is primarily Neo-Gothic, with the primary materials being sandstone and red tile, like the rest of campus. The result is a unique building, with two large towers and sprawling ivy, that sets itself apart from the rest of the CU campus. Macky was refurbished in 1986, with improved seating, custom carpeting, modern plumbing, and an elevator. The towers' electronic bell system rings the hours during the day.

Macky is the home of two departments, both in the College of Music: the Jazz Studies Department and the Choral Department. The lobby art gallery is open to patrons during performances, and to the general public at some other times during the week. The auditorium, with seating for 2,000, hosts almost all performances by the Boulder Philharmonic Orchestra, the Artist Series, and the CU Opera. Macky is also the home of many lectures, including the annual Conference on World Affairs (CWA) opening keynote. In some recent years, the venue has also hosted CWA panel discussions, Cinema Interruptus movie screenings and the popular jazz concert.

=== University Memorial Center ===
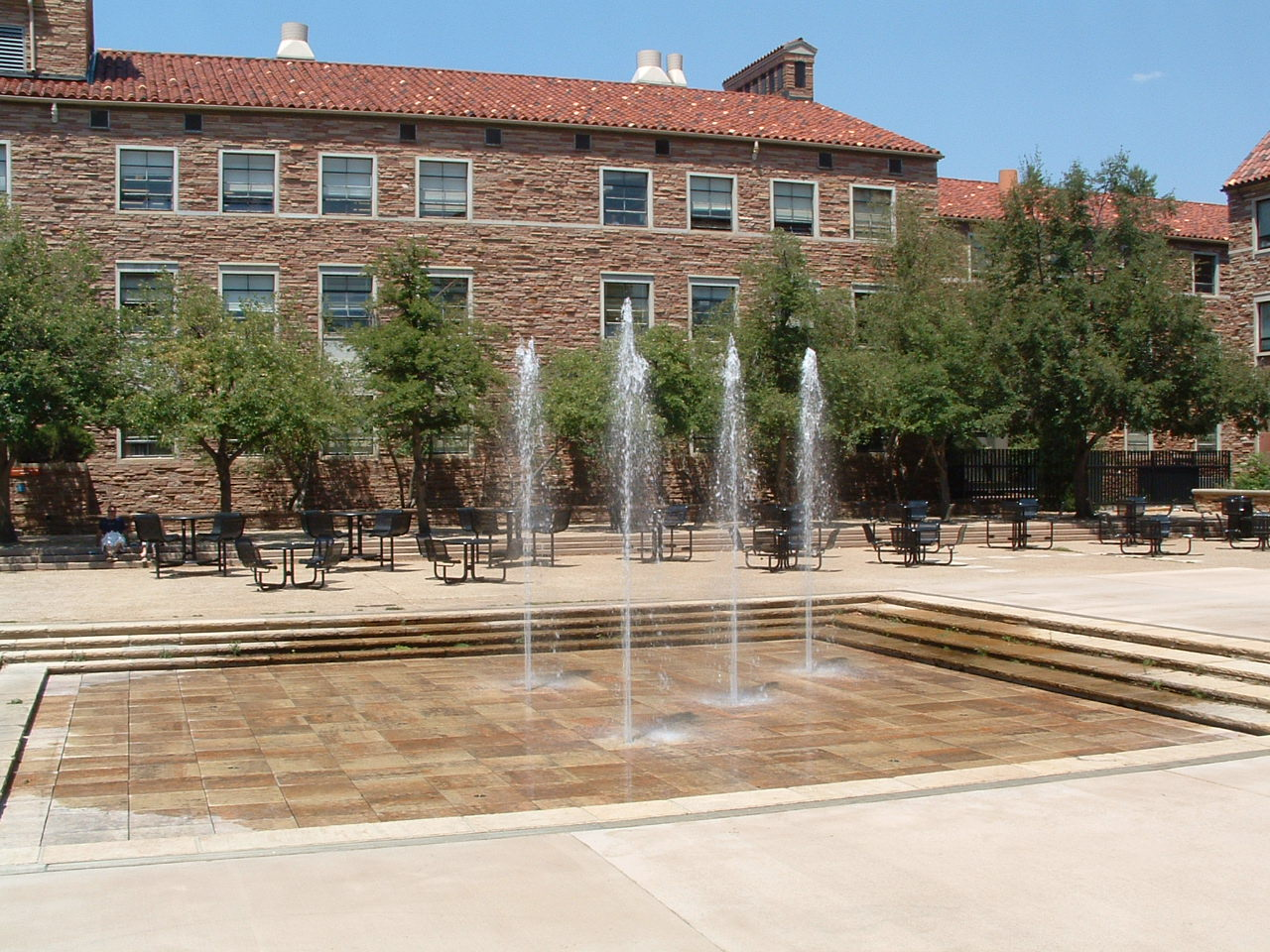
Dalton Trumbo Fountain Court behind the UMC on July 13, 2006

In 1947, Colorado Governor Lee Knous issued a proclamation to create a memorial to Colorado's servicemen at the University of Colorado Boulder. A proposal to house this memorial in a student union building resulted in a remarkable fundraising effort. The University Memorial Center (UMC) opened its doors in October 1953 with President Robert Stearns presiding over the ribbon-cutting ceremony. The UMC quickly became the central landmark of the Boulder campus. A 1964 addition created a new bookstore, conference facilities, additional dining facilities, and offices to house the rapidly growing student activities and organizations. The expansion was financed through bonds granted by student fees.

The 1960s and '70s put the UMC at the center of student activism as students staged strikes, grape boycotts, love-ins, sit-ins, and walk-outs. The UMC Fountain Court (now the Dalton Trumbo Fountain Court) became a familiar sight to network television news watchers as the famous and notorious promoted their cause at CU Boulder. Entertainers as diverse as Ramsey Lewis and the Grateful Dead have performed in the Glenn Miller Ballroom. The UMC Connection, a student entertainment center in the basement, is a more informal gathering place, featuring pool tables and a small bowling alley. It also features Club 156, which hosts concerts from local and up-and-coming bands. In 1986, students passed another bond issue to remodel the food services area. The Alferd Packer Grill gets its name from Alferd Packer, a Colorado prospector accused of cannibalism.

=== Center for Community ===
The Center for Community, also known as the C4C by students, follows the distinct architecture guidelines of Charles Klauder and is a 323,000-square-foot (30,000 m^{2}) facility that is promised to be 20 percent to 25 percent more energy- and water-efficient compared to similar-sized buildings. The facility was completed in September 2010 at a cost of $84.4 million. The building is originally bond-financed through the CU treasurer and will be repaid through a combination of sources. A large portion of the debt, $47.4 million, will be repaid by Housing and Dining Services through room and board fees. Fees from Permit and Parking Services will contribute as well. The center also relies on $18 million in donations, a goal which has not been achieved, but has become a top fundraising priority for the university.

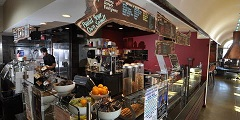
The Weather Tech Cafe

The building houses offices of Student Services, including Campus Card Services, Disability Services, and Career Services, among others. These services have been relocated to the C4C from various locations around campus. For example, Career Services was previously housed in the basement of the Willard Dormitory. There is a 140,000-square-foot (13,000 m^{2}) underground parking structure that contains approximately 365 to 375 parking spaces. Student study areas are located on the upper floors and conference centers are open to campus and non-campus affiliates throughout the building.

==== Dining services ====
The dining services offered within the C4C include a CU on the run "grab-n-go", The Bakery, a late-night dining hub called the Weather Tech Café, open until 2 A.M., and finally a central dining facility. This dining facility seats 900 and offers students up to nine specialty dining choices, including Persian, Asian, Latin, sushi, Italian, Kosher, a grill, salad bars, and desserts. Overall, the Dining Center is projected to serve around one million meals per year.

=== Recreation Center ===
In 1973 the student recreation center was built on the CU Boulder's main campus, by the architect James Wallace. The funding to build the recreation center came entirely from student fees, which also funded the expansions in 1990 and 2014. The recreation center features strength and cardio space, basketball/volleyball courts, the only ice rink in Boulder proper, lap pool, dive well, fitness studios (cycling, rowing, etc.), climbing gym, turf gym, and an iconic outdoor pool in the shape of the CU Boulder buffalo mascot. It is currently about 300,000 square feet (28,000 m^{2}) and operates on a $5 million annual budget. The center is co-managed by the Division of Student Affairs and CUSG, CU Boulder's student government. It is located on the northern edge of campus next to Folsom Field. It is open seven days a week and on average 16 hours a day, with most of its facilities available for use during those hours.

=== Mary Rippon Theatre ===
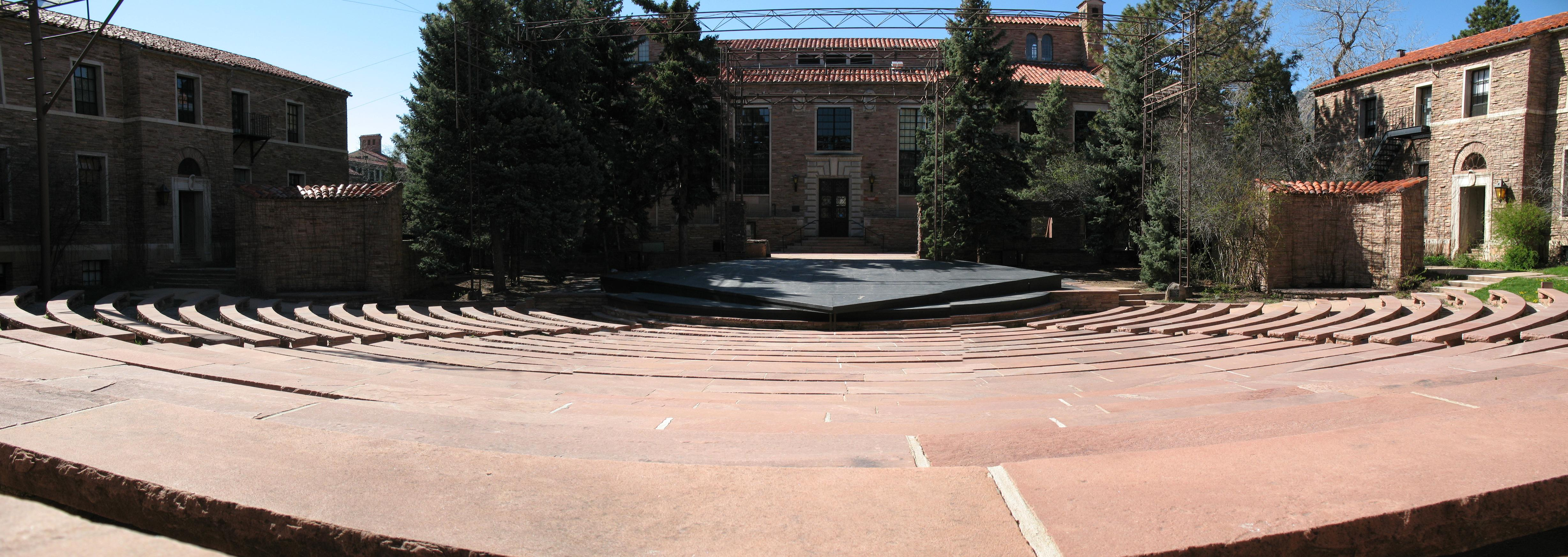
The view from the back of the Mary Rippon Theatre

The Mary Rippon Theatre is an outdoor theater and the site of many cultural events, notably the Colorado Shakespeare Festival. The Theatre was named after Professor Mary Rippon, the first female instructor at the university and one of the first female university instructors in the United States. She taught English grammar, German, French and mathematics.

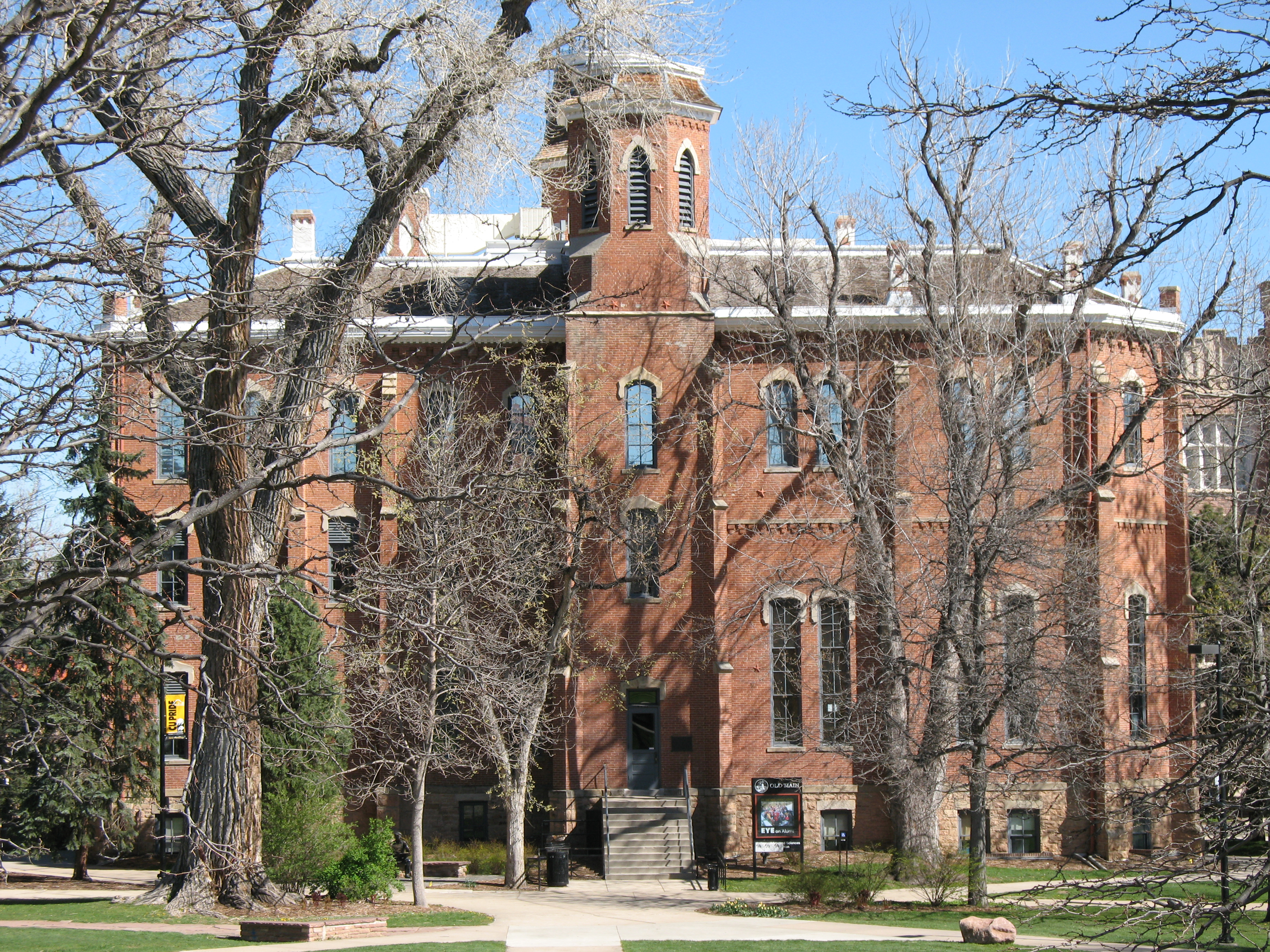
Old Main

=== Old Main ===
Old Main is the oldest building on campus, and previously served as the Medical School for the University of Colorado system.

=== Galleries ===
Norlin Library features two art galleries, several dedicated art spaces, and artworks on display throughout the building. The CU Art Museum features works of modern and contemporary art, as well as historical artworks. The Museum's permanent collection includes over 5,000 works of art from numerous time periods and cultures. The UMC Art Gallery exhibits a variety of visual offerings ranging from student works created on campus to presentations of internationally recognized artists. Andrew J. Macky Gallery showcases the work of both local and national artists and is housed in the historic Macky Auditorium.

=== Museums ===
University of Colorado Museum of Natural History has one of the most extensive natural history collections in the Rocky Mountain and Plains regions, representing the disciplines of anthropology, botany, entomology, paleontology, and zoology. It is located in the Henderson building, named after its first curator, Judge Junius Henderson, and hosts the Museum and Field Studies master's (MS) program. The CU Heritage Center tells the stories of CU Boulder's past and present and is housed in Old Main, the first building constructed on campus. Seven galleries exhibit art and memorabilia associated with CU faculty and alumni. The Fiske Planetarium and Science Center features a 60 ft (18 m). planetarium dome and produces laser shows, live concerts, and an ongoing series of public programs. Fiske also offers a hands-on science museum with interactive exhibits and space-themed art.

=== Performing arts facilities ===
The University of Colorado Boulder College of Music presents over 400 performances and educational events, bringing together faculty, students, and guest artists each year through the Pendulum New Music Series. They present musical genres including classical, jazz, world music, and new music. The University of Colorado Boulder Department of Theatre & Dance is home to the Charlotte York Irey Dance Theatre, the University Theatre, and the Loft Theatre, as well as Grusin Music Hall and the Chamber Music Hall in the College of Music. More than twenty productions are presented each year, featuring student and faculty actors, dancers, choreographers, directors, and designers, as well as the work of professional guest artists. Student work is also showcased in the annual CU Boulder Fringe Festival, produced by OnStage, a student performing arts group.

=== Visual Arts Complex ===
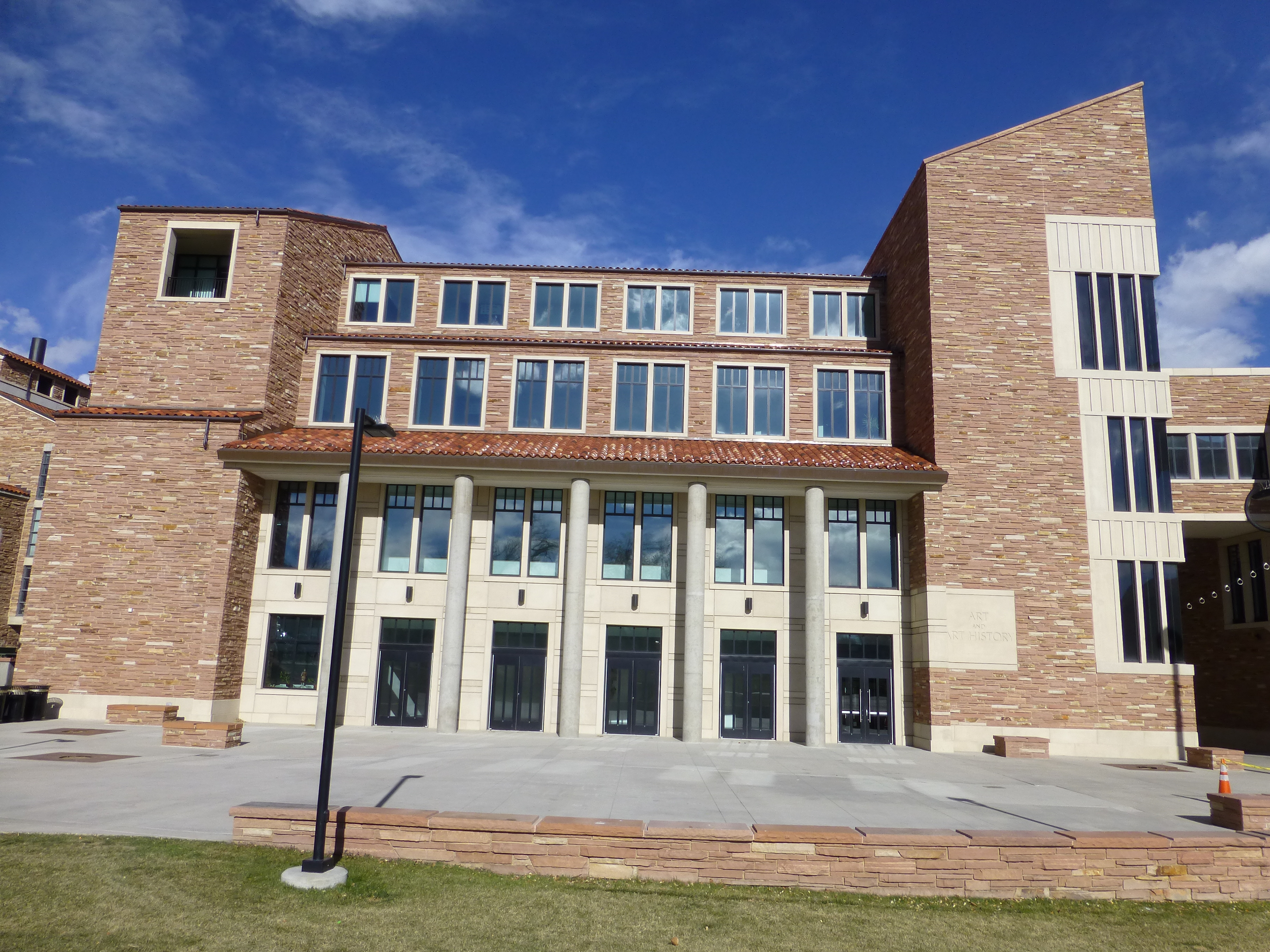
Visual Arts Complex

A new visual arts complex that houses the Department of Art and Art History and the CU Art Museum officially opened in 2010. The facility houses art programming and studies. The building also contains a 200-seat auditorium as well as twenty-eight student exhibition spaces, and the Colorado Collection (an art collection of approximately 5,000 pieces).

=== The Hill ===
The Hill, a college neighborhood in Boulder, lies directly west of the University of Colorado campus. The central street of the neighborhood is 13th Street, which features a variety of attractions including a concert venue and the Fox Theatre, and is near The Sink and several other points of interest.

== Undergraduate admissions ==
Undergraduate admissions statistics
- 2021 entering class
- Admit rate: 79.6 (▲ +3)
- Yield rate: 15.6 (▼ −9.1)

Test scores middle 50%
- SAT Total: 1180–1380 (among 32% of FTFs)
- ACT Composite: 25–31 (among 16% of FTFs)

The 2022 annual ranking of U.S. News & World Report categorizes CU Boulder as selective. For the Class of 2025 (enrolled fall 2021), CU Boulder received 54,756 applications and accepted 43,576 (79.6%). Of those accepted, 6,785 enrolled, a yield rate (the percentage of accepted students who choose to attend the university) of 15.6%. CU Boulder's freshman retention rate is 87%, with 74% going on to graduate within six years.

Of the 32% of the incoming freshman class who submitted SAT scores, the middle 50 percent Composite scores were 1180–1380. Of the 16% of enrolled freshmen in 2021 who submitted ACT scores; the middle 50 percent Composite score was between 25 and 31. In the 2020–2021 academic year, 8 freshman students were National Merit Scholars.

Fall first-time freshman statistics
	2021	2020	2019	2018	2017	2016
Applicants	54,756	44,171	40,740	36,604	36,149	34,047
Admits	43,576	37,189	31,933	29,848	28,861	26,087
Admit rate	79.6	84.2	78.4	81.5	79.8	76.6
Enrolled	6,785	6,326	7,113	6,700	6,570	6,439
Yield rate	15.6	17.0	22.3	22.4	22.8	24.7
ACT composite* (out of 36)	25–31 (16%^{†})	24–31 (45%^{†})	25–31 (47%^{†})	25–30 (53%^{†})	25–30 (81%^{†})	25–30 (79%^{†})
SAT composite* (out of 1600)	1180–1380 (32%^{†})	1140–1340 (73%^{†})	1150–1350 (72%^{†})	1160–1350 (70%^{†})	1150–1330 (35%^{†})	—
* middle 50% range^{†} percentage of first-time freshmen who chose to submit

== Academics ==
CU Boulder Colleges and Schools
College of Arts & Sciences
Leeds School of Business
School of Education
College of Engineering and Applied Science
Graduate School
University of Colorado Law School
College of Communication, Media, Design and Information
College of Music
Continuing Education and Professional Studies

The University of Colorado Boulder is divided into several colleges and schools. While the College of Arts and Sciences is by far the largest, the university also consists of the College of Engineering and Applied Science, the Program in Environmental Design, Education, Music, Law, the Leeds School of Business, and the College of Communication, Media, Design and Information. Most, if not all, of these colleges and schools also incorporate master's- and doctoral-level degree programs. At the university, there are currently approximately 3,400 courses available in over 150 disciplines, making up 85 majors ranging from Accounting to Women's Studies.

University of Colorado Law School is the smallest and most selective of the colleges. The Wolf Law Building, the new home of the Law School, was dedicated on September 8, 2006, by United States Supreme Court justice Stephen Breyer.

The Leeds School of Business has an enrollment of 3,300 students, including undergraduates, master's candidates, and Ph.D. candidates. The undergraduate program ranks 39th in the country and the undergraduate entrepreneurship program ranks 14th in the nation. The MBA program ranks 26th among all public universities. The faculty are ranked 38th in the nation according to the Academy of Management Journal.

CU Boulder adopted an honor code in 2000 following growing concerns about academic dishonesty on campus in the late 1990s. A copy of the code stating "On my honor, as a University of Colorado Boulder student, I have neither given nor received unauthorized assistance on this work" is engraved on a metal plate and posted in every classroom on campus.

Undergraduates who seek an academic challenge may participate in CU's Honors Program. Begun in 1931, the Honors Program currently consists of the top ten percent of incoming freshmen and participating undergraduates with a 3.3 GPA or greater (on a 4.0 scale). The program offers over 40 honors classes each semester, taught by tenured or tenure-track professors and limited to class sizes of 17 students. Honors students also have the opportunity to graduate with honors, high honors, and highest honors by writing and defending a thesis during their senior year. The program extends into the residence halls through the Kittredge Honors Program. The Presidents Leadership Class is a program for top scholars at the University of Colorado Boulder. Scholars participate in a four-year leadership development program. The program provides opportunities to the top fifty students at CU from every major and discipline.

One option for students (mostly freshmen and sophomores) living on campus is to join a residential academic program (RAP). Each RAP focuses on a curricular theme and offers courses in the residence hall itself. The programs also include educational activities.

=== Rankings ===
Academic rankings

National
- Forbes: 93
- U.S. News & World Report: 97 (tie)
- Washington Monthly: 109
- WSJ/College Pulse: 238

Global
- ARWU: 62
- QS: 299
- THE: 159
- U.S. News & World Report: 107 (tie)

U.S. News & World Report ranked the University of Colorado Boulder tied for 97th best among all national universities, tied for 46th among public universities in the U.S., and tied for 107th best among all universities globally for 2025.

=== Faculty ===
As of 2006, there were more than 3,800 tenured or tenure-eligible faculty members, as well as 4,400 non-tenured adjunct professors and instructors. Current faculty include Nobel laureates David J. Wineland (physics 2012), John Hall (physics, 2005), Eric Cornell (physics, 2001), and Thomas Robert Cech (chemistry, 1989). Carl Wieman was also awarded a Nobel prize for his work with Eric Cornell. He maintains a part-time appointment at the University of Colorado Boulder, but his primary appointment is Professor and Director of the Carl Wieman Science Education Initiative at the University of British Columbia. Controversial writer Ward Churchill was a professor of ethnic studies until he was terminated in July 2007. Robert T. Craig an International Communication Association Fellow and author of "Communication Theory as a Field" is a professor in the Communication Department. Teaching Professor of Distinction Michael Dubson is the associate chair of the physics department and Author of Modern Physics, 2nd edition. Professor Emerita Susan Kingsley Kent is the Chair of the Department of Religious Studies.

=== Center for Advanced Engineering and Technology Education ===
The Center for Advanced Engineering and Technology Education (CAETE) is a partnership between the College of Engineering and Applied Science and the Division of Continuing Education and Professional Studies at the University of Colorado Boulder. As the distance learning and professional studies arm of the College of Engineering and Applied Science, CAETE provides courses from the college to working professionals via the Internet and CD-ROM. Students can take courses for professional development or toward earning a master's degree or graduate certificate (in some disciplines) in aerospace engineering, computer science, electrical, computer and energy engineering, engineering management, and telecommunications. Founded in 1983, CAETE currently receives over 1,000 enrollments a year from over 250 job sites in Colorado, across the nation, and abroad.

=== University of Colorado Engineering Management Program ===
The University of Colorado Engineering Management Program (formerly the Lockheed Martin Engineering Management Program) is a graduate and undergraduate-level initiative within the College of Engineering and Applied Science at the University of Colorado Boulder. The program equips experienced engineers and technical professionals with management, leadership, and project‑planning capabilities to advance into mid-career leadership roles. It offers a Master of Engineering in Engineering Management, a minor and graduate certificates on-campus, evening, and fully online via Coursera. It was initiated in 1987 with an endowment from Lockheed Martin to meet the needs of the high-tech industry in Colorado.

=== Media ===
The CU Independent is the award-winning, student-run news publication for the University of Colorado Boulder. It has been digital-only since August 2006, one of the first major college newspapers to drop its print edition. It was founded in 1978 as the Working Press but soon adopted the name Campus Press. It was launched by Mal Deans, a CU journalism instructor, to serve as a student-run newspaper after the Colorado Daily left campus and became a community newspaper. The name was changed to the CU Independent in August 2008 after it split from the journalism school's curriculum in the wake of a controversy over a student journalist's racially charged column. In December 2019, the university's media college, which had been providing space and retaining staff pay, announced it would defund the CU Independent in favor of a faculty-led media enterprise. Staff of the CU Independent said they would continue to maintain the website and publish content under a new funding model separate from the college.

1000-Word Philosophy is a philosophy blog that publishes introductory 1000-word (or less) essays on philosophical topics. Most of the authors are students and graduates of CU Boulder. The blog is created and edited by Andrew D. Chapman, a philosophy lecturer at this university. The essays generally include references or sources for more information.

What's Wrong? is the "not quite official" blog of the University of Colorado, Boulder's Center for Values and Social Policy. The blog's purpose is to provide "a forum for discussing and reporting on topics in applied normative philosophy".

=== Research institutes ===
CU Boulder's research mission is supported by 11 research institutes within the university. Each research institute supports faculty from multiple academic departments, allowing institutes to conduct truly multidisciplinary research.

The Institute for Behavioral Genetics (IBG) is a research institute within the Graduate School dedicated to conducting and facilitating research on the genetic and environmental bases of individual differences in behavior. After its founding in 1967 IBG led the resurging interest in genetic influences on behavior. IBG was the first post-World War II research institute dedicated to research in behavioral genetics. IBG remains one of the top research facilities for research in behavioral genetics, including human behavioral genetics, psychiatric genetics, quantitative genetics, statistical genetics, and animal behavioral genetics.

The Institute of Cognitive Science (ICS) at CU Boulder promotes interdisciplinary research and training in cognitive science. ICS is highly interdisciplinary; its research focuses on education, language processing, emotion, and higher-level cognition using experimental methods. It is home to a state-of-the-art fMRI system used to collect neuroimaging data.

ATLAS Institute is a center for interdisciplinary research and academic study, where engineering, computer science and robotics are blended with design-oriented topics. Part of CU Boulder's College of Engineering and Applied Science, the institute offers academic programs at the undergraduate, master's and doctoral levels, and administers research labs, hacker and makerspaces, and a black box experimental performance studio. At the beginning of the 2018–2019 academic year, approximately 1,200 students were enrolled in ATLAS academic programs and the institute sponsored six research labs.

In addition to IBG, ICS and ATLAS, the university's other institutes include Biofrontiers Institute, Cooperative Institute for Research in Environmental Sciences, Institute of Arctic & Alpine Research (INSTAAR), Institute of Behavioral Science (IBS), CU Boulder-NIST joint institute JILA, Laboratory for Atmospheric & Space Physics (LASP), Renewable & Sustainable Energy Institute (RASEI), and the University of Colorado Museum of Natural History.

== Campus organizations ==
Undergraduate demographics as of Fall 2023
Race and ethnicity	Total
White	68%
Hispanic	13%
Two or more races	7%
Asian	6%
International student	3%
Black	2%
Unknown	1%
Economic diversity
Low-income (Note: The percentage of students who received an income-based federal Pell grant intended for low-income students.)	15%
Affluent (Note: The percentage of students who are a part of the American middle class at the bare minimum.)	85%

=== The University of Colorado Student Government ===
The University of Colorado Student Government (CUSG) is the student government for the University of Colorado Boulder. The government contains three branches: executive, legislative, and judicial. Presiding officers for the student government are elected in a biannual vote administered to the 30,000 students at the university. The student government has an autonomy agreement with the University Administration and oversees an annual budget of $36.6 million. CUSG is responsible for the management of the University Student Union, the Recreation Center, the LGBTQ Resource Center, the Women's Resource Center, and the Wardenburg Health Center, along with various other facilities on campus. The government also oversees the fiscal appropriations of over 120 student groups on a yearly basis.

=== CU Gaming and Esports ===
Founded in December 2015, CU Gaming is the University of Colorado's largest student organization with over 3,500 current members. The organization offers biweekly and monthly gaming events for its members as well as the general student population at CU. CU Gaming offers leadership, career, and internship opportunities for members who are interested in working in the gaming and esports industries.

CU Esports, CU Gaming's sister organization, fields over a dozen teams in a variety of games. In November 2020, CU Esports' Valorant Black Team was crowned the Collegiate Valorant Conference Fall 2020 Series Champions after defeating UCF Esports 2–1 in the finals.

=== Hiking Club ===
Founded in May 1919, the Hiking Club is the longest running student organization at the University of Colorado Boulder. It is a non-profit, student-run organization for university students and affiliates interested in hiking and outdoors activities, with hundreds of active members on campus.

The club motto, "half mile more," dates back to the 1940s of the club's tradition-rich history. A slide show of the club's activities is shown on campus during semi-annual new member meetings and the alumni association meets annually.

=== Radio 1190 ===
KVCU AM-1190, popularly known as Radio 1190, is a college radio station affiliated with the University of Colorado Boulder. Staff of the station are compensated with funds provided by the University of Colorado Student Government, while operating funds are raised during biannual on-air pledge drives. It is also run by volunteers from the journalism program.

=== Boulder Freeride ===
Boulder Freeride is the ski and snowboard club at the University of Colorado Boulder. It was started in 1933. Boulder Freeride is active year-round. Boulder Freeride organizes a number of ski trips each year. Past trips have included Jackson, WY, Innsbruck, Austria, Whistler, BC and Chamonix, France.

=== CU Cycling Club ===
Founded in 1983 by Jim Castagneri, the cycling team was taken to the national championships in 1987 by 1992 Olympian John Stenner. The CU cycling team frequently ranks in the top five USA Cycling Collegiate teams in both road cycling and mountain biking disciplines. They have won the national championship on several occasions, including 2005, when they won in both disciplines. Many members of the club have gone on into professional cycling, including Sepp Kuss and Tyler Hamilton.

A founding club member of the Rocky Mountain Collegiate Cycling Conference, the team is open to any student who pays annual dues and meets a minimum number of credits during the semester. The members include nearly every different type of cyclist, from BMX riders, trials, and bicycle commuters to elite amateur or part-time professional road and mountain riders. Specifically, to qualify for road or mountain nationals, a rider must have enough high race results to upgrade to "A" category in the USA Cycling rankings. A number of "A" riders will be chosen by the coaches to represent CU at the National Championships. The number of riders the team is allowed to send is based on how well the team did overall during the season.

=== Program Council ===
Established in 1953, Program Council is a student-run group that coordinates concerts and movies played on campus throughout the year. Program Council mainly focuses on organizing concerts around campus. Over the years, this group has brought such acts as The Rolling Stones, The Who, Dave Matthews Band, Pearl Jam, R.E.M., The Ramones, Henry Rollins, and many more to the University of Colorado. Concerts vary in size, ranging from large-scale concerts to smaller local acts, some of which are free to attend. Besides concerts, Program Council also hosts a film series throughout the year, which allows students to see soon-to-be-released movies as well as cult classics for free in one of the large lecture halls on campus.

=== The Herd ===
The Herd is one of the largest student alumni groups in the nation, with over 6,000 members. The Herd's main goal is to increase school spirit. It encourages students to attend school activities such as sports games and club meetings. The Herd also sponsors discounted bus rides to the ski slopes, discounts around Boulder, and football pre-game parties. Sixteen student leaders run the group; the group is open to currently enrolled students.

=== Volunteer Resource Center ===
The Volunteer Resource Center is a student-funded organization aimed at promoting volunteerism in the Boulder community. They provide a database with volunteer opportunities of 250 organizations around campus and in the Boulder area. The CU Boulder campus was recently one of 3 U.S. Universities to receive the Presidential Award for Exemplary Student Community Service in 2008. The Volunteer Resource Center hosts or participates in special volunteer events and activities, including Alternative Breaks, Better Boulder Better World, and The Buffalo Can Challenge. The Volunteer Resource Center is also a yearly Volunteer Internship Program, which engages six selected students through an interview process to create events aimed at involving more freshmen in volunteering, effectively managing all logistics of the event, and implementing the events on campus.

=== Greek life ===
The Panhellenic sorority community consists of roughly a dozen chapters. The men's fraternities at the University of Colorado are not officially affiliated with the school; however, they are still a presence on campus. About 13% of the undergraduate student body participates in Greek life. The Multicultural Greek Council acts as a liaison between the member organizations and university administration.

The death of Chi Psi pledge Gordie Bailey from alcohol poisoning during hazing in 2004 caused Boulder fraternities to reorganize and sever legal affiliation to the university. Students gathered for a candlelight vigil for the deceased football player on the Boulder campus on September 20, 2004.

=== Left Right TIM Improv Comedy ===
Started in 2008 by CU-Boulder students, Left Right TIM is the Boulder area's premier and longest-running improv comedy team. The team has performed in cities around the country as well as opening for established stand-up comedians and improv theaters.

== Sports, clubs, and traditions ==
Sports teams at the school are called Buffaloes. The varsity athletic teams participate in the NCAA's Division I (FBS for football, see Bowl Championship Series) as a member of the Big 12 Conference. The school rejoined the Big 12 in 2024, ending its affiliation with the Pac-12 Conference. (CU had previously been a member of the former Big Eight Conference, whose members had merged with four schools of the former Southwest Conference to create the new Big 12 Conference in 1996.) The official school colors are silver and gold, as opposed to the common belief of black and gold. Silver and gold were chosen to represent the state's mineral wealth, but the colors did not look good together on the uniforms, so black was substituted. There are three official fight songs: "Glory Colorado", "Go Colorado", and "Fight CU." In the early 1980s, the Board of Regents changed the school colors to sky blue and gold; but the changed proved highly unpopular with students and alumni, and the colors were changed back after 1985.

In 1934, the university teams were officially nicknamed the "Buffaloes." Previous nicknames used by the press included the "Silver Helmets" and "Frontiersmen." The final game of 1934, against the University of Denver, saw the first running of a buffalo in a Colorado football game. A buffalo calf was rented from a local ranch and ran along the sidelines.

=== Varsity athletics ===
CU's varsity teams have won national championships in skiing, men's cross country, women's cross country, and football. Conference championships have also been won in several sports. Several club sports, such as cycling, swimming & diving, and triathlon, have won national championships in addition to the varsity teams.

In football, CU enjoys an in-state rivalry with the Colorado State Rams in the "Rocky Mountain Showdown", a game that was formerly played at the neutral site Empower Field at Mile High in Denver. Additionally, Colorado and former Big Eight and Big 12 rival Nebraska Cornhuskers have played some notable games, often finishing their respective seasons in nationally televised confrontations on the Friday following Thanksgiving since the 1990s. This ended after the 2010 season as a result of CU joining the Pac-12 and Nebraska joining the Big Ten Conference. The team has seen renewed success since 2023 with former NFL star Deion Sanders as head coach.

=== Club sports ===
CU also maintains one of the largest club sports departments in the U.S. It supports over 30 club teams with leading clubs such as both men's and women's water polo, crew, cycling, ultimate, swimming & diving, fencing, men's lacrosse, baseball, softball, ice hockey, rugby union, and the CU Triathlon Team.

=== Mascot and spirit program ===
CU also includes a spirit program. The spirit program consists of three teams: two cheerleading squads and the CU Express Dance Team. The cheerleading program consists of a competitive co-ed squad as well as a competitive all-girl squad. Both the cheerleading squad and the Express Dance Team compete at NCA/NDA College Nationals. In 2007, the cheerleading squad finished sixth at NCA Nationals in Daytona Beach, Florida. All squads support the home games of football, Women's Basketball, Men's Basketball, and Women's Volleyball teams, along with other athletic and social events.

The school's live mascot is a female American bison named Ralphie. The costumed mascot CHIP is also a part of the CU Spirit Program. CHIP is a costumed buffalo that represents the University of Colorado at numerous athletic and social events. Along with the Cheer and Dance Program, CHIP competes on a national level once a year against mascots from around the country, including Bucky Badger, Sparty, Aubie, Goldy Gopher and many other Hall of Fame mascots. Most recently, CHIP competed in the 2009 UCA national competition and was crowned #1 and the national champion after performing a skit titled "CHIP's Favorite Video Games".

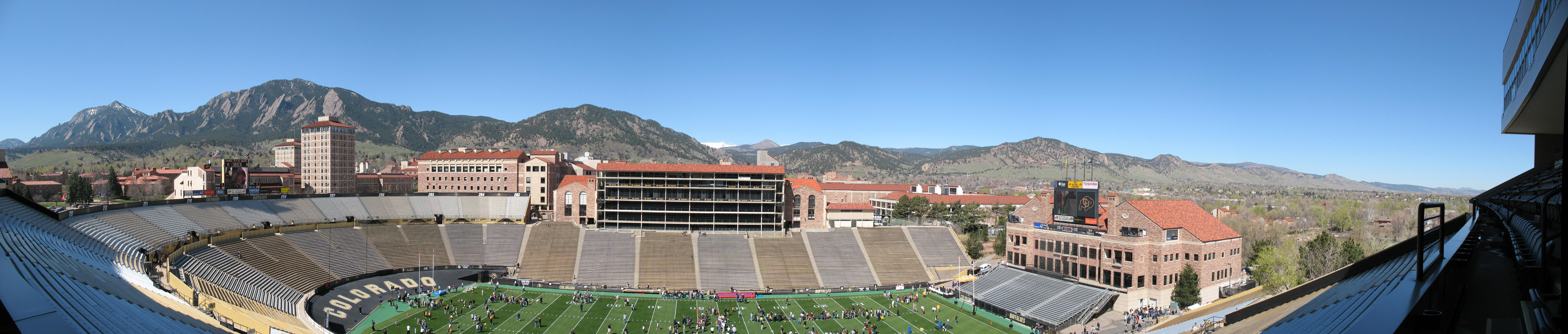
Folsom Field

=== Clubs and other organizations ===
CU Boulder offers a variety of political student organizations that cover the full spectrum of politics. Among them are Amnesty International, which focuses on human rights worldwide, Model United Nations (MUN), which simulates the UN with a focus on international relations and diplomacy, as well as the College Democrats and the College Republicans. The University of Colorado also offers many clubs promoting diversity and human rights, such as the Gay Straight Alliance. Students can also choose from a plethora of clubs and organizations centered on ethnicities and countries, as well as different religious groups. CU Boulder also maintains one of the nation's most competitive student-run parliamentary debate programs. In 2010, CU Boulder became the first fully student-run program to win the National Parliamentary Tournament of Excellence (NPTE).

== Demographics ==
As of fall 2021, there were 35,897 students enrolled. 66.2 percent of the student population identified as white. 56.9% were Colorado residents and 10.1% were California residents. A 2014 survey found that 16.3% of the students were registered as members of the Republican Party, along with 10.5% of CU Boulder non-faculty staff and 6% of CU Boulder faculty.

== Notable alumni ==
The University of Colorado Boulder ranks fourth among U.S. universities in the number of astronauts produced, not including military academies. In addition, the University of Colorado Boulder has graduated two heads of state, Mongolian president Tsakhiagiin Elbegdorj and Liberian president Ellen Johnson Sirleaf, and two associate justices of the Supreme Court of the United States, Wiley Rutledge and Byron White. Japanese-American astronaut Ellison Onizuka and Indian-American astronaut Kalpana Chawla are also alumni.

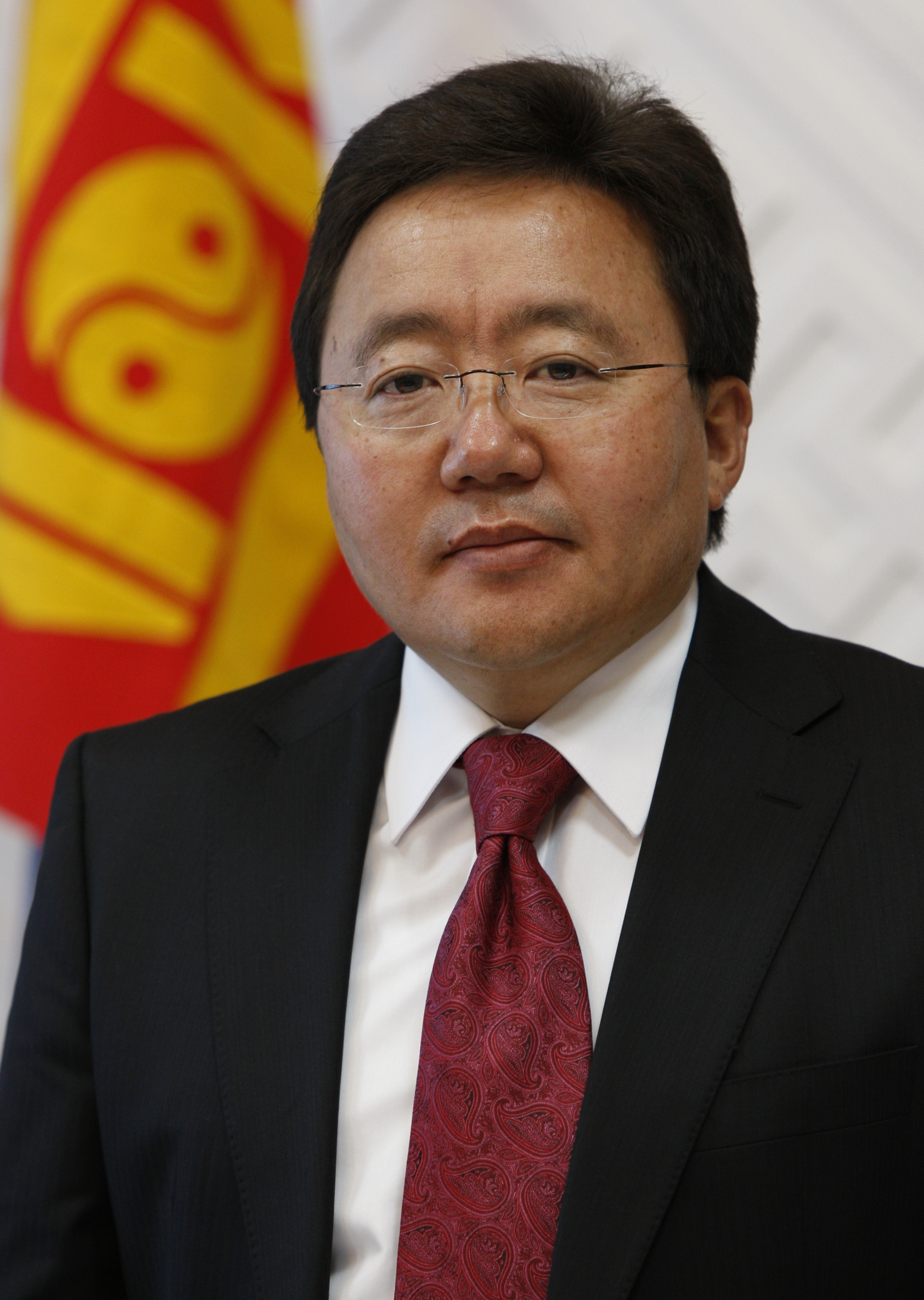
Mongolian President and Prime Minister Tsakhiagiin Elbegdorj

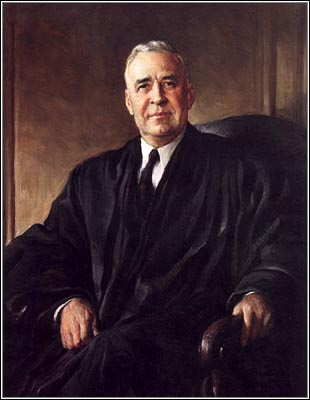
Associate Justice of Supreme Court Wiley Rutledge (LL.B. 1922)

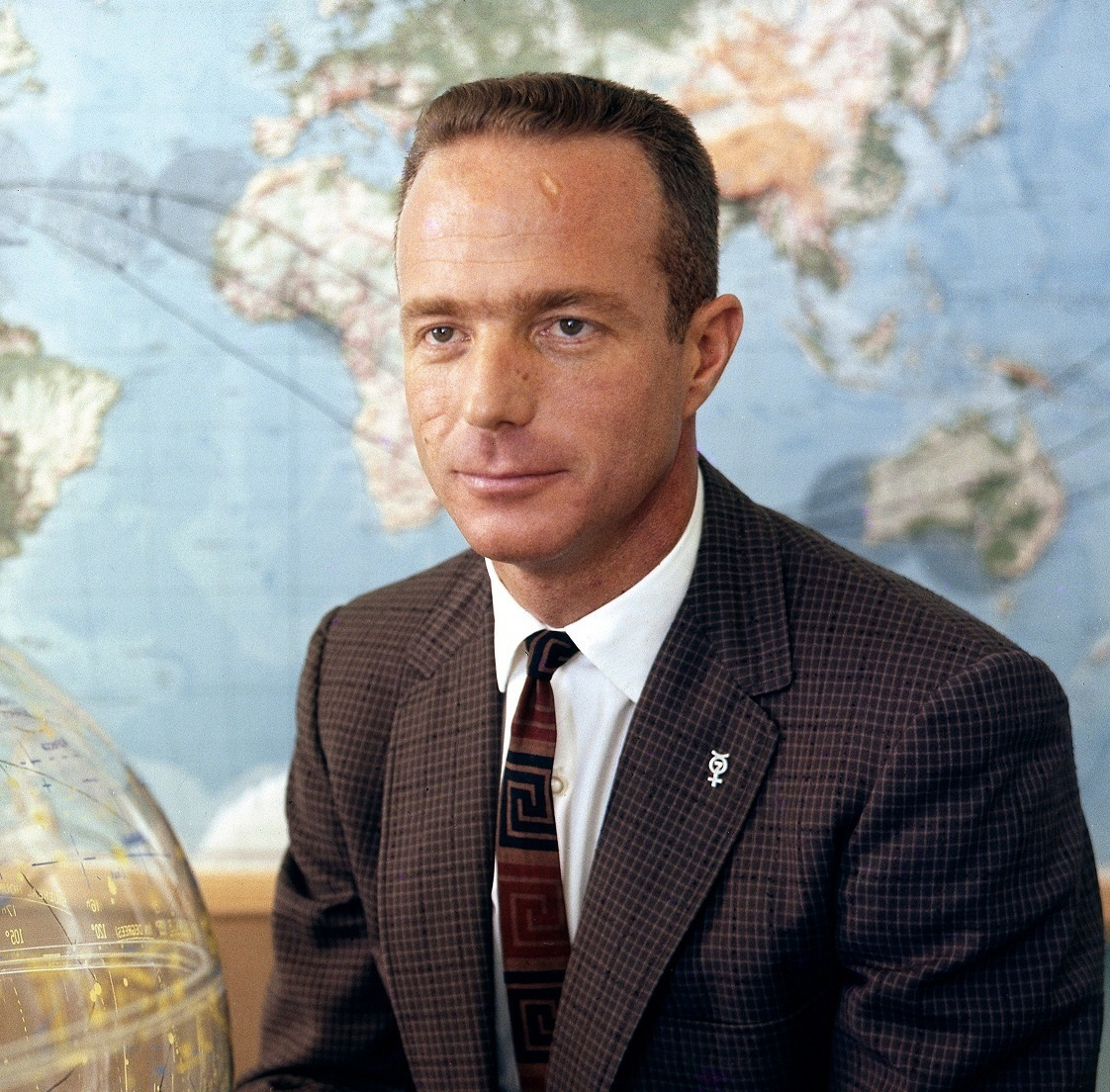
Astronaut Scott Carpenter (BS 1962)

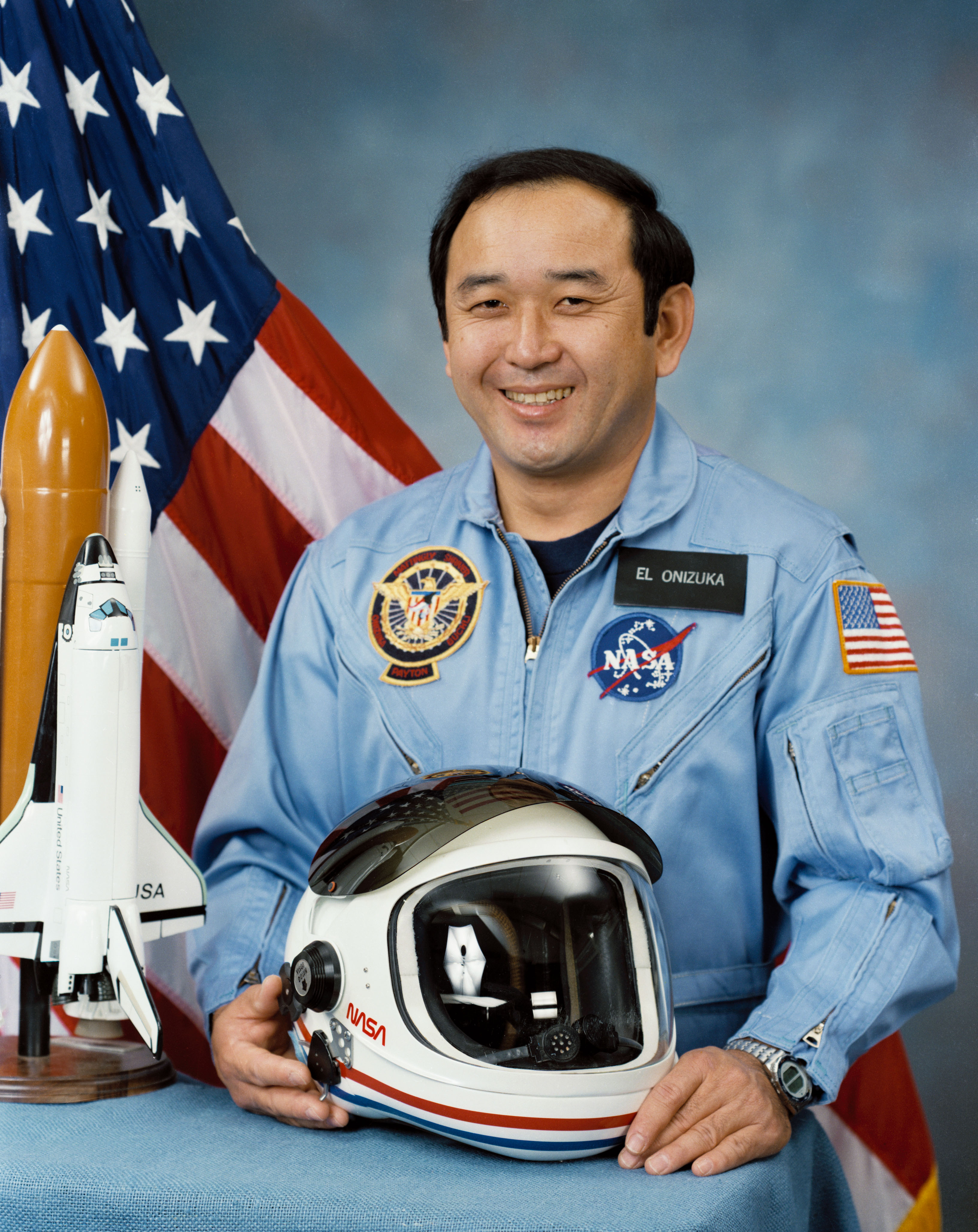
Astronaut Ellison Onizuka (BS & MS 1969)

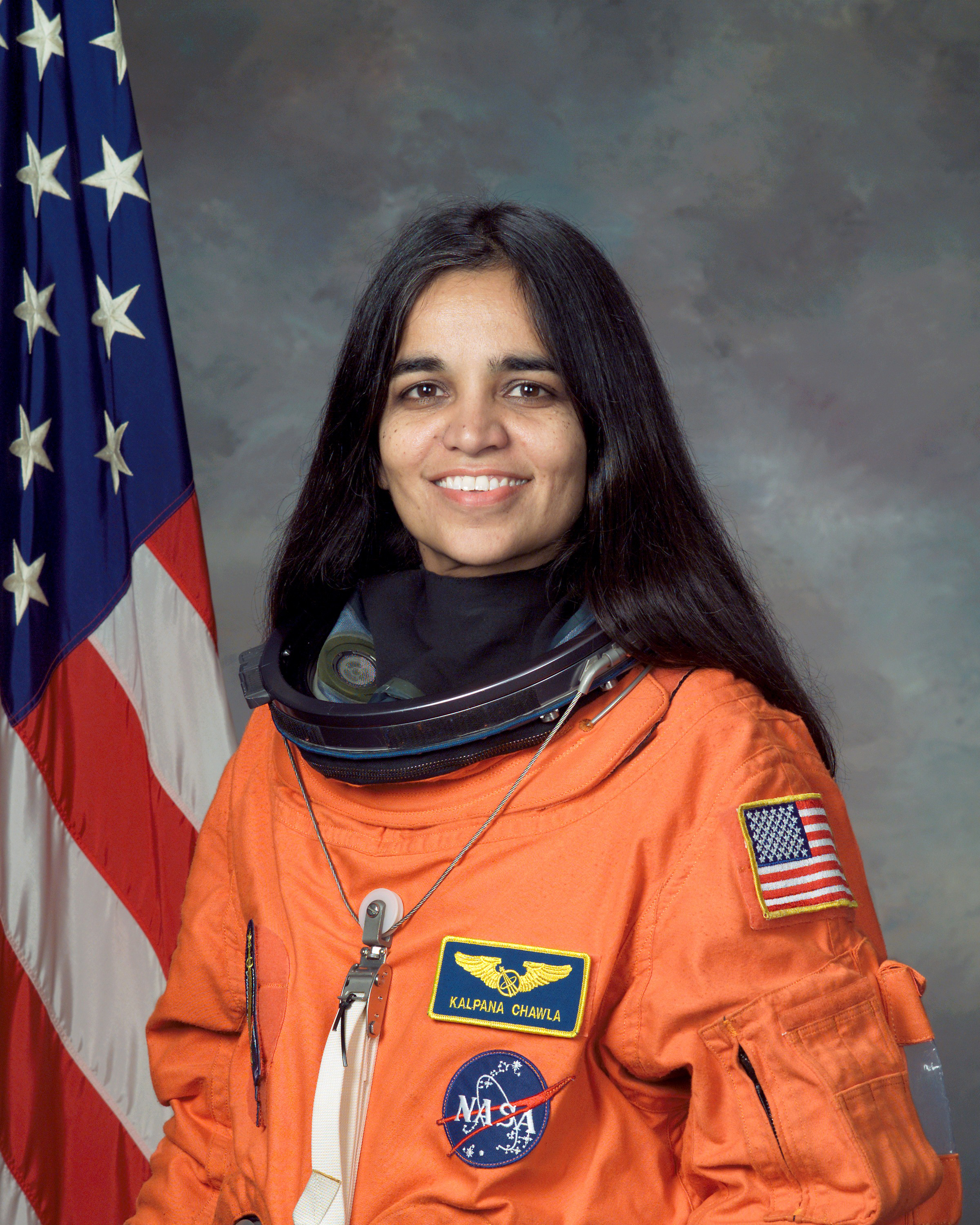
Astronaut Kalpana Chawla (MS 1986 & PhD 1988)

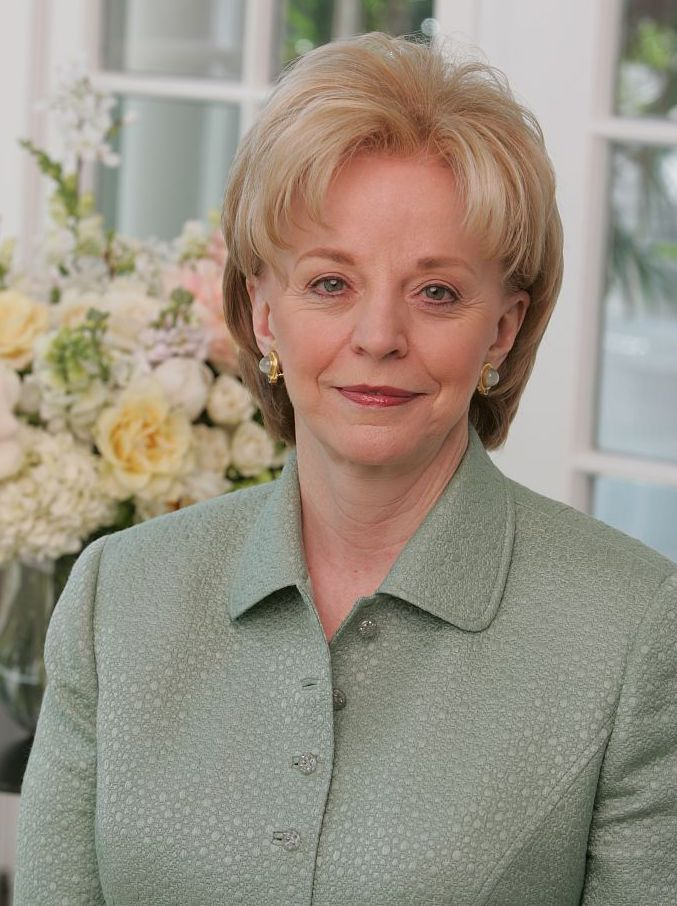
Former Second Lady of the United States Lynne Cheney (MA)

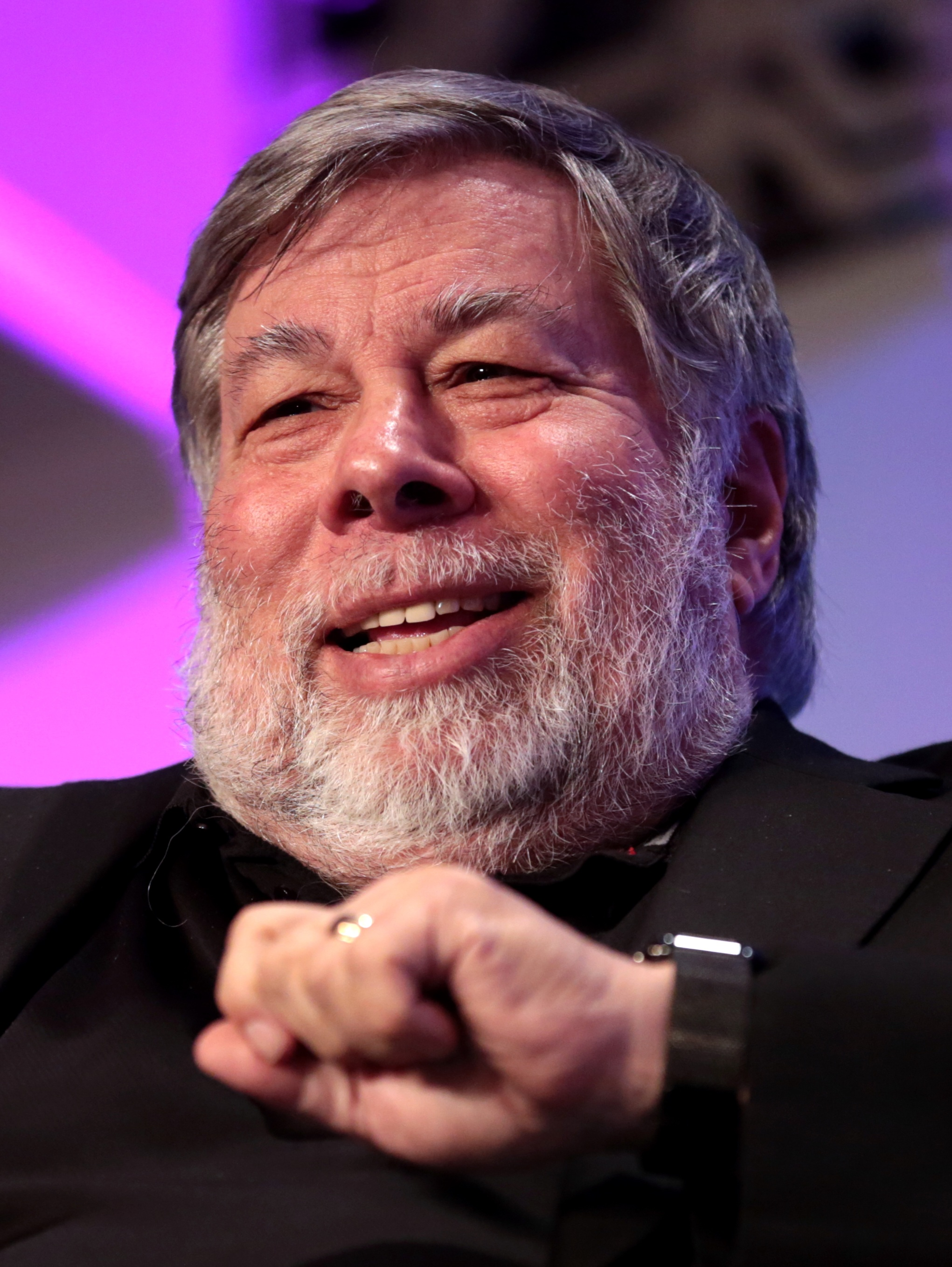
Co-founder of Apple Steve Wozniak

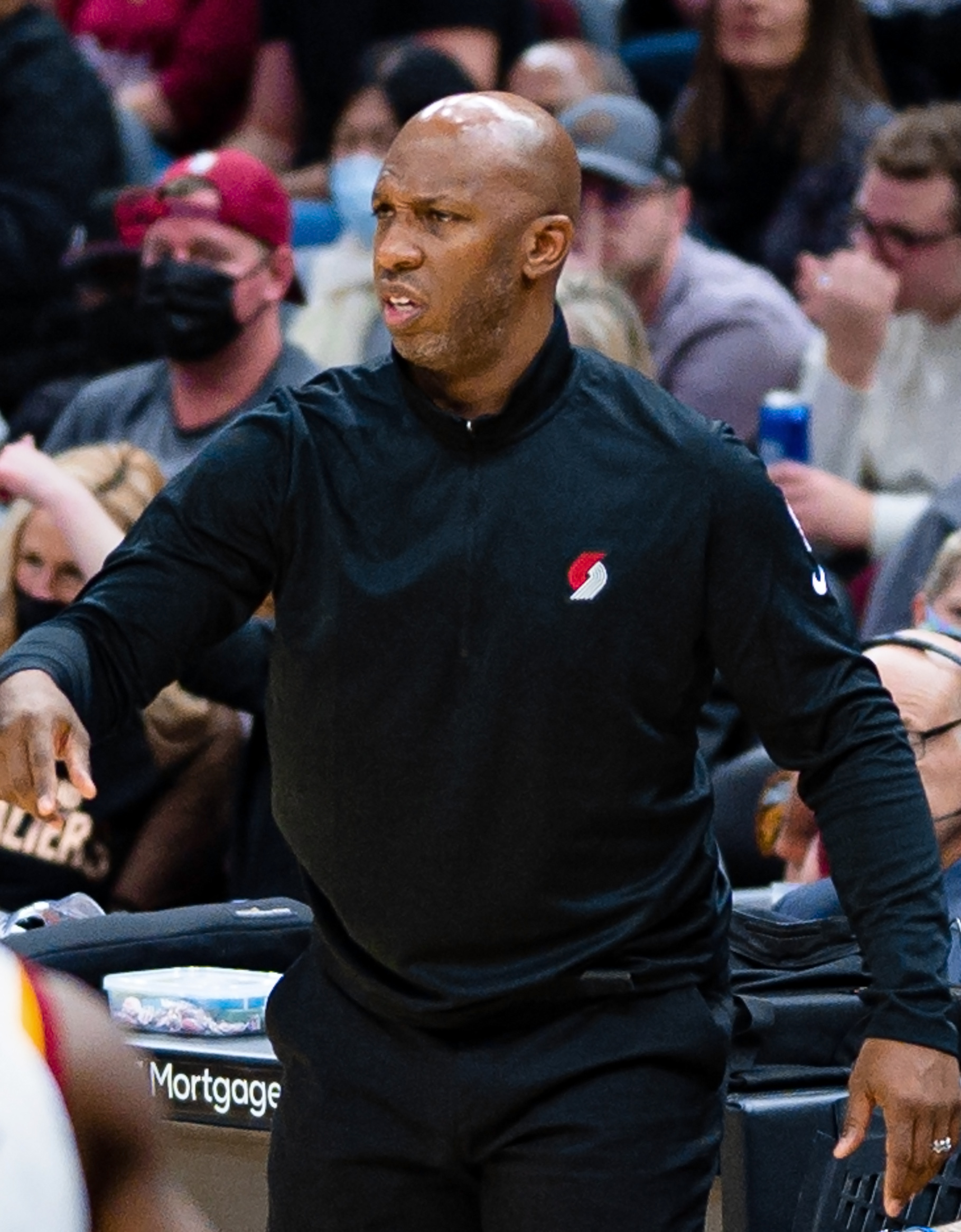
NBA player and coach Chauncey Billups

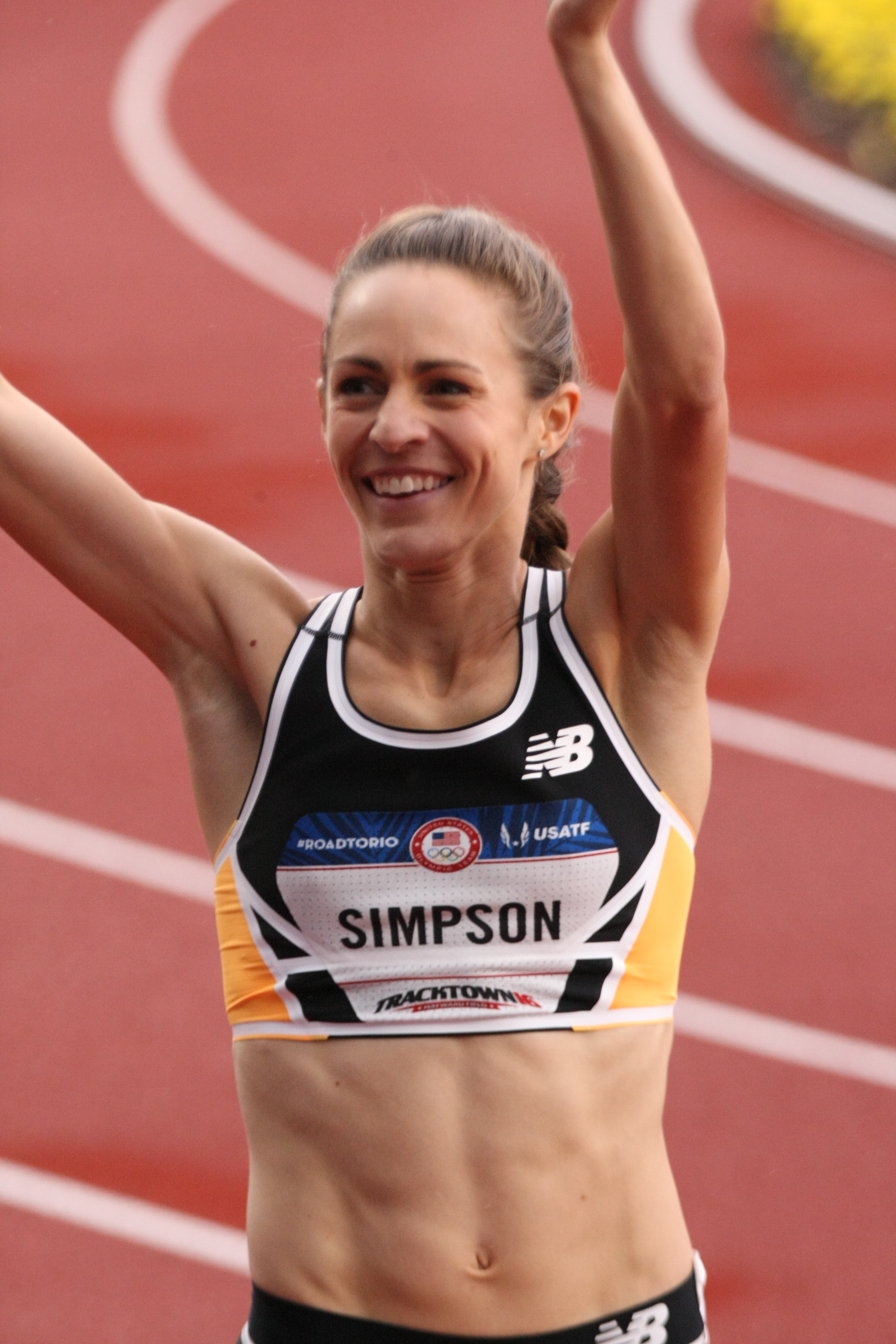
Olympic bronze medal Jenny Simpson (BFA 1992)

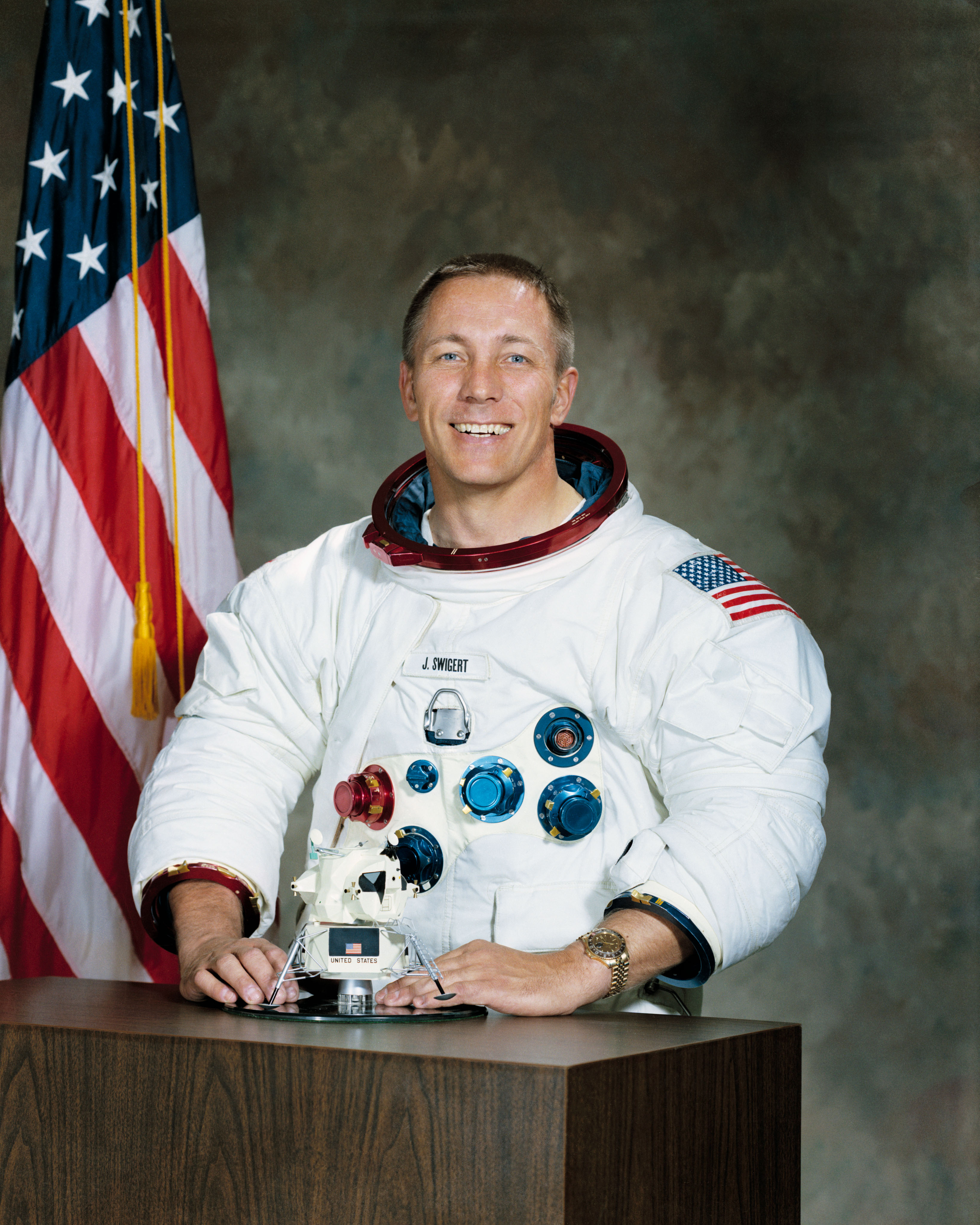
Astronaut Jack Swigert (BS 1953)

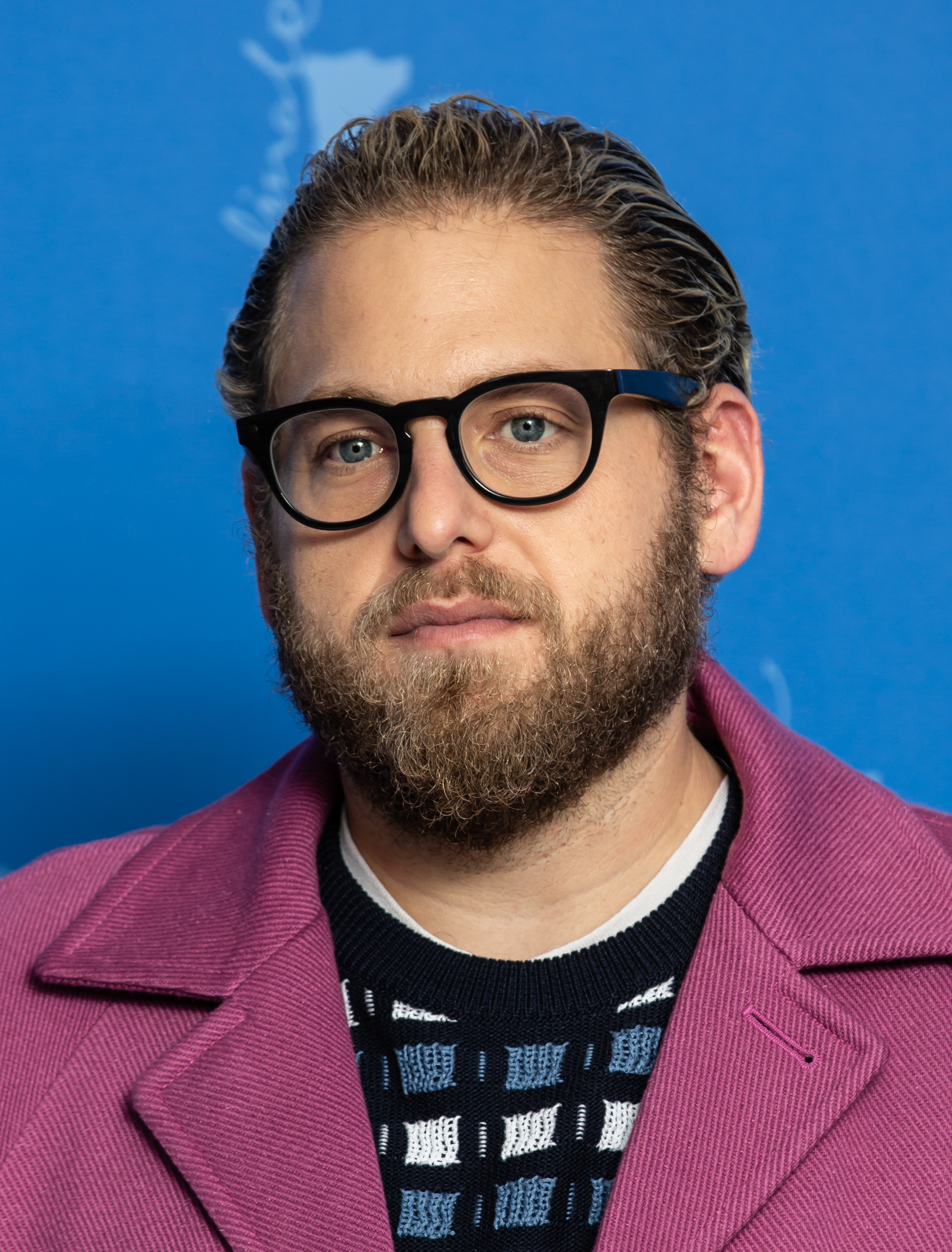
Actor Jonah Hill

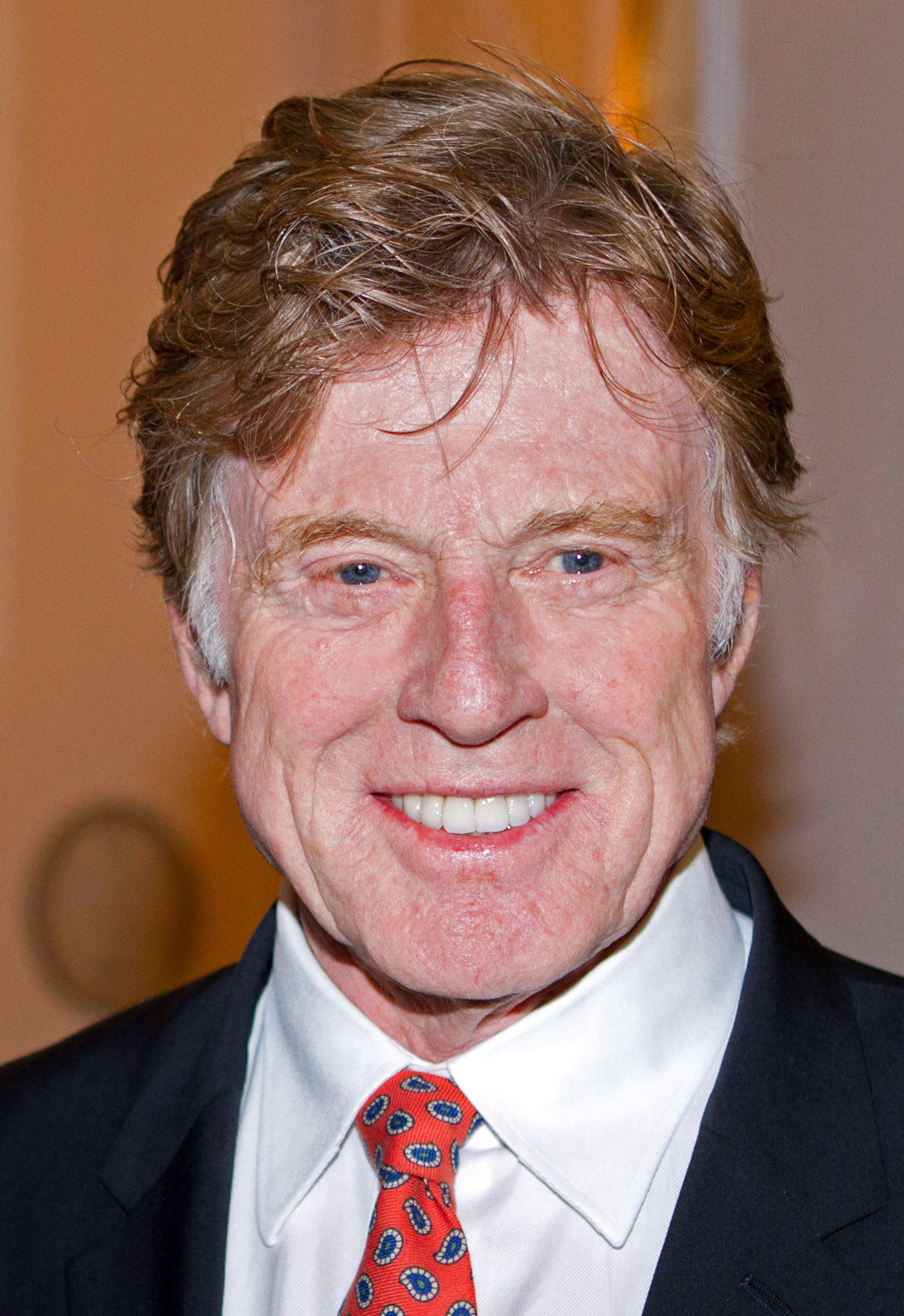
Actor and filmmaker Robert Redford

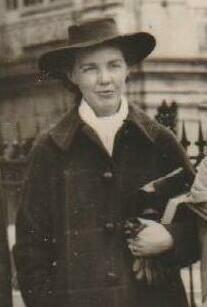
Jean Stafford, Pulitzer Prize winner for The Collected Stories of Jean Stafford (1970)

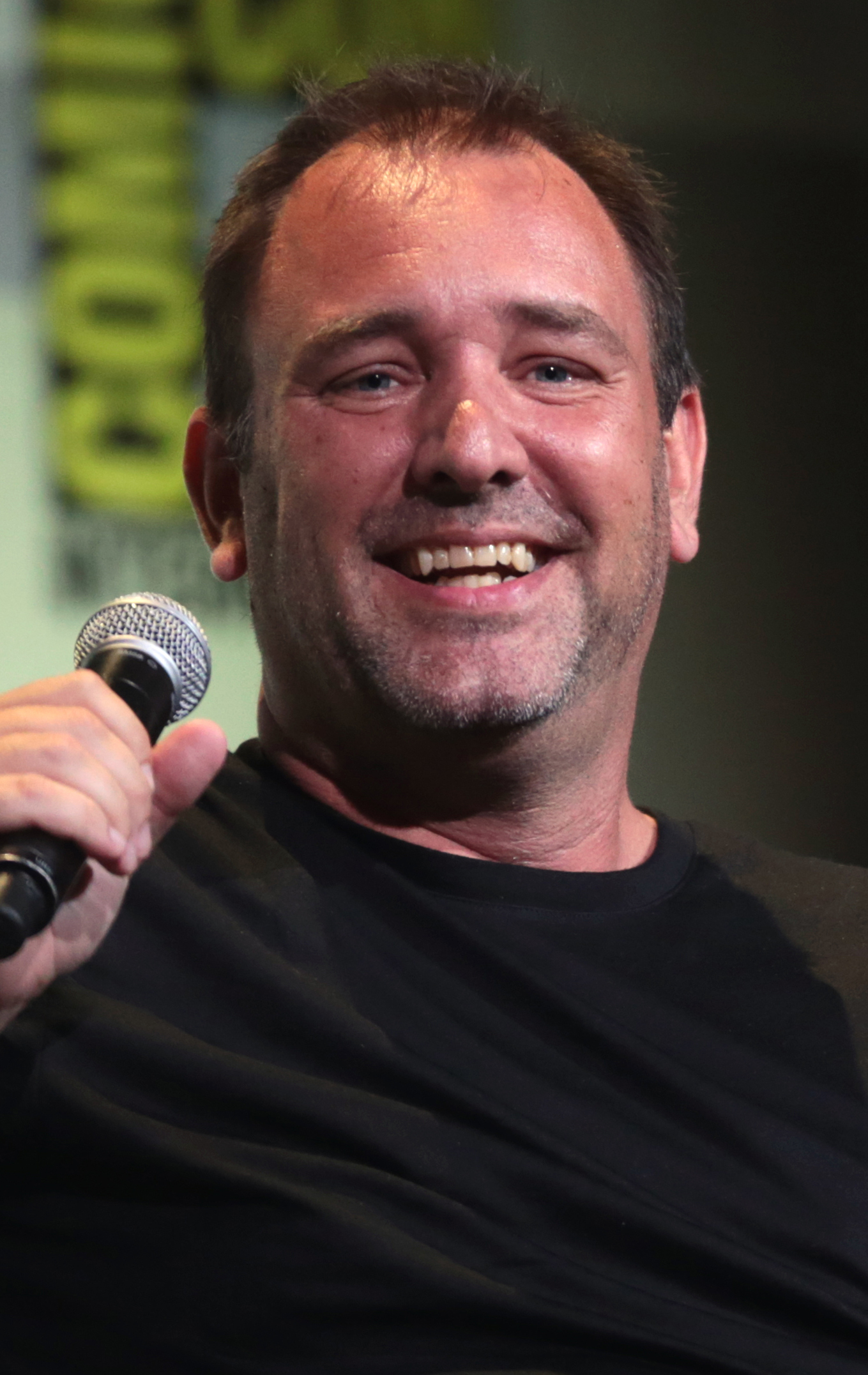
South Park and The Book of Mormon co-creator Trey Parker (BA 1993)

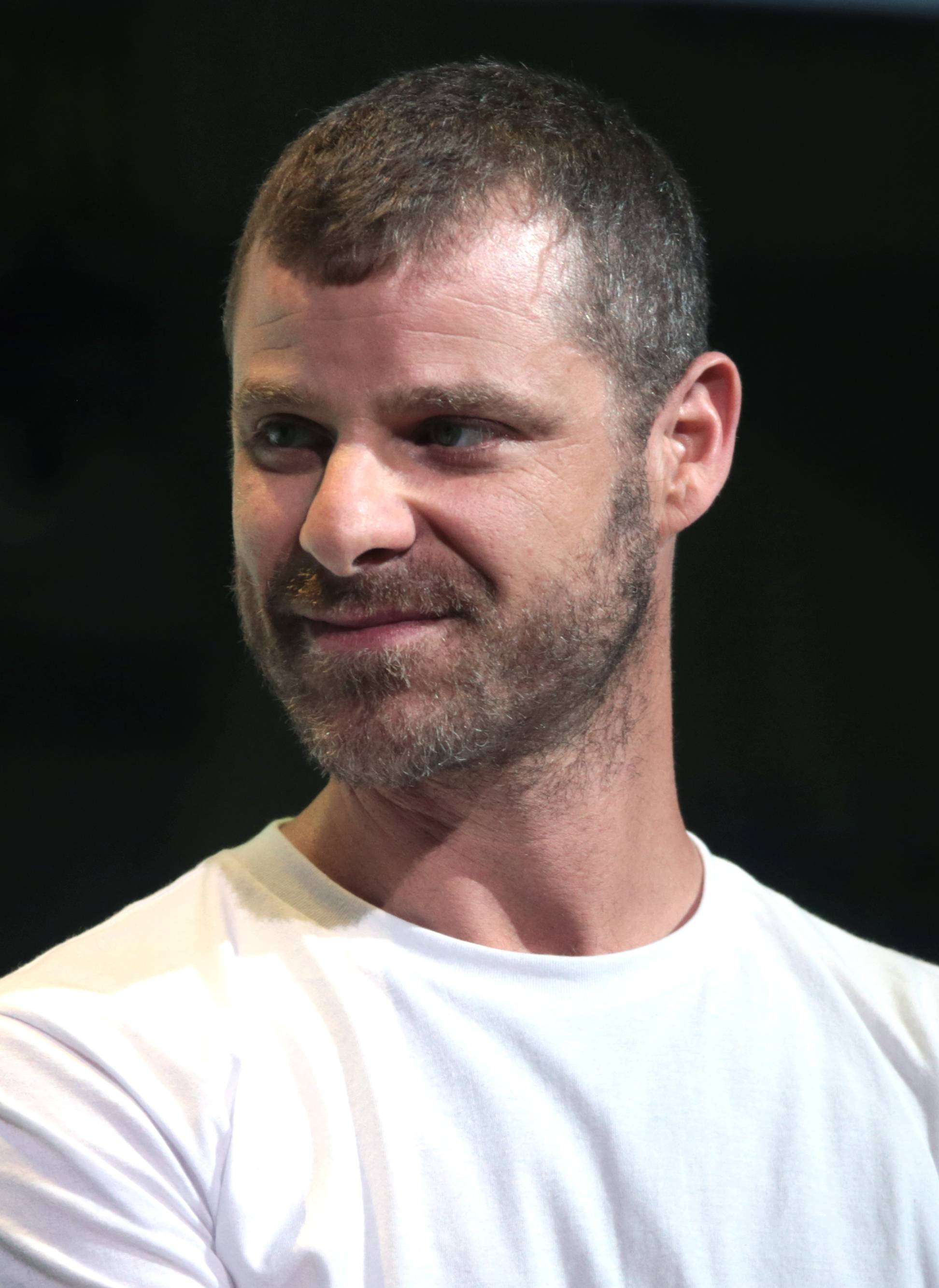
South Park and The Book of Mormon co-creator Matt Stone (BA 1993)

== Chancellors ==
The following persons have served as chancellor of the University of Colorado Boulder:

No.	Image	Chancellor	Term start	Term end	Ref.
1		Lawson Crowe	1974	1976	
2		Mary Frances Berry	1976	1977	
interim		J. Russell Nelson	1977	1978	
3		J. Russell Nelson	1978	1981	
4		Milton E. Lipetz	1981	1982	
5		Harrison Shull	1982	1985	
6		William H. Baughn	1985	1986	
7		James N. Corbridge	1986	1994	
8		Roderic B. Park	1994	1997	
9		Richard L. Byyny	1997	April 30, 2005 (Note: Resigned for position at the University of Colorado Hospital.)	
interim		Philip P. DiStefano	2005	2006	
10		G.P. "Bud" Peterson	July 15, 2006	March 31, 2009 (Note: Resigned to head Georgia Institute of Technology.)	
interim		Philip P. DiStefano	April 1, 2009	May 5, 2009	
11		Philip P. DiStefano	May 5, 2009	June 30, 2024	
12		Justin Schwartz	July 1, 2024	present	

Table notes:

== Notable accomplishments at CU ==
- First to create a new form of matter, the Bose–Einstein condensate, just seven hundred billionths of a degree above absolute zero.
- First to observe a "fermionic condensate" formed from pairs of atoms in a gas.
- First to observe the catalytic properties of RNA which are now foundational to modern biology.
- Developed the "FluChip" to aid physicians in diagnosing respiratory illness and differentiating between three types of influenza and other viruses that cause similar symptoms.
- First place in the 2002 and 2005 U.S. Department of Energy Solar Decathlon. At these first two Solar Decathlon competitions, students and faculty from the Engineering and Architecture programs collaborated to design, construct, transport, and rebuild a house powered exclusively by the sun.
- The Squid server was created at the University of Colorado Boulder by Duane Wessels as part of Harvest project under a grant from the National Science Foundation.
- First zero-waste sports stadium (both collegiate and professional) in the nation.

== Scholarships ==
The Charles and Mildred Nilon Teacher Education Scholarship Fund honors Charles and Mildred Nilon, CU's first African American professor and librarian, respectively. The scholarship is designated for students who are "committed to advancing educational opportunities in under-resourced schools, especially those that serve African American communities."

The Lucile Berkeley Buchanan Scholarship was created to honor Lucile Berkeley Buchanan, CU's first African American female graduate who graduated in 1918.

== See also ==
- List of astronauts educated at the University of Colorado Boulder
