= Ángel Cabrera (academic) =

Spanish-American academic (born 1967)

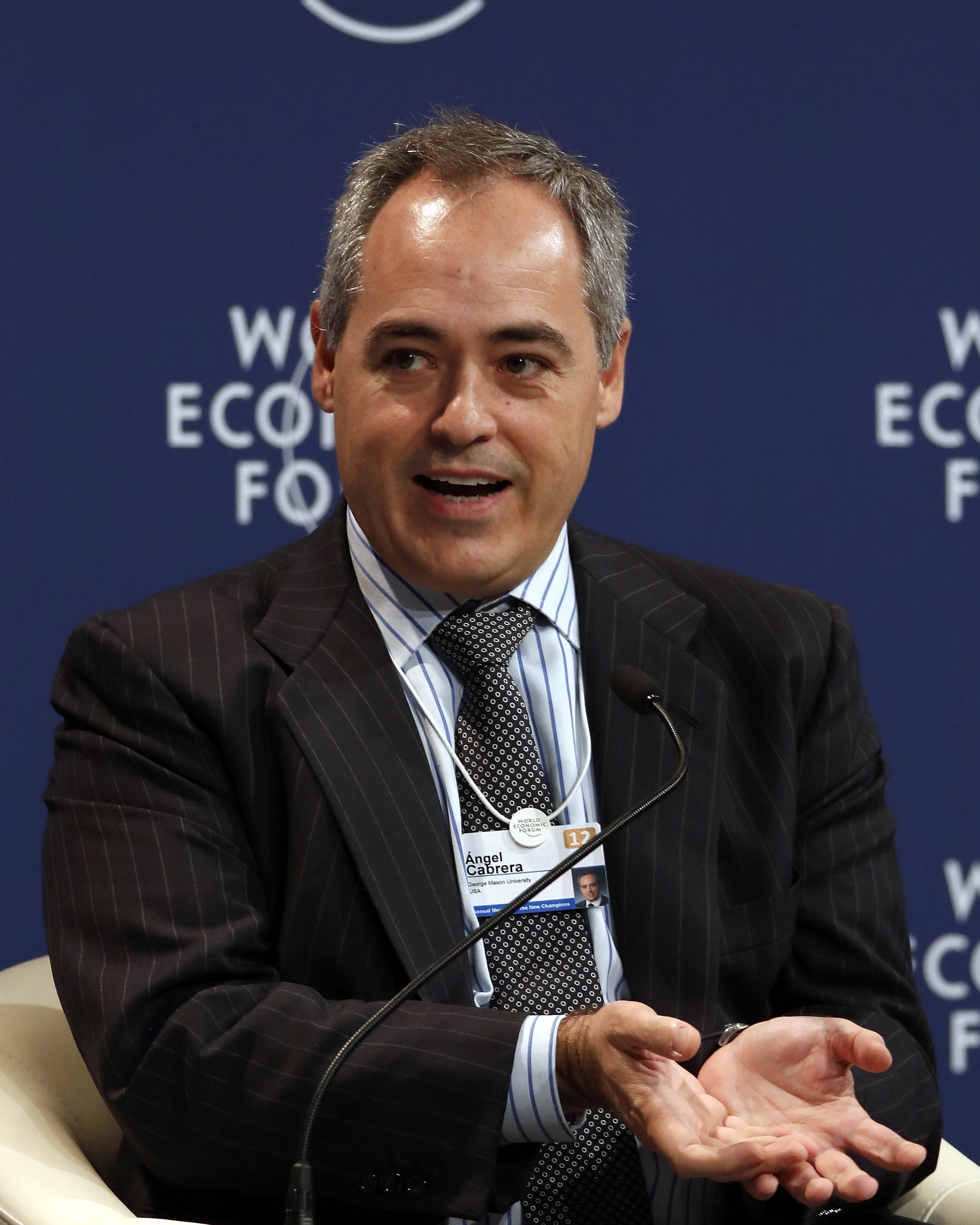
- Cabrera in 2012

President and CEO of the Aspen Institute
- Incumbent
- Assumed office November 1, 2026
- Preceded by: Daniel R. Porterfield

12th President of the Georgia Institute of Technology
- In office September 1, 2019 – November 1, 2026
- Preceded by: Bud Peterson
- Succeeded by: Tim Lieuwen (acting)

6th President of George Mason University
- In office July 1, 2012 – July 31, 2019
- Preceded by: Alan Merten
- Succeeded by: Anne Holton

Personal details
- Born: Ángel Cabrera Izquierdo; August 5, 1967 (age 59) Madrid, Spain
- Children: 2
- Education: Technical University of Madrid (BS, MS); Georgia Institute of Technology (MS, PhD)
- Scientific career
- Fields: Cognitive science
- Workplaces: IE Business School; Thunderbird School of Global Management; George Mason University; Georgia Institute of Technology
- Thesis: A Functional Analysis of Categorization (1995)
- Doctoral advisor: Dorrit Billman

Ángel Cabrera Izquierdo (born August 5, 1967) is a Spanish-American nonprofit executive and academic administrator serving as the president and CEO of the Aspen Institute. He previously served as the 12th president of the Georgia Institute of Technology, and is the first Spanish-born president of an American university. Previously, he was the president of George Mason University and the Thunderbird School of Global Management and the dean of IE Business School. His scholarship includes work on learning, management, and leadership. He became president of the Georgia Institute of Technology in 2019.

== Early life and education ==
Cabrera was born in Madrid, the second of four brothers. He became a first-generation college student, as his parents were not permitted to pursue a college education in Francoist Spain, which ended during Cabrera's childhood. He received his telecommunications engineering degree (equivalent to an undergraduate and master's degree in electrical and computer engineering in the American system) at Universidad Politécnica de Madrid, and he earned his M.S. and Ph.D. in cognitive psychology from the Georgia Institute of Technology as a Fulbright Scholar.

After graduating from Georgia Tech, Cabrera returned to Spain as a consultant for Accenture. He joined the faculty of IE Business School in Madrid in 1998 and was dean from 2000 to 2004. He then moved back to the United States and was appointed president of Thunderbird School of Global Management from July 1, 2004 and president of George Mason University from July 1, 2012.

== Career ==
The World Economic Forum named Cabrera a Global Leader for Tomorrow in 2002 and as one of its Young Global Leaders in 2005. BusinessWeek also selected him as one of the 25 Stars of Europe in 2004. In 2007, he served as the lead author of "Principles for Responsible Management Education" (PRME), an initiative supported by the United Nations to advance sustainable development through management education. It has since been adopted by more than 800 schools around the world. In 2008, he was appointed chairman of the Global Agenda Council for promoting entrepreneurship and named a Henry Crown Fellow by the Aspen Institute. During his tenure as president of Thunderbird School of Global Management, he was named one of the top 20 business school leaders in the world by the Financial Times in 2011. He earned another honor in 2017 when the Carnegie Corporation named him a Great Immigrant.

Cabrera became president of Georgia Tech in 2019. He led the development of a 10-year strategic plan known as Progress and Service for All that was adopted in 2020.

Cabrera is a cofounder of the University Global Coalition, a global network of universities that work with the United Nations to support its Sustainable Development Goals. He serves on the boards of the Association of American Universities, the Atlanta Committee for Progress, the Georgia Research Alliance, the Metro Atlanta Chamber, the National Geographic Society, TIAA, and the Bankinter Innovation Foundation in Spain. He is also a member of the Inter-American Dialogue, the Council on Foreign Relations, and the Harvard College Visiting Committee. He previously served on the board of the Federal Reserve Bank of Richmond; the advisory boards of Instituto Tecnológico de Monterrey and Georgia Tech, which he chaired; and the boards of three public companies.

In 2014, he received an honorary degree from Miami Dade College, and in 2018, he received an honorary doctorate from Universidad Politécnica de Madrid.
