= Phil DiStefano =

American academics officer and teacher

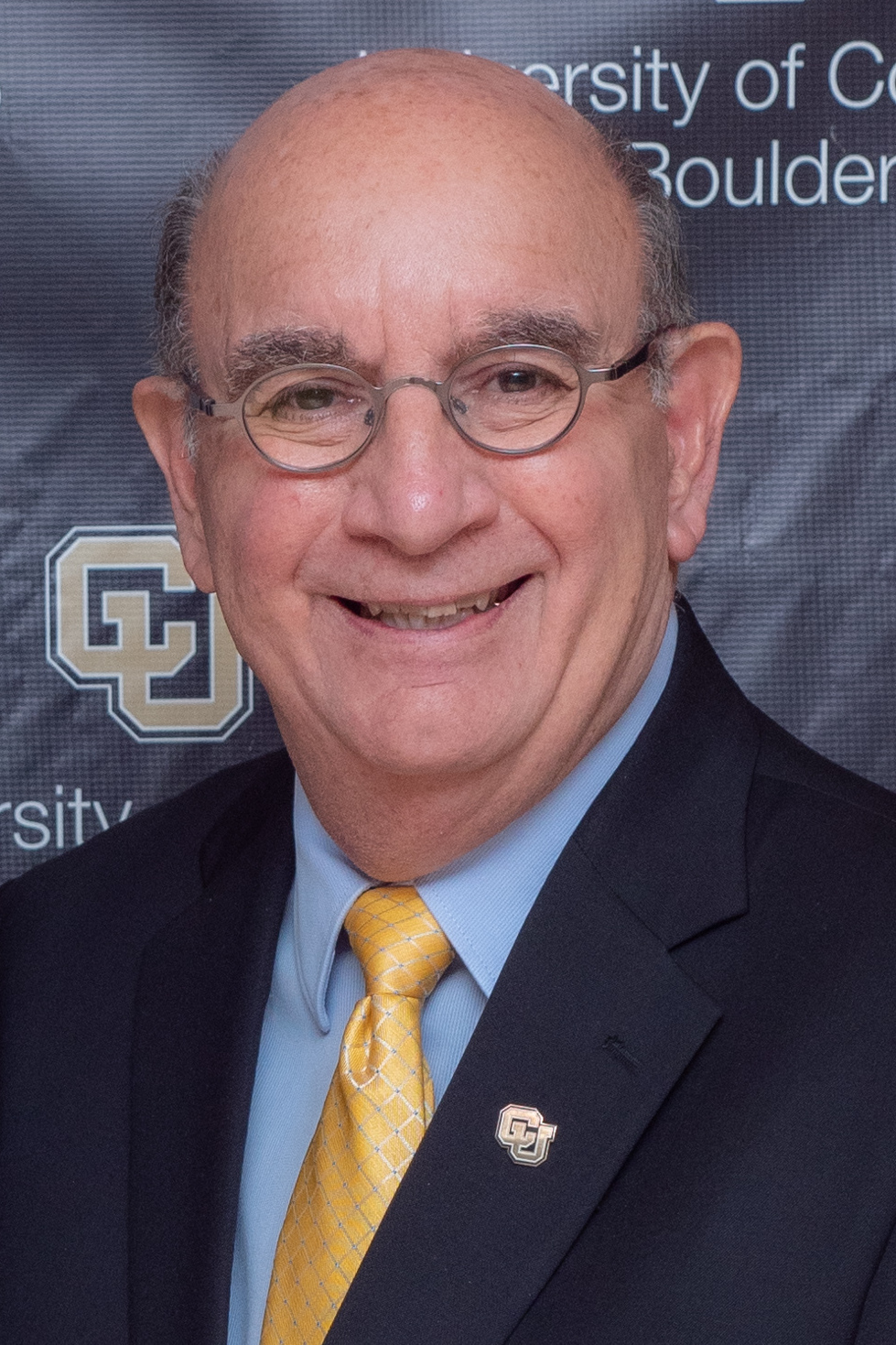
- DiStefano in 2019

11th Chancellor of the University of Colorado Boulder
- In office May 5, 2009 – July 1, 2024
- Preceded by: Bud Peterson
- Succeeded by: Justin Schwartz

Personal details
- Born: September 21, 1946 (age 78); Steubenville, Ohio, U.S.
- Spouse: Yvonne DiStefano (m. 1969)
- Children: 3
- Education: Ohio State University (BS, PhD); West Virginia University (MA)

Philip P. DiStefano (born September 21, 1946) is an academic administrator who serves as the 11th chancellor of the University of Colorado Boulder since May 2009. He has taught at the University of Colorado, Boulder since 1974, and holds the Quigg and Virginia S. Newton Endowed Leadership chair.

== Early life and education ==
Philip DiStefano was born and raised in Steubenville, Ohio. He received a Bachelor of Science from the Ohio State University and a Masters of Arts in English from West Virginia University. He later received a Ph.D in humanities from the Ohio State University.

== Career ==
After attaining his master's degree, DiStefano began teaching high school English in Steubenville. In 1974, he joined the University of Colorado in Boulder as an assistant professor in curriculum and instruction, part of the university's School of Education. DiStefano holds the Quigg and Virginia S. Newton Endowed Leadership chair, and he oversees leadership programs at the University of Colorado.

DiStefano has also served as a member and director of several boards throughout his career, including the Association of American Universities, the National Collegiate Athletic Association, North America's Research Universities, Boulder Community Hospital, and the Pac-12 Conference.

Before being appointed as chancellor of the University of Colorado Boulder, DiStefano served two terms as interim chancellor. In May 2009, he was named the 11th chancellor of the university. On September 26, 2023, DiStefano announced he would be stepping down as chancellor. After the university selected Justin Schwartz as his successor, DiStefano officially retired from his position on July 1, 2024.

== Controversies ==
=== Suspension from the University of Colorado ===
In 2017, DiStefano was suspended without pay for ten days for failing to report domestic abuse allegations against an assistant football coach at the school. Rick George, the athletics director at the University of Colorado, Boulder, as well as Mike MacIntyre, the football coach, both reportedly shared the allegations with DiStefano, who failed to report them or give the allegations any further attention. George and MacIntyre were both ordered to pay $100,000 to domestic violence charities as a result of these allegations, a punishment that was met with some controversy as their base salaries were more than $2 million. DiStefano donated his ten-day suspension pay to domestic violence charities as well.

=== Protests against budget cuts ===
In 2018, DiStefano announced that the budget for the Colorado University student government would be cut by more than 90%, and that $21 million of the $23 million budget would be moved to the Vice Chancellor for Student Affairs. Many student unions gathered in support of the student government, calling for the removal of DiStefano due to the decision. Further rallies were led by five groups of student union candidates in another, separate campaign.

=== Response to threats to campus ===
On 22 March 2021, a mass shooting occurred at a King Soopers supermarket in Boulder. The University of Colorado did not send alerts to notify students and faculty of the shooting until almost three hours after the shooting began. The next year, on 31 January 2022, an 800-page manifesto was published online. The author, who was living close to the University of Colorado campus, threatened members of the University of California, Los Angeles (UCLA) philosophy department, as well as included general references to Boulder and the University of Colorado. UCLA held remote classes on 1 February. The University of Colorado Boulder, however, held classes in person that day and did not send alerts to its students until 10 A.M., nearly two hours after the police became involved. The author of the manifesto was eventually arrested at his home. Following the arrest, a petition was started calling for DiStefano's resignation, citing how out-of-state threats caused enough alarm for UCLA to close campus, but not enough alarm for the University of Colorado, which was under in-state threat. University of Colorado students also cited the university's apparent "lack of care" toward the student body.

== Personal life ==
DiStefano married Yvonne DiStefano in 1969. They have three daughters and two grandchildren.

Academic offices
Preceded by George P. Peterson	11th Chancellor of the University of Colorado Boulder; 2009 – present	Incumbent
