= Gary Schuster =

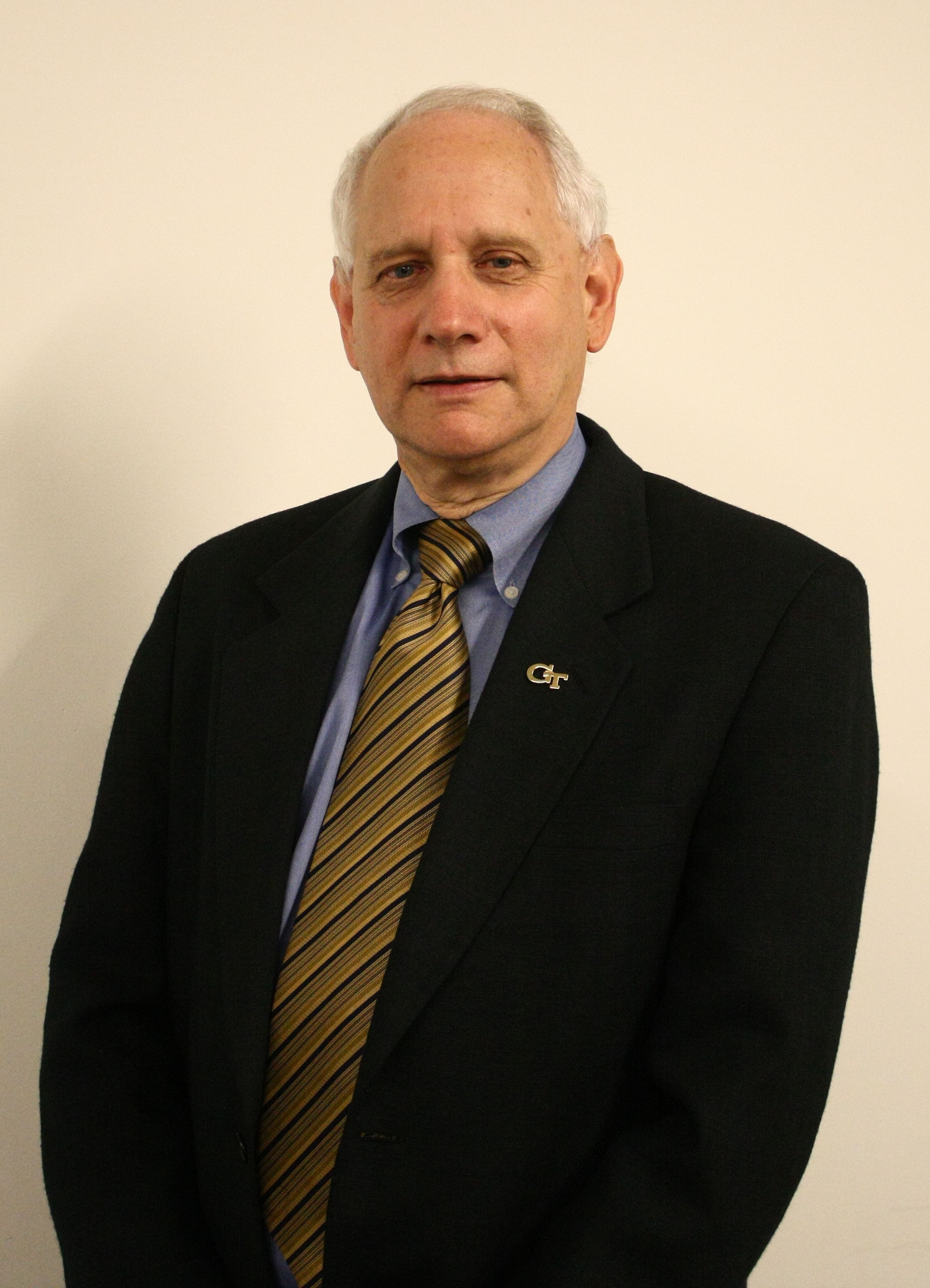
- Born: August 6, 1946 (age 80); New York City, New York
- Education: Clarkson College of Technology; University of Rochester
- Scientific career
- Fields: Chemistry
- Workplaces: Georgia Institute of Technology

Gary Benjamin Schuster (born August 6, 1946) was the interim president of the Georgia Institute of Technology, a position he held from July 1, 2008, when former president G. Wayne Clough stepped down, until April 1, 2009, when George P. "Bud" Peterson was named Georgia Tech's permanent president. He still holds the office Vasser Woolley Chair of Chemistry and Biochemistry.

== Early life and education ==
Schuster earned a B.S. in Chemistry at Clarkson College of Technology in 1968, and a Ph.D. in Chemistry at University of Rochester in 1971.

== Academic life ==
=== University of Illinois ===
Schuster was a faculty member at the University of Illinois at Urbana-Champaign for 20 years. He also served as Head of the Department of Chemistry in the UIUC College of Liberal Arts and Sciences from 1989 to 1994.

=== Georgia Tech ===
Schuster became Dean of the Georgia Institute of Technology College of Sciences and professor of chemistry and biochemistry in 1994.

He became Provost in 2006.

He was named Interim President on April 4, 2008, and assumed the office on July 1, 2008. On April 1, 2009, Schuster stepped down from the position as George P. "Bud" Peterson took over as the Institute's permanent president.

== Honors and awards ==
- Charles Holmes Herty Medal (2006)
- Fellow, American Association for the Advancement of Science (2004)
- Chancellor's Award, University System of Georgia (1998)
- Arthur C. Cope Scholar Award (1994)
- Paul Flory - IBM Fellowship
