= G. P. "Bud" Peterson =

American university administrator (born 1952)

G. P. Peterson
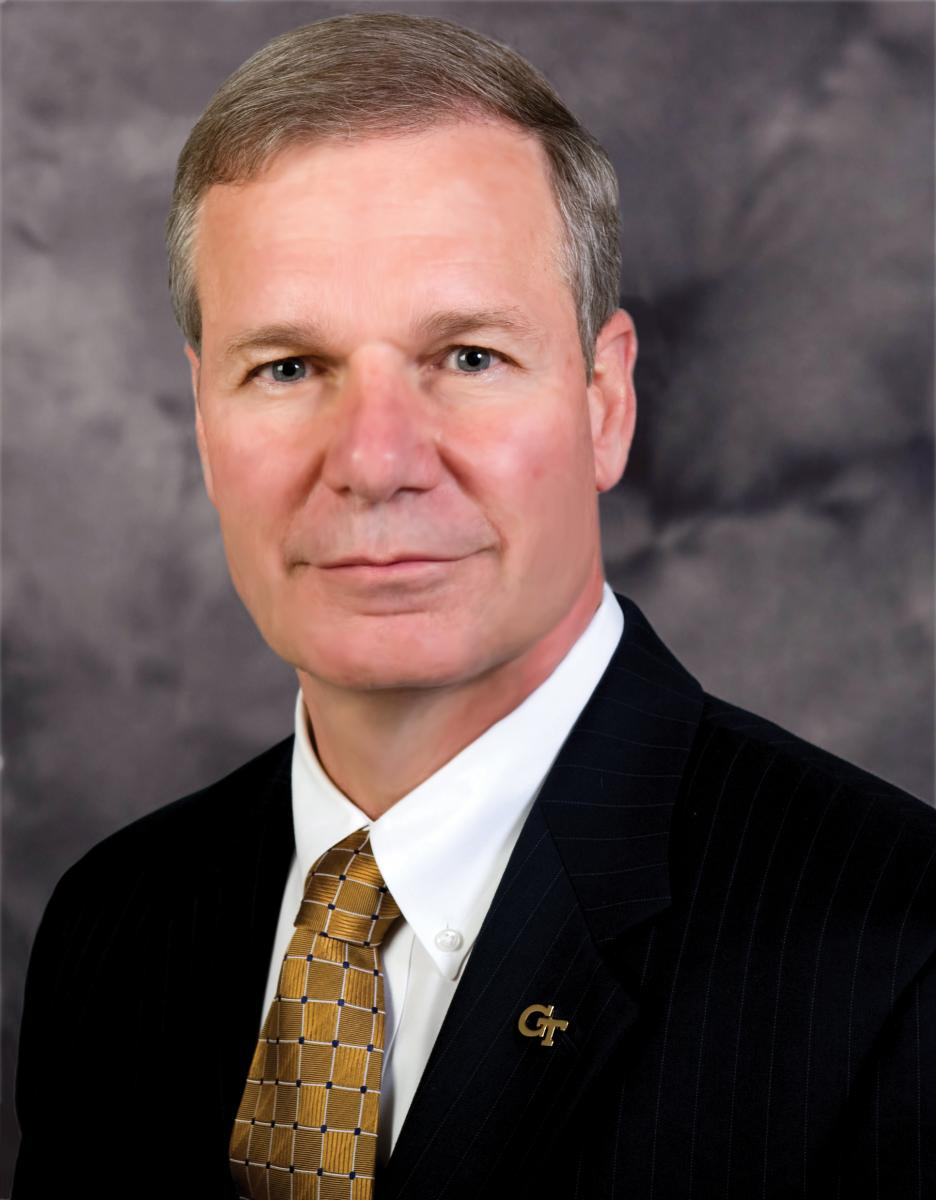
- Peterson in 2009

11th President of the Georgia Institute of Technology
- In office April 1, 2009 – September 1, 2019
- Preceded by: G. Wayne Clough
- Succeeded by: Ángel Cabrera

10th Chancellor of the University of Colorado Boulder
- In office July 15, 2006 – March 31, 2009
- Preceded by: Phil DiStefano (interim); Richard L. Byyny
- Succeeded by: Phil DiStefano

Personal details
- Born: George Paul Peterson; September 1, 1952 (age 74) Palo Alto, California, U.S.
- Other name: Bud Peterson
- Scientific career
- Education: Texas A&M University; Kansas State University
- Known for: Contributions to phase change heat transfer
- Fields: Mechanical engineering
- Workplaces: Georgia Institute of Technology; University of Colorado at Boulder; Rensselaer Polytechnic Institute; Texas A&M University
- Thesis: Analytical and experimental investigation of a dual passage, monogroove heat pipe (zero-g devices, two-phase flow mathematical models) (1985)
- Doctoral advisor: Mario Colaluca

George Paul "Bud" Peterson (born September 1, 1952) is the former president of the Georgia Institute of Technology. On January 7, 2019, Peterson announced his upcoming retirement from Georgia Tech, effective summer of 2019. His successor, Ángel Cabrera, assumed the office September 1, 2019, after serving for seven years as president of George Mason University in Fairfax, Virginia. In September 2019, the University System of Georgia Board of Regents voted to name Peterson President Emeritus and Regents Professor of Mechanical Engineering for the standard three-year term. The Board of Regents also awarded him tenure.

Prior to his position as Georgia Tech's 11th president, Peterson served as the chancellor of the University of Colorado at Boulder, the provost of Rensselaer Polytechnic Institute, and associate vice-chancellor and executive associate dean of Engineering of Texas A&M University.

Peterson was named as the sole finalist for the position of president of Georgia Tech on February 2, 2009, and was accepted Feb. 25, 2009. He succeeded G. Wayne Clough and Gary Schuster (interim) when he took the position April 1, 2009. He was officially installed as president at a September 3, 2009, investiture ceremony.

== Early life and education ==
Peterson was born in Palo Alto, California, in 1952, but spent his early life in Prairie Village, Kansas, a suburb of Kansas City. He attended Shawnee Mission East High School, where he lettered in football, basketball, and track. He subsequently went to Kansas State, where he played American football first as a walk-on and later as a scholarship student-athlete with the Kansas State Wildcats. He started 26 games and lettered three years as a tight end/wide receiver from 1970 to 1974, catching 30 passes for 359 yards.

Peterson graduated from Kansas State with a B.S. in mechanical engineering in 1975 and mathematics in 1977. Peterson stayed at Kansas State and received an M.S. in engineering in 1980. He then went to Texas A&M University, receiving a doctorate in Mechanical Engineering in 1985.

== Career ==
Peterson worked at Black & Veatch Consulting Engineers in the summer following his graduation with his first bachelor's degree in mechanical engineering. After receiving his second degree (mathematics) in 1977, he worked as a math, chemistry and physics teacher at Wabaunsee County High School in Alma, Kansas, and later as a mathematics teacher at Shawnee Mission South High School in Overland Park, Kansas.

After receiving his M.S., Peterson was an associate professor and head of the General Engineering Technology Department at Kansas Technical Institute in Salina, Kansas, from 1979 to 1981. He was subsequently a visiting research scientist at NASA's Johnson Space Center in Houston, Texas, during the summers of 1981 and 1982. While at NASA, Peterson developed a (still used) technique to determine the priming capability of high-capacity heat pipes in low gravity.

In 1985, Peterson moved to the Mechanical Engineering department of Texas A&M University. Initially an assistant professor, he became an associate professor in 1988 and a full professor in 1990. Peterson held other miscellaneous positions around this time; he became the head of the Thermal and Fluid Sciences Division in 1989, was the Halliburton Professor of Engineering in 1990–1991, the Tenneco Professor of Mechanical Engineering in 1991–2000, and was the head of the Mechanical Engineering department from 1993 to 1996. From August 1993 to September 1994, Peterson also worked for the National Science Foundation as the program director for their Thermal Transport and Thermal Processing Program. In 1996, Peterson was appointed Texas A&M's executive associate dean of Engineering and also served as the Associate vice chancellor for the Texas A&M University System.

From July 2000 until June 2006, Peterson was the provost at Rensselaer Polytechnic Institute in Troy, New York. He was then the chancellor at the University of Colorado at Boulder from July 2006 until his departure for Georgia Tech in 2009.

During Peterson's first year as president, Georgia Tech launched the InVenture Prize, an annual invention competition for undergraduate students to showcase innovative solutions to a panel of judges. The competition, which awards $20,000 and free U.S. patent filing to the student winner, airs live on Georgia Public Broadcasting. During Peterson's tenure InVenture Prize spawned three new versions including a version for K-12 students across the state of Georgia and the ACC InVenture Prize which pits student inventors from Atlantic Coast Conference Colleges head-to-head.

During Peterson's tenure in 2010, Georgia Tech became the first American college in nearly a decade to be accepted into the American Association of Universities (AAU), largely seen as an affirmation of the Institute's status as one of America's top research institutions. The AAU had studied Georgia Tech's accolades for several years including the amount of federal grants and the number of faculty awards and research citations.

While president at Georgia Tech, he was accused of a lack of due process by students. This resulted in lawsuits that resulted in students who were accused of sexual misconduct being reinstated and winning settlements. After criticism led by former Georgia state lawmaker Earl Ehrhart, Tech withdrew a 47 million dollar request to fund a renovation project of Institute's library complex. Along with those allegations, he was accused of a wrongful termination, and therefore sued by Dr. Joy Laskar, and several court proceedings followed with Laskar winning the case.

Georgia Tech rapidly expanded its global footprint in the decade of Peterson's term as president. Tech established new research programs in Europe, Asia, and Latin America and grew collaborations with more than 100 countries. During Peterson's time as president, more than 58% of Georgia Tech's undergraduate students participated in an international experience like studying, researching, or working abroad.

On September 23, 2017, Peterson announced a fund he created for donors to contribute money for student mental health and wellness initiatives. Peterson stated the fund was set up following discussions with student organizations and others in the wake of the fatal campus police shooting of Georgia Tech student Scout Schultz that occurred the weekend prior to the announcement as well as due to a riot on campus. This resulted in a lawsuit by the family which resulted in a million dollar settlement.

In late 2018 and early 2019, a number of ethics lapses and conflict of interest allegations by several top Georgia Tech administrators were revealed, leading to several resignations. There was a professor charged with defrauding the NSF. There were also security breaches that exposed the data of 1.3 million individuals. In early January 2019, Peterson announced his planned retirement as president of Georgia Tech in summer 2019.

During Peterson's time as President of Georgia Tech, the Institute added more than 30 corporate innovation and incubation centers on campus, which allow students and faculty to work directly with industry partners to develop solutions to issues affecting everything from supply chain, and customer service to manufacturing. The companies represented include Delta Air Lines, Chick-Fil-A, AT&T, Anthem, Inc., and Home Depot.

Peterson, together with Provost Rafael L. Bras and Georgia Tech Dean of Computing Zvi Galil, spearheaded an effort to help Georgia Tech dramatically expanded options for Massive open online course (MOOC) offerings and other online learning opportunities. Between 2012 and 2018, Georgia Tech's MOOCs had a total of more than 3.7 million enrollments. In 2014, Georgia Tech partnered with AT&T to launch an Online Master of Science in Computer Science (OMSCS) degree program. By 2019, the program enrolled more than 8,500 students in all 50 states and 120 countries.

On February 2, 2020, Peterson was appointed as a board member on the American University of Sharjah's (AUS) Board of Trustees.

Peterson also serves on the board for the Partnership for Inclusive Innovation(PIN), a program aimed to position Georgia to become the technology capital of the East Coast. PIN's initiatives include pilot programs to encourage greater access, growth, entrepreneurship and innovation throughout the state of Georgia, with the ultimate goal of achieving inclusive innovation throughout Georgia.

It is estimated that Peterson shook the hands of more than 60,000 graduates during his term as president at Georgia Tech. The school upholds the tradition of calling each graduate's name and Peterson was on stage to personally congratulate every student who crossed the stage to receive their degree.

Since his retirement as president, Peterson has stepped back into the classroom and laboratory at Georgia Tech, teaching mechanical engineering courses and continuing his research in the fields of heat transfer and combustion.

== Awards ==
- Frank J. Malina Astronautics Medal (2005)

== Books ==
- Peterson, G.P., An Introduction to Heat Pipes: Modeling, Testing and Applications, John Wiley & Sons, New York, 1994, 356 pp. ISBN 978-0-471-30512-5
- Sobhan, C.B. and Peterson, G.P., Microscale and Nanoscale Heat Transfer, CRC Press Inc., New York, 2007, 410 pp. ISBN 978-0-8493-7307-7
- Peterson, G.P. and Li, C.H., Fundamentals of Thermal Transfer Phenomena in Nanoparticle Suspensions, in progress.

Academic offices
Preceded by Phil DiStefano (interim); Richard L. Byyny	10th Chancellor of the University of Colorado Boulder; 2006–2009	Succeeded by Phil DiStefano
Preceded by G. Wayne Clough	11th President of the Georgia Institute of Technology; 2009–2019	Succeeded by Ángel Cabrera
