= List of leaders of universities and colleges in the United States =

This article contains a partial listing of leaders of American universities and colleges, who are usually given the title president or chancellor.

== Universities with a President ==
=== A ===
- Adams State University – David A. Tandberg
- Adelphi University – Christopher Storm, Jr., Interim
- Adrian College – Jeffrey R. Docking,
- Agnes Scott College – Leocadia I. Zak
- Alabama A&M University – Daniel K. Wims
- Alabama State University – Quinton T. Ross Jr
- Alaska Pacific University – Janelle Vanasse
- Albany College of Pharmacy and Health Sciences – Toyin Tofade
- Albion College – Wayne Webster
- Albright College – Debra Townsley, Interim President
- Alfred University – Mark Zupan
- Allegheny College – Ron Cole
- Alma College – Joseph L. Odenwald
- Alvernia University – Glynis Fitzgerald
- Alverno College – Christy L. Brown
- The American College – George Nichols III
- American University – Jonathan Alger
- Amherst College – Michael A. Elliott
- Anderson University – Evans P. Whitaker
- Antioch College – Jane Fernandes
- Antioch University – Lori E. Varlotta
- Appalachian College of Pharmacy – Michael McGlothlin
- Arizona State University – Michael M. Crow
- Arkansas Baptist College – Leslie Rodriguez-McClellon
- Atlantic University – Kevin J. Todeschi, CEO
- Athens State University – Catherine Wehlburg
- Auburn University – Christopher B. Roberts
- Augustana College – Andrea Talentino
- Austin College – Steven O'Day
- Averett University – Venita Mitchell, Acting
- Avila University – James Burkee

=== B ===
- Ball State University – Geoffrey Mearns
- Baptist Health Sciences University – Hampton Hopkins
- Bard College – Leon Botstein
- Bates College - Garry Jenkins
- Batten University – Scott D. Miller
- Baylor College of Medicine – Paul Klotman, President and CEO
- Baylor University – Linda Livingstone
- Belmont Abbey College – Joseph Wysocki, Interim
- Beloit College – Eric Boynton
- Bemidji State University – John Hoffman
- Bennett College – Suzanne Elise Walsh
- Bentley University – E. LaBrent Chrite
- Berea College – Cheryl L. Nixon
- Bethany College (Kansas) – Laura Crawley
- Bethany College (West Virginia) – Jamie Caridi
- Bloomfield College – Marcheta P. Evans
- Bluefield University – Steven Peterson
- Bluefield State University – Darrin Martin
- Blue Mountain Christian University – Barbara McMillin
- Boise State University – Jeremiah Shinn, Interim
- Boston College – William P. Leahy
- Boston University – Melissa L. Gilliam
- Brandeis University – Arthur E. Levine
- Bridgerland Technical College – Chad K. Campbell
- Brigham Young University – C. Shane Reese
  - Brigham Young University–Hawaii – John S. K. Kauwe III
  - Brigham Young University–Idaho – Alvin F. Meredith III
- Brown University – Christina Paxson
- Bryn Mawr College – Wendy Cadge
- Bucknell University – John C. Bravman
- Butler University – James Danko

=== C ===
- California Institute of Technology (Caltech) – Thomas Felix Rosenbaum
- Cameron University – C. Shane Hunt
- Carnegie Mellon University – Farnam Jahanian, Interim
- Case Western Reserve University – Eric Kaler
- The Catholic University of America – Peter Kilpatrick
- Central College (Iowa) – Mark Putnam
- Centre College – Milton C. Moreland
- Chaminade University - Lynn Babington
- Chapman University – Daniele C. Struppa
- The Citadel– Glenn M. Walters
- Claremont McKenna College – Hiram Chodosh
- Claremont Graduate University – Len Jessup
- Clarkson University – Michelle Larson
- Clayton State University – Kerry L. Heyward, Interim
- Clemson University – Robert H. Jones, Interim
- Coahoma Community College – Valmadge Towner
- Coastal Carolina University – James J. Winebrake
- Colby College – David Greene
- The College of New Jersey – Michael Bernstein
- College of Charleston – Andrew Hsu
- College of William and Mary – Katherine Rowe
- Colorado College – Manya Whitaker
- Colorado School of Mines – Paul C. Johnson
- Colorado State University – Amy Parsons
- Community College of Rhode Island - Dr. Rosemary Costigan
- Concord University – Bethany Meighen
- Connecticut College – Andrea Chapdelaine
- Connecticut State University System – O. John Maduko
  - Central Connecticut State University – Zulma R. Toro Ramos
  - Eastern Connecticut State University – Karim Ismaili
  - Southern Connecticut State University – Sandra Bulmer, Interim
  - Western Connecticut State University – Jesse M. Bernal
- Cornell University – Michael Kotlikoff
- Curry College – Jay Gonzalez

=== D ===
- Dartmouth College – Sian Beilock
- Davidson College – Douglas A. Hicks
- Davis & Elkins College – Chris Wood
- Delaware State University – Tony Allen
- DePaul University – Robert L. Manuel
- DePauw University – Lori White
- Dickinson College – John E. Jones III
- Drew University – Hilary L. Link
- Drexel University – Antonio Merlo
- Drury University – Jeff Frederick
- Duke University – Vincent Price
- Duquesne University – Ken Gormley

=== E ===
- Eastern Michigan University – James M. Smith
- Eastern New Mexico University – James N. Johnston
- Eastern Oregon University – Kelly Ryan
- Edward Via College of Osteopathic Medicine – Dixie Tooke-Rawlins
- Edward Waters University – A. Zachary Faison, Jr.
- Elizabethtown College – Elizabeth A. Rider
- Elmhurst University - Troy VanAken
- Elon University – Connie Ledoux Book
- Emmanuel College (Massachusetts) – E. Elizabeth Rosst
- Emory University – Gregory L. Fenves
- Ensign College - Bruce Kusch

=== F ===
- Fairmont State University – Michael K. Davis
- Ferris State University – Bill Pink
- Ferrum College – Mirta Martin
- Fisk University – Agenia Walker Clark
- Florida A&M University – Marva Johnson
- Florida Atlantic University – Adam Hasner
- Florida Gulf Coast University – Aysegul Timur
- Florida International University – Jeanette Nuñez, Interim
- Florida Memorial University – Jaffus Hardrick
- Florida Southern College – Jeremy P. Martin
- Florida State University – Richard D. McCullough
- Fordham University – Tania Tetlow
- Fort Hays State University – Tisa Mason
- Fort Valley State University – Paul Jones
- Franklin & Marshall College – Andrew Rich
- Furman University – Elizabeth Davis

=== G ===
- Georgia Institute of Technology – Ángel Cabrera
- George Mason University – Gregory Washington
- George Washington University – Ellen Granberg
- Georgia State University – M. Brian Blake
- Georgetown University – Robert Groves, Interim
- Gettysburg College – Robert Iuliano
- Glenville State University – Mark Manchin
- Grambling State University – Martin Lemelle
- Grinnell College – Anne F. Harris
- Goucher College – Kent Devereaux

=== H ===
- Hamline University – Mayme Hostetter
- Hampshire College – Jennifer Chrisler
- Hampton University –Darrell K. Williams
- Harris–Stowe State University – LaTonia Collins-Smith
- Harrisburg University of Science and Technology – David A. Schankweiler,
- Harvard University – Alan Garber
- Harvey Mudd College – Harriet Nembhard
- Haverford College – Wendy Raymond
- Hawaii Pacific University – John Y. Gotanda
- High Point University – Nido Qubein
- Hobart and William Smith Colleges – Mark Gearan
- Hollins University – Mary Hinton
- Howard University – Wayne A. I. Frederick, Interim
- Huston–Tillotson University – Melva K. Wallace

=== I ===
- Idaho State University – Robert W. Wagner
- Illinois College – Barbara Farley
- Illinois Institute of Technology – Raj Echambadi
- Illinois State University – Aondover Tarhule
- Illinois Wesleyan University – Sheahon Zenger
- Indiana Institute of Technology – Karl Einolf
- Indiana State University – Michael Godard
- Iowa State University – Wendy Wintersteen
- Ithaca College – La Jerne Terry Cornish

=== J ===
- Jackson State University – Denise Jones Gregory, Interim
- James Madison University – James C. Schmidt
- Jarvis Christian University – Glenell M. Lee-Pruitt
- Johns Hopkins University – Ronald J. Daniels
- Johnson C. Smith University – Valerie Kinloch

=== K ===
- Kalamazoo College – Jorge Gonzalez
- Kansas State University – Richard Linton
- Kean University – Lamont Repollet
- Kent State University – Todd Diacon
- Kent State University at Stark – Denise Seachrist, Dean
- Kentucky State University – Koffi C. Akakpo
- Kenyon College – Julie Kornfeld
- Kettering University – Robert McMahan

=== L ===
- Lafayette College - Nicole Hurd
- Lane College – Dr. Donald W. Comer, Interim
- Langston University – Ruth Ray Jackson
- Lawrence Technological University – Tarek Sobh
- Lawrence University – Laurie Carter
- Lehigh University – Joseph J. Helble
- Lewis & Clark College – Robin Holmes-Sullivan
- Liberty University – Jonathan Falwell, Chancellor, Dondi E. Costin, President
- Lincoln University (Pennsylvania) – Brenda Allen
- Lincoln University of Missouri – John B. Moseley
- Louisiana State University – Matt Lee, Interim
- Loyola Marymount University – Thomas Poon
- Lubbock Christian University – Scott McDowell

=== M ===
- Manhattan University – Frederick Bonato, Interim
- Massachusetts Institute of Technology – Sally Kornbluth
- Merced College – Chris Vitelli
- Miami Dade College – Madeline Pumariega
- Michigan State University – Kevin Guskiewicz,
- Michigan Technological University – Richard J. Koubek
- Miles College – Bobbie Knight
- Mississippi State University – Mark E. Keenum
- Missouri State University - Richard B. "Biff" Williams
- Montana State University – Brock Tessman
- Morehouse College – F. DuBois Bowman
- Morgan State University – David Wilson
- Mount Holyoke College – Danielle Holley-Walker

=== N ===
- New Saint Andrews College – Benjamin R. Merkle
- The New School - Joel Towers
- New York University – Linda G. Mills
- New Mexico Tech - Mahyar Amouzegar
- Niagara University – James J. Maher
- North Dakota State University – David J. Cook
- Northern Arizona University – José Luis Cruz Rivera
- Northeastern University – Joseph E. Aoun
- Northeastern State University – Rodney Hanley
- Northwest Nazarene University – Mark DeMichael
- Northwestern University – Henry Bienen, Interim

=== O ===
- Oakland University – Ora Hirsch Pescovitz
- Oberlin College – Carmen Twillie Ambar
- Occidental College – Tom Stritikus
- Oglethorpe University – Kathryn McClymond
- Ohio State University – Vacant
  - Ohio State University, Marion Campus – Jennifer Schlueter, Dean/Director
  - Ohio State University, Lima Campus – Margaret Young, Dean/Director
  - Ohio State University, Mansfield Campus – Jason Opal, Dean/Director
  - Ohio State University, Newark Campus – William MacDonald, Dean/Director
- Ohio University – Lori Stewart Gonzalez
- Oklahoma Baptist University – Heath Thomas
- Oklahoma City University – Kenneth R. Evans
- Oklahoma State University System
  - Oklahoma State University - Oklahoma City – Jim Hess
  - Oklahoma State University - Stillwater – Jim Hess
  - Oklahoma State University - Tulsa – Johnny Stephens
  - Oklahoma State University Center for Health Sciences
  - Oklahoma State University Institute of Technology
- Olin College - R. May Lee
- Oral Roberts University – William Wilson
- Oregon Health & Science University – Shereef Elnahal
- Oregon State University – Jayathi Murthy
- Otterbein University – John Comerford

=== P ===
- Pace University – Marvin Krislov
- Pennsylvania State University – Neeli Bendapudi
- Pepperdine University – Jim Gash
- Pitzer College – Strom C. Thacker
- Pomona College – G. Gabrielle Starr
- Portland State University – Ann Cudd
- Prairie View A&M University – Tomikia P. LeGrande
- Presbyterian College – Anita Gustafson
- Princeton University – Christopher L. Eisgruber
- Purdue University – Mung Chiang

=== Q ===
- Quinnipiac University – Marie Hardin

=== R ===
- Reed College – Audrey Bilger
- Rensselaer Polytechnic Institute – Martin A. Schmidt
- Rhode Island College – Jack R. Warner
- Rhodes College – Jennifer Collins
- Rice University – Reginald DesRoches
- Rutgers University - William F. Tate IV
- Rochester Institute of Technology – William H. Sanders

=== S ===
- Saint Francis University – Malachi Van Tassell
- St. John's College (Annapolis/Santa Fe) – Susan Paalman, Annapolis President; J. Walter Sterling, Santa Fe President
- St. Lawrence University – Kathryn A. Morris
- Saint Louis University – Edward J. Feser
- St. Mary's College of Maryland – Rhonda Phillips
- Santa Clara University – Julie Sullivan
- Savannah State University – Jermaine Whirl
- Scripps College – Amy Marcus-Newhall
- Seattle University – Eduardo Peñalver
- Seton Hall University – Joseph R. Reilly
- Shippensburg University – Charles E. Patterson
- Skidmore College - Marc Cameron Conner
- South Dakota State University – Barry Dunn
- Southeastern Louisiana University – William S. Wainwright
- Southern College of Optometry – Lewis Reich
- Southern Methodist University – Jay Hartzell
- Southern New Hampshire University – Lisa Marsh Ryerson
- Southern Oregon University – Rick Bailey
- Southern Utah University – Mindy Benson
- Southern Virginia University – Bonnie H. Cordon
- Southwest Baptist University – Richard J. Melson
- Southwestern College – Elizabeth Frombogen
- Stanford University – Jonathan Levin
- Stetson University – Chris Roellke
- Stevens Institute of Technology – Nariman Farvardin

=== T ===
- Taylor University – D. Michael Lindsay
- Temple University – John Fry
- Tennessee State University – Dwayne Tucker
- Tennessee Technological University – Philip Oldham
- Texas A&M University–Victoria – James Nelson, Interim
- Towson University – Mark R. Ginsberg
- Trevecca Nazarene University – Dan Boone
- Trine University – Earl D. Brooks II
- Trinity International University – David W. Pao, Interim
- Trinity University (Texas) – Vanessa B. Beasley
- Trinity Washington University – Patricia McGuire
- Truman State University – Susan L. Thomas
- Tufts University – Sunil Kumar
- Tulane University – Michael Fitts

=== University ===
==== University A ====
- University of Akron – Matthew J. Wilson
- University of Arizona – Suresh Garimella

==== University C ====
- University of Central Florida – Alexander Cartwright
- University of Central Missouri – Roger Best
- University of Central Oklahoma – Todd Lamb
- University of Charleston – Martin S. Roth
- University of Chicago – Paul Alivisatos
- University of Connecticut – Radenka Maric
- University of the Cumberlands – Quentin Young

==== University D ====
- University of Delaware – Laura Carlson

==== University F ====
- University of Florida – Donald W. Landry

==== University G ====
- University of Georgia – Jere Morehead

==== University I ====
- University of Idaho – C. Scott Green
- University of Indianapolis – Tanuja Singh
- University of Iowa – Barbara J. Wilson

==== University K ====
- University of Kentucky – Eli Capilouto

==== University L ====
- University of Louisiana System – Rick Gallot
  - University of Louisiana at Lafayette – Jaimie L. Hebert, Interim
  - University of Louisiana at Monroe – Carrie Castille
- University of Louisville – Gerry Bradley

==== University M ====
- University of Memphis – Bill Hardgrave
- University of Miami – Joe Echevarria
- University of Montana – Seth Bodnar

==== University N ====
- University of Nevada, Las Vegas – Christopher L. Heavey, Interim
- University of Nevada, Reno – Brian Sandoval
- University of New Hampshire – Elizabeth S. Chilton
- University of New Mexico – Garnett S. Stokes
- University of North Dakota – Andrew Armacost
- University of Notre Dame – Robert A. Dowd

==== University O ====
- University of Oklahoma – Joseph Harroz
- University of Oregon – Karl Scholz

==== University P ====
- University of the Pacific – Christopher Callahan
- University of Pennsylvania – J. Larry Jameson
- University of Portland – Robert D. Kelly

==== University R ====
- University of Rochester – Sarah C. Mangelsdorf
- University of Rhode Island – Marc Parlange

==== University S ====
- University of South Carolina – Michael Amiridis
- University of South Dakota – Sheila Gestring
- University of Southern California – Beong-Soo Kim, Interim
- University of Southern Mississippi – Joseph S. Paul

==== University T ====
- University of Tulsa – Rick Dickson

==== University U ====
- University of Utah – Taylor R. Randall

==== University V ====
- University of Vermont – Marlene Tromp
- University of Virginia – Paul G. Mahoney, Interim

==== University W ====
- University of Washington – Robert J. Jones
- University of West Georgia - Dr. Michael Johnson
- University of Wyoming – Edward Seidel

=== U ===
- Union College – Elizabeth Kiss
- Ursinus College – Gundolf Graml, Interim
- Utah State University – Alan Smith, Interim
- Utah Valley University – Astrid S. Tuminez

=== V ===
- Virginia Commonwealth University – Michael Rao
- Virginia Tech – Timothy D. Sands

=== W ===
- Wabash College – Scott E. Feller
- Wake Forest University – Susan Rae Wente
- Washburn University – JuliAnn Mazachek
- Washington and Lee University – William C. Dudley
- Washington State University – Elizabeth R. Cantwell
- Wayne State University – Richard A. Bierschbach, Interim
- Wellesley College – Paula A. Johnson
- Wentworth Institute of Technology – Mark A. Thompsont
- Western New Mexico University – Christopher Maples, Interim
- Western Oregon University – Jesse Peters
- West Virginia State University – Ericke S. Cage
- West Virginia University – Michael T. Benson
  - West Virginia University at Parkersburg – Torie Jackson
- Wheaton College – Philip Ryken
- Whittier College – Kristine Dillon
- Wilberforce University – Vann R. Newkirk, Sr.
- Wichita State University – Richard Muma
- Willamette University – Stephen E. Thorsett
- William Woods University – Romaine Seguin, Acting

=== X ===
- Xavier University (Ohio) – Colleen Hanycz
- Xavier University of Louisiana – Reynold Verret

=== Y ===
- Yale University – Maurie McInnis
- Yeshiva University – Ari Berman
- York College of Pennsylvania – Thomas Burns
- Youngstown State University – Bill Johnson

== Universities with a System President and Chancellors in charge of Branch Campuses ==
- Indiana University – Pamela Whitten, President
  - Indiana University Bloomington – David Reingold, Chancellor
  - Indiana University Columbus – Reinhold Hill, Vice-Chancellor
  - Indiana University East – Dennis Rome, Chancellor
  - Indiana University Fort Wayne – Deborah R. Garrison, Vice-Chancellor
  - Indiana University Indianapolis - Latha Ramchand, Chancellor
  - Indiana University Kokomo – Mark Canada, Chancellor
  - Indiana University Northwest – Ken Iwama, Chancellor
  - Indiana University South Bend – Brian Pappas, Chancellor
  - Indiana University Southeast – Debbie Ford, Chancellor
- Southern Illinois University – Daniel F. Mahony, President
  - Southern Illinois University Carbondale – Austin Lane, Chancellor
  - Southern Illinois University Edwardsville – James T. Minor, Chancellor
- University of Alaska – James R. Johnsen, President
  - University of Alaska Anchorage – Cheryl Siemers, Interim Chancellor
  - University of Alaska Fairbanks – Daniel M. White, Chancellor
  - University of Alaska Southeast – Aparna D. Palmer, Chancellor
- University of Arkansas System – Jay B. Silveria, President
  - University of Arkansas – Charles Robinson, Chancellor
  - University of Arkansas at Pine Bluff – Andrea Stewart, Interim Chancellor
- University of California – James Milliken, President
  - University of California, Berkeley – Richard K. Lyons, Chancellor
  - University of California, Davis – Gary S. May, Chancellor
  - University of California, Irvine – Howard Gillman, Chancellor
  - University of California, Los Angeles – Julio Frenk, Chancellor
  - University of California, Merced – Juan Sánchez Muñoz, Chancellor
  - University of California, Riverside – S. Jack Hu, Chancellor
  - University of California, San Diego – Pradeep Khosla, Chancellor
  - University of California, San Francisco – Sam Hawgood, Chancellor
  - University of California, Santa Barbara – Dennis Assanis, Chancellor
  - University of California, Santa Cruz – Cynthia Larive, Chancellor
- University of Colorado System – Todd Saliman, President
  - University of Colorado Boulder – Justin Schwartz, Chancellor
  - University of Colorado Colorado Springs – Jennifer Sobanet, Chancellor
  - University of Colorado Denver – Kenneth Christensen, Chancellor
- University of Hawaiʻi – Wendy Hensel, President
  - University of Hawaiʻi at Hilo – Bonnie D. Irwin, Chancellor
  - University of Hawaiʻi at Mānoa – N/A, Chancellor
  - University of Hawaiʻi Maui College – Lui Hokoana, Chancellor
- University of Illinois system – Timothy L. Killeen, President
  - University of Illinois at Chicago – Marie Lynn Miranda, Chancellor
  - University of Illinois Springfield – Janet L. Gooch, Chancellor
  - University of Illinois Urbana-Champaign – Charles Lee Isbell Jr., Chancellor
- University of Massachusetts – Marty Meehan, President
  - University of Massachusetts Amherst – Javier Reyes, Chancellor
  - University of Massachusetts Boston – Marcelo Suárez-Orozco, Chancellor
  - University of Massachusetts Dartmouth – Mark A. Fuller, Chancellor
  - University of Massachusetts Lowell – Julie Chen, Chancellor
  - University of Massachusetts Medical School – Michael Collins, Chancellor
- University of Michigan – Domenico Grasso, Interim President
  - University of Michigan–Dearborn – Gabriella Scarlatta, Interim Chancellor
  - University of Michigan–Flint – Laurence B. Alexander, Chancellor
- University of Minnesota – Rebecca Cunningham, President
  - University of Minnesota Crookston – Mary Holz-Clause, Chancellor
  - University of Minnesota Duluth – Charles Nies, Chancellor
  - University of Minnesota Morris – Janet Schrunk Ericksen, Chancellor
  - University of Minnesota Rochester – Lori Carrell, Chancellor
- University of Nebraska system – Jeffrey P. Gold, President
  - University of Nebraska at Kearney – Neal Schnoor, Chancellor
  - University of Nebraska–Lincoln – Rodney Bennett, Chancellor
  - University of Nebraska Medical Center – H. Dele Davies, Interim Chancellor
  - University of Nebraska Omaha – Joanne Li, Chancellor
- University of North Carolina – Peter Hans, President
  - University of North Carolina at Asheville – Kimberly van Noort, Chancellor
  - University of North Carolina at Chapel Hill – Lee Roberts, Chancellor
  - University of North Carolina at Charlotte – Sharon Gaber, Chancellor
  - University of North Carolina at Greensboro – Franklin Gilliam, Chancellor
  - University of North Carolina at Pembroke – Robin Cummings, Chancellor
  - University of North Carolina at Wilmington – Aswani K. Volety, Chancellor
- University of Tennessee system – Randy Boyd, President
  - University of Tennessee – Donde Plowman, Chancellor
  - University of Tennessee at Chattanooga – Lori Mann Bruce, Chancellor
  - University of Tennessee at Martin – Yancy E. Freeman, Chancellor
- University of Wisconsin System – Jay Rothman, President
  - University of Wisconsin–Madison – Jennifer Mnookin, Chancellor
  - University of Wisconsin–Milwaukee – Thomas Gibson, Chancellor

== Universities with a System Chancellor and Presidents in charge of Branch Campuses ==
- Abilene Christian University – Royce Money, Chancellor; Phil Schubert, President
- American InterContinental University – John Kline, Chancellor, Sunitha Araamudhu, President
- California State University System – Mildred García, Chancellor
  - California Polytechnic State University, San Luis Obispo – Jeffrey Armstrong, President
  - California State Polytechnic University, Humboldt – Michael E. Spagna, President
  - California State Polytechnic University, Pomona – Iris S. Levine, Interim President
  - California State University, Bakersfield – Vernon B. Harper Jr., President
  - California State University Channel Islands – Richard Yao, President
  - California State University, Chico – Stephen Perez, President
  - California State University, Dominguez Hills – Thomas A. Parham, President
  - California State University, East Bay – Cathy Sandeen, President
  - California State University, Fresno – Saúl Jiménez-Sandoval, President
  - California State University, Fullerton – Ronald S. Rochon, President
  - California State University, Long Beach – Andrew Jones, President
  - California State University, Los Angeles – Berenecea Eanes, President
  - California State University Maritime Academy – Michael J. Dumont, President
  - California State University, Monterey Bay – Vanya Quiñones, President
  - California State University, Northridge – Erika D. Beck, President
  - California State University, Sacramento – J. Luke Wood, President
  - California State University, San Bernardino – Tomás D. Morales, President
  - California State University San Marcos – Ellen Neufeldt, President
  - California State University, Stanislaus – Britt Rios-Ellis, President
  - San Diego State University – Adela de la Torre, President
  - San Francisco State University – Lynn Mahoney, President
  - San Jose State University – Cynthia Teniente-Matson, President
  - Sonoma State University – Nathan Evans, Acting President
- The City University of New York (CUNY) – Félix V. Matos Rodríguez, Chancellor
  - Baruch College – S. David Wu, President
  - Borough of Manhattan Community College – Anthony Munroe, President
  - Bronx Community College – Thomas A. Isekenegbe, President
  - Brooklyn College – Michelle Anderson, President
  - City College of New York – Vincent Boudreau, President
  - College of Staten Island – Timothy G. Lynch, President
  - Graduate Center, CUNY – Joshua Brumberg, President
  - Guttman Community College – Larry Johnson, Jr., President
  - Hostos Community College – Daisy Cocco De Filippis, President
  - Hunter College – Nancy Cantor, President
  - John Jay College of Criminal Justice – Karol Mason, President
  - Kingsborough Community College – Suri Duitch, Interim President
  - LaGuardia Community College – Kenneth Adams, President
  - Lehman College – Fernando Delgado, President
  - Medgar Evers College – Patricia Ramsey, President
  - New York City College of Technology – Russell K. Hotzler, President
  - Queens College, City University of New York – Frank H. Wu, President
  - Queensborough Community College – Christine Mangino, President
  - William E. Macaulay Honors College – Dara N. Byrne, Dean
  - York College, City University of New York – Claudia V. Schrader, President
- Pennsylvania State System of Higher Education – Christopher M. Fiorentino, Chancellor
  - Cheyney University – Aaron Walton, President
  - Commonwealth University of Pennsylvania – Bashar Hanna, President
  - East Stroudsburg University – Kenneth Long, President
  - Indiana University of Pennsylvania – Michael Driscoll, President
  - Kutztown University – Philip Cavalier, President
  - Millersville University – Daniel Asua Wubah, President
  - Pennsylvania Western University – Jon Anderson, President
  - Shippensburg University – Charles E. Patterson, President
  - Slippery Rock University – Karen Riley, President
  - West Chester University – Laurie Bernotsky, President
- State University of New York System – John King Jr., Chancellor
  - University at Albany – Havidan Rodriguez, President
  - Binghamton University – Harvey G. Stenger, President
  - University at Buffalo – Satish K. Tripathi, President
  - Stony Brook University – Andrea Goldsmith, President
- Texas State University System – Brian McCall, Chancellor
  - Lamar University – Jaime R. Taylor, President
  - Sam Houston State University – Alisa White, President
  - Sul Ross State University – Carlos Hernandez, Interim President
  - Texas State University – Kelly Damphousse, President
- Texas Tech University System – Tedd L. Mitchell, Chancellor
  - Angelo State University – Lt. General Ronnie Hawkins, President
  - Texas Tech University – Lawrence Schovanec, President
  - Texas Tech University Health Sciences Center – Lori Rice-Spearman, President
- University of Alabama System – C. Ray Hayes, Chancellor
  - University of Alabama – Stuart R. Bell, President
  - University of Alabama at Birmingham (UAB) – Ray L. Watts, President
  - University of Alabama in Huntsville (UAH) – Robert Altenkirch, President
- University of Dallas – Edward Burns, Chancellor; Jonathan J. Sanford, President
- University of Houston System – Renu Khator, Chancellor
  - University of Houston – Renu Khator, President
  - University of Houston–Clear Lake – Richard Walker, President
  - University of Houston–Downtown – Loren J. Blanchard, President
- University of Maine System – Dannel Malloy, Chancellor
  - University of Maine – Joan Ferrini-Mundy, President
  - University of Maine at Augusta – Jenifer Cushman, President
  - University of Maine at Farmington – Joseph McDonnell, President
  - University of Maine at Presque Isle – Ray Rice, President
- University System of Maryland – Jay A. Perman, Chancellor
  - University of Maryland, Baltimore – Bruce Jarrel, President
  - University of Maryland, Baltimore County – Valerie Sheares Ashby, President
  - University of Maryland, College Park – Darryll J. Pines, President
  - University of Maryland Eastern Shore – Heidi M. Anderson, President
- University of Texas System – John Zerwas, Chancellor
  - University of Texas at Arlington – Jennifer Evans-Cowley, President
  - University of Texas at Austin – Jim Davis, President
  - University of Texas at Dallas – Prabhas V. Moghe, President
  - University of Texas at El Paso – Heather Wilson, President
  - University of Texas Rio Grande Valley – Guy Bailey, President
  - University of Texas at San Antonio – Thomas Taylor Eignmy, President
  - University of Texas at Tyler – Julie V. Philley, President
  - University of Texas Health Science Center at Houston – Melina Kibbe, President
  - University of Texas Medical Branch – Jochen Reiser, President
  - University of Texas Permian Basin – Sandra Woodley, President

== Universities with a Chancellor ==
- Appalachian State University – Heather Norris
- East Carolina University – Philip Rogers
- Jewish Theological Seminary of America – Shuly Rubin Schwartz
- LSU New Orleans – Jeanette Weiland, Interim
- North Carolina Central University – Karrie G. Dixon
- Syracuse University – Kent Syverud
- Texas Christian University – Daniel W. Pullin
- University of Kansas – Douglas Girod
- University of Mississippi – Glenn Boyce
- University of Missouri – Mun Choi
- University of Pittsburgh – Joan Gabel
- Vanderbilt University – Daniel Diermeier
- Washington State University, Vancouver – Sandra Haynes, Interim
- Washington University in St. Louis – Andrew D. Martin
- Winston-Salem State University – Bonita J. Brown

== See also ==
- Lists of university leaders
