= Beverly Daniel Tatum =

American academic (born 1954)

Beverly Tatum
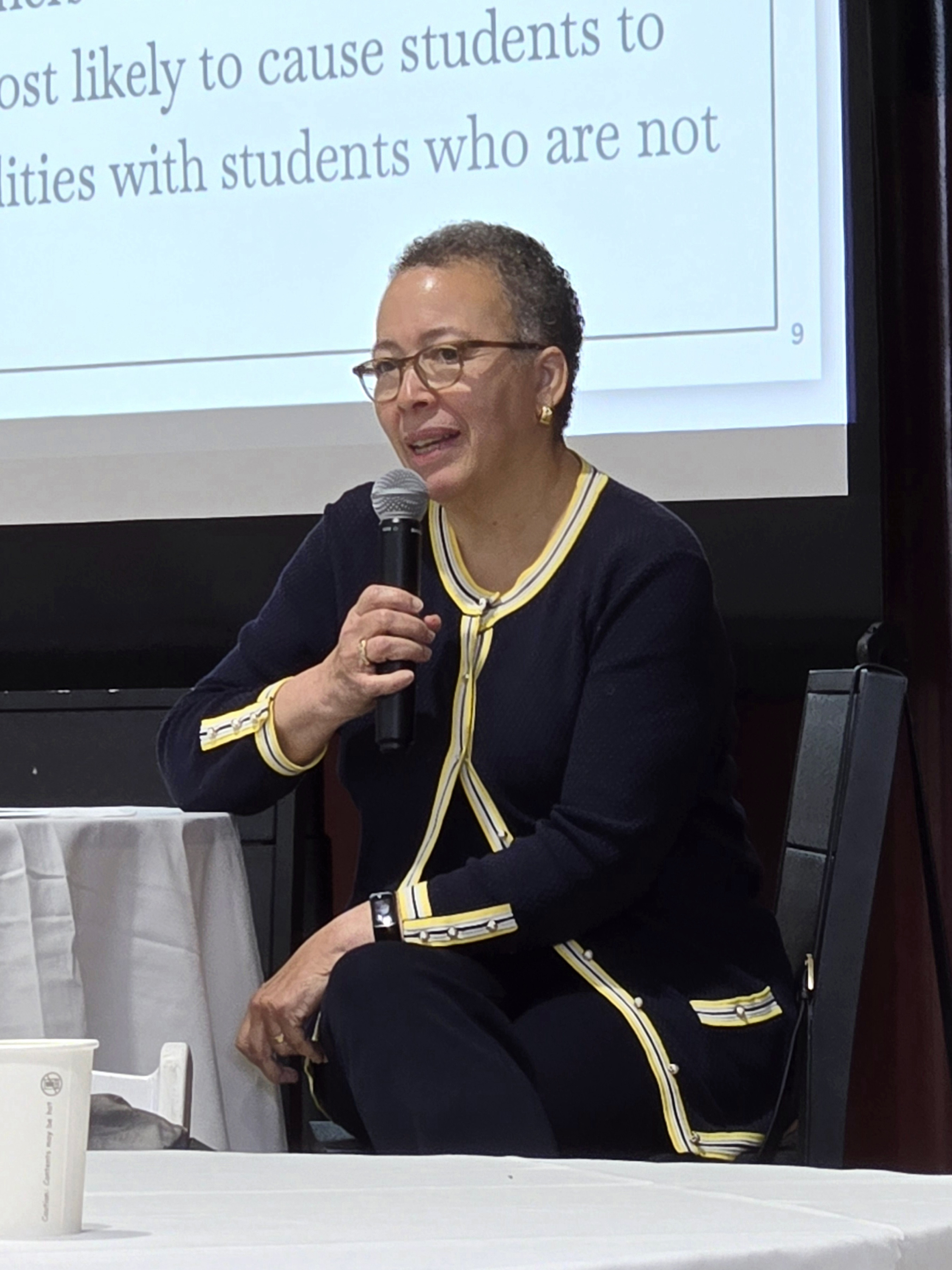
- Tatum in 2025

President of Mount Holyoke College
- Interim
- In office September 1, 2022 – June 30, 2023
- Preceded by: Sonya Stephens
- Succeeded by: Danielle Holley-Walker

9th President of Spelman College
- In office August 1, 2002 – July 31, 2015
- Preceded by: Audrey F. Manley
- Succeeded by: Mary Schmidt Campbell

Personal details
- Born: September 27, 1954 (age 72) Tallahassee, Florida, U.S.
- Children: 2
- Education: Wesleyan University (BA); University of Michigan, Ann Arbor (MA, PhD); Hartford Seminary (MA)
- Website: www.beverlydanieltatum.com

Academic background
- Thesis: (1984)
- Doctoral advisor: Life in isolation: Black families living in a predominantly white community

Academic work
- Discipline: African American studies
- Institutions: University of California at Santa Barbara; Westfield State College; Mount Holyoke College; Spelman College

Beverly Christine Daniel Tatum (born September 27, 1954) is an American psychologist, administrator, and educator who has conducted research and written books on the topic of racism. Focusing specifically on race in education, racial identity development in teenagers, and assimilation of black families and youth in white neighborhoods. Tatum uses works from her students, personal experience, and psychology learning. Tatum served from 2002 to 2015 as the ninth president of Spelman College, the oldest historically black women's college in the United States.

== Early life ==
Tatum was born on September 27, 1954, in Tallahassee, Florida. Her parents were Catherine Faith Maxwell and Robert A. Daniel. Tatum calls herself an "integration baby", having been born only four months after the 1954 Supreme Court ruling on Brown v. Board of Education that outlawed race-based segregation in schools. Tatum grew up in Bridgewater, Massachusetts, where she recalls usually being the only black student in her classes.

Much of her family, including her parents, grandparents, and great-grandparents, attended some of the best historically black colleges and universities, such as the Tuskegee Institute and Howard University.

Tatum graduated high school in 1971 and later earned a B.A. in psychology from Wesleyan University. She also received her M.A. in clinical psychology, in 1976, from the University of Michigan, and a Ph.D. in clinical psychology in 1984, also from the University of Michigan. Much later, in 2000, she received an M.A. in religious studies from Hartford Seminary.

== Academic career ==
Tatum initially taught Black studies at the University of California at Santa Barbara, from 1980 to 1983. She then went on to be a professor of psychology at Westfield State College (1983–1989), and later, she served as a professor of psychology for thirteen years at Mount Holyoke College in South Hadley, Massachusetts. While at Mount Holyoke, she was also appointed as chair of the Psychology Department, dean of the college, vice president for student affairs, and acting president of the college.

In 2002, Tatum became the president of Spelman College, a historically black liberal arts women's college located in Atlanta, Georgia. Her tenure there was marked by many successes, including a 10-year campaign that increased the alumni donation rate up to 41%, and raised $157.8 million.

Tatum has brought her expertise in the realm of racial identity development to lectures, workshops, and panels across the country, even speaking as a panel member at the Summit on Race Relations and America's Public Education System, a publicly broadcast conversation about race relations that was hosted by President Bill Clinton.

In addition to being an educator and author, Tatum also worked as a practicing clinical psychologist, from 1988 to 1998. Her area of expertise were in diversity training and multicultural organizational development, which she would carry out in individual and group sessions.

Tatum was elected to the American Philosophical Society in 2014.

Beverly Daniel Tatum retired in July 2015, as President Emerita of Spelman College. She, now, hopes to focus on work as an author, lecturer, and expert of racial identity development.

In March 2022, it was announced that beginning July 1, 2022, Tatum would return to Mount Holyoke as interim president for one year.

== Race and Education ==
In Beverly Tatum's widely cited article Talking about Race, Learning about Racism: The Application of Racial Identity Development Theory in the Classroom, published in the Harvard Educational Review, she describes her experiences teaching classes on race related issues, and she applies Racial Identity Development Theory as a framework that is useful for understanding common student responses to such topics. She summarizes her career-long commitment to teaching about and leading discussions on race, at various institutions, in the following quote:

"I was convinced that helping students understand the ways in which racism operates in their own lives and what they could do about it, was a social responsibility that I should accept."

Over her many years as an educator, Tatum taught a course titled "Psychology of Racism", eighteen times, at three separate institutions. While the class sizes, the institutions, and the students varied a great deal, Tatum says that classes shared a common thread in how the students tended to react to the material. She describes how students often responded to such topics emotionally, expressing guilt, shame, and anger, all of which had the potential to prevent them from engaging with and appreciating the material.

Tatum argues that students tended to resist the topic of race, in part, because it is considered taboo but also because it clashes with meritocratic ideals that are prominent in America and because white students often fail to recognize that race has meaningfully impacted each of their lives. Tatum explains this resistance further, in terms of William E. Cross, Jr.'s Racial Identity Development Theory, which explores the psychological effects of coming to terms with one's racial group membership. Racial identity theories have been modeled for blacks and whites, but these theories vary, markedly, in terms of the developmental stages by which they are defined.

As a professor, Tatum has observed many students go through these stages of racial identity development and provides quotes from journal entries in which the students react to the class discussions and material over the course of a semester. In presenting these journal entries, Tatum reveals that while students go through their own personal evolution, in response to topics of race, their experiences also tend to map onto racial identity theory, quite well. Tatum argues that the model, while imperfect, is a very useful tool that enables students to frame their experiences in a meaningful way, thereby facilitating positive student development.

Tatum touches on many of these same issues in her popular book, "Why Are All the Black Kids Sitting Together in the Cafeteria?" And Other Conversations About Race. In the book, she offers a detailed overview of racial identity development in black individuals and white individuals and briefly addresses racial identity development of Native Americans, Latinos, and Asian Americans. She draws on vivid personal anecdotes of interactions with her own children and students, as well as empirical literature, to build a case for the relevance and significance of racial identity development in terms of achievement, mental health, and inclusion. Tatum emphasizes the need for educators, parents, and the general public to educate themselves about such topics, in order to meaningfully hold conversations about race, specifically as it relates to education.

== Legacy ==
In 2014, the American Psychological Association presented Beverly Daniel Tatum with the Award for Outstanding Lifetime Contribution to Psychology, the highest honor presented by the APA. The citation for the award stated the following: "you have engaged the very difficult subject of race relations in the United States, and the impact of such an environment on identity development for African Americans." Indeed, Tatum has dedicated much of her career to conversations with the public on the subjects of race and racial identity development. As a result, she has become a nationally renowned expert on such issues and has been invited to speak and conduct workshops at various institutions across the country.

Tatum has also clearly left her mark at Spelman College, where she served as president for 13 years. Since the beginning of her tenure, in 2002, the overall scholarship support for students at Spelman has doubled. Tatum was also involved in the initiative "Going Global", which seeks to develop student intercultural competencies through infrastructural support for Global study travel programs. In 2012, she launched a Wellness Revolution, which was designed to empower students to make healthy choices relating to exercise, diet, and sleep. And in 2014, Tatum helped the college to raise 157.8 million dollars, an amount that far exceeded fundraising goals and was the most money to have been fundraised in the history of the institution.

== Selected works ==
- Tatum, B. (1994). "Teaching White students about racism: The search for White allies and the restoration of hope". The Teachers College Record, 95(4), 462–476.
- Tatum, Beverly D. (1997). "Why Are All The Black Kids Sitting Together in the Cafeteria?": A Psychologist Explains the Development of Racial Identity. Basic Books. ISBN 0-465-08361-7.
- Assimilation Blues: Black Families in a White Community (revised), 2000.
- Tatum, B. D. (2000). "The complexity of identity: Who am I". Readings for Diversity and Social Justice, 9–14.
- Lawrence, S. M., & Tatum, B. D. (2004). "White educators as allies: Moving from awareness to action". In Off white: Readings on power, privilege, and resistance. pp. 362–372.
- Tatum, B. D. (2004). "Family life and school experience: Factors in the racial identity development of Black youth in White communities". Journal of Social Issues, 60(1), 117–135.
- Can We Talk About Race?: And Other Conversations in an Era of School Resegregation. Beacon Press. 2007.

== See also ==
- Presidents and principals of Mount Holyoke College
