= Joe Biden Supreme Court candidates =

Persons nominated or considered for nomination

With the advice and consent of the United States Senate, the president of the United States appoints the members of the Supreme Court of the United States, which is the highest court of the federal judiciary of the United States. Following his victory in the 2020 presidential election, Democrat Joe Biden took office as president on January 20, 2021. During the 2020 Democratic primary campaign, Biden pledged to appoint a Black woman to the Supreme Court, although unlike his opponent, Donald Trump, Biden did not release a specific list of potential nominees during the 2020 general election campaign.

In February 2022, Biden selected Judge Ketanji Brown Jackson to replace Justice Stephen Breyer, who retired at the end of the court's 2022 term.

== Court composition under Biden ==
Name	Appointed	Appointed by	Law school (JD or LLB)
John Roberts (Chief Justice)	2005	George W. Bush	Harvard University
Clarence Thomas	1991	George H. W. Bush	Yale University
Samuel Alito	2006	George W. Bush	Yale University
Sonia Sotomayor	2009	Barack Obama	Yale University
Elena Kagan	2010	Barack Obama	Harvard University
Neil Gorsuch	2017	Donald Trump	Harvard University
Brett Kavanaugh	2018	Donald Trump	Yale University
Amy Coney Barrett	2020	Donald Trump	University of Notre Dame
Ketanji Brown Jackson	2022	Joe Biden	Harvard University

== Nomination of Ketanji Brown Jackson ==
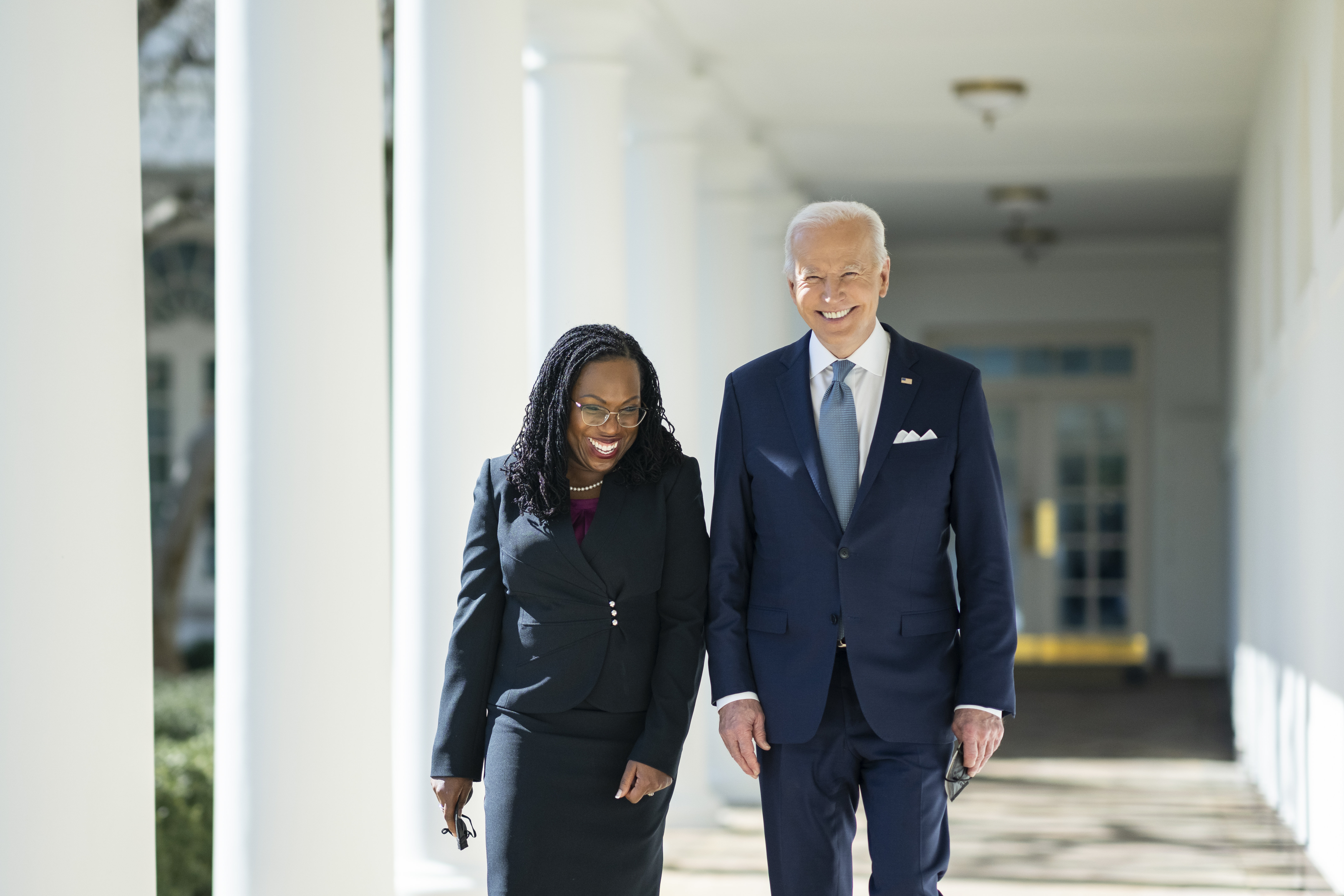
Judge Ketanji Brown Jackson with President Joe Biden in 2022

On January 26, 2022, it was reported that Justice Stephen Breyer planned to step down at the end of the court's current term, giving Biden his first opportunity to name a justice to the court. On January 27, Biden reiterated his intention to keep his campaign promise to nominate a Black woman. On February 22, it was reported that Biden had met with his top three contenders, Ketanji Brown Jackson, J. Michelle Childs and Leondra Kruger. On February 25, it was announced that Biden would nominate Judge Jackson. On April 7, 2022, Jackson was confirmed by a vote of 53–47. She was then sworn in on June 30, 2022, at noon, when Breyer's retirement went into effect.

== Other names mentioned as likely nominees ==
Following is a list of individuals who have been mentioned in various news accounts as possible nominees for a Supreme Court appointment under Biden:

Note: Individuals marked with an asterisk would fulfill Biden's commitment that his first nominee be a Black woman.

=== United States courts of appeals ===
District of Columbia Circuit

- Sri Srinivasan (born 1967)
- J. Michelle Childs* (born 1966) (elevated by Biden)

Second Circuit

- Eunice C. Lee* (born 1970) (appointed by Biden)
- Alison Nathan (born 1972) (elevated by Biden)

Third Circuit

- Arianna J. Freeman* (born 1978) (appointed by Biden)
- Tamika Montgomery-Reeves* (born 1981) (appointed by Biden)

Seventh Circuit

- Candace Jackson-Akiwumi* (born 1979) (appointed by Biden)

Ninth Circuit

- Roopali H. Desai (born 1978) (appointed by Biden)
- Michelle Friedland (born 1972)
- Lucy Koh (born 1968) (elevated by Biden)
- Jacqueline Nguyen (born 1965)
- Holly A. Thomas* (born 1979) (appointed by Biden)
- Paul J. Watford (born 1967) (resigned 2023)

Eleventh Circuit

- Nancy Abudu* (born 1974) (appointed by Biden)

Federal Circuit

- Tiffany P. Cunningham* (born 1976) (appointed by Biden)
- Todd M. Hughes (born 1966)

=== United States District Courts ===
- Leslie Abrams Gardner* (born 1974) – Judge of the Middle District of Georgia
- J. Paul Oetken (born 1965) – Judge of the Southern District of New York
- Wilhelmina Wright* (born 1964) – Judge of the District of Minnesota and former Associate Justice of the Minnesota Supreme Court

=== State Supreme Courts ===
- Cheri Beasley* (born 1966) – former Chief Justice of the North Carolina Supreme Court
- Anita Earls* (born 1960) – Associate Justice of the North Carolina Supreme Court
- Mariano-Florentino Cuéllar (born 1972) — former Associate Justice of the California Supreme Court
- Leondra Kruger* (born 1976) – Associate Justice of the California Supreme Court
- Goodwin Liu (born 1970) – Associate Justice of the California Supreme Court
- Maite Oronoz Rodríguez (born 1976) – Chief Justice of the Supreme Court of Puerto Rico

=== State government officials ===
- Stacey Abrams* (born 1973) – former Minority Leader of the Georgia House of Representatives and 2018 nominee for Governor of Georgia
- Keisha Lance Bottoms* (born 1970) – former Mayor of Atlanta
- Letitia James* (born 1958) – Attorney General of New York

=== Academics ===
- Michelle Alexander* (born 1967) – author and civil rights advocate
- Danielle Holley-Walker* (born c. 1975) – dean of the Howard University School of Law
- Pamela S. Karlan (born 1959) – professor of law at Stanford Law School
- Melissa Murray* (born 1975), professor of law at New York University School of Law
- L. Song Richardson* (born 1966–67), president of Colorado College
- Kenji Yoshino (born 1969) – professor of constitutional law at New York University School of Law

=== Executive branch ===
- Kristen Clarke* (born 1975) – Assistant Attorney General for the Civil Rights Division

=== Other fields ===
- Sherrilyn Ifill* (born 1962) – director-counsel of the NAACP Legal Defense and Educational Fund

== See also ==
- Judicial appointment history for United States federal courts
- List of federal judges appointed by Joe Biden
- United States federal judge
