= Danielle Holley =

American academic (born 1974)

20th President of Mount Holyoke College
- Incumbent
- Assumed office July 1, 2023
- Preceded by: Beverly Daniel Tatum (interim); Sonya Stephens

Personal details
- Born: c. 1974 (age 51–52)
- Education: Yale University (BA); Harvard University (JD)

Danielle R. Holley (born c. 1974) is an American academic administrator who has been the 20th president Mount Holyoke College since 2023. She is the first Black woman in the position.

== Career ==
Holley received a B.A. from Yale University in 1996, and a J.D. from Harvard Law School in 1999. She then served as a law clerk for Chief Judge Carl E. Stewart of the United States Court of Appeals for the Fifth Circuit. Holley served as associate dean for academic affairs at the University of South Carolina School of Law, from which position she was named dean of the Howard University School of Law in 2014. From there she was selected to become Mount Holyoke's 20th President.

Holley is a Liberty Fellow through the Aspen Institute’s Aspen Global Leadership Network. She is also on the board of the Lawyers' Committee for Civil Rights Under Law.

== Selected publications ==
- The Recovery School District Act and New Orleans’ Charter Schools” in LAW & DISASTERS: CHILDREN AND THE LAW AFTER THE KATRINA DISASTER (2008)
- Accountability Charter Schools” in OUR PROMISE: ACHIEVING EDUCATIONAL EQUALITY FOR ALL AMERICA’S CHILDREN (2009)

== See also ==
- List of leaders of universities and colleges in the United States
- Joe Biden Supreme Court candidates
