= Jenifer Cushman =

American academic administrator

President of the University of Maine at Augusta
- Incumbent
- Assumed office July 1, 2023
- Preceded by: Joseph S. Szakas (interim); Michael Laliberte

Chancellor of Penn State Beaver
- In office July 1, 2016 – June 30, 2023
- Preceded by: Carey McDougall (interim); Gary B. Keefer
- Succeeded by: Carey McDougall

Personal details
- Children: 2
- Education: Rhodes College; Ohio State University

Academic background
- Thesis: Unorthodox icons: Russian avant-garde impulses in the works of Rainer Maria Rilke (1996)
- Doctoral advisor: Hugo Bekker

Academic work
- Discipline: German
- Institutions: Togliatti Pedagogical University; University of Minnesota Morris; College of Wooster; Ohio University – Zanesville; Penn State Beaver; University of Maine at Augusta

Jenifer Cushman is an American academic administrator serving as the president of the University of Maine at Augusta since 2023. She was the chancellor and an associate professor of German at Penn State Beaver from 2016 to 2023.

== Life ==
Cushman was raised in the Appalachian area of West Virginia. She earned a B.A. in German and psychology from Rhodes College in 1989. She completed an M.A. (1992) and a Ph.D. (1996) in the department of Germanic languages and literatures at Ohio State University.

In the fall of 1996, Cushman served as a Peace Corps volunteer English instructor at the Togliatti Pedagogical University. From 1996 to 1998, she taught English in Poland including at the Beneficium School of English in Grajewo and the Pedagogical College of Foreign Languages in Suwałki. In August 1998, Cushman joined the University of Minnesota Morris as an assistant professor of German and Russian. She was promoted to associate professor of German with tenure in May 2005. From May 2005 to June 2007, Cushman worked at the College of Wooster as the director of international and off-campus study and an adjunct professor of German. At Juniata College, she was dean of international education and an associate professor of German from June 2007 to March 2014. Cushman was a campus dean and associate professor of German at the Ohio University – Zanesville from March 2014 to June 2016. Cushman was the chancellor and an associate professor of German at Penn State Beaver from July 2016 to June 2023. On July 1, 2023, Cushman became president of the University of Maine at Augusta, succeeding interim president Joseph S. Szakas. Cushman and her husband have two children and reside in Waterville, Maine.
