= Robin Holmes-Sullivan =

American psychologist

26th President of Lewis & Clark College
- Incumbent
- Assumed office July 1, 2022
- Preceded by: Wim Wiewel

Personal details
- Born: Robin Helene Holmes; September 24, 1964 (age 61) South Carolina, U.S.
- Education: California State University, Fullerton (BA, MA); California School of Professional Psychology (MA, PhD)

Robin Helene Holmes-Sullivan (born September 24, 1964) is an American academic and psychologist serving as the president of Lewis & Clark College. She is the first woman, first person of color, and first openly LGBTQ person to become the president of the college. Holmes-Sullivan previously served as the vice president for student affairs of the 10-campus University of California system.

== Early life and education ==
Robin Helene Holmes was born on September 24, 1964 in South Carolina. She is the fourth of five children. Her family frequently moved because her father was in the United States Marine Corps. After her father was stationed at the Marine Corps Air Station El Toro when she was 3-years-old, her family stayed in California. Holmes-Sullivan graduated from El Toro High School in 1982.

Holmes-Sullivan attended California State University, Fullerton (CSUF), where she studied psychology. She was the starting point guard for CSUF's NCAA Division I women's basketball team. Her goal was to play for the USA women's basketball team in the 1988 Olympics. Holmes-Sullivan continues to hold the Big West championship record for best free throw percentage (tied with Natasha Parks of the University of California, Irvine and Alli Nieman of the University of Idaho).

After receiving her Bachelor of Arts in psychology in 1986, Holmes-Sullivan continued to get a Master of Arts in psychology from CSUF. She later attended the California School of professional Psychology where she received a Master of Arts in 1990 and a Doctor of Philosophy (Ph.D.) in 1992, both in clinical psychology.

== Career ==
Holmes-Sullivan began her career at the counseling center at the University of Oregon, where she later became the dean of students and the vice president of student life.

After 25 years at the University of Oregon, Holmes-Sullivan became the vice president for student affairs of the University of California, a 10-campus university system with more than 200,000 students.

Holmes-Sullivan later became the vice president for student life and dean of students of Lewis & Clark College. She was praised for her management of the COVID-19 pandemic and its effect on the student body.

In January 2022, Lewis & Clark College announced that Holmes-Sullivan would become the president of the college the following July. She became the first woman, first person of color, and the first openly LGBTQ person to hold the position.

In September 2022, State Treasurer Tobias Reed appointed Holmes-Sullivan to the five-member Oregon 529 Savings Board. The board oversees the administration of the Oregon College Savings Plan and advises the state administration on the Oregon ABLE Savings Plan.

In March 2024, the Portland Business Journal honored Holmes-Sullivan as a "Woman of Influence."

Holmes-Sullivan maintains a career as a private clinical psychologist. She specializes in treating anxiety, depression, and LGBTQ clients. Holmes-Sullivan is also a consultant for multicultural organizational development and diversity issues.

== Personal life ==
Holmes-Sullivan is gay. She met her wife, Kathy Sullivan, in 1993 while working in the counseling center at the University of Oregon. Kathy is a clinical social worker. They raised their two sons in Eugene, Oregon.
