= Alvernia University =

Catholic university in Reading, Pennsylvania, U.S.

- Former name: Alvernia College (1958–2008)
- Motto: Latin: Doceat Christus vos facere.
- Motto in English: May Christ Teach You To Do
- Type: Private university
- Established: 1958
- Religious affiliation: Roman Catholic (Bernardine Sisters)
- Academic affiliations: ACCU; AFCU; CIC; NAICU
- President: Glynis Fitzgerald
- Students: 2,796 (fall 2024)
- Undergraduates: 2,314 (fall 2024)
- Postgraduates: 482 (fall 2024)
- Location: Reading, Pennsylvania, U.S. 40.309°N 75.936°W
- Campus: Suburban, 121 acres (49.0 ha)
- Colors: Maroon and gold
- Sporting affiliations: NCAA Division III – MAC Commonwealth Conference, ECAC
- Mascot: Golden Wolves
- Website: www.alvernia.edu

Alvernia University is a private Franciscan university in Reading, Pennsylvania. Founded as Alvernia College in 1958 by the Bernardine Sisters of St. Francis, the school gained university status in 2008.

== History ==
Alvernia University was founded in 1958 by the Bernardine Sisters of the Third Order of St. Francis first as college for the sisters, and then as a four-year liberal arts college. Many of the college's renovated classrooms and offices had been used for elementary and secondary education before 1958. The college's first building, Francis Hall, was built in 1926 and originally housed an orphanage. Alvernia received its charter from the Commonwealth of Pennsylvania in 1960 and was first accredited in 1967 by the Commission of Middle States Association of Colleges and Secondary Schools. In 1961, the college accepted its first lay female students. In 1971, it admitted its first male commuting students, and in 1973, the first male resident students were admitted.

In 2008, Alvernia College celebrated its 50th anniversary and was granted university status, taking on the name Alvernia University, by the Pennsylvania Department of Education.

== Academics ==
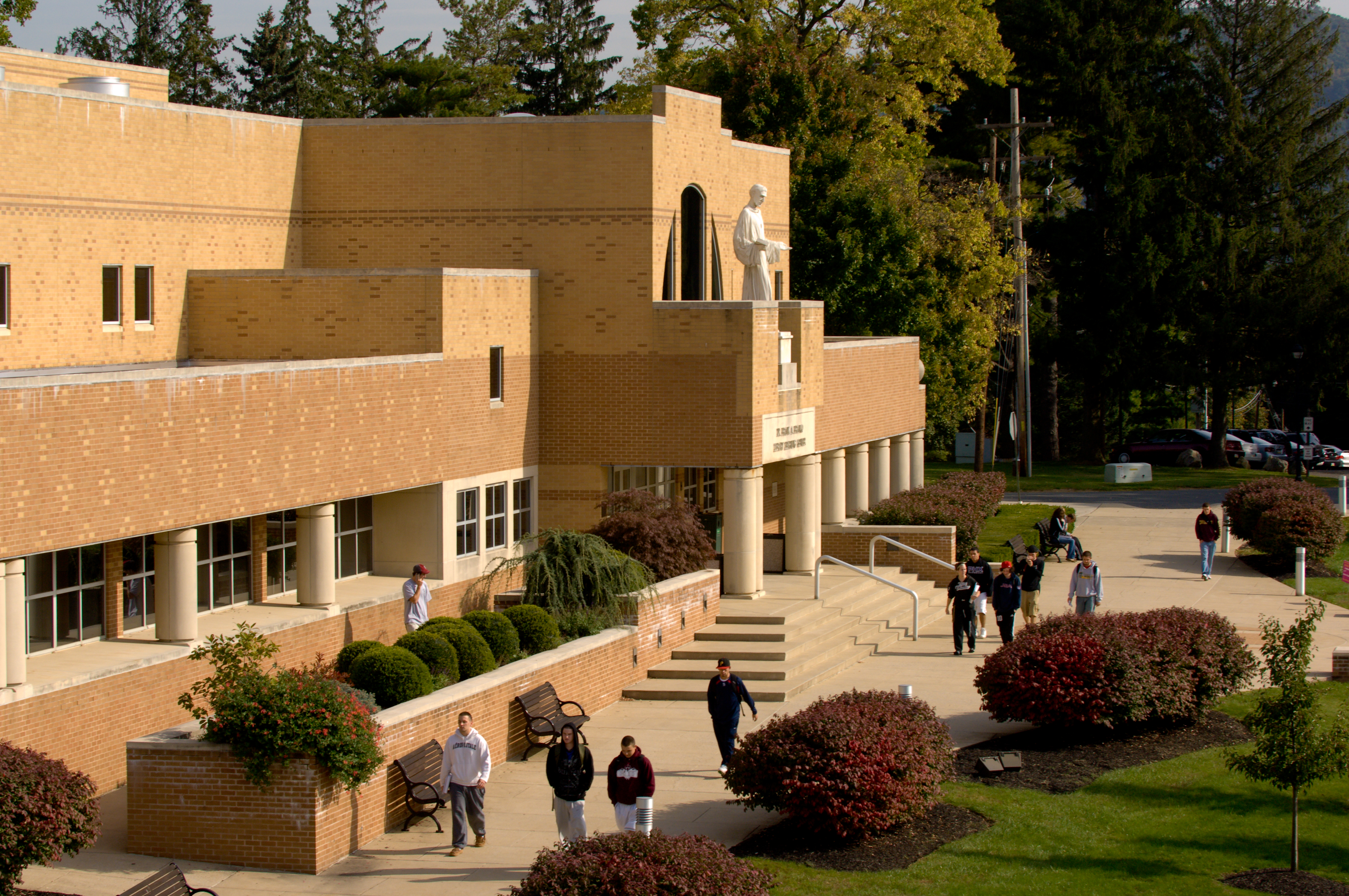
Alvernia University Franco Library

Alvernia offers more than 50 undergraduate majors and minors. Pre-professional programs are available in dentistry, law, medicine, pharmacy, and veterinary studies. Master's degrees are awarded in occupational therapy, business administration, nursing, community counseling, education, and liberal studies. Alvernia offers a seven-year Doctorate in Physical Therapy (DPT) program. A Doctor of Philosophy in leadership is also available.

Since 1967, the Middle States Association of Colleges and Schools or its successor has granted Alvernia accreditation. The Education program for elementary and secondary teachers is approved by the Pennsylvania Department of Education. The Occupational Therapy program is fully accredited by the American Council of Occupational Therapy Education (ACOTE). The Bachelor of Science in Nursing has approval by the Pennsylvania State Board of Nursing and is accredited by the Commission on Collegiate Nursing Education (CCNE). The Athletic Training program is accredited by the Commission on Accreditation of Allied Health Education Programs in cooperation with the Joint Review Committee on Educational Programs in Athletic Training. The Social Work program is accredited by the Council on Social Work Education (CSWE). The Behavioral Health courses are certified by the Pennsylvania Certification Board. The Business Department is accredited by the Accreditation Council for Business Schools and Programs (ACBSP).

=== Library ===
Library holdings include 100,000 print, audiovisual, and computer materials; approximately 900 periodicals; and 400 current subscriptions. The library supports Polish-American and Italian-American cultural centers.

== List of presidents ==
- Sr. Mary Zygmunta (1958-1970)
- Sr. Mary Victorine Cieslukowski (1971-1982)
- Sr. Mary Dolorey Osowski (1982-1990)
- Dr. Daniel DeLucca (1990-1997)
- Dr. Laurence W. Mazzeno (1997-2005)
- Dr. Thomas F. Flynn (2005-2019)
- John R. Loyack (2019-2023)
- Glynis Fitzgerald (2023-present)

== Athletics ==
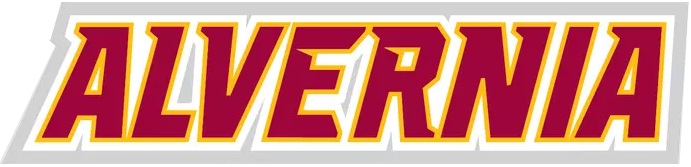
Alvernia athletics wordmark

Alvernia's intercollegiate teams, now known as the Golden Wolves but previously known as the Crusaders, compete at the NCAA Division III level in the Middle Atlantic Conferences (MAC) and the Eastern College Athletic Conference. Men's sports include football (since 2018), wrestling (since 2019), baseball, basketball, cross country, golf, ice hockey, lacrosse, soccer, tennis, track & field and volleyball; while women's sports include basketball, cheerleading, cross country, dance, field hockey, ice hockey, golf, lacrosse, soccer, softball, tennis, track & field, volleyball, and wrestling.
