= Emily S. Gurley =

American epidemiologist

- Education: Oglethorpe University (BA); Emory University (MPH); Johns Hopkins Bloomberg School of Public Health (PhD)
- Scientific career
- Fields: Epidemiology
- Workplaces: ICDDR, B Johns Hopkins Bloomberg School of Public Health

Emily Suzanne Gurley is an American epidemiologist. She is a distinguished professor of the practice in the department of epidemiology at the Johns Hopkins Bloomberg School of Public Health.

== Education ==
Gurley completed a BA at Oglethorpe University in 1996 and a MPH from Emory University in 2002. She earned a PhD from Johns Hopkins Bloomberg School of Public Health in 2012. Her dissertation was titled, Indoor Exposure to Particulate Matter and Acute Lower Respiratory Infections in Young Children in Urban Bangladesh.

== Career and research ==
Gurley began conducting public health research at the ICDDR, B in 2003 where she remained for 12 years. She worked with the Centers for Disease Control and Prevention and the Government of Bangladesh to create a surveillance program for meningoencephalitis, respiratory tract infection, gastroenteritis, and hospital-acquired infection. Gurley also lead the surveillance and outbreak investigation unit and was the director of the emerging infections program. Beginning in 2004, she researched the ecology and epidemiology of nipah virus infections. She works in transmission, disease burden, and epidemiology of diseases preventable by vaccines. Gurley uses the One Health framework to research infectious disease prevention and the ecology of human diseases.

Gurley is a Professor of the Practice in the Department of Epidemiology at Johns Hopkins Bloomberg School of Public Health. She has a joint affiliation in the Global Disease Epidemiology and Control (GDEC) Division in the Department of International Health.
