= Nescit cedere =

Nescit cedere is Latin for "He does not know how to give up." It is also the motto of Oglethorpe University, in reference to the school's namesake, James Oglethorpe, who allegedly persevered through seemingly inconquerable obstacles in order to found the colony of Georgia. It was adapted from the Oglethorpe family crest.
