= Glynis Fitzgerald =

American academic administrator

8th President of Alvernia University
- Incumbent
- Assumed office July 1, 2023
- Preceded by: John Loyack

Personal details
- Education: Edinboro University; University at Buffalo

Glynis A. Fitzgerald is an American academic administrator serving as the president of Alvernia University since 2023. She was previously full professor in the department of communications at Central Connecticut State University.

== Life ==
Fitzgerald completed a bachelor's degree in speech communication from the Edinboro University. She earned a master's degree and Ph.D. in organizational communication and a doctorate in organizational and interpersonal communication from University at Buffalo.

Fitzgerald was a full professor in the department of communication at Central Connecticut State University. She also served as the dean of the school of graduate studies and associate vice president of academic affairs. In 2019, she joined Alvernia University as its provost and senior vice president. In February 2023, she was selected as the 8th president of Alvernia. She succeeded John Loyack on July 1, 2023, becoming its first female lay president. In October 2024 Alvernia announced that her term as president would be extended through 2029.
