= Cathy Sandeen =

American academic administrator

Cathy A. Sandeen
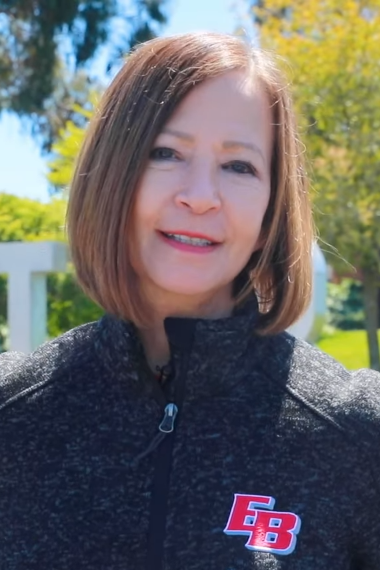
- Sandeen in 2021

6th President California State University, East Bay
- Incumbent
- Assumed office January 4, 2021
- Preceded by: Leroy M. Morishita

11th Chancellor of the University of Alaska Anchorage
- In office September 15, 2018 – January 3, 2021
- Preceded by: Samuel B. Gingerich (interim)
- Succeeded by: Sean Parnell

Chancellor of the University of Wisconsin Colleges
- In office 2014–2018

Personal details
- Education: Humboldt State University (BA; San Francisco State University (MA); University of California, Los Angeles (MBA); University of Utah (PhD)

Cathy Sandeen is an American academic administrator who has served as University President at California State University, East Bay in Hayward since January 2021. On May 20, 2026, she announced her resignation effective in December 2026.

== Early life and education ==
Sandeen was born in Oakland and raised in San Leandro, California. Sandeen earned a bachelor's degree in speech-language pathology from Humboldt State University and a master's degree in broadcast communication from San Francisco State University. She then earned a Master of Business Administration from the UCLA Anderson School of Management and a Ph.D in communication from the University of Utah.

== Career ==
Prior to joining the University of Alaska, Sandeen served as the chancellor of the University of Wisconsin Colleges and University of Wisconsin–Extension. Sandeen previously served as dean of Continuing Education at UCLA Extension from 2006 to 2012, and vice provost and dean of the University Extension and summer session at University of California, Santa Cruz from 2000 to 2006. On October 29, 2020 the California State University Board of Trustees announced Dr. Sandeen's appointment as President of California State University East Bay, with her term beginning January 4, 2021.
