= Kathryn McClymond =

American historian of religions and academic administrator (born 1960)

18th President of Oglethorpe University
- Incumbent
- Assumed office November 2023; Interim: June 2023 – November 2023
- Preceded by: Nick Ladany

Personal details
- Born: October 13, 1960 (age 65) Washington, D.C., U.S.
- Education: Harvard College; University of California, Santa Barbara

Kathryn T. McClymond (born October 13, 1960) is an American historian of religions and academic administrator serving as the 18th president of Oglethorpe University since 2023.

== Early life and education ==
McClymond was born on October 13, 1960, in Washington, D.C. She is from Pittsburgh. She earned a B.A., cum laude, in history and literature from Harvard College in 1982. In 1985, she earned a M.A. from the Trinity Divinity School. She completed a M.A. (1995) and Ph.D. (1999) in religious studies at the University of California, Santa Barbara. Her 1999 dissertation was titled In the Matter of Sacrifice: A Comparative Study of Vedic and Jewish Sacrifice. Barbara A. Holdrege was her doctoral advisor.

== Career ==
McClymond is a historian of religions who is specialized in Hinduism and Judaism. She is a scholar of religious studies, particularly in the areas of sacrifice and ritual. She began her academic career at Georgia State University (GSU), where she joined the faculty in the department of religious studies in 1999. Over the years, she has taken on numerous roles within the department, including serving as the Religious Studies Graduate Director from 2005 to 2008, and later as chair of the department starting in 2008. In 2013, she was elected a member of the American Society for the Study of Religion. She served as associate dean for faculty affairs in the College of Arts and Sciences. Throughout her 22 years there, she contributed to the development of faculty resources and academic initiatives. She is recognized for her scholarly work in the field of comparative religions, authoring numerous articles and books. Among her contributions is a co-edited volume examining how humanities disciplines inform research on moral injury among veterans.

Her research has explored topics such as sacrifice, violence, and the intersection of religion and society. McClymond is the author of several monographs, including Beyond Sacred Violence: A Comparative Study of Sacrifice (2008) and Ritual Gone Wrong: What We Learn from Ritual Disruption (2016). The former work earned her the Georgia Author of the Year Award in 2009. McClymond has also contributed to academic journals and edited volumes, offering insights into a wide range of topics such as moral injury, religious violence, and ritual correction in both ancient and modern contexts. She has participated in collaborative projects, including the Religious Sounds Map Project, which aims to document and archive religious sounds from metropolitan Atlanta, and the Moral Well-Being/Moral Injury Project, designed to develop tools to address moral injury in military veterans.

On July 19, 2021, McClymond joined Oglethorpe University as its provost and vice president of academic affairs. On June 3, 2023, became its interim president. In November 2023, she was appointed the 18th president of Oglethorpe University, becoming the institution’s first female president. McClymond was named its 18th president, succeeding Nicholas Ladany. She has held leadership roles within the broader academic community, serving on the boards of directors for both the American Academy of Religion and the American Society for the Study of Religion.

== Personal life ==
McClymond has shared that her mother, a college professor, had a significant impact on her career trajectory, fostering an early appreciation for education. This influence has shaped her view of higher education as a means of investing in the personal and academic growth of students.

== Selected works ==
- McClymond, Kathryn (2008). Beyond Sacred Violence: A Comparative Study of Sacrifice. Johns Hopkins University Press. ISBN 978-0-8018-8776-5.
- McClymond, Kathryn (2016). Ritual Gone Wrong: What We Learn from Ritual Disruption. Oxford University Press. ISBN 978-0-19-979091-3.
