= Justin Schwartz =

American nuclear engineer, academic

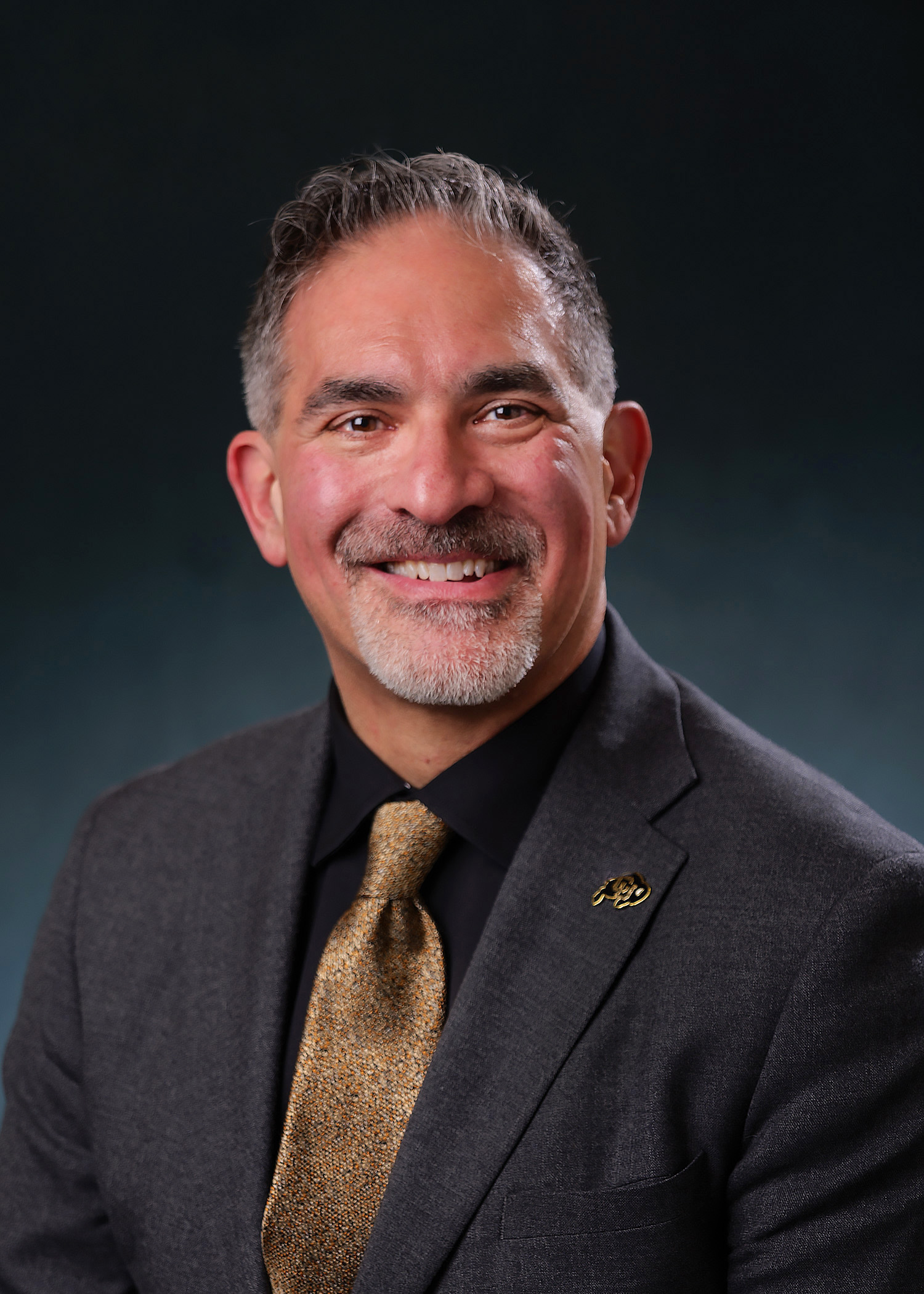

12th Chancellor of the University of Colorado Boulder
- Incumbent
- Assumed office July 1, 2024
- Preceded by: Phil DiStefano

Personal details
- Born: February 9, 1965 (age 61) Park Ridge, Illinois, U.S.
- Education: University of Illinois, Urbana-Champaign (BS); Massachusetts Institute of Technology (MS, PhD)
- Scientific career
- Fields: Nuclear engineering
- Workplaces: University of Colorado, Boulder; Penn State College of Engineering; North Carolina State University; Florida State University; University of Illinois, Urbana-Champaign; National Institute for Materials Science
- Thesis: Design and Stability of a High Field Toroidal Field Coil Using Advanced Materials (1990)

Justin Schwartz (born February 9, 1965) is an American nuclear engineer and chancellor at the University of Colorado Boulder, a position he has held since July 1, 2024. He has spent his career as a researcher, educator, entrepreneur and academic leader.

From August 2022 until his appointment at CU Boulder, Schwartz was the interim and then permanent executive vice president and provost at The Pennsylvania State University. He previously served as Harold and Inge Marcus Dean at Penn State College of Engineering from 2017 to 2022 and head of the Department of Materials Science and Engineering at North Carolina State University from 2009 to 2017.

== Early life and education ==
Schwartz was born in Park Ridge, Illinois. He earned a bachelor’s degree in nuclear engineering in 1985 from the University of Illinois at Urbana-Champaign with highest honors and a doctorate in nuclear engineering in 1990 from the Massachusetts Institute of Technology.

== Career ==
After graduation, he relocated briefly to Japan, where he served at the National Research Institute for Metals as one of the first Science and Technology Agency of Japan Fellows.

After returning to the United States, he worked at his undergraduate alma mater as an assistant professor.

In 1993, he joined the mechanical engineering faculty at Florida A&M University-Florida State University College of Engineering. There he led the High Temperature Superconductor Magnets and Materials Group within FSU’s newly launched National High Magnetic Field Laboratory.

In 2004, his group, in collaboration with Oxford Superconductor Technologies, established a world record by generating a 25.04 T magnetic field with a superconducting insert magnet, among other accomplishments. Schwartz served as Jack E. Crow Professor of Engineering from 2005 until his departure in 2009.

In 2009, Schwartz was named head of the Department of Materials Science and Engineering and Kobe Steel Distinguished Professor at North Carolina State University, a position he held until joining Penn State in 2017.

Schwartz served as Harold and Inge Marcus Dean of Engineering at Penn State College of Engineering from 2017 to 2022 before accepting a role as interim executive vice chancellor and provost. The position became permanent in May 2023.

While at Penn State, Schwartz launched efforts to diversify faculty, close demographic gaps in student success and improve holistic student experiences. He created an Interdisciplinary Schools Task Force to bring together multiple colleges and campuses to offer programs in cross-cutting areas such as sustainability and artificial intelligence.

In April 2024, the University of Colorado Board of Regents voted unanimously to name Schwartz the chancellor of the University of Colorado Boulder with a three-year contract. He was preceded as chancellor by Philip P. DiStefano, who served 15 years in the position.

“CU Boulder will have a dynamic new leader with an outstanding vision who will build upon an impressive foundation already in place,” CU System President Todd Saliman said in a statement announcing the decision. “He appreciates our deeply held commitment to our mission of serving Colorado, Coloradans and society.”

== Research ==
Schwartz’s research focuses on the performance and system integration of superconducting magnets, optical fiber distributed sensors, and magnetic and multiferroic materials. The field integrates physics and chemistry with mechanical, electrical, magnetic, thermal and systems issues and has applications for systems important to defense, energy, medicine and basic science.

Schwartz has published more than 300 papers, has seven issued patents and served as principal or co-principal investigator for more than $23 million in research while advising 50 graduate students.

He founded and led two startup companies from his research: Lupine Materials & Technology (founder and CEO, 2015-present) and Eagle Power Technologies (co-founder and CTO, 2015-2021).

== Awards and honors ==
- Distinguished Alumni Award, University of Illinois Urbana-Champaign, Department of Nuclear, Plasma and Radiological Engineering, 2024
- National Academy of Inventors, 2023
- John Bardeen Award, TMS Functional Materials Division, 2018
- Fellow, ASM International, 2015
- Fellow, American Association for the Advancement of Science, 2015
- Award for Continuing and Significant Contributions in the Field of Applied Superconductivity, IEEE Council on Superconductivity, 2014
