= Togliatti State University =

Public university

- Тольяттинский государственный университет
- Motto: ТГУ — мир твоих возможностей
- Motto in English: TSU is the world of your capabilities
- Established: May 29, 2001
- Location: Russia; 53.5005322°N 49.3979573°E
- Website: www.tltsu.ru
- Building details

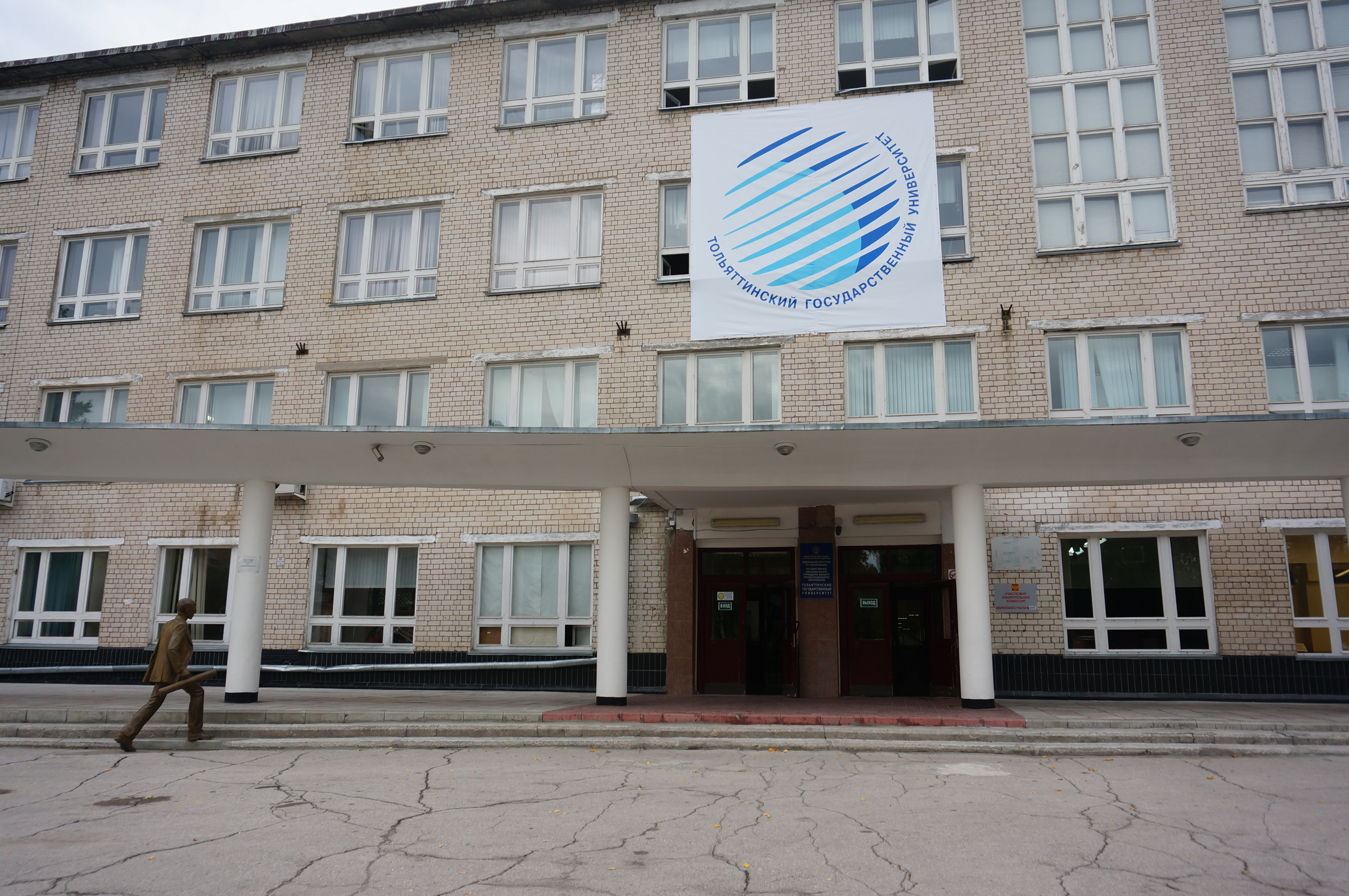

University rankings

Regional – Overall
- QS Emerging Europe and Central Asia: 351-400 (2022)

Togliatti State University (TSU) is a public research university located in Samara Oblast, Russia. It was established on May 29, 2001, as a result of the merger between the Togliatti Polytechnic Institute (founded in 1951) and the Togliatti Branch of Samara State Pedagogical University (founded in 1988). Today, the university is home to over 12,000 students, and 67,000 have graduated from it since its founding.

== Institutions ==
TSU comprises ten Colleges, or "Institutes", namely the Institute of Mechanical Engineering, the Institute of Humanities and Pedagogy, the Institute of Architecture and Construction, the Institute of Finance, Economics and Management, the Institute of Mathematics, Physics and Information Technologies, the Institute of Fine, Decorative and Applied Arts, the Institute of Physical Education and Sports, the Institute of Chemistry and Engineering Ecology, the Institute of Electrical and Power Engineering, and the Institute of Law.
