= Bernardine Sisters of St. Francis =

Roman Catholic religious order based in Pennsylvania, United States

The Bernardine Sisters of St. Francis are a Catholic apostolic congregation of pontifical right based in Reading, Pennsylvania. The order was founded in 1894 by Mother Veronica Grzedowska, a Polish nun from Zakliczyn, for the instruction of poor girls in a parish in Mount Carmel. As of 2010, the order had more than 380 members in more than 50 houses.

== Ministries ==
The following are among this organization's areas of ministry:

- Education (early, elementary, secondary, special, and higher)
- Elder care
- Foreign missions
- Healthcare
- Homecare
- Ministry (diocesan, pastoral, retreat, social)
- Outreach to the poor
- Prison ministry
