= Phil Schubert =

President of Abilene Christian University, Abilene, Texas

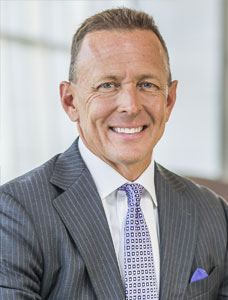
Phil Schubert

Philip J. Schubert is the eleventh and current president of Abilene Christian University, Abilene, Texas. Schubert's appointment was publicly announced on February 12, 2010, and he formally took office June 1, 2010, succeeding Royce Money. Schubert's inauguration celebration took place in 2010.

== Early career ==
Before joining Abilene Christian University in 1993, Schubert worked as an auditor for Arthur Andersen & Co. in Dallas, Texas. His time at ACU began in the Student Financial Services department as a director. On October 19, 1998, Abilene Christian University named him the chief financial officer after five years of employment.

== Education ==
Schubert received his bachelor's degree in accounting from Abilene Christian University in 1991, master's degree in business administration from Duke University in 2006, and Ed.D from the University of Pennsylvania in 2009. His doctoral dissertation was entitled "Assessing the correlation between longitudinal changes in U.S. News & World Report Collegiate Rankings and the broader institutional experience from 1999 to 2007".

== Personal life ==
Schubert attends Highland Church of Christ in Abilene.

In 2014, Schubert and his wife of 22 years divorced citing "irreconcilable differences."

Schubert is currently married to Brooke Owen Schubert and is the father of three children from his first marriage.

Schubert had two older brothers who also attended ACU: David and Kelly Schubert. His father, Joe D. Schubert, Ed.D., was a dean of students at Oklahoma Christian College in the late 1960s and a well-known preacher in the Churches of Christ, including Bammel Road Church of Christ in Houston, which was the first congregation to collect over $1 million in a single Sunday special contribution.
