= Oglethorpe University =

Private college in Brookhaven, Georgia, US

- Former name: Oglethorpe College (1965–1972)
- Motto: Nescit Cedere
- Type: Private liberal arts college
- Established: 1835; 191 years ago
- Endowment: $55.1 million (2025)
- President: Kathryn McClymond
- Students: 1,500
- Location: Brookhaven, Georgia, United States; 33.875°N 84.333°W
- Campus: 700 acres (2.8 km^{2}); Suburban
- Colors: Black and gold
- Nickname: Stormy Petrels
- Sporting affiliations: NCAA Division III – SAA
- Mascot: Petey
- Website: oglethorpe.edu

- Oglethorpe University Historic District
- U.S. National Register of Historic Places
- U.S. Historic district
- Location within Metro Atlanta Location within Georgia Location within the United States
- Location: 4484 Peachtree Rd. NE. Brookhaven, Georgia United States
- Built: 1915, 1929, 1940
- Architect: Leavitt, Charles W. Jr., Morgan and Dillon
- Architectural style: Late Gothic Revival
- NRHP reference No.: 94000779
- Added to NRHP: 1994

Oglethorpe University is a private liberal arts college in Brookhaven, Georgia, United States. It was chartered in 1835 and named in honor of General James Edward Oglethorpe, founder of the Colony of Georgia.

== History ==
Oglethorpe University was chartered in 1835 in Midway (now known as Hardwick), Georgia just south of Milledgeville, then the state capital. The school was built and, at that time, governed by the Presbyterian Church, making it one of the South's earliest denominational institutions. The American Civil War led to the school's closing in 1862.

The college followed the relocation of the capital to Atlanta. In 1870, it began holding classes at the present site of Atlanta City Hall. Plagued by financial difficulties, the school closed its doors for a second time in 1872.

Oglethorpe College was re-chartered as a non-denominational institution in 1913 by Thornwell Jacobs, whose grandfather Ferdinand Jacobs had served on the faculty of Old Oglethorpe. In 1915, the cornerstone to the new campus was laid at its present location on Peachtree Road in Brookhaven. The cornerstone-laying ceremony took place at North Avenue Presbyterian Church. Jacobs would serve as president for nearly 30 years.

In the early 1940s Oglethorpe University had a medical school. Under the direction of John Bernard, the university was given several elephants for research that were discovered to have been poisoned at a Ringling Brothers Barnum & Bailey Circus event nearby. After the students finished dissecting the animals they were buried under what is known today as the Philip Weltner Library.

In 1936, William Randolph Hearst gifted 400 acres (160 ha) to the university, and in 1948 he made a donation of $100,000; the university administration building was subsequently named in honor of Hearst's mother, Phoebe Hearst.

Oglethorpe University became Oglethorpe College in 1965, and reclaimed the designation "university" in 1972. Oglethorpe's campus buildings were built in a Gothic revival architecture style. This area of the 100-acre (40 ha) campus is listed in the National Register of Historic Places.

== Academics ==
The college is accredited by the Southern Association of Colleges and Schools.

== Coat of arms ==
Oglethorpe's collegiate coat-of-arms is emblazoned with three boars' heads and the Latin inscription Nescit Cedere, meaning "He does not know how to give up."

== Campus ==
The carillon bells atop Oglethorpe's Lupton Hall

The Conant Performing Arts Center, completed in 1997, served as the seasonal home of Georgia Shakespeare until fall 2014.

The Oglethorpe University Museum of Art opened in 1984 and is located on the top floor of the Philip Weltner Library. The two galleries, the South and Skylight, and gift shop cover 7,000 square feet. Bringing in thousands of visitors each year, the museum has become an important point of interest in Atlanta's art community.

In 1994, Lupton Hall, Phoebe Hearst Hall, Lowry Hall and Hermance Stadium were added to the National Register of Historic Places. In addition, a historic district including part or all of the 100-acre (0.40 km^{2}) campus was listed on the National Register of Historic Places.

Other academic buildings include Goslin Hall, primarily used for science courses, and J. Mack Robinson Hall, primarily used for Communication and Art classes.

Oglethorpe University is home to the Crypt of Civilization, the first and most complete time capsule ever created, according to the Guinness Book of World Records. Scheduled to be opened in AD 8113, it is located in the basement of Phoebe Hearst Hall. Oglethorpe University is also home to the International Time Capsule Society, a repository of time capsule projects worldwide.

The Turner Lynch Campus Center opened in the fall of 2013. The IW "Ike" Cousins Center for Science and Innovation (an expansion of a building constructed in 1970) opened in 2019. In addition to science facilities, it houses the Q. William Hammack Jr. School of Business.

From its opening in 1990 until 2003, the Seigakuin Atlanta International School was located on the property of Oglethorpe University, in a former public school building. Also from 1974 to 1981, Georgia Japanese Language School was located on campus before it moved to another property.

== Events and traditions ==
=== Oglethorpe Day ===
In early February, the college hosts events to celebrate the anniversary of James Oglethorpe's founding of the colony of Georgia. The annual "Petrels of Fire" race, an homage to Trinity College's Great Court Run portrayed in the movie Chariots of Fire, features students attempting to run the 270-yard (250 m) perimeter of the Academic Quad before the Lupton Hall belltower finishes its noon chimes.

=== Boar's Head ===
Held on the first Friday of December, this event is modeled after the Boar's Head Gaudy of Queen's College, Oxford, Boar's Head is the traditional start to the Christmas season at Oglethorpe. Festivities include a concert featuring the University Singers, student organizations and performers from the community, as well as the lighting of the college's Christmas tree. Newly initiated members of Omicron Delta Kappa receive recognition and, as a rite of initiation, kiss the ceremonial boar's head.

=== Honorary degrees ===
Like many colleges, Oglethorpe has a rich history of awarding honorary degrees at the annual commencement ceremony. During his presidency, Thornwell Jacobs gave out as many as thirteen per year. Some recipients over the past two hundred years include US presidents Woodrow Wilson (1920) and Franklin D. Roosevelt (1932), aviator Amelia Earhart (1935), civil rights leaders and ambassador Andrew Young (1990), animator Chuck Jones (1993), film director Vincent Sherman (1997), restauranteur S. Truett Cathy (1997), poet Linda Bierds (2010), environmentalist Ted Turner (2015), and actor Christopher Jackson (2018).

== Athletics ==
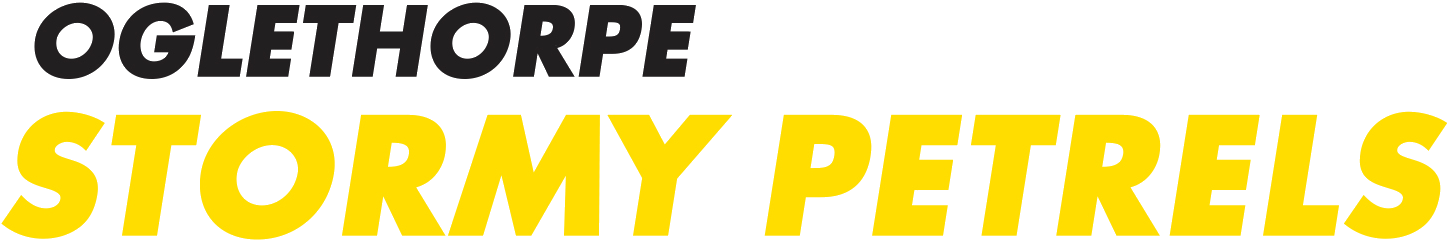
Oglethorpe athletics wordmark

Oglethorpe University teams compete as a member of the Southern Athletic Association (SAA) at the NCAA Division III level and are known as the Stormy Petrels. The Stormy Petrels were a member of the Southern Collegiate Athletic Conference (SCAC) until 2012. Men's sports include baseball, basketball, cross country, golf, lacrosse, soccer, tennis and track & field; women's sports include basketball, cross country, golf, lacrosse, soccer, tennis, track & field, and volleyball.

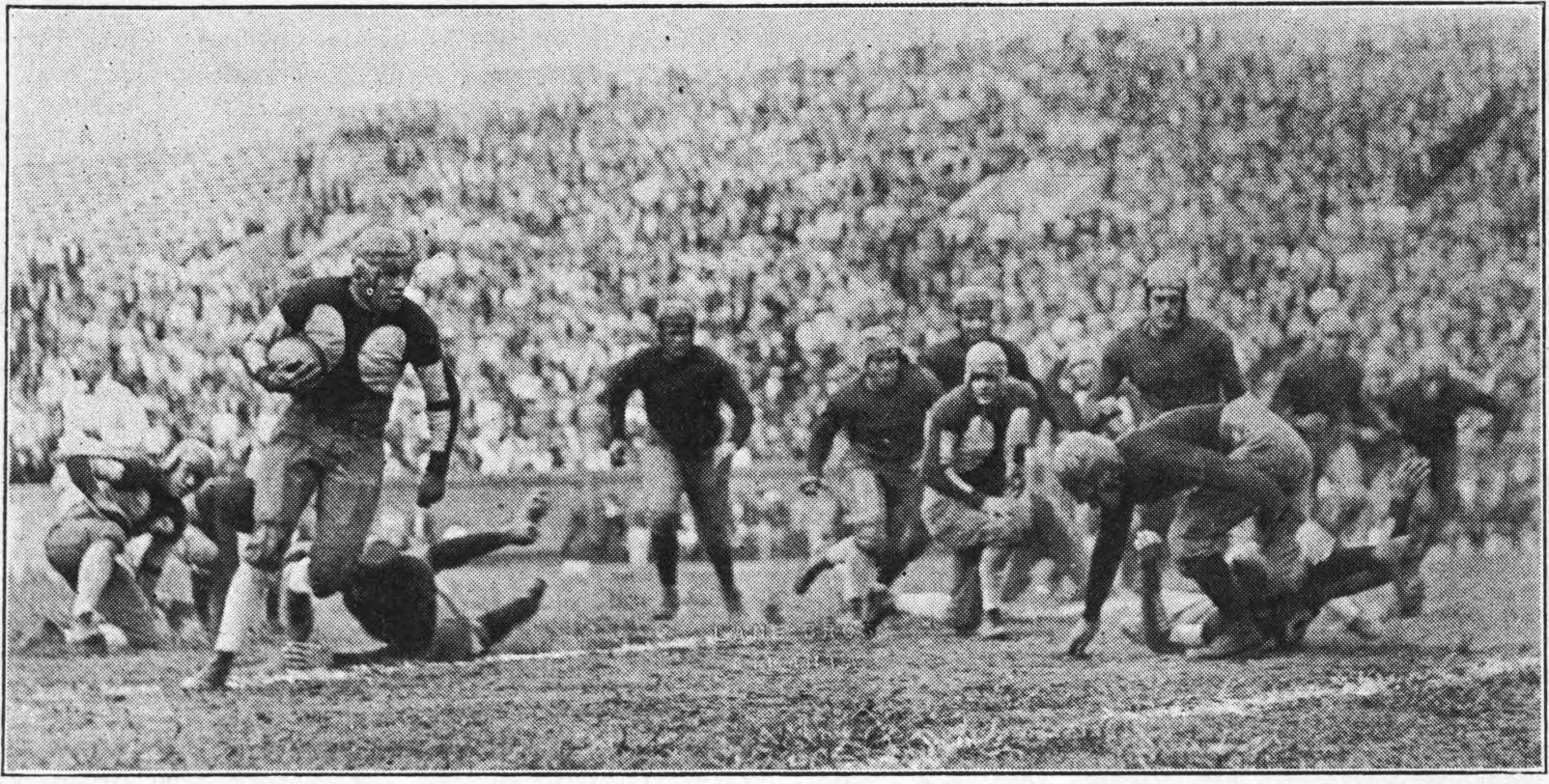
The 1925 football team competing against the 1925 Georgia Tech Golden Tornado at Grant Field

In 2011, the men's soccer program won its first conference championship in school history with a 1–0 victory over Centre College. This win sent them to the NCAA Division III Men's Soccer Championship, also a first in school history for the program. Later on in the spring of 2013, Mark Lavery, an alumnus and All-American member of the 2011 team signed with the Atlanta Silverbacks, a professional soccer team in the North American Soccer League (NASL). Lavery became the first Oglethorpe graduate to play soccer professionally.

In the fall of 2013, the men's soccer team won its second conference championship in school history with a 3–1 victory over Millsaps College. They compiled an 11–3–3 record over the season. The team did not receive a bid into the NCAA national tournament because the Southern Athletic Association was in its second phase of a new-conference transition stage. The men's soccer team won the SAA championship for the second time in 2017 and advanced to the second round of the NCAA tournament, losing to host Washington and Lee University in a penalty shootout after beating North Carolina Wesleyan College in the first round. They finished first in SAA regular season play each season from 2015 to 2018.

More recently, the program saw a resurgence with back-to-back trips to the national tournament in 2018 and 2019, and an SAA championship in 2018. The team advanced to the second round of the NCAA tournament in 2019, beating The University of Chicago in the opening round before falling to host Transylvania University in the second round.

=== Mascot ===
Thornwell Jacobs chose an unusual mascot to represent Oglethorpe's athletic teams: the Stormy Petrel. According to popular legend, James Oglethorpe had observed the Wilson's storm petrel during his voyage to the New World and admired the diminutive seabird for its hardiness and courage during stormy weather. In March 2002, ESPN's David Lloyd named the Stormy Petrel as one of the most memorable college mascot names of all time, second only to the Banana Slugs of UC Santa Cruz.

== Student media ==
- The Carillon, alumni magazine
- The Stormy Petrel, student newspaper
- The Tower, a biannual literary magazine
- The Nightcap, evening degree student newsletter

== Notable alumni ==
- Luke Appling, class of 1932; member of the Major League Baseball Hall of Fame
- Margaret Elizabeth Ashley-Towle, class of 1923; archaeologist
- Bella Bautista, beauty pageant titleholder and transgender rights activist
- Earl Blackwell, class of 1929; celebrity promoter and author
- John G. Blowers, Jr., musician
- Joseph Mackey Brown, class of 1872; governor of Georgia
- Kardea Brown, class of 2011; chef and television host
- John Burke, class of 2011; Grammy-nominated pianist and composer
- Tom Douglas, class of 1975; Grammy-nominated songwriter
- Drew Findling, class of 1981; criminal defense lawyer
- Emily S. Gurley, class of 1996; epidemiologist
- William C. Kavanaugh, class of 1940; former member of the Wisconsin State Assembly
- Dar'shun Kendrick, class of 2004; politician and lawyer
- Sidney Lanier, class of 1860; poet
- Daniel P. Martin, class of 1991; United States Navy rear admiral and commander
- Christopher J. McFadden, class of 1980: judge on the Georgia Court of Appeals
- Benjamin M. Palmer, class of 1852; first national moderator of Presbyterian Church, based in New Orleans
- Ruwa Romman, class of 2015; first Muslim woman elected to the Georgia House of Representatives
- Donald Rubin, class of 1956; art collector and founder of the Rubin Museum of Art
- William J. Sasnett, class of 1839; Methodist pastor and president of Emory University and Auburn University
- Vincent Sherman, class of 1925; film director
- Merriman Smith, class of 1936; journalist
- Sable Elyse Smith, class of 2011; artist and professor at Columbia University
- Charles Allen Stillman, class of 1841; educator and founder of Stillman College
- Charles Weltner, class of 1948; politician
- Robert E. Wolfe, class of 1980; chief operating officer of the Los Angeles Dodgers

== University presidents ==
- Kathryn McClymond, 2023-present
- Nicholas Ladany, 2020-2023
- Lawrence M. Schall, 2005- 2020
- Larry Denton Large, 1999-2005
- Donald Sheldon Stanton, 1988-1999
- Manning Mason Pattillo Jr., 1975-1988
- Paul Kenneth Vonk, 1967-1975
- Paul Rensselaer Beall, 1965-1967
- George Seward, 1964-1965 (Acting)
- Donald Charles Agnew, 1958-1964
- Donald Randolph Wilson, 1956-1957
- James Whitney Bunting, 1953-1955
- Philip Weltner, 1944-1953
- Thornwell Jacobs, 1915-1943
- David Wills, 1870-1872
- William M. Cunningham, 1869-1870
- Samuel Kennedy Talmage, 1841-1865
- Carlyle Pollock Beman, 1836-1840

== See also ==
- Crypt of Civilization
