= Langston University =

Historically Black college in Langston, Oklahoma, U.S.

Coordinates: 35°56′41″N 97°15′41″W

- Former names: Oklahoma Colored Agricultural and Normal University (1897–1941)
- Motto: Education For Service
- Type: Public land-grant historically black university
- Established: March 12, 1897
- Parent institution: Oklahoma Agricultural & Mechanical Colleges
- Academic affiliations: Space-grant
- Endowment: $49 million (2019)
- President: Ruth Ray Jackson
- Students: 1,873
- Location: Langston, Oklahoma, U.S.
- Campus: Rural
- Colors: Blue and orange
- Nickname: Lions
- Sporting affiliations: NAIA – Sooner
- Website: langston.edu

Langston University (LU) is a public, land-grant, historically black university (HBCU) in Langston, Oklahoma, United States. It is the only historically black college in the state and the westernmost four-year public HBCU in the United States. The main campus in Langston is a rural setting 10 miles (16 km) east of Guthrie. The university also serves an urban mission with centers in Tulsa (at the same campus as the OSU-Tulsa facility) and Oklahoma City. The university is a member school of the Thurgood Marshall College Fund. In March 2025, Langston University was named a Carnegie Research College and University.

== History ==
The school was founded in 1897 and was known as the Oklahoma Colored Agricultural and Normal University. From 1898 to 1916, its president was Inman E. Page. LU was created as a result of the second Morrill Act in 1890. The law required states with land-grant colleges (such as Oklahoma State University, then known as Oklahoma A&M) to either admit African Americans or provide an alternative school for them to attend as a condition of receiving federal funds. The university was renamed as Langston University in 1941 in honor of John Mercer Langston (1829–1897), civil rights pioneer, first African-American member of Congress from Virginia, founder of the Howard University Law School, and American consul-general to Haiti.

Poet Melvin B. Tolson taught at Langston from 1947 until 1964. Tolson was portrayed by Denzel Washington in the film The Great Debaters.

The United States Department of Justice filed a lawsuit against Langston University in February 2006 on behalf of Barbara Craig, a white professor who had been teaching at the institution for seven years, alleging that she had experienced racial discrimination by receiving lower wages and fewer opportunities than her similarly qualified, African American colleagues. Debra Jenkins, a white payroll clerk, also brought a lawsuit against the university for passing over her for promotion opportunities, arguing that preferential treatment was provided to African American employees at the expense of others. In both instances, the employees were provided with financial restitution. The former also resulted in the modification of hiring and promotion criteria.

In August 2021, former university President Kent J. Smith Jr announced the university would use COVID-19 relief money to forgive the debt of students enrolled between spring 2020 and summer 2021, forgiving $4.65 million in student debt.

Langston University commemorated the opening of a new allied health facility on its Tulsa campus on March 30, 2023. The facility was dedicated as the Jack Henderson Allied Health Facility on August 2, 2024. The 17,000-square-foot building is home of the Langston University School of Nursing and Health Professions.

President Kent J. Smith Jr announced his retirement as the university's 16th president effective at the end of the Spring 2023 semester. The Oklahoma Agricultural and Mechanical Colleges Board of Regents unanimously appointed Ruth Ray Jackson as interim president beginning July 6, 2023. In April 2024, she was appointed the institution's 17th president with the investiture on March 14, 2025.

=== Law school ===
A law school was established at LU in 1948 after Langston University graduate Ada Lois Sipuel Fisher was denied access to the University of Oklahoma's law school because she was black. She won the case at the U.S. Supreme Court and Oklahoma responded by establishing the law school at LU. Because it was not equivalent to the existing law school, she sued again and finally won access to the law school at the University of Oklahoma.

== Academics ==
Undergraduate demographics as of Fall 2023
| Race and ethnicity | Total |
|---|---|
| Black | 76% |
| American Indian/Alaska Native | 6% |
| Hispanic | 5% |
| International student | 4% |
| White | 4% |
| Two or more races | 3% |
| Unknown | 1% |
Economic diversity
| Low-income (Note: The percentage of students who received an income-based federal Pell grant intended for low-income students.) | 68% |
| Affluent (Note: The percentage of students who are a part of the American middle class at the bare minimum.) | 32% |

Six schools house the degree programs of Langston University: Sherman Lewis School of Agriculture and Applied Sciences; School of Arts and Sciences; School of Business; School of Education and Behavioral Sciences; School of Nursing and Health Professions; and the School of Physical Therapy. Thirty undergraduate and six graduate degree programs are offered at LU.

According to US News and World Report, LU had an 18% graduation rate within the standard four-year period of study in 2025.

The university offers the Edwin P. McCabe Honors Program for highly motivated undergraduate students with exceptional academic records.

The university was accredited with a doctorate of physical therapy (DPT) program in 2005. It is the university's only doctoral program and one of three DPT programs in the state.

Langston University is accredited by the Higher Learning Commission. LU currently has the lowest total cost per credit hour of any four-year university in Oklahoma. Langston was ranked as the #1 value among all HBCUs by BestValueSchools.

== Athletics ==
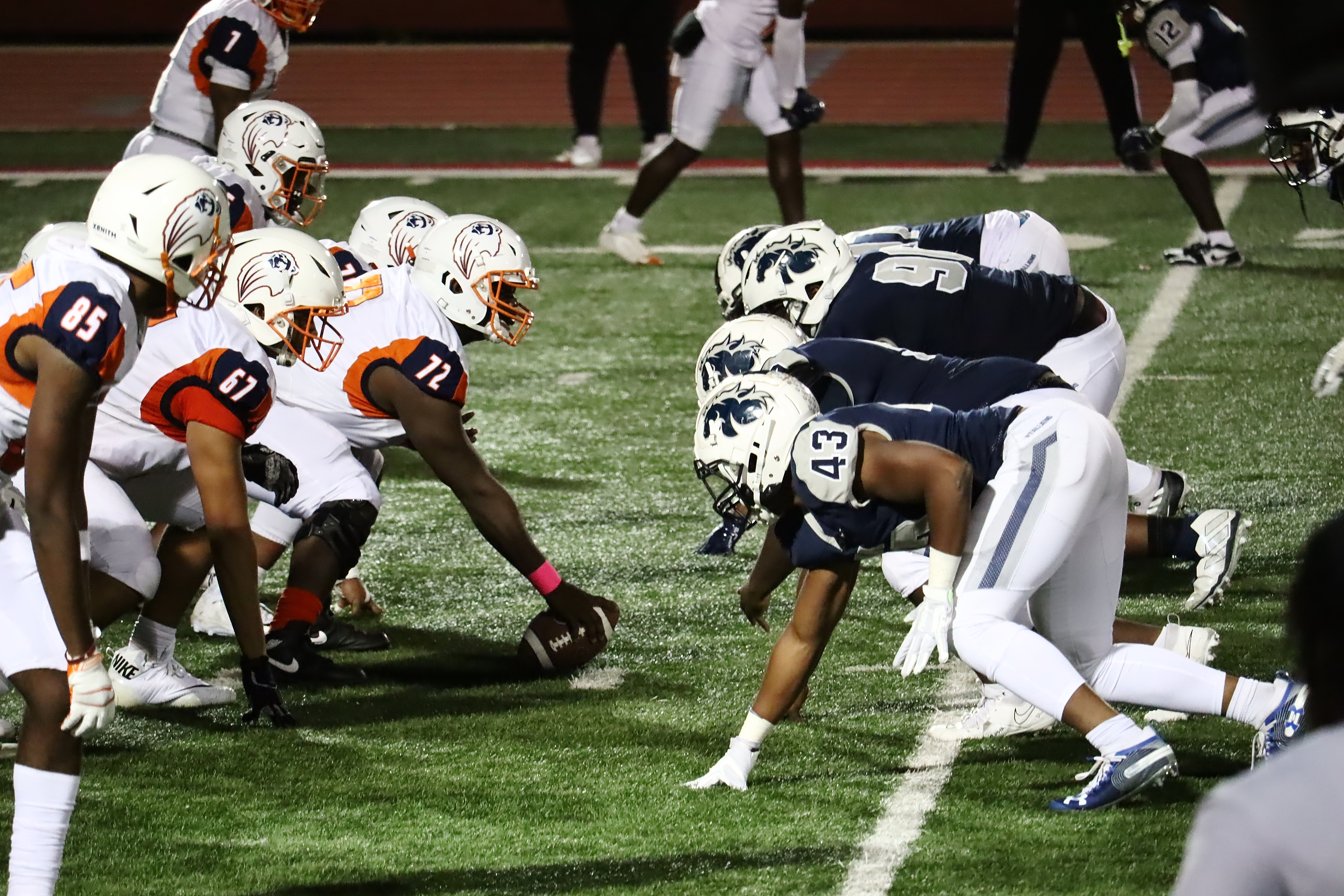
A football game between the Langston Lions (left) and North American Stallions in 2023

The Langston athletic teams are called the Lions. The university is a member of the National Association of Intercollegiate Athletics (NAIA), primarily competing in the Sooner Athletic Conference since the 2018–19 academic year. The Lions previously competed as a member of the Red River Athletic Conference from 1998–99 to 2017–18. They were also a member of the Southwestern Athletic Conference from 1931–32 to 1956–57, which is currently an NCAA Division I FCS athletic conference.

Langston competes in nine intercollegiate varsity sports: Men's sports include basketball, football, and track and field, while women's sports include basketball, cheer, softball, track and field, and volleyball.

=== Marching Pride ===
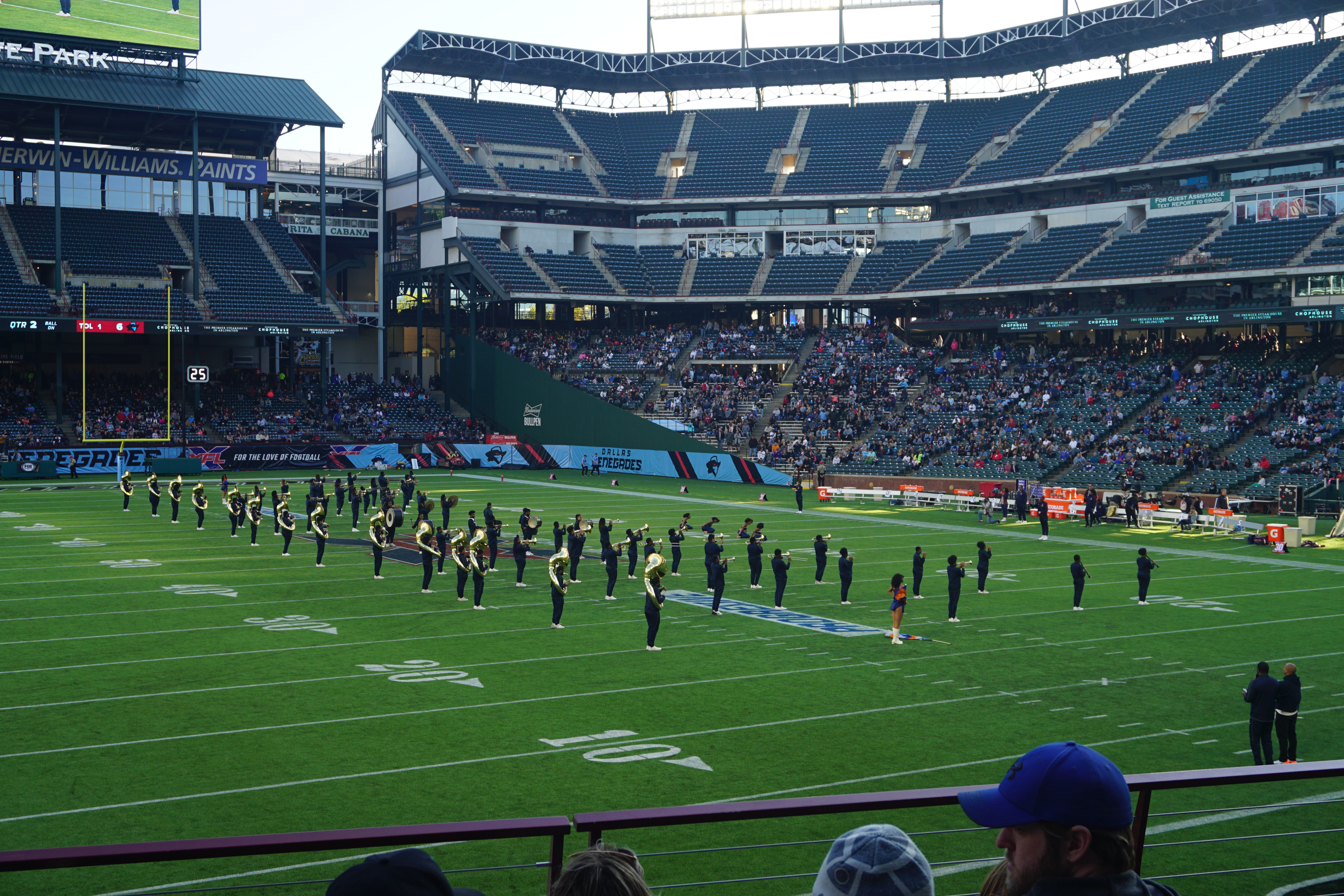
Langston University Marching Pride performing during halftime of a Dallas Renegades game

Langston's marching band is known as the "Langston University Marching Pride". It is a major ambassador of the university, a supporter at athletic events, and serves as a training center for students interested in pursuing a career in music and/or developing pertinent life skills. Charlie Wilson, of the Gap Band, once served as drum major. The Marching Pride has performed for the Denver Nuggets, Oklahoma City Thunder, and Kansas City Chiefs, and has marched in front of huge crowds at the Georgia Dome, AT&T Stadium, and the former Edward Jones Dome in St. Louis, and has participated in four Honda Battle of the Bands events, often marching in front of crowds of over 40,000. Members of the Marching Pride often receive an out-of-state fee waiver along with additional scholarships based upon their audition.

== Notable alumni and attendees ==
| Name | Class year | Notability | Reference(s) |
|---|---|---|---|
| Maurice "Mo" Bassett | | Former fullback for the Cleveland Browns | |
| Bessie Coleman | | First American woman to obtain an International Pilot's license. Coleman enrolled 1910, but completed only one term. | |
| Brendan Crawford | 2013 | Football quarterback | |
| The Delta Rhythm Boys | | Jazz vocal group inducted into the Vocal Group Hall of Fame | |
| Robert DoQui | | Actor | |
| Ada Lois Sipuel Fisher | 1945 | Civil rights activist | |
| Larzette Hale | 1940 | First Black woman CPA to earn a Ph.D in Accounting; Department Head at Utah State University School of Accounting | |
| Nathan Hare | 1954 | Founding publisher of The Black Scholar (1969-1975) and author | |
| Matthew Hatchette | 1997 | football player | |
| Marques Haynes | | basketball player | |
| Thomas "Hollywood" Henderson | 1975 | football player | |
| Jennifer Hudson | 2003 | singer, actress (did not graduate) | |
| Dr. Austin Lane | | former president of Texas Southern University | |
| Odell Lawson | | football player | |
| Clara Luper | 1944 | Civil rights leader | |
| Helen Neal | 1962 | first black graduate of West Texas State University | |
| Dr. Henry Ponder | | former president of several universities | |
| Nancy Riley | | former member of the Oklahoma Senate | |
| Colonel Michael C. Thompson | | 21st Adjutant General of Oklahoma | |

== See also ==
- KALU, Langston U. Public Radio Station 89.3 FM
