= California State University, East Bay =

Public university in Hayward, California

- Former names: State College for Alameda County (1957–1961); Alameda County State College (1961–1963); California State College at Hayward (1963–1972); California State University, Hayward (1972–2005)
- Motto: Per Aspera Ad Astra (Latin)
- Motto in English: "Through Adversity to the Stars"
- Type: Public university
- Established: 1957; 69 years ago
- Parent institution: California State University
- Accreditation: WSCUC
- Academic affiliations: USU
- Endowment: $21.95 million (2023-24)
- Budget: $245.2 million (2024-25)
- President: Cathy Sandeen
- Provost: Anthony Muscat
- Academic staff: 760 (Fall 2024)
- Administrative staff: 772 (Fall 2024)
- Students: 12,323 (Fall 2024)
- Undergraduates: 9,784 (Fall 2024)
- Postgraduates: 2,539 (Fall 2024)
- Location: Hayward, California, United States; 37.6575°N 122.0568°W
- Campus: Hayward: 200 acres (81 ha) Concord: 384 acres (155 ha) Oakland: 15,000 sq ft (1,400 m^{2}); Large suburb
- Other campuses: Concord; Oakland
- Newspaper: The Pioneer
- Colors: Red, black, and white
- Nickname: Pioneers
- Sporting affiliations: NCAA Division II – CCAA; WWPA
- Website: www.csueastbay.edu

CSUEB student housing district, facing east, showing both old and new facilities

California State University, East Bay (Cal State East Bay, CSU East Bay, or CSUEB) is a public university in Hayward, California, United States. The university is part of the California State University system and offers 136 undergraduate and 60 post-baccalaureate areas of study. Founded in 1957, California State University, East Bay had a student body of approximately 11,544 as of Spring 2025. As of Fall 2024, it had 760 faculty. The university's largest and oldest college campus is located in Hayward, with additional centers in the nearby cities of Oakland and Concord.

== History ==
The university was established as State College for Alameda County (Alameda State College), with its primary mission to serve the higher education needs of both Alameda County and Contra Costa County. Its construction was part of the California Master Plan for Higher Education as proposed by Clark Kerr and the original site for the school was Pleasanton, California. The campus was moved to Hayward before plans were finalized due to the efforts of State Assembly member Carlos Bee and other boosters from the Hayward community, including S.E. Bond Jr, and E. Guy Warren, namesake of Warren Hall. At the time of its opening in 1959, classes were first held on the campus of Sunset High School and then Hayward High School. With the addition of the school, higher education in the San Francisco Bay Area became more accessible. To the south was San Jose State College (now San Jose State University) serving the South Bay counties. To the west was San Francisco State College (now San Francisco State University) serving San Francisco and San Mateo Counties. To the north is Sonoma State University, serving Marin, Napa and Sonoma counties. Chabot College, a part of the California Community College system, opened nearby in Hayward in 1961.

The university has undergone numerous transitions in its history, making name changes accordingly. In 1961, the school was moved to its present location in the Hayward Hills and renamed Alameda County State College. In 1963, the name was changed to California State College at Hayward. The school was granted university status in 1972, changing its name to California State University, Hayward. In 2005, the university implemented a new, broader mission to serve the eastern San Francisco Bay Area and adopted the name California State University, East Bay. The proposal to rename the campus to California State University, East Bay was approved by the California State University Board of Trustees on January 26, 2005.

=== Presidents ===
Cathy Sandeen, an Oakland native and alumnus of two other California State University institutions: Humboldt State University (B.S. in Speech Pathology summa cum laude) and San Francisco State University (M.A. in Broadcast & Electronic Communication Arts), became the sixth president of CSU East Bay on January 4, 2021, following the announcement of her appointment to the position by the Board of Trustees on October, 29, 2020. She previously served as chancellor of the University of Alaska Anchorage (UAA). Prior to her time at UAA, Sandeen served as chancellor of the University of Wisconsin Colleges and University of Wisconsin-Extension from 2014 to 2018. In that role, she served as leader and chief administrator and was responsible for the academic, financial and administrative activities of two statewide higher education institutions.

== Campus ==
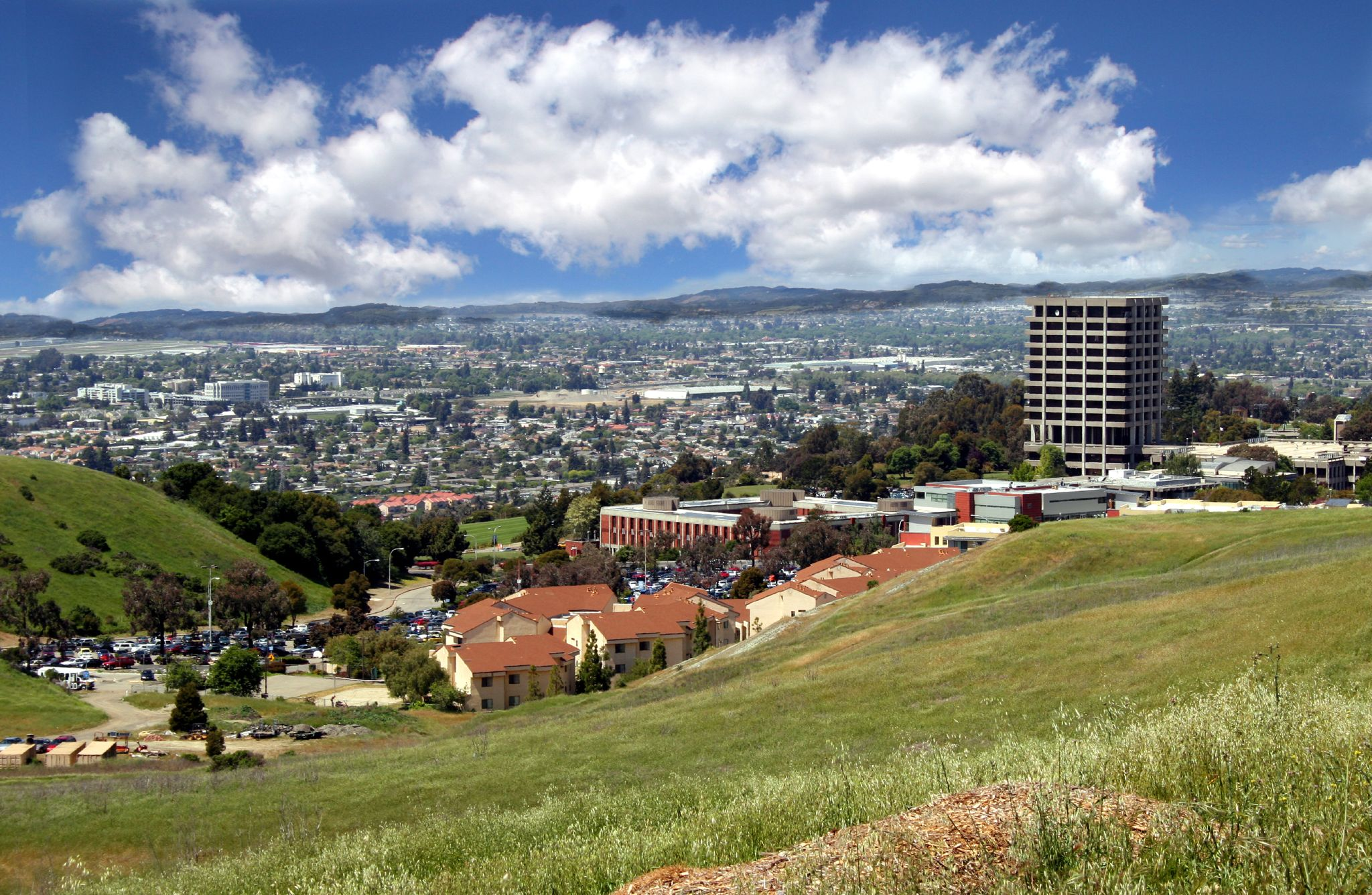
Hayward, East Bay hills, and the San Francisco Bay, overlooking California State University, East Bay and the iconic (now demolished) Warren Hall

The school's main campus is located in Hayward, California on a plateau east of the Hayward fault that overlooks the southeast part of the city. CSUEB also has a branch in Concord, California in Contra Costa County, and a professional development center in Oakland.

For 40 years, Warren Hall was CSUEB's signature building; the building was visible from cities throughout the San Francisco Bay Area and served as a landmark for Hayward and the surrounding Eastern San Francisco Bay Area. Warren Hall was rated the least earthquake-safe building in the California State University system by the CSU Seismic Review Board. In January 2013 the CSU Board of Trustees authorized $50 million to demolish the former administrative building and replace it with a new structure. Warren Hall was demolished by implosion on August 17, 2013. Construction for the new 67,000 square foot-building began in November 2013, and doors opened in December 2015 on the completed structure.

California State University, East Bay is also known for its Solar Energy Project. Solar panels were installed on four campus rooftops and are used to generate supplemental power during peak periods and is one of the largest photovoltaic systems in Northern California.

On April 8, 2010, the California Public Utilities Commission approved a fuel cell project of Pacific Gas and Electric Company (PG&E) allowing Cal State East Bay's Hayward campus to become one of the first college campuses in Northern California to have a fuel cell. Once installed, the waste heat generated by the fuel cell will be converted into hot water to be used in campus buildings.

Since 2004, the Pioneer Amphitheatre on campus has been home of the KBLX Stone Soul Picnic, a day-long festival of R&B, soul and Urban Adult Contemporary music. Featured performers have included Ronald Isley, The Whispers, Teena Marie, Rick James, and The O'Jays. California State University, East Bay's Associated Student Incorporated also hosts concerts with artists like Lupe Fiasco and Goapele.

In 2005, Cal State East Bay began to build three new facilities: the Wayne and Gladys Valley Business and Technology Center (VBT), the Pioneer Heights student housing expansion and the University Union annex. The 67,000-square-foot (6,200 m^{2}) VBT center was dedicated in February 2007, making it the first new academic building on the Hayward Campus in more than 30 years. The building houses programs in business, technology management, engineering, multimedia, science, and online degree programs. An expansion to Pioneer Heights was dedicated in fall 2008. Student housing was able to accommodate more than 450 new residents and offer a 16,000-square-foot (1,500 m^{2}) dining commons. An annex to the existing University Union opened in January 2007.

The campus is home to the C. E. Smith Museum of Anthropology, created in 1975. The museum, open to the public, has rotating exhibits, and archives including records of 18 Bay Area archaeological sites.

== Academics ==
Undergraduate admission statistics
	Fall 2025	Fall 2024	Fall 2023	Fall 2022	Fall 2021
First-time Freshmen
Applicants	13,076	13,244	14,609	14,882	14,448
Admits	11,535	11,557	12,851	11,988	11,899
Admit rate	88%	87%	88%	81%	82%
Enrolled	713	792	994	896	941
Yield rate	6%	7%	8%	7%	8%
Transfers
Applicants	8,684	8,545	8,496	9,215	9,601
Admits	7,034	6,905	6,879	7,680	7,784
Admit rate	81%	81%	81%	83%	81%
Enrolled	2,067	2,015	2,038	1,842	2,076
Yield rate	29%	29%	30%	24%	27%

The university is best known for its College of Business and Economics; an Education Department, where a large percentage of California teachers receive their certification; and the Music Department where the California State University, East Bay Jazz Ensemble, directed by Dave Eshelman (retired June 2007), holds annual performances in Yoshi's at Jack London Square in Oakland, and frequently tours Europe and parts of South America. The Biotechnology Program developed at California State University, East Bay affords the university a status as the center of research and development in the Life sciences, Bioinformatics and technologies for the Eastern San Francisco Bay Area.

California State University, East Bay also participates in the Internet2 project, a collaboration led by over 200 U.S. universities, private industries, and governments to develop advanced network technologies for research and higher education in the 21st century.

California State University, East Bay offers 48 undergraduate degree programs and 34 Master's degree programs in addition to its teaching credential program. The university also has a doctoral program in Educational Leadership (Ed.D.) held in cooperation with the University of California, Berkeley, San Francisco State University and San José State University. The most popular undergraduate majors are: Business administration, Psychology, Health science, Kinesiology, Criminal justice, Biological sciences, Sociology, Computer science, Human development, Fine art.

The five most popular majors for 2019 graduates.

- Business Administration and Management, General at 21%
- Health Professions and Related Programs at 16%
- Social Sciences at 10%
- Psychology, General at 10%
- Family and Consumer Economics and Related Services, Other at 6%

The academic departments of the university are organized into four colleges. Two of these are Liberal Arts colleges,

- College of Letters, Arts, and Social Sciences (CLASS)
- College of Science

and two of these are vocational colleges:

- College of Business and Economics
- College of Education and Allied Studies (CEAS)

First year students are put into Freshman Learning Communities which help students to:

- earn higher GPAs
- develop superior writing and communication skills
- graduate reliably in four years.

=== Rankings ===
Academic rankings

Regional
- U.S. News & World Report: 257 in (National Universities)

National
- Forbes: 477
- Washington Monthly: 145
- WSJ/College Pulse: 401-500

2025-2026 USNWR Best Regional Colleges West Rankings
Top Performers on Social Mobility	65 (tie)
Top Public Schools	145 (tied)
Best Undergraduate Engineering Programs	197 tied (At schools where doctorate not offered)
Nursing	249 (tie)
Economics	293-318 in (2023-2024)

2024-2025 USNWR Graduate School Rankings
Program	Ranking
Speech–Language Pathology	140 (tie)
Social Work	142 (tie)
Public Affairs Programs	217 (tie)

== Student life ==
Undergraduate demographics as of Fall 2023
Race and ethnicity	Total
Hispanic	41%
Asian	22%
White	15%
Black	9%
Two or more races	5%
Unknown	4%
Foreign national	2%
Native Hawaiian/Pacific Islander	1%
Economic diversity
Low-income (Note: The percentage of students who received an income-based federal Pell grant intended for low-income students.)	44%
Affluent (Note: The percentage of students who are a part of the American middle class at the bare minimum.)	56%

The university's Department of Communications publishes a weekly newspaper called The Pioneer, its name referring to the school mascot, Pioneer Pete. The paper is staffed by faculty and students. East Bay is a diverse state university as indicated by the annual headcount report. As of fall 2018 CSU East Bay has the largest enrollment percentage of Filipino Americans, the second largest enrollment percentage of Pacific Islanders, African Americans and non-residents in the Cal State system.

=== Associated Students Incorporated ===
Associated Students Incorporated (ASI) is a student-run and student-owned organization that represents the student body at California State University, East Bay. Elected by the California State University, East Bay student body, the 15-member ASI Board of Directors is the governing body of Associated Students, Inc. The Board makes policy and oversees the fiscal responsibility of ASI. Additionally, the Board assists the university in planning, implementing, and evaluating campus programs, events, and curriculum. ASI currently has four departments: ASI Presents, ASI Business Office, Student Government, and the Early Childhood Education Center. In 2007 the university administration did not allow ASI to hold a student referendum on increasing student fees to fund a recreation and wellness center. It substituted 'alternative consultation'. In 2008, the administration again did not allow ASI to hold a referendum on increasing student fees to fund athletic scholarship for a move to Division II sports. Again, it substituted 'alternative consultation'.

=== Greek letter organizations ===
There are several fraternities and sororities on campus.

== Athletics ==
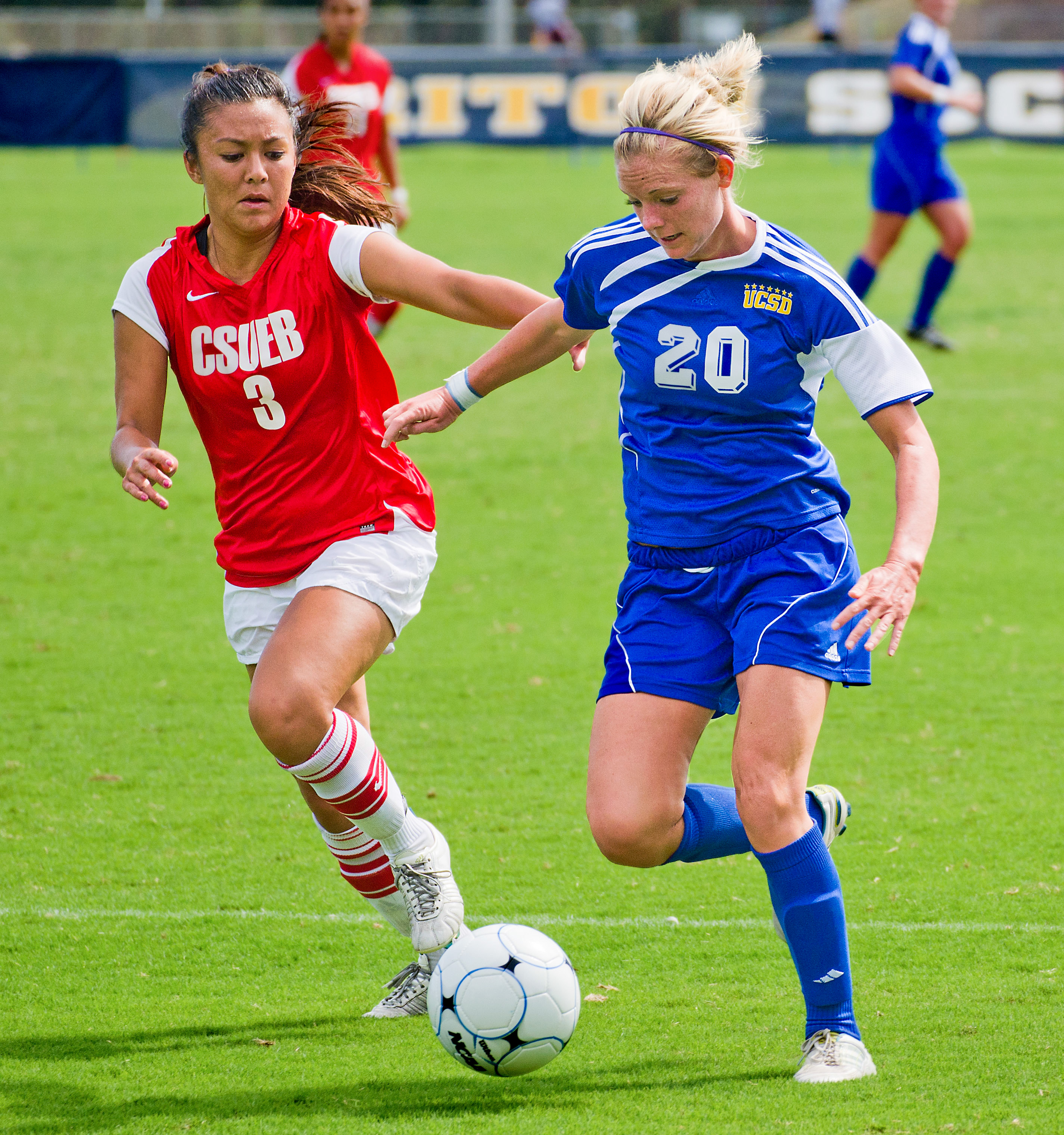
A CSUEB soccer player attempting to take the ball from a University of California, San Diego (UCSD) attacker

The Cal State–East Bay (CSUEB) athletic teams are called the Pioneers. The university is a member of the Division II level of the National Collegiate Athletic Association (NCAA), primarily competing in the California Collegiate Athletic Association (CCAA) for most of their sports since the 2009–10 academic year; while its women's water polo teams compete in the Western Water Polo Association (WWPA). The Pioneers previously competed in the California Pacific Conference (Cal Pac) of the National Association of Intercollegiate Athletics (NAIA) from 1998–99 to 2008–09.

CSUEB competes in 15 intercollegiate varsity sports: Men's sports include baseball, basketball, cross country, golf, soccer and track & field (indoor and outdoor); while women's sports include basketball, cross country, golf, soccer, softball, swimming, track & field (indoor and outdoor), volleyball and water polo.

=== Mascot ===
The mascot of the university is the Pioneer. At the inception of the athletic program in 1961 the student body chose an astronaut as the mascot.

=== Water polo ===
The NCAA Women's Water Polo Championship of Effective Division I sports is open to members of all three NCAA divisions and Only East Bay and CSU Monterey Bay from the CCAA participate in the Western Water Polo Association.

=== Soccer ===
In 1988 the women's soccer team won the NCAA Division II Women's Soccer Championship. The Pioneers of CSU East Bay has earned 2 NCAA team championships at the Division II level.
