= Royce Money =

American academic (born 1942)

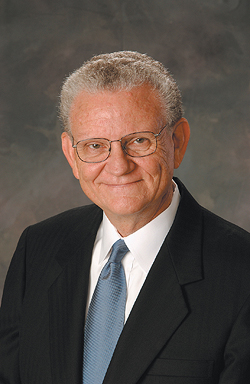
- Money in 2010

Chancellor of Abilene Christian University
- Incumbent
- Assumed office 2010

President of Abilene Christian University
- In office 1991–2010

Personal details
- Born: July 13, 1942 (age 84) Temple, Texas, U.S.
- Education: Abilene Christian University (BS); University of Nebraska (MS); Baylor University (PhD)

Royce Lynn Money (born July 13, 1942) is an American academic administrator who served as president of Abilene Christian University from 1991 to 2010, whereupon he became Chancellor. He was succeeded as president by Phil Schubert.

== Education ==
After attending Temple High School, Money graduated from Abilene Christian University, where he majored in Biblical Studies. He received a Bachelor of Sacred Theology from that college, a Master of Science in Human Development and the Family from the University of Nebraska, and a Ph.D. in Religion from Baylor University in Waco, Texas.

== Career ==
Money has served continuously in the ministry even since 1981. His earlier ministerial roles having been in Silver Spring, Maryland; Montgomery, Alabama; Springfield, Missouri (where he was also an adjunct professor at Missouri State University); and Dallas, Texas. Money has held leadership positions in the Council for Christian Colleges and Universities, Abilene Chamber of Commerce, Independent Colleges and Universities of Texas, and United Way of Abilene. Money was Abilene's "Outstanding Citizen of the Year" for 2007.

Money has written two books on families.

== Personal life ==
Since 1965, Money has been married to Pamela Joy Handy Money, whom he met when they were students at Abilene Christian University. The couple have two daughters.
