= Ruth Ray Jackson =

American academic administrator

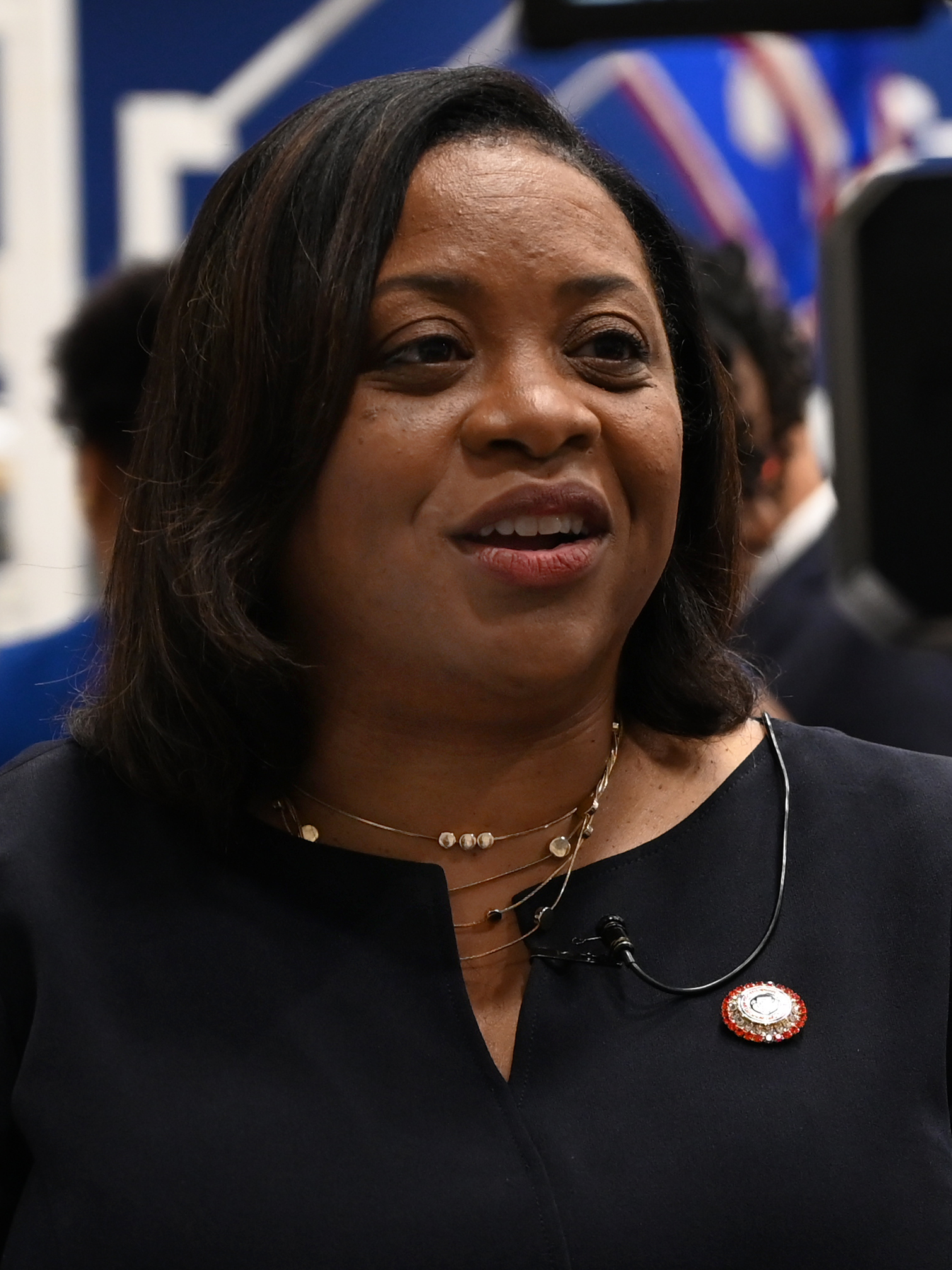

17th President of Langston University
- Incumbent
- Assumed office 2024
- Preceded by: Kent J. Smith, Jr.

Personal details
- Education: Southern University and A&M College; Colorado State University

Ruth Ray Jackson is an American academic administrator serving as the seventeenth president of Langston University since 2024. She was previously its interim president, vice president of academic affairs, and a professor and dean of the school of education and behavioral sciences.

== Life ==
Jackson earned a bachelor's degree in secondary education and English and a master's degree in educational leadership and administration from Southern University and A&M College. She completed a Ph.D. in education and human resource management at Colorado State University.

Jackson was a public school teacher and administrator in Louisiana. She later worked at Louisiana State University Shreveport for eleven years. She was an associate professor of education, director of the master of education program, and chaired the education department. In 2014, she joined Langston University as a professor and dean of the school of education and behavioral sciences. In 2018, she was promoted to associate vice president for student success. For one year, she served as the vice president of academic affairs before working as the interim president for one year. In 2024, she became its seventeenth president.
