= Multicultural organizational development =

Multicultural organizational Development (MOD) has been posited as a useful model for facilitating comprehensive long-term change for divisions of student affairs committed to transforming themselves into multicultural organizations. Is one that has a workforce that includes people from diverse backgrounds across all departments, and which offers them equal opportunity for input and advancement within the company. A multicultural organization also possesses an absence of discrimination or prejudice toward people based on their race, religion, ethnicity, gender, age, sexual orientation, or physical limitation.

== Acculturation ==
Acculturation are modes by which two groups adapt to each other and resolve cultural differences. Acculturation include the cultural change while obtaining two cultures and to society. In working in a new environment you will begin to adapt form and change habit due to acculturation.

== Structural Integration ==
Cultural profiles of organization members including hiring, job placement, and job status profiles. Structural Integration has a workforce profile data has typically been monitored under traditional equal opportunity and affirmative action guidelines. Structural organization needs to be viewed widely across other ethnicity and work group to comprehend the organization.

== Informal Integration ==
Inclusion of minority culture members in informal networks and activities outside of normal working hours. Informal integration also addresses mentoring and other informal developmental relationships in organizations. Informal organization complements the more explicit structures, plans, and processes of the formal organization.

== Cultural bias ==
Cultural bias has prejudice and discrimination. Cultural bias is when you judge someone else's culture based on your own. For example, this is seen in Italy where they often take three-hour naps in the middle of the day. It would be an outrage if some businesses tried to start that in the United States. This relates to multiculturalism because bias is often one sided and Multiculturalism embraces cultures from across the globe.

== Organizational identification ==
Feelings of belonging, loyalty, and commitment to the organization. Organizational identification is how much a person defines themselves as part of an organization they are a part of. It also refers to prosperity of the individual at the company. It relates to multiculturalism since at any organization there are bound to be a lot of people with a lot of different backgrounds. Some might not consider their place in the organization as a top priority while others might. In the end it comes back to how they were raised and where work lies in the pecking order.

== Intergroup conflict ==
Intergroup conflict is when there is a confrontation between two or more groups and their members, either between departments, companies, political parties or nations. This conflict can be psychological tension or physical violence. Conflict relates to multiculturalism because often different cultures are the ones that end up clashing. A prime example would be the United States and Soviet Union during the Cold War. They feel that capitalism and communism could not co-exist so then one must be eradicated.
