= List of longest-serving higher education presidents in the United States =

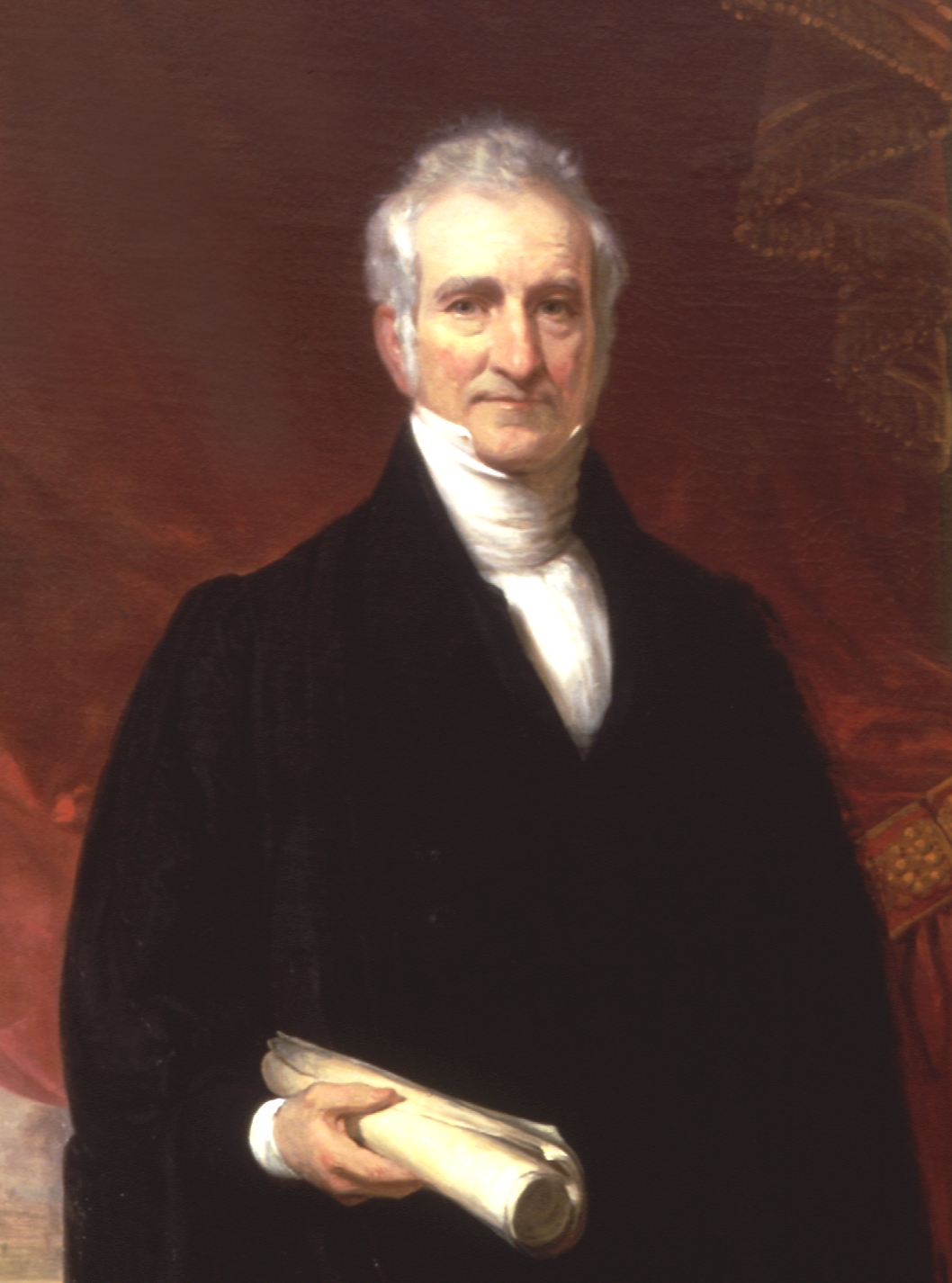
Eliphalet Nott, longest serving college president in US history

The longest serving president of a United States institution of higher education is Eliphalet Nott, who served at Union College in Schenectady, New York, for 62 years, from 1804 to 1866.

== List ==
According to a 2007 report from the American Council on Education, only about 5% of all in-office college presidents had served longer than 20 years. The list below consists of individuals who have served for 30 years or longer.

Name	Term	Start date	End date	College	Location	Notes (Note: For the purposes of the list, "Chancellor" and "President" are interchangeable titles.)
Eliphalet Nott	62 years	1804	1866	Union College	Schenectady, NY	Longest serving college president in U.S. history.
Paul F. Beacham	59 years	1919	1978	Holmes Bible College	Greenville, SC	Longest serving seminary president in U.S. history.
Bernard Pennings	57 years	1898	1955	St. Norbert College	De Pere, WI	
B. B. Dougherty	56 years	1899	1955	Appalachian State University	Boone, NC	Founder, longest serving president in North Carolina.
Richard I. Gouse	55 years	1971	present	New England Institute of Technology	East Greenwich, RI	Only 24 at the time of assuming his position.
Victor G. Alicea	52 years	1974	present	Boricua College	New York, NY	Founder
Edward W. France	52 years	1888	1940	Philadelphia University	Philadelphia, PA	
Frederic W. Boatwright	51 years	1895	1946	University of Richmond	Richmond, VA	
Leon Botstein	51 years	1975	2026	Bard College	Annandale-on-Hudson, NY	
James Blair	50 years	1693	1743	College of William and Mary	Williamsburg, VA	
Lionel R. Bordeaux	50 years	1972	2022	Sinte Gleska University	Mission, SD	Provided leadership for the first fully accredited reservation-based institution of higher education at the bachelor's degree level. Black Hills State University named a residence hall in his honor. Died in 2022.
Francis H. Smith	50 years	1839	1889	Virginia Military Institute	Lexington, VA	Longest serving military superintendent in U.S. history
Jack Evans, Sr.	49 years	1967	2016	Southwestern Christian College	Terrell, TX	
Norman Francis	47 years	1968	2015	Xavier University of Louisiana	New Orleans, LA	
Albert Gardner Boyden	46 years	1860	1906	Bridgewater Normal School	Bridgewater, MA	Succeeded by his son, Arthur Clarke Boyden, who served from 1906 to 1933. Father and son totaled 73 years of leadership.
Chatt G. Wright	45 years	1976	2011	Hawaii Pacific University	Honolulu, Hi	
William R. Harvey	44 years	1978	2022	Hampton University	Hampton, VA	
Joseph L. Jarman	44 years	1902	1946	Longwood University	Farmville, VA	
Frederic B. Pratt	44 years	1893	1937	Pratt Institute	Brooklyn, NY	
Charles A. Blanchard	43 years	1882	1925	Wheaton College	Wheaton, IL	
Daniel L. Anderson	43 years	1983	present	Appalachian Bible College	Mount Hope, WV	
Nicholas Murray Butler	43 years	1902	1945	Columbia University	New York, NY	
Clarence W. Daugette	43 years	1899	1942	Jacksonville State University	Jacksonville, AL	Alabama's longest serving university president.
Joseph N. Hankin	43 years	1971	2014	Westchester Community College	Valhalla, NY	Longest serving community college president in the US.
William Fletcher King	43 years	1863	1908	Cornell College	Mount Vernon, IA	1863-1865 served as Acting President
Luns C. Richardson	43 years	1974	2017	Morris College	Sumter, SC	
Frances Shimer	43 years	1853	1896	Shimer College	Chicago, IL	
Joseph N. Hankin	42 years	1971	2013	Westchester Community College	Valhalla, New York	Longest serving community college president
V. Clyde Muse	42 years	1978	2020	Hinds Community College	Raymond, MS	
Pat Robertson	42 years	1978	2023	Regent University	Virginia Beach, VA	
Frank Palmer Speare	42 years	1898	1940	Northeastern University	Boston, MA	Founder
Janet Eisner	41 years	1979	2022	Emmanuel College	Boston, MA	
Ralph Waldo Emerson Jones	41 years	1936	1977	Grambling State University	Grambling, LA	
William Foster Peirce	41 years	1896	1937	Kenyon College	Gambier, OH	
W. Burkette Raper	41 years	1954	1995	University of Mount Olive	Mount Olive, NC	
Faith A. Takes	41 years	1985	present	Mildred Elley	Albany, NY	
W. Sam Monroe	40 years	1974	2014	Lamar State College-Port Arthur	Port Arthur, TX	
Stephen B. L. Penrose	40 years	1894	1934	Whitman College	Walla Walla, WA	
Henry N. Snyder	40 years	1902	1942	Wofford College	Spartanburg, SC	
Robert H. Spence	40 years	1974	2014	Evangel University	Springfield, MO	
Charles William Eliot	40 years	1869	1909	Harvard University	Cambridge, MA	
Abbot Leo Haid	39 years	1885	1924	Belmont Abbey College	Belmont, NC	The first president of the college.
Dennis J. Murray	39 years	1979 2019	2016 2021	Marist College	Poughkeepsie, NY	President twice
James Burrill Angell	38 years	1871	1909	University of Michigan	Ann Arbor, MI	
David L. Eubanks	38 years	1969	2007	Johnson Bible College	Knoxville, TN	
Russell Conwell	38 years	1887	1925	Temple University	Philadelphia, PA	
John F. MacArthur	38 years	1985	2019	The Master's College	Santa Clarita, CA	Chancellor afterwards.
Philip Pumerantz	38 years	1977	2015	Western University of Health Sciences	Pomona, CA	Longest serving president in the state of California. Founding president.
Jack Hawkins Jr.	37 years	1989	present	Troy University	Troy, AL	Plans to retire in December 2027
Mary Eileen O'Brien	37 years	1979 1997	1987 2024	Dominican University New York	Orangeburg, New York	President twice
William Burns Paterson	37 years	1878	1915	Alabama State University	Montgomery, AL	At the time of his appointment, the school was then named Lincoln Normal School and based in Marion. The school moved to Montgomery in 1887 and changed its name to the Normal School for Colored Students.
Sister Denise Roche	37 years	1979	2016	D'Youville College	Buffalo, NY	
Mary Emma Woolley	37 years	1900	1937	Mount Holyoke College	South Hadley, MA	
William H. Black	36 years	1890	1926	Missouri Valley College	Marshall, MO	
Sharon C. Diaz	36 years	1982	2018	Samuel Merritt University	Oakland, CA	
Jerry Falwell	36 years	1971	2007	Liberty University	Lynchburg, VA	
Cornelius P. Haggard	36 years	1939	1975	Azusa Pacific University	Azusa, CA	
Mark Hopkins	36 years	1836	1872	Williams College	Williamstown, MA	
Robert L. McLendon Jr.	36 years	1972	2008	St. Johns River State College	Palatka, FL	
Franklin Benjamin Moore	36 years	1898	1934	Rider University	Lawrenceville, NJ	
Bevan Morris	36 years	1980	2016	Maharishi University of Management	Fairfield, IA	
George A. Pruitt	36 years	1982	2018	Thomas Edison State University	Trenton, NJ	Longest serving president in the state of New Jersey
Marilyn Schlack	36 years	1982	2018	Kalamazoo Valley Community College	Kalamazoo, MI	
John Wheelock	36 years	1779	1815	Dartmouth College	Hanover, NH	
Theodore Hesburgh	35 years	1952	1987	University of Notre Dame	South Bend, IN	
Franklin Frazee Moore	36 years	1934	1969	Rider University	Lawrenceville, NJ	
Charles P. Adams	35 years	1901	1936	Grambling State University	Grambling, LA	
Willard M. Aldrich	35 years	1943	1978	Multnomah University	Portland, OR	
Martin Brewer Anderson	35 years	1853	1888	University of Rochester	Rochester, NY	
William Lowe Bryan	35 years	1902	1937	Indiana University	Bloomington, IN	
E. George Evans	35 years	1884	1919	Champlain College	Burlington, VT	
Jairy C. Hunter Jr.	35 years	1983	2018	Charleston Southern University	Charleston, SC	
Nathan Lord	35 years	1828	1863	Dartmouth College	Hanover, NH	
Stephen W. Paine	35 Years	1937	1972	Houghton College	Houghton, NY	
Joel Read	35 years	1968	2003	Alverno College	Milwaukee, WI	
Benjamin Rush Rhees	35 years	1900	1935	University of Rochester	Rochester, NY	
Charles Schlimpert	35 years	1983	2018	Concordia University Portland	Portland, OR	Longest serving President in the State of Oregon
James H. Taylor	35 years	1980	2015	University of the Cumberlands	Williamsburg, KY	
A. Gordon Tittemore	35 years	1920	1955	Champlain College	Burlington, VT	
Ray Paul Authement, Sr.	34 years	1974	2008	University of Louisiana at Lafayette	Lafayette, La	
Charles Paul Conn	34 years	1986	2020	Lee University	Cleveland, TN	
Jerry C. Davis	34 years	1988	2022	College of the Ozarks	Point Lookout, MO	Chancellor since 2022
Mordecai Wyatt Johnson	34 years	1926	1960	Howard University	Washington, D.C.	
Bob Jones III	34 years	1971	2005	Bob Jones University	Greenville, SC	Chancellor since 2005.
Edgar Odell Lovett	34 years	1912	1946	Rice Institute	Houston, TX	
J. Donald Monan	34 years	1972	1996	Boston College	Chestnut Hill, MA	Served as President until 1996, then Chancellor.
Joseph W. Polisi	34 years	1984	2018	The Juilliard School	New York City, NY	
James M. Rosser	34 years	1979	2013	California State University, Los Angeles	Los Angeles, CA	
Eugene C. Sanderson	34 years	1895	1929	Northwest Christian University	Eugene, OR	
Kenneth C.M. Sills	34 years	1918	1952	Bowdoin College	Brunswick, ME	
W. Wilbert Welch	34 years	1959	1983	Cornerstone University	Grand Rapids, MI	Chancellor afterwards.
Lester E Pipkin	33 years	1950	1983	Appalachian Bible College	Mount Hope, WV	Served as co-founder and president from 1950-1983 then as Chancellor from 1983-2001.
Mark W. Ellingson	33 years	1936	1969	Rochester Institute of Technology	Henrietta, NY	
William Parker McKee	33 years	1897	1930	Shimer College	Chicago, IL	
Thomas Hanna McMichael	33 years	1903	1936	Monmouth College	Monmouth, IL	
Albert Mohler	33 years	1993	present	Southern Baptist Theological Seminary	Louisville, KY	
Palmer C. Ricketts	33 years	1901	1934	Rensselaer Polytechnic Institute	Troy, NY	
H. Mebane Turner	33 years	1969	2002	University of Baltimore	Baltimore, MD	
C. Hoyt Watson	33 years	1926	1959	Seattle Pacific University	Seattle, WA	
Samuel Belkin	32 years	1943	1975	Yeshiva University	New York, NY	
Ronald L. Ellis	32 years	1994	present	California Baptist University	Riverside, CA	Since becoming president in 1994, enrollment has grown from 808 to 11,931.
Arend D. Lubbers	32 years	1968	2001	Grand Valley State University	Allendale, MI	
Cloyd H. Marvin	32 years	1927	1959	George Washington University	Washington, DC	
Edwin Massey	32 years	1988	2020	Indian River State College	Fort Pierce, FL	
Henry T. Moore	32 years	1925	1957	Skidmore College	Saratoga Springs, NY	
Henry Morton (scientist)	32 years	1870	1902	Stevens Institute of Technology	Hoboken, NJ	First president of Stevens and namesake of the Morton Memorial Laboratory of Chemistry on the NRHP since 2022.
James Kennedy Patterson	32 years	1878	1910	University of Kentucky	Lexington, KY	
Andrew Jackson Rider	32 years	1866	1898	Rider University	Lawrenceville, NJ	First president of the college
Kurt R. Schmeller	32 years	1967	1999	Queensborough Community College	Queens, NY	
Steven Van Ausdle	32 years	1984	2016	Walla Walla Community College	Walla Walla, WA	
Jahnae H. Barnett	31 years	1990	2021	William Woods University	Fulton, MO	
James Carnahan	31 years	1823	1854	Princeton University	Princeton, NJ	
Henry Hardin Cherry	31 years	1906	1937	Western Kentucky University	Bowling Green, KY	
Felton G. Clark	31 years	1938	1969	Southern University	Baton Rouge, LA	
Duke Kimbrough McCall	31 years	1951	1982	Southern Baptist Theological Seminary	Louisville, KY	
Athens Clay Pullias	31 years	1946	1977	Lipscomb University	Nashville, TN	
Claybrook Cottingham	31 years	1910	1941	Louisiana College	Pineville, LA	
R. M. Good	31 years	1921	1952	College of the Ozarks	Point Lookout, MO	
John L. Lahey	31 years	1987	2018	Quinnipiac University	Hamden, CT	
Diana Natalicio	31 years	1988	2019	University of Texas at El Paso	El Paso, TX	
Thomas Welder	31 years	1978	2009	University of Mary	Bismarck, ND	
Richard E. Wylie	31 years	1987	2018	Endicott College	Beverley, MA	
Henry T. Yang	31 years	1994	2025	University of California, Santa Barbara	Santa Barbara, CA	Longest serving Chancellor in the history of the University of California
Curtis L. Ivery	30 years	1995	present	Wayne County Community College District	Metro-Detroit, MI	
Thomas Duckett Boyd	30 years	1896	1926	Louisiana State University	Baton Rouge, LA	Previously served as interim President of LSU in 1886
Daniel R. Chamberlain	30 years	1976	2006	Houghton College	Houghton, NY	
Richard V. Clearwaters	30 years	1956	1986	Central Baptist Theological Seminary of Minneapolis	Plymouth, MN	
Ernest O. Holland	30 years	1915	1945	Washington State University	Pullman, WA	
Freeman A. Hrabowski III	30 years	1992	2022	University of Maryland Baltimore County	Baltimore, MD	
Lincoln Hulley	30 years	1904	1934	Stetson University	DeLand, FL	
William P. Leahy	30 years	1996	2026	Boston College	Chestnut Hill, MA	
William L. Proctor	30 years	1971	2001	Flagler College	St. Augustine, FL	Chancellor from 2001 to 2020.
Carol Jean Vale	30 years	1992	2022	Chestnut Hill College	Philadelphia, PA	

== See also ==
- Academic Administration
- Chancellor (education)
- Higher education in the United States
- List of leaders of universities and colleges in the United States
