= John Y. Gotanda =

American attorney and academic administrator

5th President of Hawaii Pacific University
- Incumbent
- Assumed office July 1, 2016
- Preceded by: Geoffrey Bannister

Dean of Villanova University School of Law
- In office 2011–2016
- Preceded by: Mark Sargent
- Succeeded by: Mark C. Alexander

Personal details
- Born: Hawaii, U.S.
- Education: University of Hawaiʻi at Mānoa (BBA, JD)

John Yukio Gotanda is an American attorney and academic administrator who has worked as the president of Hawaii Pacific University since July 1, 2016.

== Early life and education ==
Gotanda was born and raised in Hawaii.

From the University of Hawaiʻi at Mānoa, Gotanda received a Bachelor of Business Administration with a major in management in 1984 and a Juris Doctor in 1987.

== Career ==
After graduating from law school, Gotanda served as a staff attorney with the United States Court of Appeals for the District of Columbia Circuit. He then joined Covington & Burling in Washington, D.C. an associate attorney and later joined Goodwin Procter in Boston. In 1994, Gotanda joined the faculty of Villanova University as a law professor, where he later served as Associate Dean for Academic Affairs, Associate Dean for Faculty Research, Director of the J.D./M.B.A. Program, and Dean of the Villanova University School of Law from 2011 to 2016, and became President of Hawai‘i Pacific University, the largest private university in the State of Hawaiʻi on July 1, 2016.
