= Chatt =

Chatt is a surname. Notable people with the surname include:

- Bob Chatt (1870–1955), English footballer
- Chatt G. Wright, university president
- Hicham Chatt (born 1969), Moroccan long-distance runner
- Joseph Chatt (1914–1994), British scientist

== See also ==
- Chattanooga, Tennessee
