= Anna Watson =

Anna Watson may refer to:

- Anna Watson (comics), Marvel Comics character
- Anna Watson (politician), Australian politician
- Anna Watson (cheerleader), American fitness model and cheerleader
- Anna Lo (1950–2024), Northern Irish politician, also known as Anna Watson
