= Francyne Wase-Jacklick =

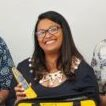
- Born: Majuro
- Education: Hawaii Pacific University et al
- Occupation: Secretary of Health
- Employer: Ministry of Health
- Predecessor: Jack Niethendal

Francyne Wase-Jacklick is a health professional in the Republic of the Marshall Islands (RMI). In 2024 she was the Secretary of Health and Human Services.

== Life ==
Wase-Jacklick comes from the capital of the Marshall Islands, Majuro. She graduated in biology from the Hawaii Pacific University.

She was one of five students from the Marshall Islands who were invited to join the two dozen identified for the Pacific Executive Leadership Development Program. Her graduation in 2019 in Hawaii was overseen by President Hilda Heine and the students were congratulated by the US Department of the Interior's Douglas Domenech.

In February 2016 the first Zika virus outbreak was reported in the Marshall Islands. Wase-Jacklick was put in charge of communications.

In 2018 she was the RMI's Deputy Secretary for Health when she was looking at the effects of climate change.

RMI was over years behind some nations and it did not receive its first community transmitted cases until 2022 and the health secretary was Jack Niethendal. RMI had vaccinated 70% of its population, but it had thousands of cases. Taiwan assisted and RMI received over 57m$ from USAID during its COVID-19 pandemic. This included over 150 computers. In 2023, it was recognised that the RMI had the highest rate of cervical cancer in women aged 20 to 40 in the world. An elimination programme was agreed and this was signed by the health Minister Ota Kisino and Secretary Francyne Wase-Jacklick at the 34th Women United Together Marshall Islands Conference in 2023.

On 2024 Wase-Jacklick was monitoring hospitals and making awards as the RMI Secretary of Health.
