= Richard Gouse Field at Brown Stadium =

Football stadium of Brown University

Brown Stadium
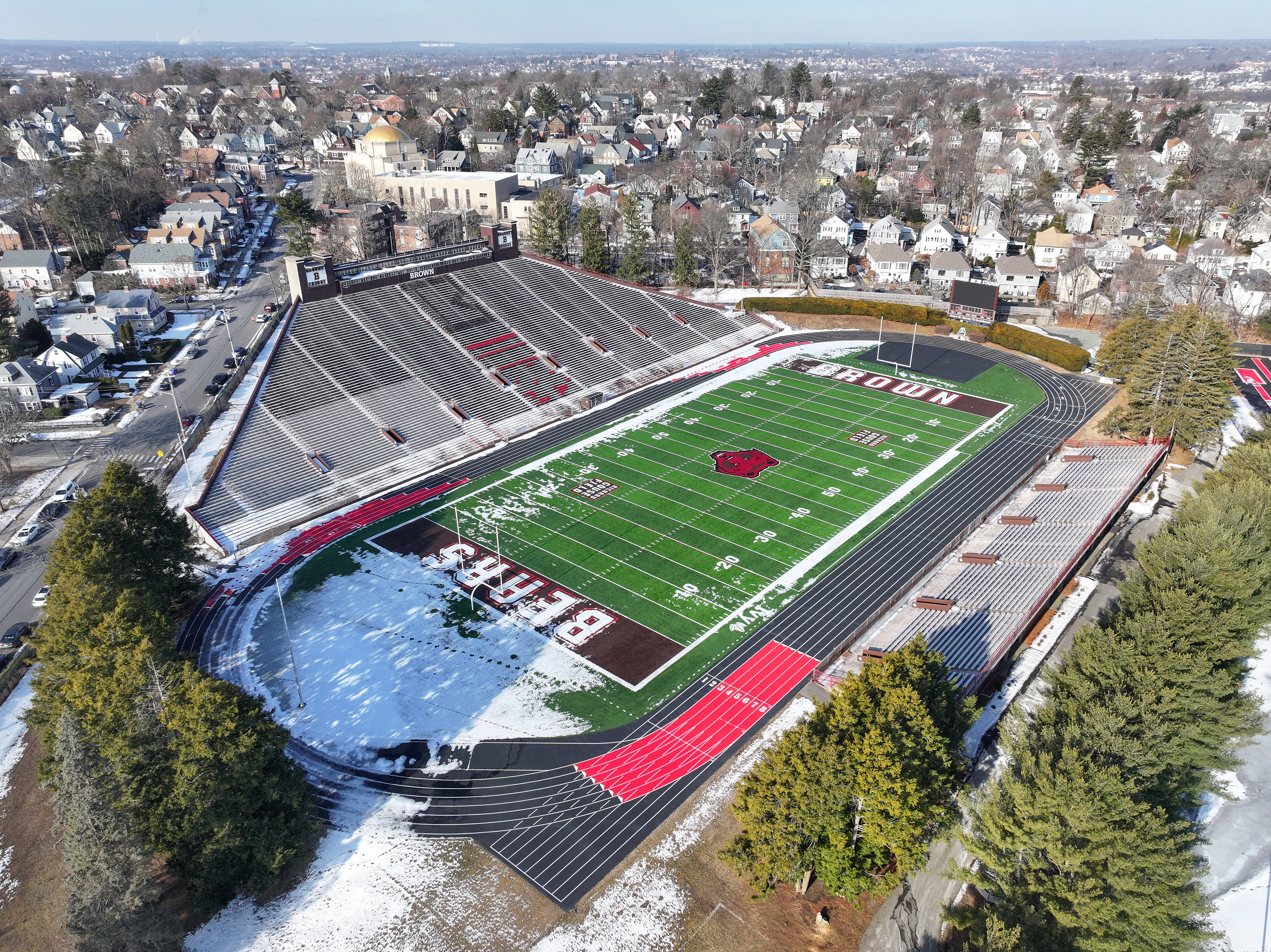
- Brown Stadium in 2025
- Interactive map of Brown Stadium
- Former names: Brown University Field
- Location: 400 Elmgrove Ave, Providence, RI 02906
- Coordinates: 41°50′32″N 71°23′40″W
- Owner: Brown University
- Operator: Brown University
- Capacity: 20,000
- Surface: FieldTurf (2021–present); Grass (Prior to 2021)

Construction
- Opened: October 24, 1925

Tenant
- Brown Bears (NCAA) (1925–present)

Richard Gouse Field at Brown Stadium is a football stadium located in Providence, Rhode Island. It is the home of Brown University's football and outdoor track teams. The athletic teams at Brown University, known as the Bears, compete in the Ivy League. Brown was the last Ivy stadium with a grass playing field until the installation of a FieldTurf surface in 2021. The field is named for Richard I. Gouse '68, the primary donor of the turf field.

== Location and description ==
Richard Gouse Field at Brown Stadium is located on Elmgrove Avenue in the city's East Side, approximately 3/4 of a mile from the rest of the athletic facilities and over a mile from the main campus. The architectural design features a trapezoid-shaped southwest stands and a smaller section of concrete bleachers on the northeast side. Stands sit on both sides of the field along with a running track. The press box traverses the entire top of the southwest stands, and the rear of the southwest side includes several ornate "B" logos and the university's seal, as well as two stone bear's heads on either end of the stands.

The stadium's current capacity is 20,000. The largest crowd ever recorded at the stadium was for the Brown vs. Colgate game on Thanksgiving morning 1932; portable bleachers were brought in to accommodate 33,000 fans.

== History ==
In the early years of Brown sports, the football teams played at Adelaide Park in Elmwood or on the university campus. In 1897, Brown was given land just west of Hope Street about a mile and a half north of campus, on which it built Andrews Field. This combined football/baseball field and running track was used from 1899 to 1925.

Brown Stadium, originally known as Brown University Field, constructed on the other side of Hope Street and slightly to the south, was financed entirely by subscription. The new field was dedicated on October 24, 1925, before a crowd of 27,000 spectators. The north stands are considerably smaller than the south ones, designed to allow for future expansion to mirror the large south ones and bring the stadium's fixed seating capacity to 32,000, but this expansion was never constructed. Adjacent to the field was Aldrich Baseball Field, and across Elmgrove Avenue was Marvel Gymnasium, completed in 1927.

=== Improvements ===
Richard Gouse Field

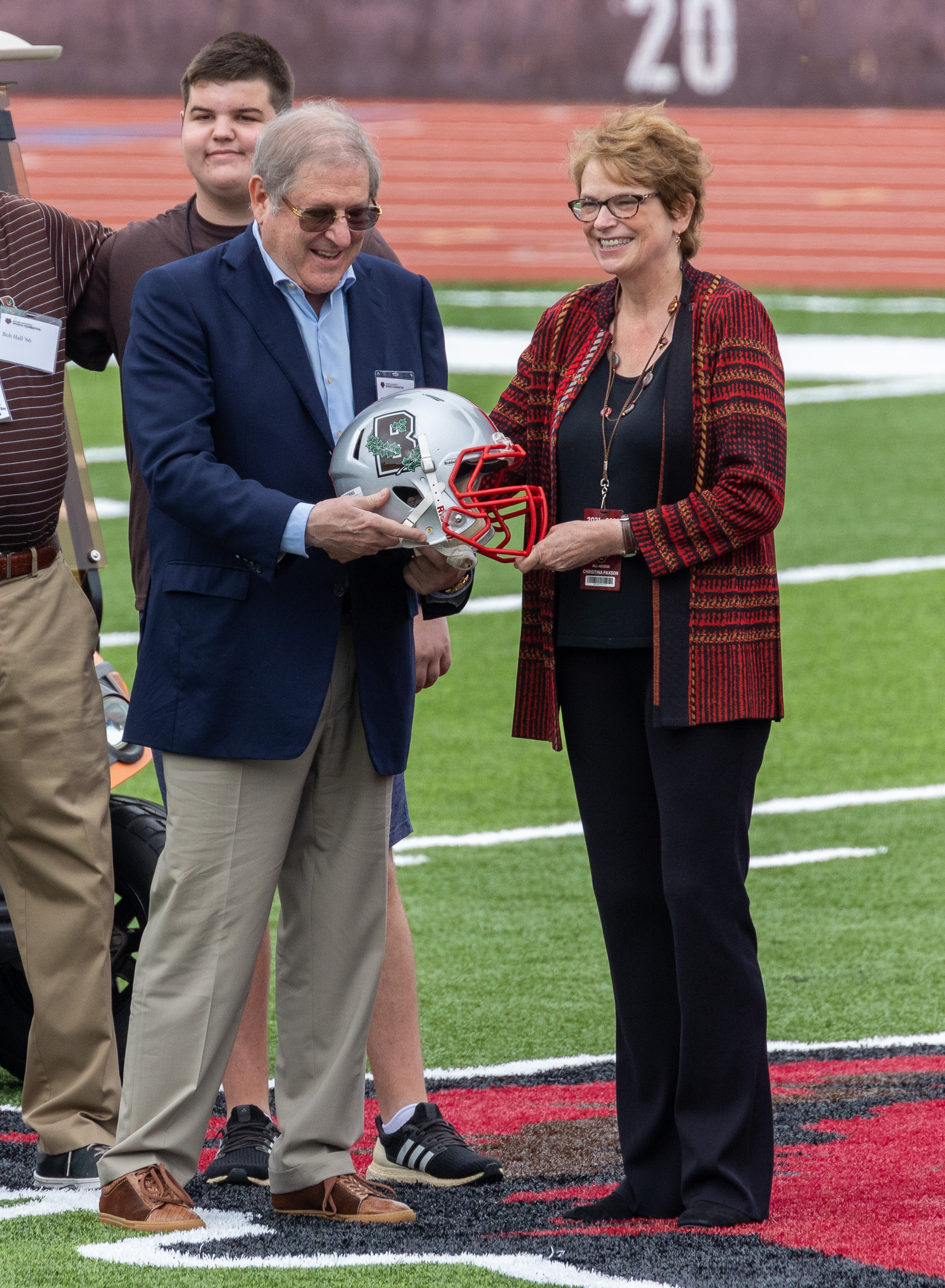
Brown president Christina Paxson honors donor Richard I. Gouse '68

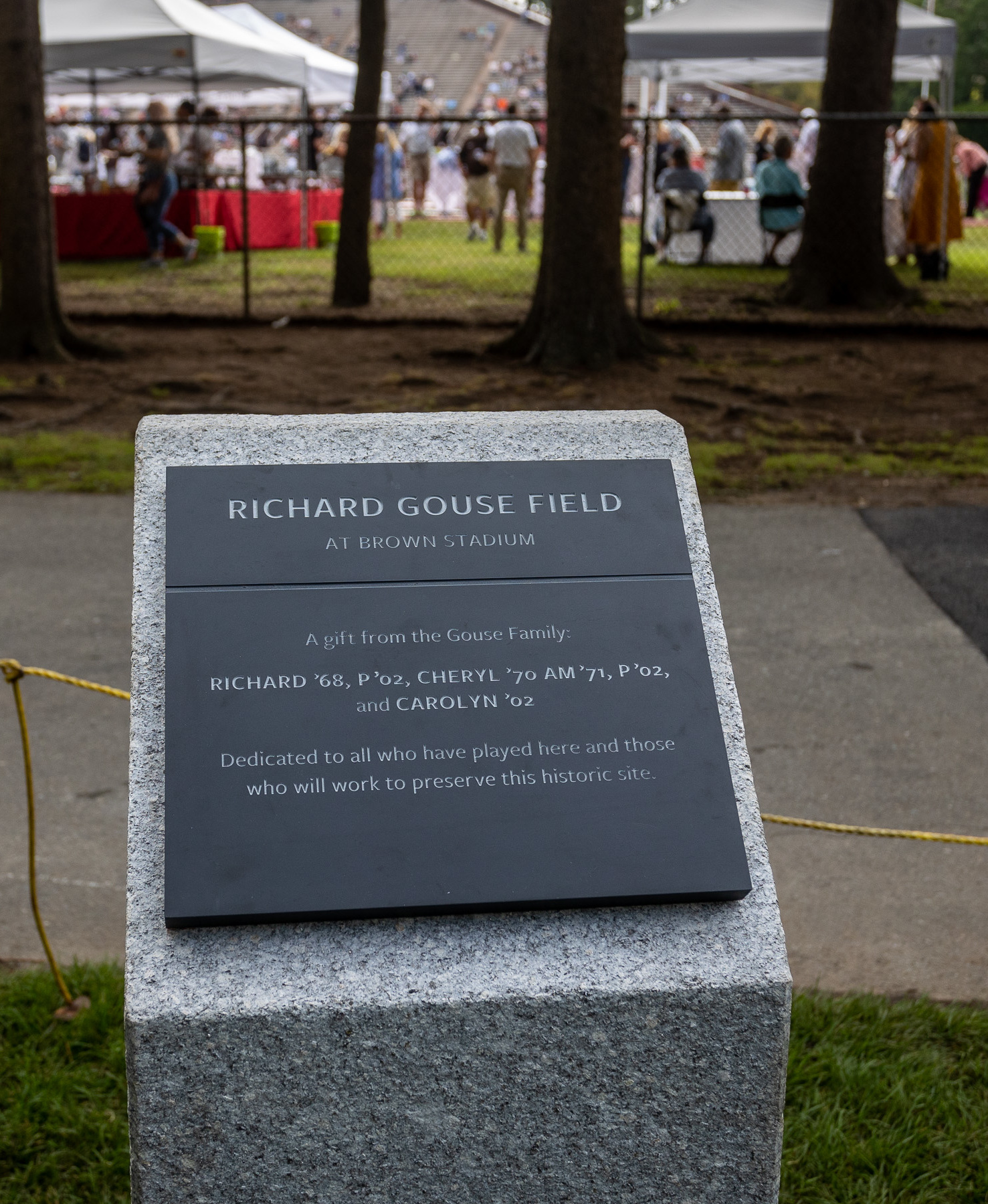
Dedication plaque

In 1978 the stadium was completely renovated as part of the football team's 100th anniversary. The original wooden benches were replaced with aluminum. The concrete was restored and waterproofed, and the restrooms, press box, and graphics were painted. an underground sprinkler was installed.

In 1991 a new home team locker room and reception room were constructed.

The stadium's first night game was played on September 25, 2010, as Brown defeated Harvard, 29–14, before a crowd of 17,000 fans.

=== Richard Gouse Field ===
Brown was the last of the Ivies to play on a grass playing surface. The grass field, used for nearly a century, was oddly "domed" in the middle, an anomaly among football fields and a potential injury risk. In summer 2021 a "perfect" FieldTurf surface was installed in time for that year's fall football season. The new field, named after primary donor Richard I. Gouse '68, is said to be faster and safer than the previous grass surface. The first game played on the new field was the 2021 Governor's Cup against the Rhode Island Rams, which was also Brown's first game after a yearlong hiatus due to COVID-19.

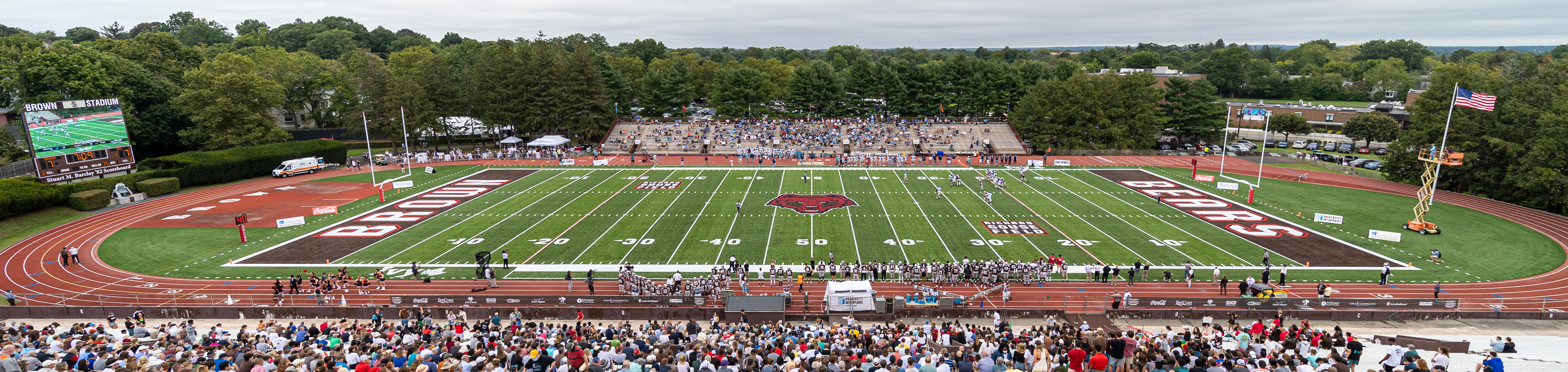
View from the main grandstand looking toward the field and the visitors stands. Scoreboard at left. Brown-URI football game, September 18, 2021.

== Notable events ==
Brown has had many successful teams since the stadium opened, including the Iron Man team of 1926, when eleven players played the entirety of two games and most of a third; the 1976, 1999, 2005, and 2008 Ivy League championship teams; as well as players such as Joe Paterno, former head football coach at Penn State, and several former NFL stars such as Don Colo of the Cleveland Browns and Steve Jordan of the Minnesota Vikings. The stadium hosted the Division I NCAA Men's Lacrosse Championship in 1976 and 1985 and two quarterfinal matches of the 2016 NCAA Division I Men's Lacrosse Championship.

== Gallery ==
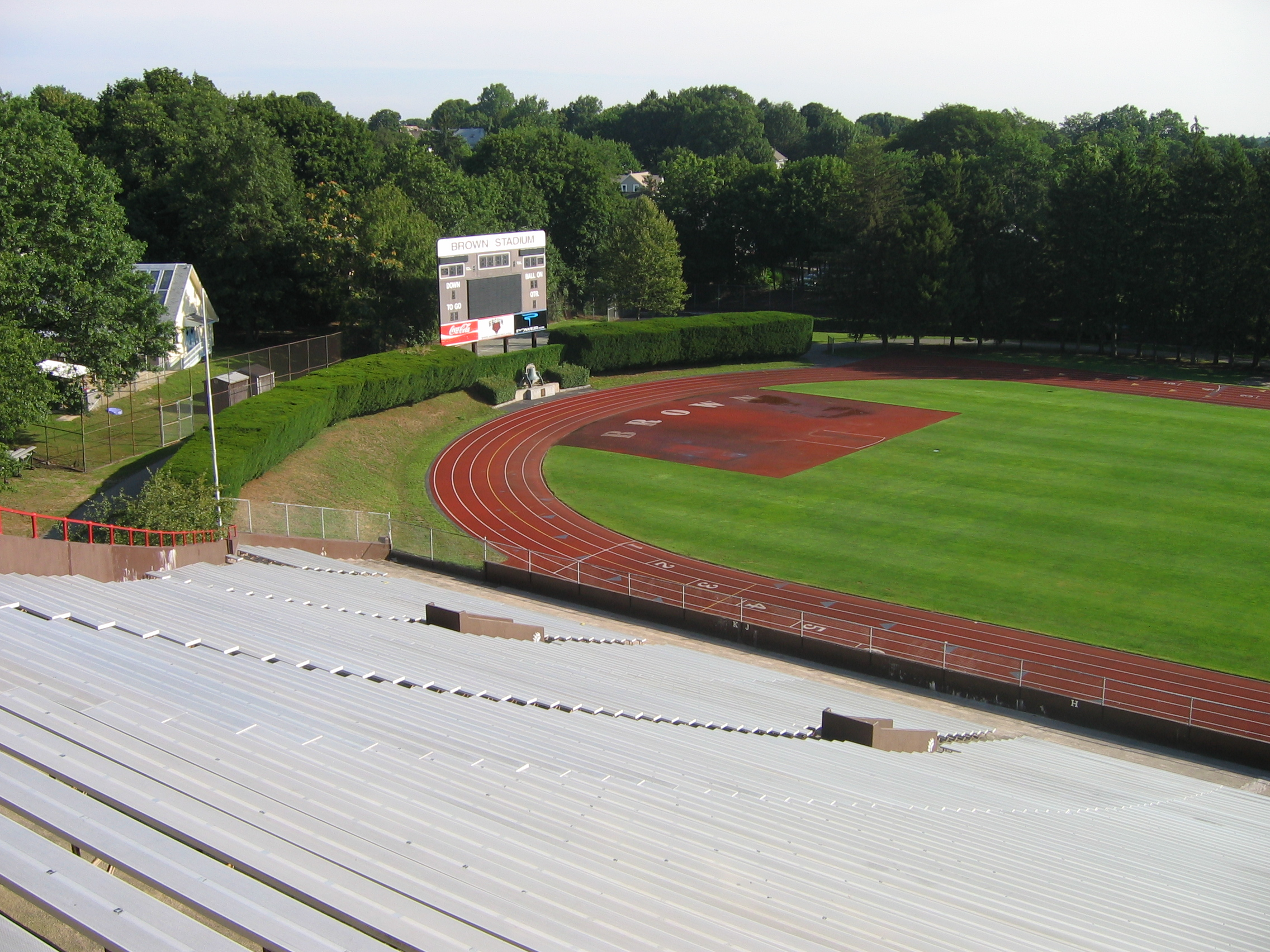
View from the grandstand, 2008

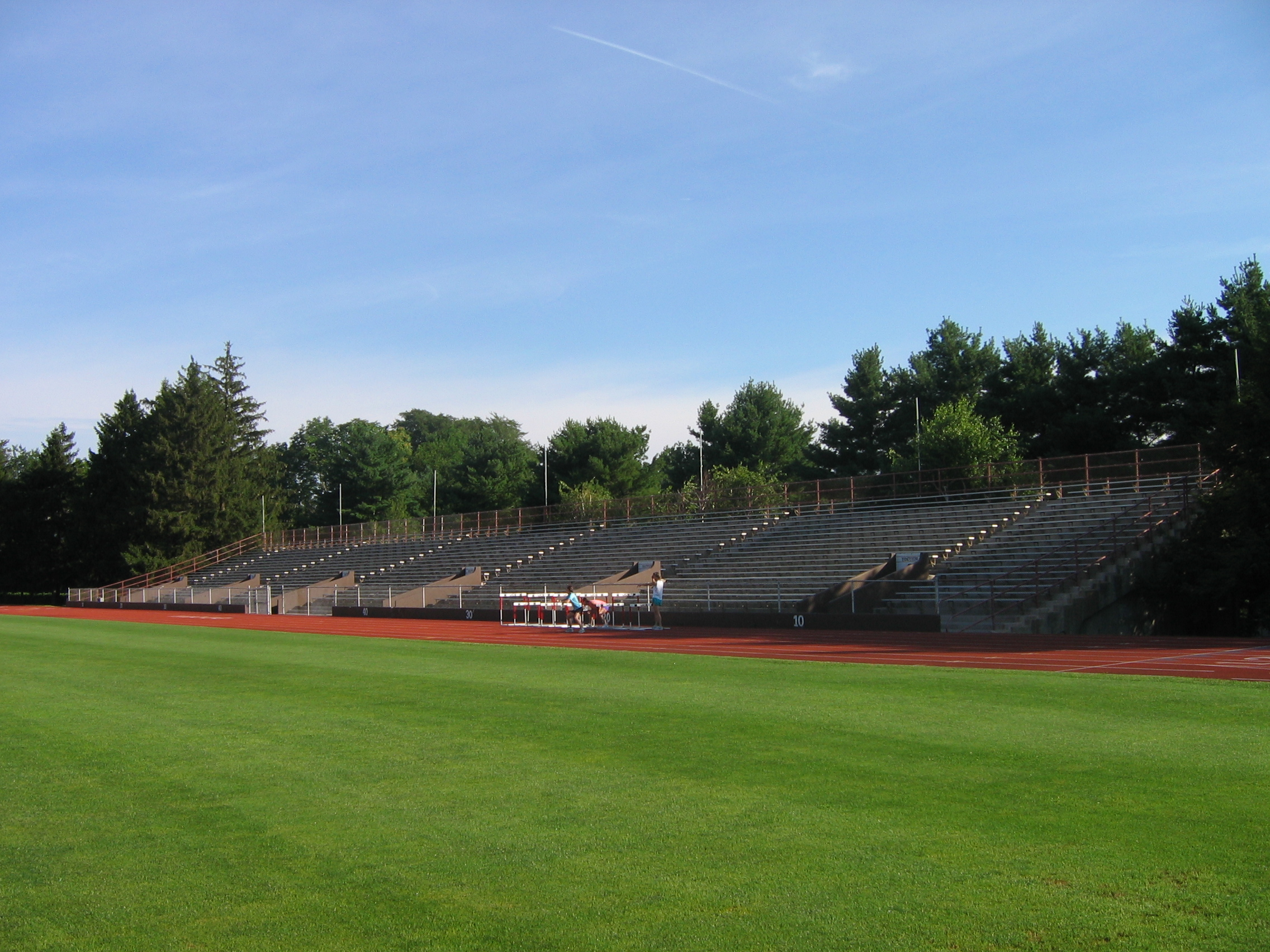
As seen in 2008

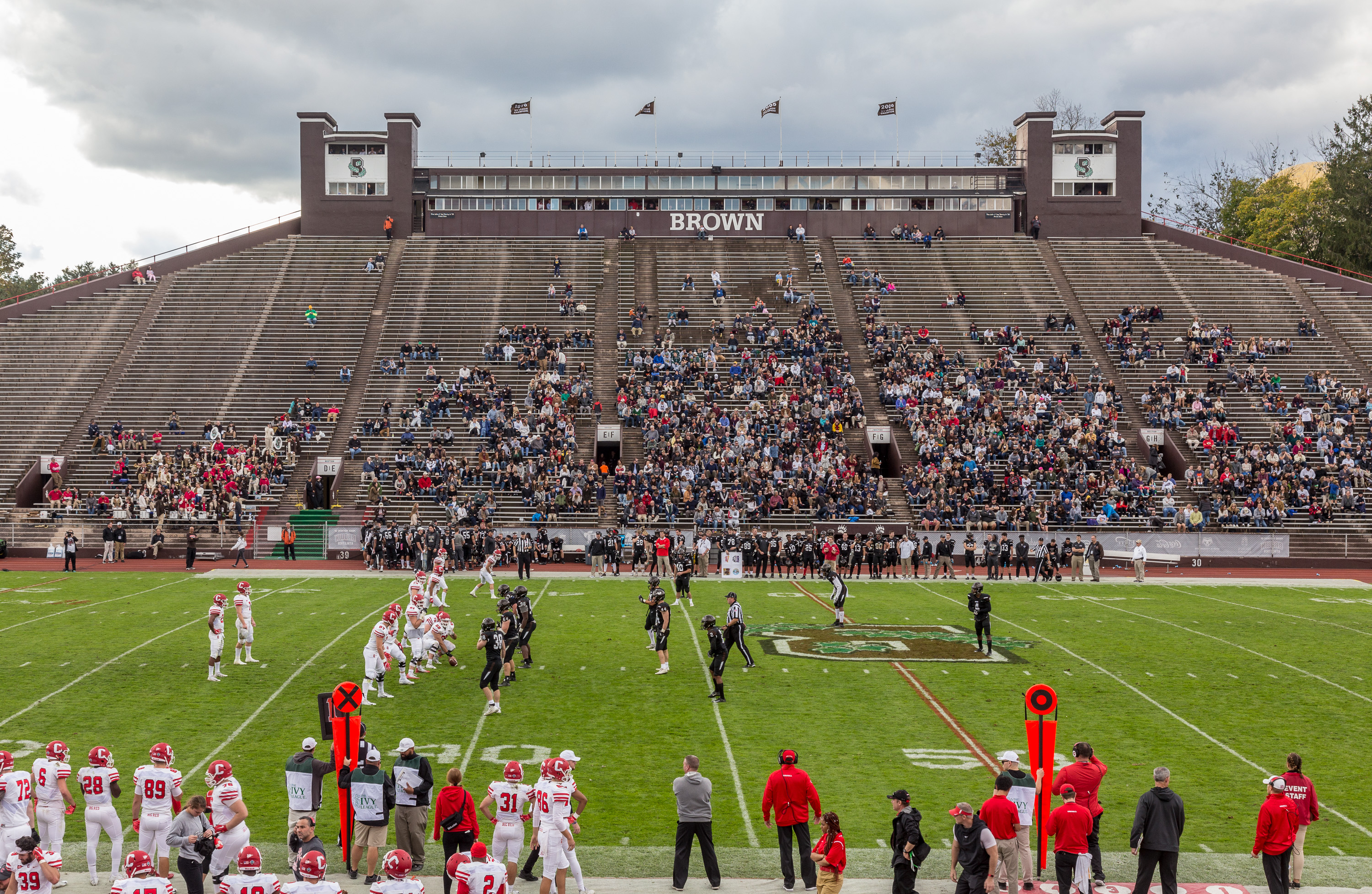
Brown vs. Cornell, Oct 20, 2018

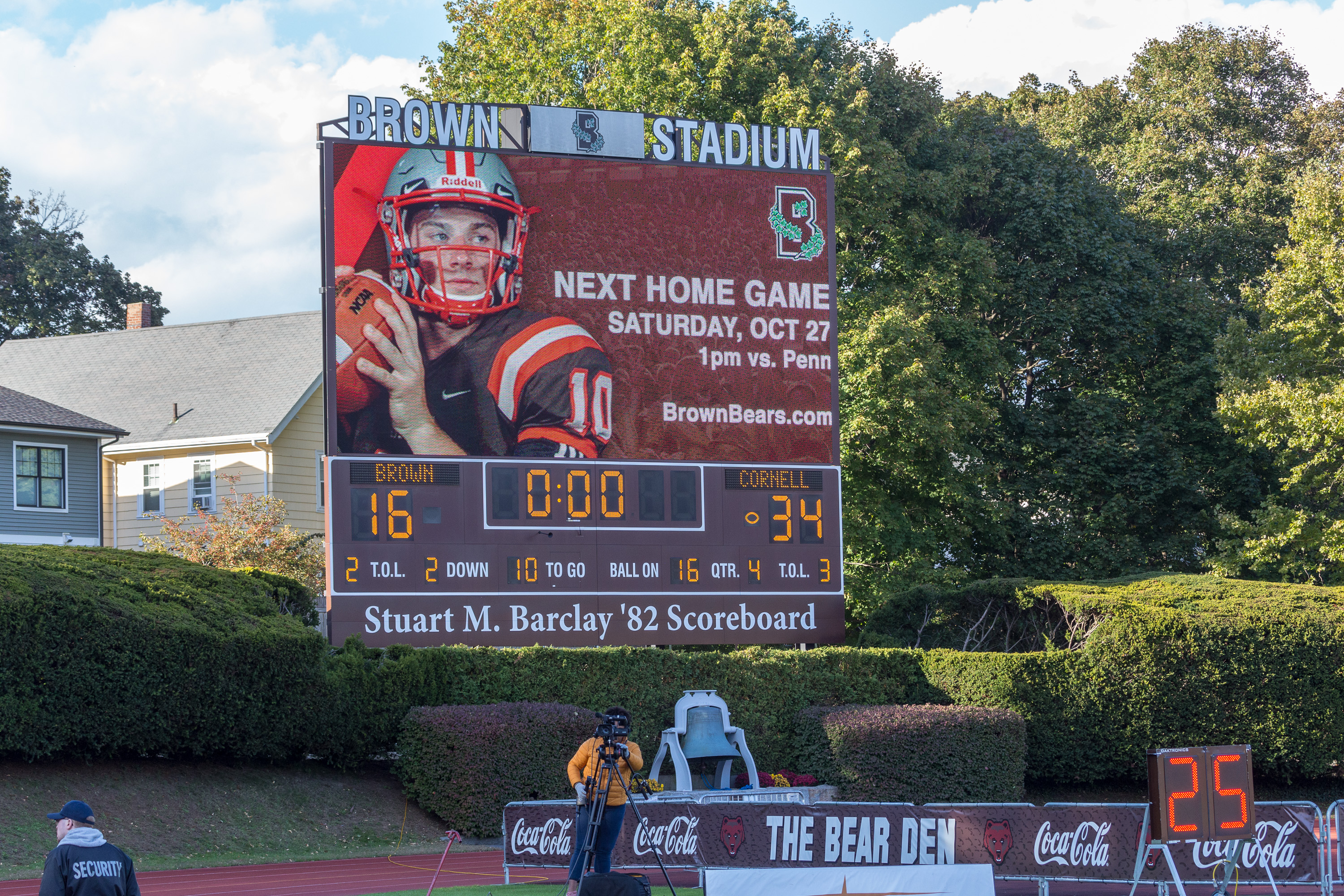
Scoreboard

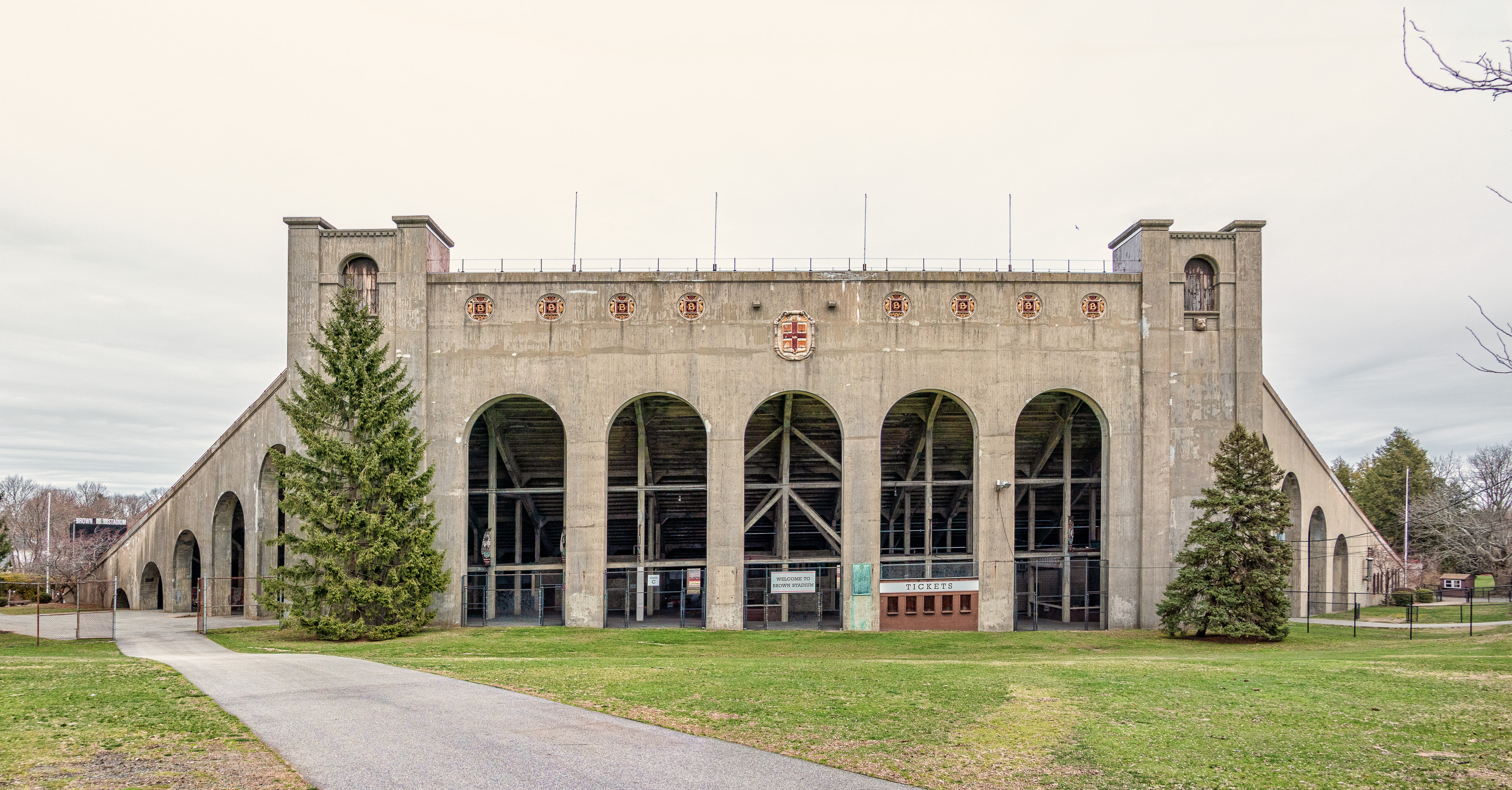
Entrance to Brown Stadium on Sessions Street

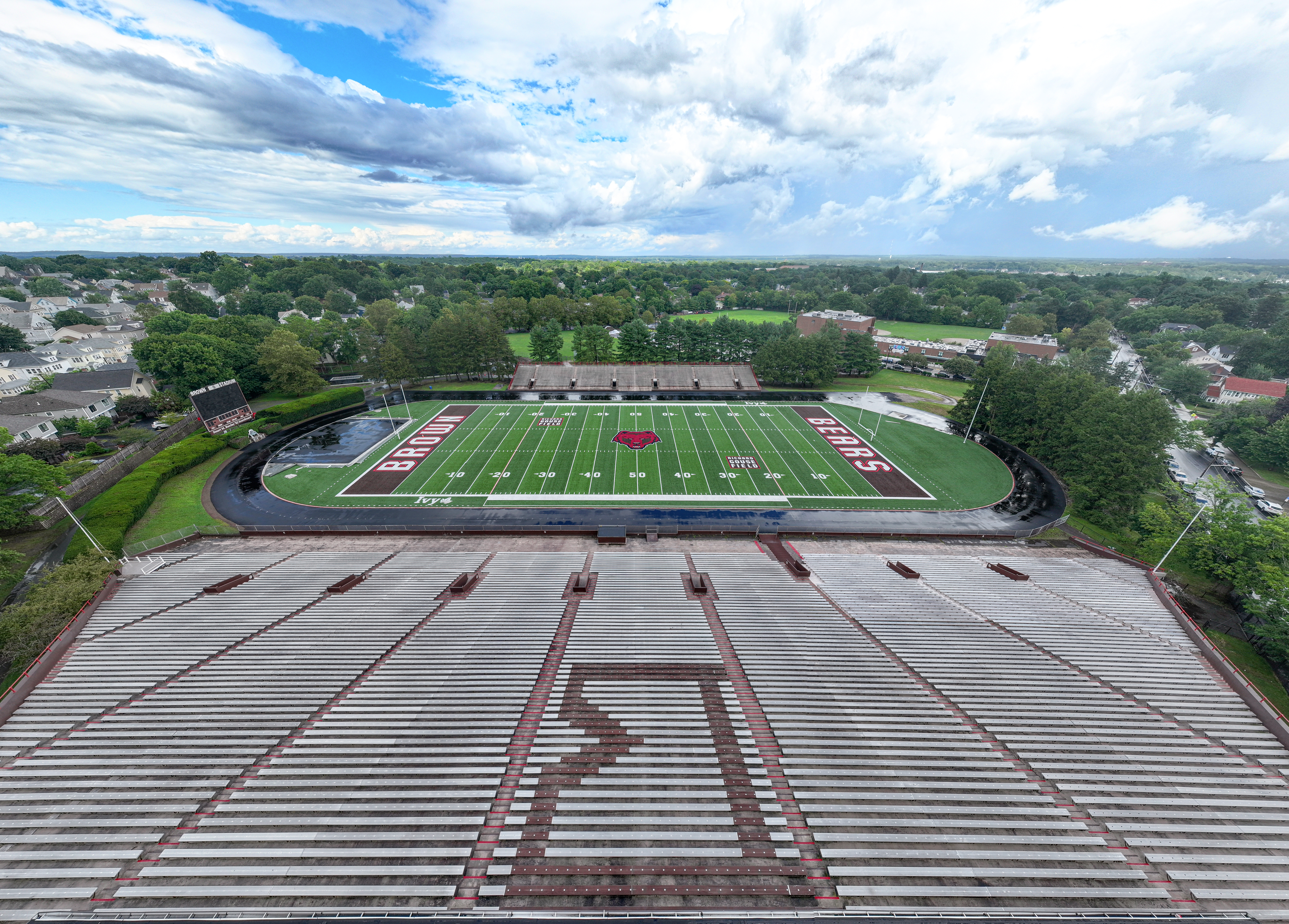
View from above the grandstand, 2023

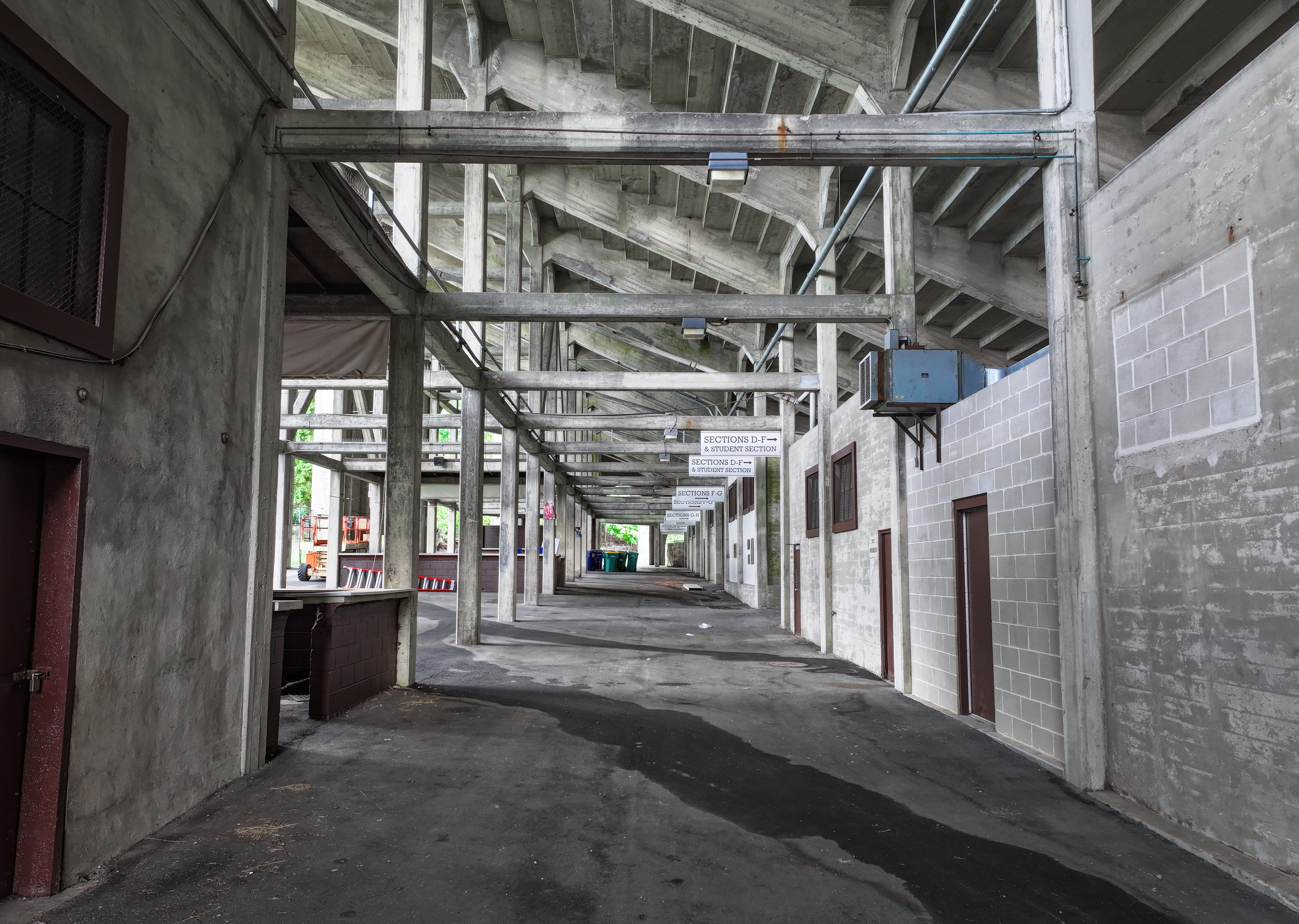
Inside the concourse

== See also ==
- List of NCAA Division I FCS football stadiums

Preceded by Rutgers Stadium	Host of the College Cup; 1964	Succeeded by Francis Field
