= Richard I. Gouse =

American academic

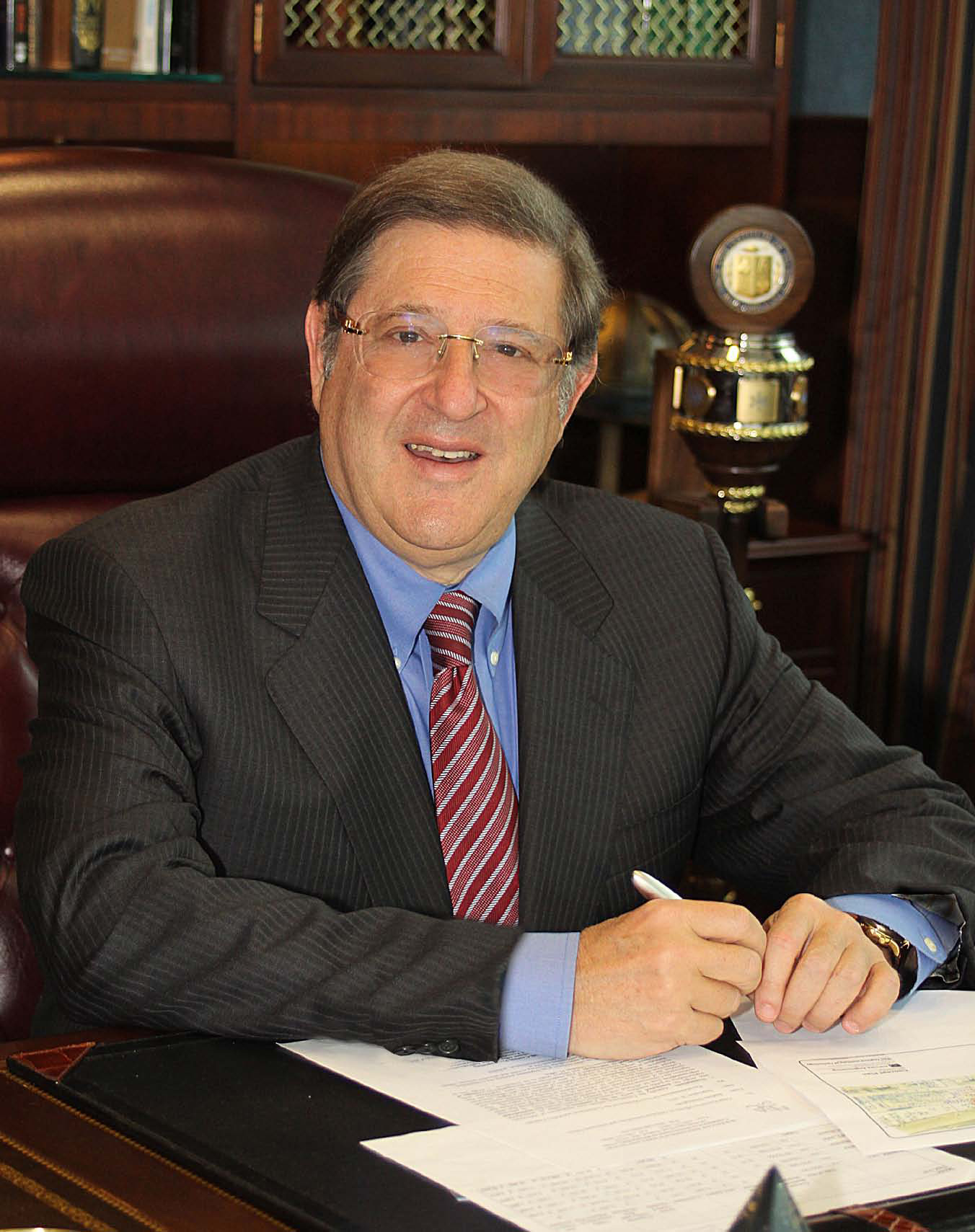
- Gouse in 2012

First President of the New England Institute of Technology
- Incumbent
- Assumed office 1971

Personal details
- Born: October 29, 1946 (age 79)
- Education: University of Poitiers; Brown University
- Occupation: University president

Richard I. Gouse (born October 29, 1946) is the president of the New England Institute of Technology. Gouse has held that position since 1971. He is one of the longest serving college presidents in American history.

== Education ==
In 1963, Gouse earned a Certificate of Study from the University of Poitiers in France, and in 1968 he earned a Bachelor of Arts degree from Brown University, majoring in Economics and minoring in education.

== Career ==
The Massachusetts Trade Shop School had been founded by Gouse's grandfather, James Gouse, in the 1930s, and his father, Julian Gouse, succeeded his grandfather in running the school in the 1950s. Gouse worked at the Massachusetts Trade Shop School as a laborer in the tool crib for the machine shop in the late 1950s and 1960s.

In 1968, Gouse started at the Rhode Island Trade Shop School and oversaw the initial accreditation of the school by the National Association of Trade and Technical Schools – an organization in which his father was a founding director.

In 1971, Gouse became President of the then New England Technical Institute, which had been founded by Ernest Earle in 1940. The school that Gouse inherited had four programs of study, seventy students and ten employees.

In 1976, Gouse led the effort to change the New England Technical Institute into a not-for-profit degree granting college and renamed it New England Institute of Technology. New England Institute of Technology has over 3,000 students, 35 degree-granting programs of study and 534 employees.

== Community involvement ==
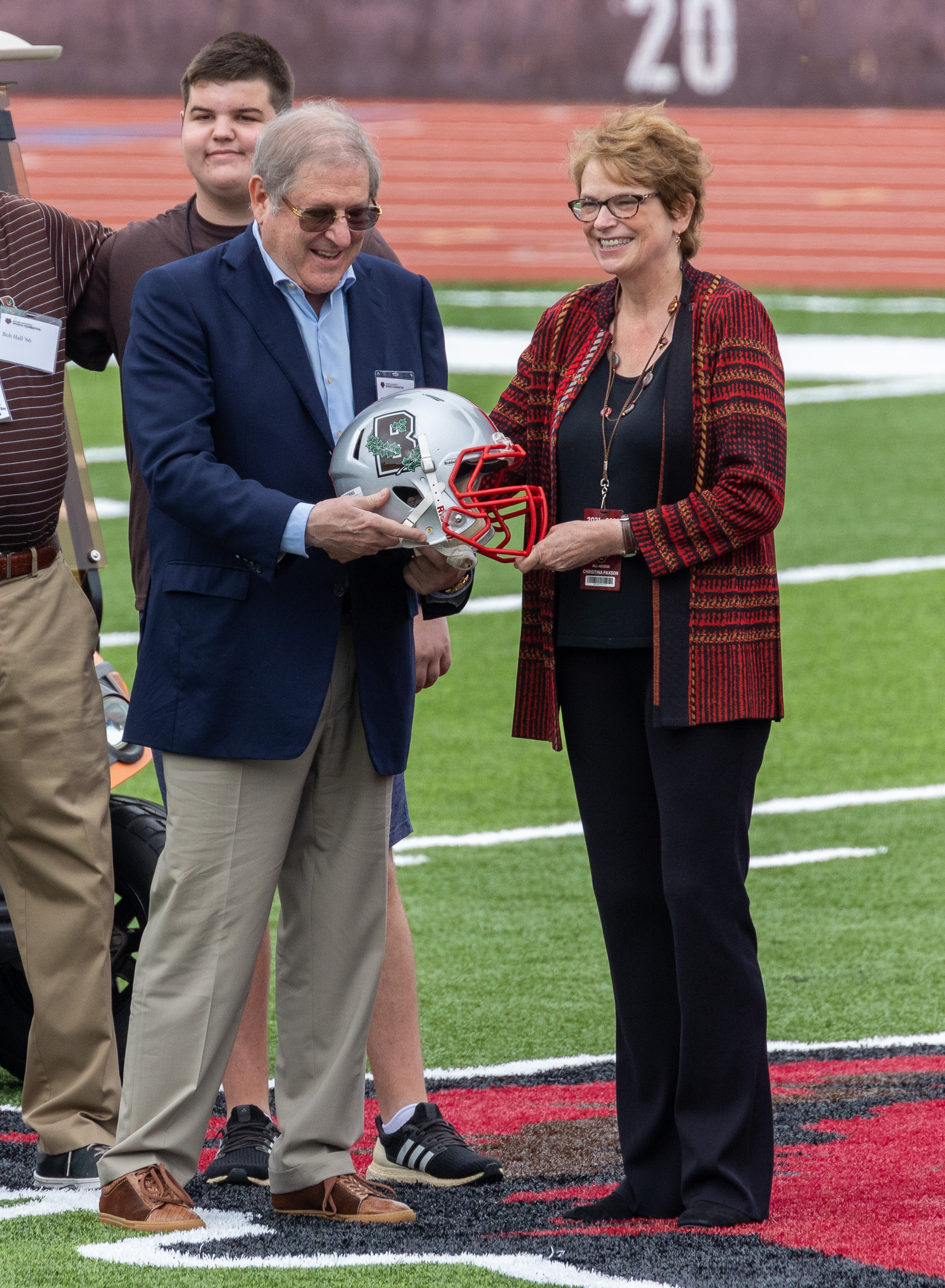
Brown President Christina Paxson honors Gouse, the primary donor of the Richard Gouse Field at Brown Stadium in 2021

- Member, Board of Incorporators, Kent County Memorial Hospital
- Member, Rhode Island Commodores
- Member, executive board, Brown Football Association
- Member, executive board, Brown Sports Foundation
- Past member, Board of Incorporators, Eastland Bank
- Past trustee, Providence Public Library

== Professional involvement ==
Gouse has served on numerous accreditation committees for the New England Association of Schools and Colleges' Commission on Vocational and Technical Career Institutions. He is a founding director of the Rhode Island College Crusade, and is also a member and former chair of the Rhode Island Association of Higher Education.

== Awards and recognitions ==
Gouse is a ‘Special Member’ of the Brown University Athletic Hall of Fame, along with his wife Cheryl. He has been recognized by the Ivy League through the Gouse Trophy, presented annually to the Ivy League Women's Tennis Champion. He is also a recipient of the prestigious Joslin Award, the Joukowsky Award, and the Jay Barry Service Award for his contributions to Brown University. Gouse was the lead donor of the Richard Gouse Field at Brown Stadium, a new artificial surface installed on Brown's football field in 2021.

In 2019, Gouse was inducted into the Rhode Island Heritage Hall of Fame and recognized as the longest-serving current U.S. college president.

== Personal background ==
Gouse resides in Barrington, Rhode Island, with his wife Cheryl (Connors) Gouse. They have one daughter, Carolyn. His interests include swimming, trapshooting and following his daughter's equestrian career.
