= Diana Natalicio =

American academic administrator (1939–2021)

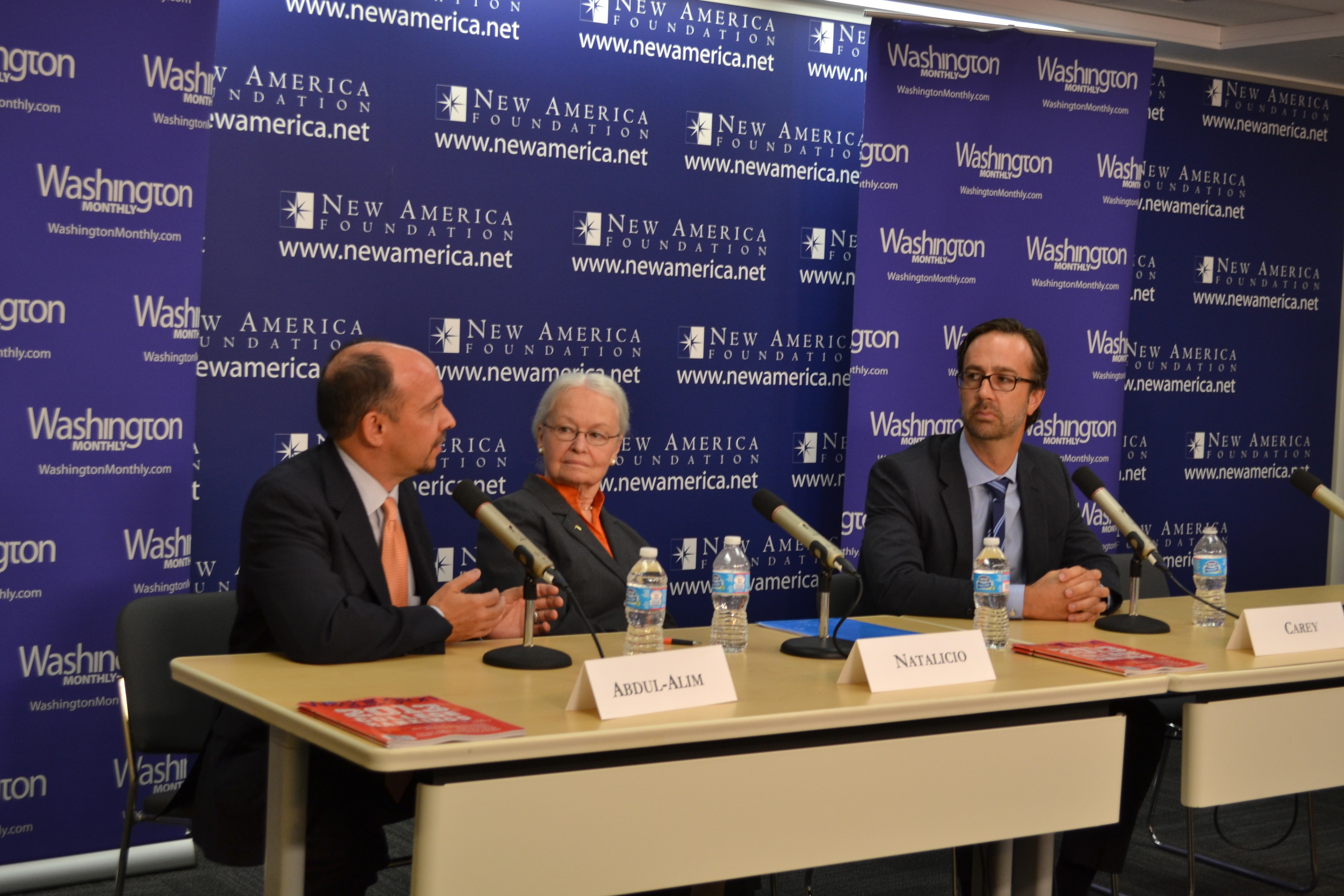

10th President of the University of Texas at El Paso
- In office February 11, 1988 – August 15, 2019
- Preceded by: Haskell Monroe
- Succeeded by: Heather Wilson

Personal details
- Born: Diana Siedhoff; August 25, 1939 St. Louis, Missouri, U.S.
- Died: September 24, 2021 (aged 82) El Paso, Texas, U.S.
- Spouse: Luiz Natalicio (m. 1966; div. ?)
- Education: Saint Louis University (BA); University of Texas, Austin (MA, PhD)
- Awards: Texas Women's Hall of Fame; Clark Kerr Award (2019)

Diana Natalicio (née Diana Siedhoff; August 25, 1939 – September 24, 2021) was an American academic administrator who served as 10th president of the University of Texas at El Paso (UTEP) from 1988 to 2019. After growing up in St. Louis, Natalicio studied Spanish as an undergraduate, completed a master's degree in Portuguese and earned a doctorate in linguistics. She became an assistant professor at UTEP in 1971, and was named the first female president of the university on February 11, 1988.

As of February 2016, Natalicio had the longest tenure among incumbent presidents at major public research universities. In 2016 Natalicio was named to Time magazine's list of 100 most influential people. She was named president emerita of UTEP by the University of Texas System Board of Regents in August 2019.

== Early life and career ==
Natalicio was born Eleanor Diana Siedhoff in St. Louis in 1939. Her father William Siedhoff owned a small retail business and her mother Eleanor Josephine Bierman (Jo) was a homemaker. After high school, Natalicio took a job at the switchboard of a company called Nordberg Manufacturing. Natalicio said that she learned to operate the switchboard quickly, but about a month into the job she realized that she did not want to make it a career. She said that the desire for a more fulfilling career led her to enroll in college at Saint Louis University (SLU).

Natalicio said that when she entered SLU, she realized that her high school preparation had been subpar. While she said that she was behind in math and literature, Natalicio had taken Spanish in high school and had an aptitude for it. She earned an undergraduate degree in Spanish at SLU and was a Fulbright Scholar in Brazil. She completed a master's degree in Portuguese and a doctorate in linguistics at the University of Texas at Austin.

In 1971, Natalicio came to UTEP. She was hired as an assistant professor, and later served as the modern languages department chair, dean of the liberal arts college and vice president of academic affairs.

== UTEP presidency ==
In 1988, Natalicio became the president of UTEP. She was the school's first female president. One of her initial goals was to recruit a student body that reflected the demographics of El Paso County. The student body was 50 percent Hispanic in 1988; that figure had increased to 66 percent by 1998, not including approximately 1300 Mexican nationals. Between 1998 and 2013, the university's budget increased from about $65 million to over $400 million, and research expenditures increased ten-fold. The school has expanded its doctoral program offerings from one in 1988 to 22 in 2019.

As of February 2016, Natalicio had served as university president longer than any sitting president at a U.S. major public research university. She was criticized for low four-year graduation rates during her tenure (13 percent in 2013, compared to 2.6 percent in 1999), but she said that four-year graduation rates were not the most important measures of a university's success.

Natalicio served as president of UTEP for 31 years before she stepped down in August 2019. The University of Texas System Board of Regents named her President Emerita that month.

== Awards and honors ==
Natalicio won the Harold W. McGraw Prize in Education in 1997. She was inducted into the 1998–99 class of the Texas Women's Hall of Fame. In 2006, Natalicio received the Distinguished Alumnus Award from the University of Texas at Austin. In 2011, the Mexican government recognized Natalicio with the Order of the Aztec Eagle, the highest award given to non-Mexicans. She was the 2013 recipient of the Hesburgh Award from TIAA-CREF. She received the 2015 Carnegie Corporation of New York Academic Leadership Award.

In 2001, Natalicio received an honorary Doctor of Laws from Smith College. She was awarded an honorary Doctor of Humane Letters from Georgetown University in 2011.

In 2019, Natalicio received the Clark Kerr Award from the UC Berkeley Academic Senate for distinguished leadership in higher education.

== Service ==
In 2013, Natalicio was elected president of the board of directors for the American Council on Education. She served on the Committee on Underrepresented Groups and the Expansion of the Science and Engineering Workforce Pipeline of the National Academies of Sciences, Engineering, and Medicine. Natalicio was on the board of directors for the Hispanic Scholarship Fund. She was a principal investigator in a National Science Foundation program to increase participation in the STEM fields.
