= Sharon Diaz =

American nurse and university president (1981–2021)

Sharon Clark Diaz (July 29, 1946 – September 12, 2021) was an American nurse, healthcare administrator, and university president best known for her transformative leadership of Samuel Merritt University in Oakland, California. Serving as president from 1981 to 2018, Diaz guided the institution’s evolution from a small hospital-affiliated nursing school into a fully accredited health sciences university offering graduate and doctoral degrees across nursing, podiatric medicine, occupational therapy, and more.

Under her 36-year tenure, one of the longest in U.S. higher education at the time, Samuel Merritt dramatically expanded its academic offerings, campus footprint, and student body. Diaz was widely recognized for her advocacy of healthcare education rooted in service and community engagement, and her legacy includes the university’s expanded role in addressing workforce gaps in California’s health sector.

== Early life ==
Diaz was born as Sharon Clark on July 29, 1946, to Karl and Mildred (Lunn) Clark in Bakersfield, California. She attended San Jose State University, where she met her future husband Luis F. Diaz, then a mechanical engineering student. They were married in 1968, the same year that Sharon earned her bachelor's degree in nursing and became a registered nurse.
