= Geoffrey Bannister =

English-American educator and geographer

- Born: 1946 (age 79–80); Manchester, England

Academic background
- Education: University of Otago
- Thesis: Central Place Theory and the Distribution of Retail Centres within Dunedin (1969)

Geoffrey Bannister (born 1946, Manchester, England) is an English-American educator and geographer. He is the fourth president of Hawai'i Pacific University. His goals for the university were to expand the graduate program research as well as building connections with other universities around the world.

Bannister was born in Manchester, England. When he was 10 years old, his family moved to New Zealand. He completed a master's thesis on the distribution of retail centres in Dunedin in 1969, at the University of Otago.

He later moved to Toronto, Canada to get a doctorate in geography. He became a U.S. citizen in 1989.
