= Thomas Hanna McMichael =

College President

4th President of Monmouth College
- In office 1903–1936
- Minister: Presbyterian
- Preceded by: Samuel Ross Lyons
- Succeeded by: James Harper Grier

Personal details
- Born: July 7, 1863 Bellbrook, Ohio, US
- Died: June 23, 1938 (aged 74)
- Resting place: Monmouth Cemetery, Monmouth, Illinois, US
- Spouse(s): Minnie McDill 1890–1929 (her death), Nellie Logue 1934–1937 (her death)
- Education: Monmouth College (B.A, M.A.); United Presbyterian seminary (B.D.) (Xenia, Ohio); Westminster College (D.D.)

Thomas Hanna McMichael (July 7, 1863 – June 23, 1938) was the fourth president of Monmouth College of Illinois and was significant in elevating the stature of that college to national prominence. A Presbyterian minister, he was also elected Moderator of the Presbyterian Church of North America, its highest office.

== Biography ==
Born to Jackson Burgess and Mary Hanna McMichael, Thomas Hanna McMichael was born on July 7, 1863, at Bellbrook, Greene County, Ohio, and moved to Monmouth, Illinois with his parents in 1878 when his father began his duties as the second president of Monmouth College. Thomas enrolled in Monmouth College in 1882 and received the Bachelor of Arts degree with honors in 1886. He also received the Master of Arts from Monmouth College in 1889. He went on to earn the B.D. degree from the United Presbyterian seminary in Xenia, Ohio, in 1890. That year, he married Minnie McDill at the family home in Burlington, Iowa (Minnie died in 1929). He received the D.D. degree from Westminster College in Pennsylvania in 1903.

After a brief pastorate at Spring Hill, Indiana, he became the pastor of a large and influential church, the First United Presbyterian Church in Cleveland, Ohio (1892), which would later be known as the Old Stone Church, and remained there until elected president of Monmouth College (Illinois) in 1903, a position which he held until 1936. He is among the longest-serving presidents of a higher education institution in the United States.

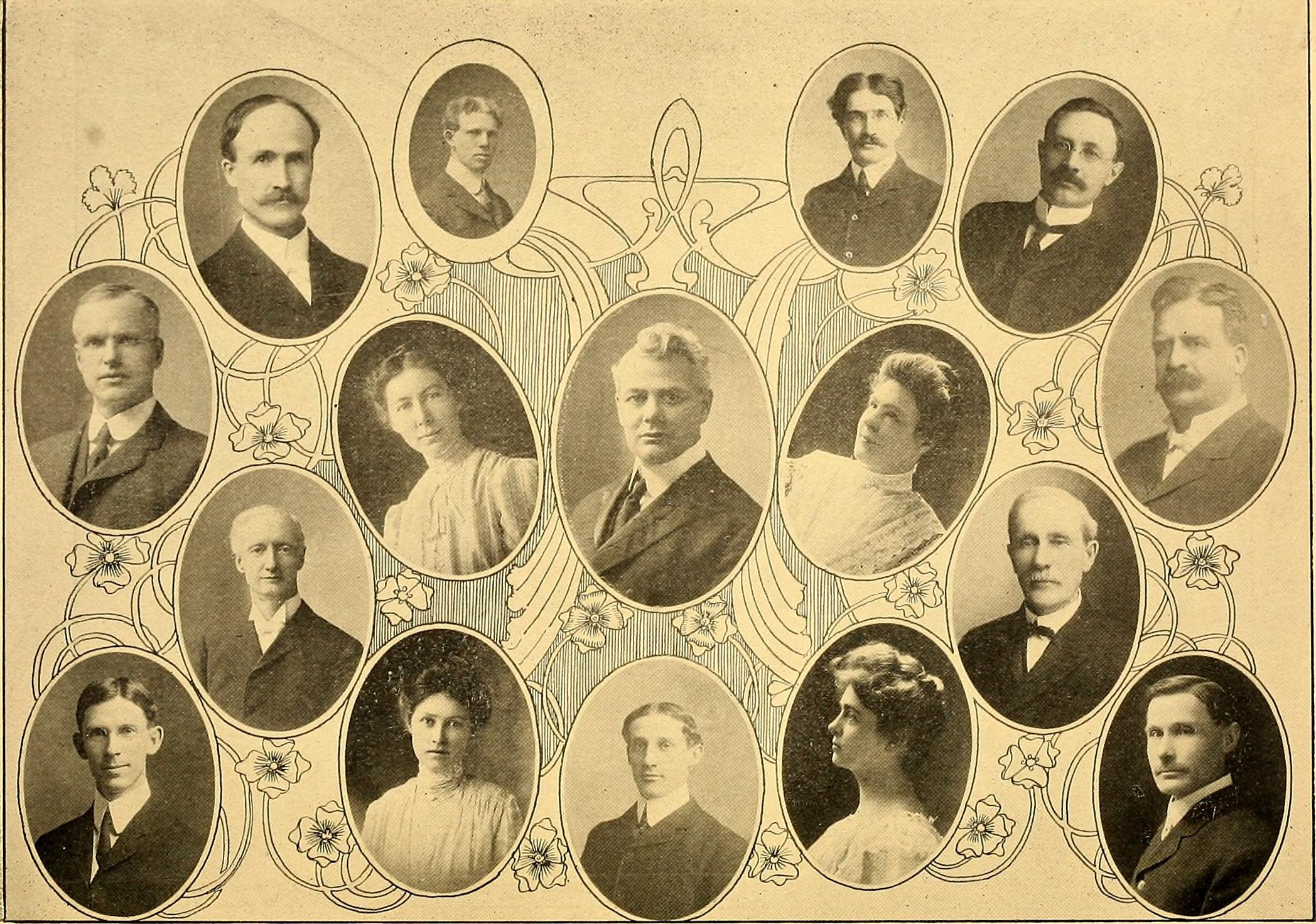
McMichael shown in the center with the other faculty of Monmouth College as seen in the college yearbook "The Ravelings" in 1906

During his presidency he rebuilt the campus following a disastrous fire in 1907 that destroyed the main academic building. New buildings included the addition of a Carnegie Library, a new main academic building named for the college's first president, a new science building, two women's residence halls and a new gymnasium designed by the noted architect Dan Everett Waid. He also modernized and expanded the curriculum. After his first eight years in office, the college was recognized in 1911 by the federal government as being of national standing and in roughly the top quintile of 345 colleges. Despite the large building program, the college endowment climbed from about $200,000 in 1903 to over $1,000,000 by 1927. Furthermore, the physical plant had increased from about $90,000 to a worth of $750,000 and the library had tripled its holdings.

He also modernized the social life of the campus including the re-establishment of Greek social organizations most notably the Alpha chapter of Pi Beta Phi, the oldest national women's fraternity (aka sorority), which had been founded at Monmouth College in 1867.

He was elected Moderator of the Presbyterian Church of North America, the highest office in the church, in 1915. He was also the founding president of the Chautauqua association in Monmouth in 1904. He married Nellie Logue in 1934 (who died in 1937).

He died on June 23, 1938.
