= Hawaii Pacific University =

Private university in Honolulu, Hawaii, US

Hawaiʻi Pacific University
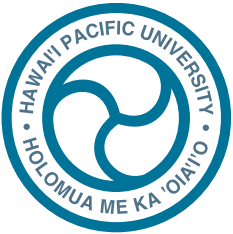
- Former names: Hawaiʻi Pacific College (1965); Hawaiʻi Pacific University (1990)
- Motto: Holomua Me Ka ʻOiaʻiʻo (Hawaiian)
- Motto in English: Forward With Truth
- Type: Private university
- Established: 1965; 61 years ago
- Academic affiliations: NAICU
- Endowment: $51.4 million (2026)
- President: John Y. Gotanda
- Students: 4,998
- Undergraduates: 4,260
- Postgraduates: 738
- Location: Honolulu and Las Vegas, Hawaii and Nevada, United States; 21.311°N 157.859°W
- Campus: Urban
- Colors: Blue and gray
- Nickname: Sharks
- Sporting affiliations: NCAA Division II – PacWest
- Mascot: Sharky the Shark
- Website: hpu.edu
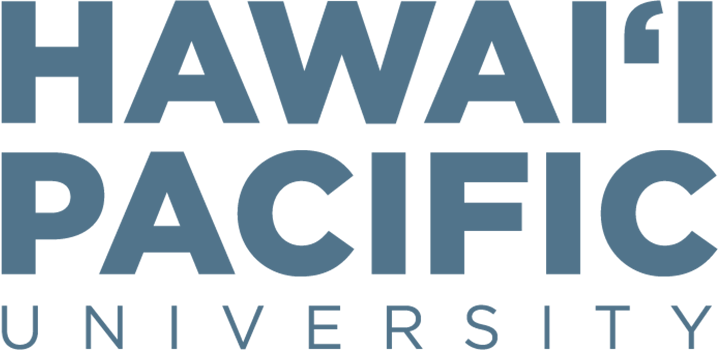

Hawaiʻi Pacific University (HPU) is a private university in Honolulu, Hawaiʻi, United States. The Oceanic Institute of HPU, an aquaculture research facility, is at Makapuʻu Point on the island of Oʻahu. HPU is also present at military installations on Oʻahu.

== History ==
HPU was founded in 1965 as Hawaiʻi Pacific College by Paul C. T. Loo, Eureka Forbes, Elizabeth W. Kellerman, and Edmond Walker. Wanting a private liberal arts college in Honolulu, the four applied for a charter of incorporation for a not-for-profit corporation to be called Hawaiʻi Pacific College. The state of Hawaiʻi granted Hawaiʻi Pacific a charter of incorporation on September 17, 1965.

In September 1966, Honolulu Christian College, established in 1949, merged into Hawaiʻi Pacific College, and a new charter was granted by the state of Hawaiʻi. In 1967, James L. Meader became Hawaiʻi Pacific College's first president. In consultation with community leaders, he developed a comprehensive educational program.

When Meader retired in 1968, the board of trustees elected George A. Warmer as Hawaiʻi Pacific's second president. During Warmer's tenure, the college implemented academic programs in the liberal arts and cooperative education.

In 1972, Hawaiʻi Pacific College graduated seven students in its first commencement class and established its School of Business Administration, of which Chatt G. Wright became the founding dean. In 1973, the college received full accreditation from the Western Association of Schools and Colleges. The following years saw the creation of the English Foundations Program, offering instruction to non-native speakers of English, and the Division of Special Programs, administering off-campus instruction at Oʻahu's military installations.

Warmer retired in 1976 and Wright became Hawaiʻi Pacific's third president. During his time in office, Hawaiʻi Pacific continued to expand and develop. Hawaiʻi Pacific launched a Master of Business Administration program in 1986, a Master of Science in Information Systems program in 1989, and a Master of Arts in Human Resource Management in 1991.

Hawaiʻi Pacific became Hawaiʻi Pacific University (HPU) in 1990. Two years later, Hawaii Loa College, a small, independent liberal arts college on Oʻahu's windward side, merged into HPU.

In 2004, the HPU International Vocal Ensemble made its Carnegie Hall debut, performing Morten Lauridsen's Lux Aeterna and O Magnum Mysterium.

In 2011, President Wright retired and Geoffrey Bannister became HPU's fourth president.

In 2013, the Aloha Tower Development Corporation (ATDC) consented to the university's ownership and management of the Aloha Tower Marketplace.

In 2014, HPU completed a merger to bring Oceanic Institute formally into the university. HPU held a ceremonial groundbreaking and traditional Hawaiian blessing at Aloha Tower Marketplace.

The $50 million Aloha Tower Marketplace revitalization project was completed in August 2015, opening to students and the community. Aloha Tower Marketplace anchors the university's downtown Honolulu campus, including a center for higher education and university housing integrated within a community gathering and retail space.

In 2016, John Yukio Gotanda took office as Hawaiʻi Pacific University's fifth president.

== Campus ==
=== Aloha Tower Marketplace and downtown Honolulu campus ===
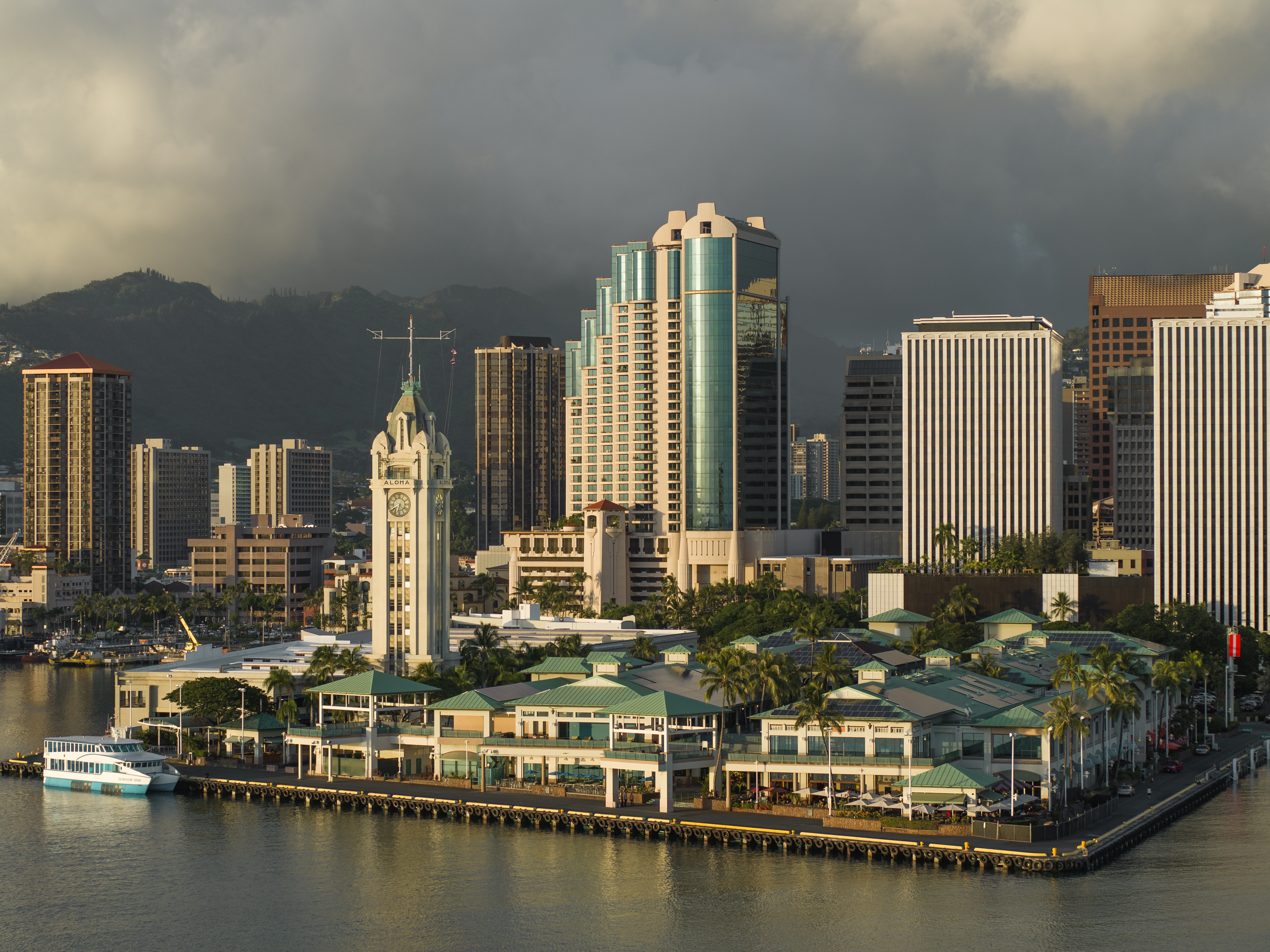
Aloha Tower Marketplace is home to HPU's main campus.

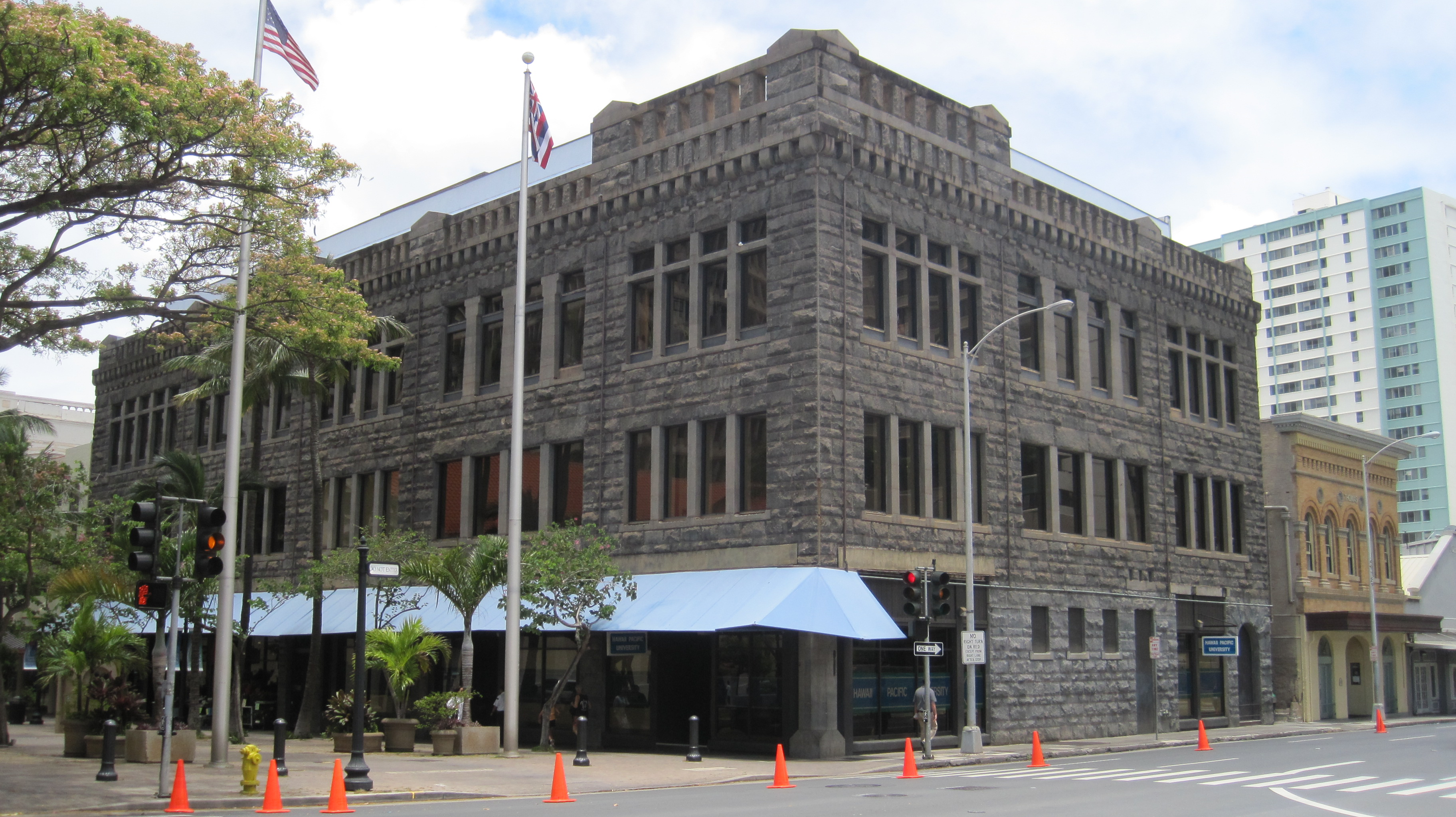
Model Progress building, Honolulu Campus

HPU's Aloha Tower Marketplace is a mixed-use facility that includes student housing, HPU's Welcome Center, Learning Commons, Lounge, Student Café, ESports Arena, and various restaurants, businesses, classrooms, and meeting rooms for university and community use. The campus was originally a festival marketplace developed by James W. Rouse in collaboration with an unnamed developer and opened in 1994; it struggled, and HPU took it over in the 2010s to revitalize it.

HPU's athletic department is centrally located in Honolulu's business district. HPU's College of Business is headquartered in Pioneer Plaza and includes computer-based classrooms along with meeting spaces. In 2016, HPU opened its downtown INBRE (IDeA Networks of Biomedical Research Excellence) research labs, providing students with biomedical instrumentation and laboratory facilities.

=== Oceanic Institute ===
The Oceanic Institute (OI) of HPU is a research facility focused on the advancement of sustainable aquaculture technologies. OI is on a 56-acre site at Makapuʻu Point on the windward coast of Oʻahu. OI conducts research, education, and training that focuses on marine aquaculture, aquatic feeds and nutrition, and coastal resource management. In 2013, OI commissioned a teaching laboratory to complement classroom and conference space at the Ocean Learning Center (OLC). The OLC annex supports biotechnology research and education with two research labs, a teaching lab, and a distance learning center.

=== Las Vegas campus ===
In 2024, Hawaiʻi Pacific University began operating its first campus outside Hawaiʻi in Las Vegas, Nevada. The campus supports the university’s Doctor of Occupational Therapy and Doctor of Physical Therapy programs, which combine online coursework with in-person laboratory instruction. The occupational therapy program enrolled its first Las Vegas cohort in 2024, and the physical therapy program began instruction there in January 2025. HPU held a formal grand opening for the campus on February 18, 2025.

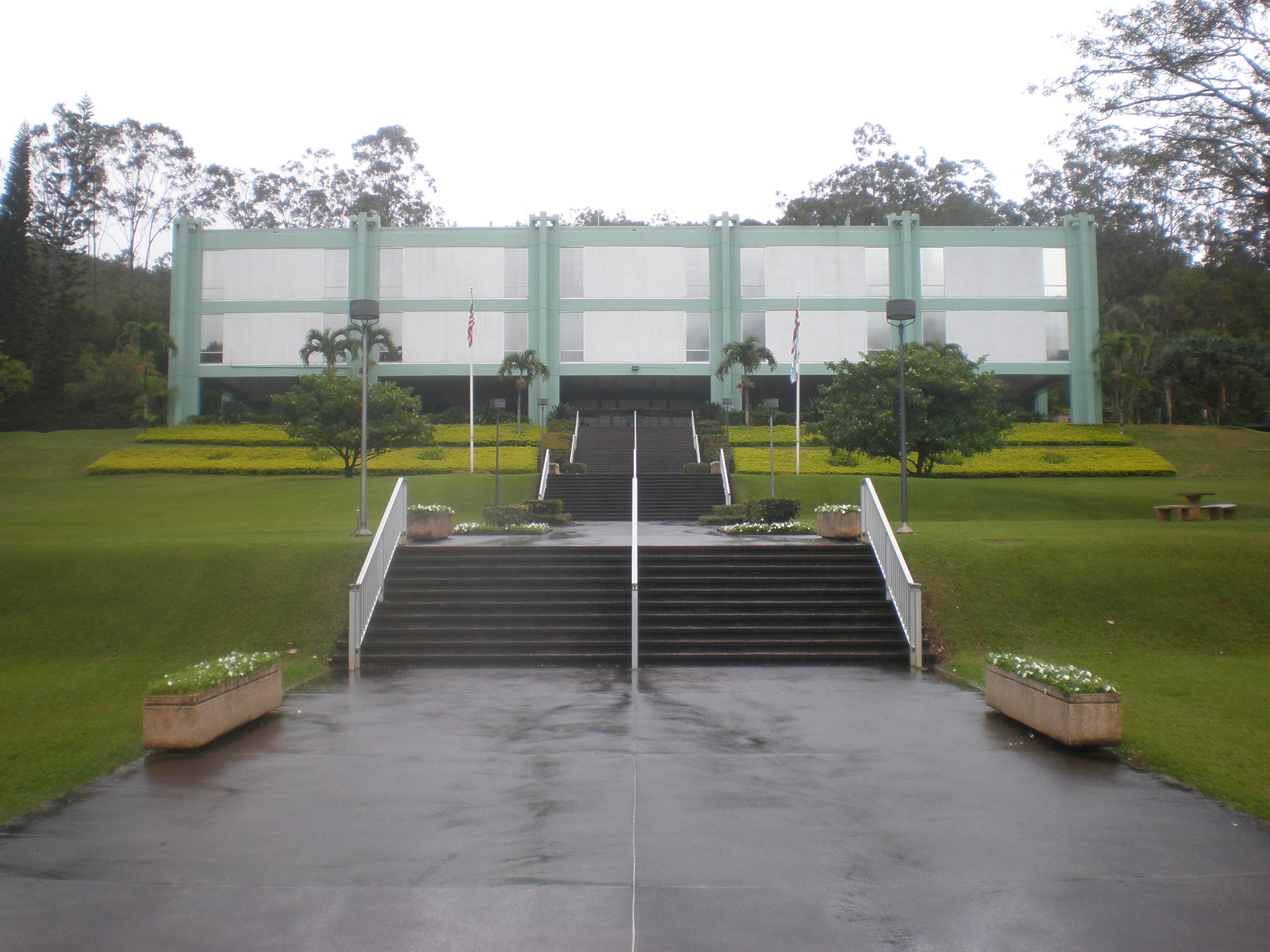
Former Hawaii Loa College main building

=== Hawaii Loa Campus ===
In summer 2024, HPU closed the Hawaii Loa campus, commonly called HLC. It is eight miles from the downtown campus, near Castle Junction in Kāneʻohe, on the windward side of the Koʻolau Range. HLC was originally built by Hawaii Loa College. The campus housed the natural sciences, nursing, public health, and social work programs. The name "Hawaii Loa" refers to the Polynesian navigator Hawaiiloa, who is credited in folklore with the discovery of the islands. In 2017, HPU sold the property to Castle Medical Center, but it continued to lease the space until 2024.

=== Military programs ===
HPU's Military Campus Programs (MCP) operates full-service campuses on Oʻahu's US military bases, including Pearl Harbor, Hickam Air Force Base, Tripler Army Medical Center, Camp H. M. Smith, Schofield Barracks, and Kaneohe Marine Corps Base Hawaii.

== Academics ==
Hawaiʻi Pacific University is made up of the following colleges: the College of Business, College of Liberal Arts, Graduate College of Health Sciences, College of Natural and Computational Sciences, School of Nursing, and the College of Professional Studies. HPU offers both undergraduate and graduate programs in each of its colleges and schools.

The university has extensive distance learning and online platforms for many of its programs. It also has an extensive Study Abroad and Student Exchange Program.

The student-to-faculty ratio is 15 to 1.

HPU is accredited by the WASC Senior College and University Commission. The School of Education is accredited for its B.Ed. and M.Ed. degree programs by the Council for the Accreditation of Educator Preparation. The Nursing Program's BSN and MSN degrees are approved by the Hawaiʻi Board of Nursing and accredited by the Commission on Collegiate Nursing Education. The Social Work Program's BSW and MSW degrees are accredited by the Council on Social Work Education.

== Athletics ==
The university's athletic teams are the Sharks. They compete in the Pacific West Conference as part of the National Collegiate Athletic Association's Division II. Hawaiʻi Pacific University's first venture into intercollegiate athletics came with the formation of the men's basketball team. The university previously competed in the National Association of Intercollegiate Athletics before joining the NCAA in the mid-1990s.

== Notable alumni ==
- Benny Agbayani, professional baseball player
- Kiwi Camara, defense lawyer
- Lymaraina D'Souza, Miss India 1998
- Tulsi Gabbard, 8th Director of National Intelligence, former United States Representative for Hawaii's 2nd congressional district
- Radasha Hoʻohuli, Miss Hawaii USA 2006
- Jeff Hubbard, professional bodyboarder
- Christopher Loeak, President, Republic of the Marshall Islands
- Saige Martin, artist and politician, first openly gay and Latinx person to serve on the Raleigh City Council
- James D. McCaffrey, software engineer and author
- Sarah Palin (attended), politician, attended one semester in 1982 at Hawaii Pacific College
- Gavin Petersen, college basketball coach
- Chad Rowan, also known as Akebono (Taro), sumo Grand Champion Yokozuna and professional and K-1 wrestler, played varsity basketball for HPU
- Carolyn Sapp, Miss America 1992
- Francyne Wase-Jacklick, Secretary of Health and Human Services for the Republic of the Marshall Islands
- Anna Watson (attended), fitness model and athletic trainer
- Eun Ji Won, member of the former K-pop band Sechs Kies
- Vivian Wu, actress
