= Anna Watson (cheerleader) =

American fitness trainer and collegiate cheerleader

- Born: Fayetteville, Georgia, U.S.
- Education: Hawaii Pacific University; University of Georgia
- Occupations: fitness model, fitness trainer
- Height: 5 ft 10 in (178 cm)

Anna Munzenmaier (née Watson) is an American fitness trainer and fitness model. She was a cheerleader at Hawaii Pacific University before transferring to cheer for the Georgia Bulldogs at the University of Georgia. During her time at Georgia, she was referred to in the media as the "World's Strongest Cheerleader", due to her physique. She was offered a contract with Elite Model Management but turned it down, reportedly because it required steroid use. Since 2023, she has worked as a fitness trainer.

== Early life ==
Watson is from Fayetteville, Georgia. She started training in gymnastics when she was five years old, and started cheerleading in her sophomore year of high school.

== Collegiate career ==
Watson began weight-lifting while a student at Hawaii Pacific University, where she was a cheerleader. Watson could squat 255 lbs, dead lift 230, curl 35 in each hand, and bench press 155 pounds. She later transferred to the University of Georgia and was a cheerleader there. During her time on the cheer team at Georgia, Watson received international media coverage due to her physique and was referred to as the "World's Strongest Cheerleader".

== Career ==
Watson was reportedly offered a $75,000 contract from Elite Model Management to serve as a fitness model, but declined because the agency would require her to take legal steroids to enhance her muscle size. She shared with Robin Roberts on Good Morning America and reporters from Inside Edition that taking steroids would be against her religious and personal beliefs, even though she was later accused by certain tabloids and talk show hosts of taking steroids to enhance her performance.

In 2023, she was hired as a strength training coach at D1 Training in Athens, Georgia.
