= New England Institute of Technology =

Private university in East Greenwich, Rhode Island, US

Coordinates: 41°39′42″N 71°30′10″W

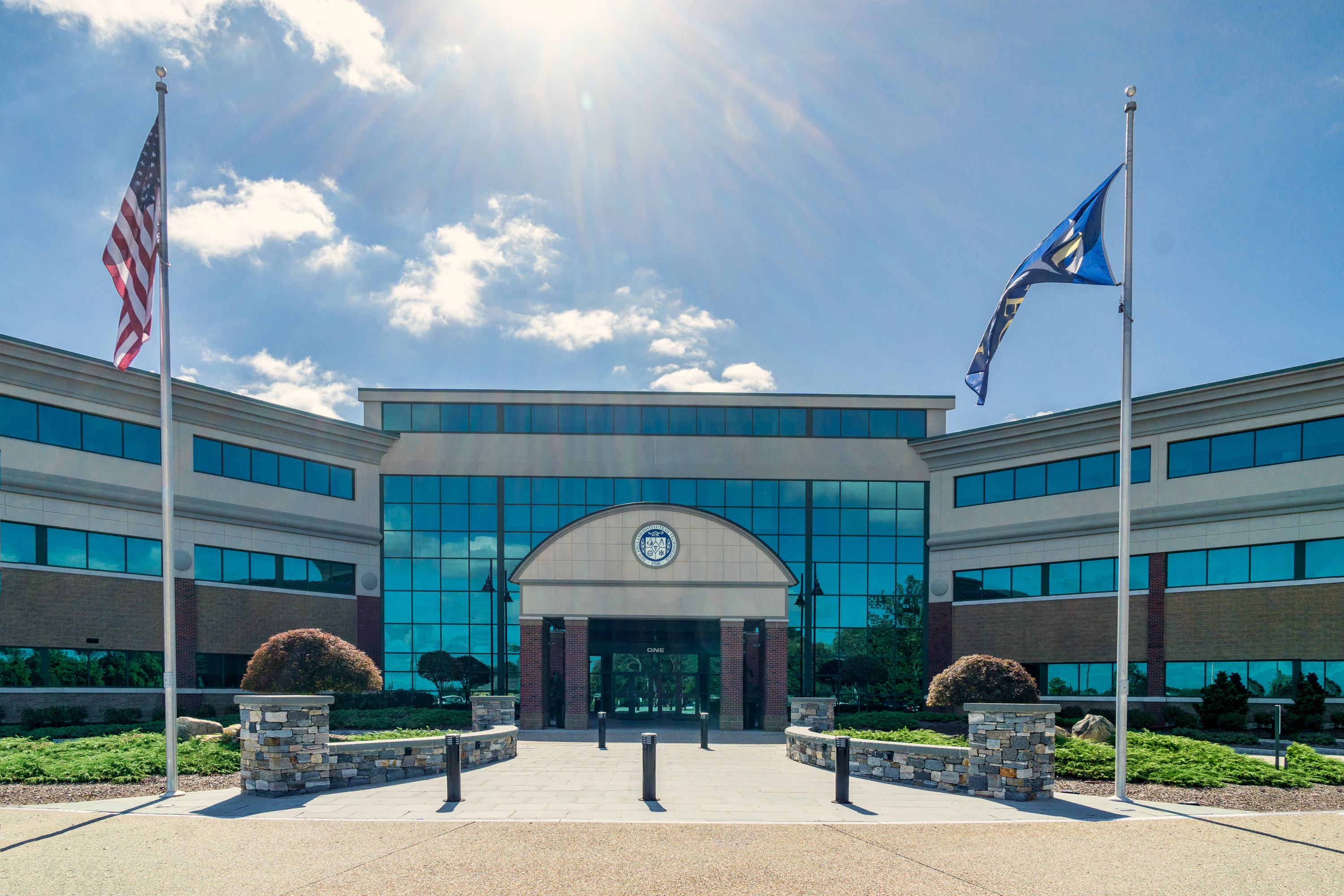
- Main Campus in East Greenwich
- Other name: NEIT
- Type: Private university
- Established: 1940; 86 years ago
- President: Richard I. Gouse
- Academic staff: 105 full-time
- Students: 1,850 (fall 2023)
- Undergraduates: 1,712 (fall 2023)
- Postgraduates: 138 (fall 2023)
- Location: East Greenwich, Rhode Island, United States
- Mascot: Tech Tigers
- Website: www.neit.edu
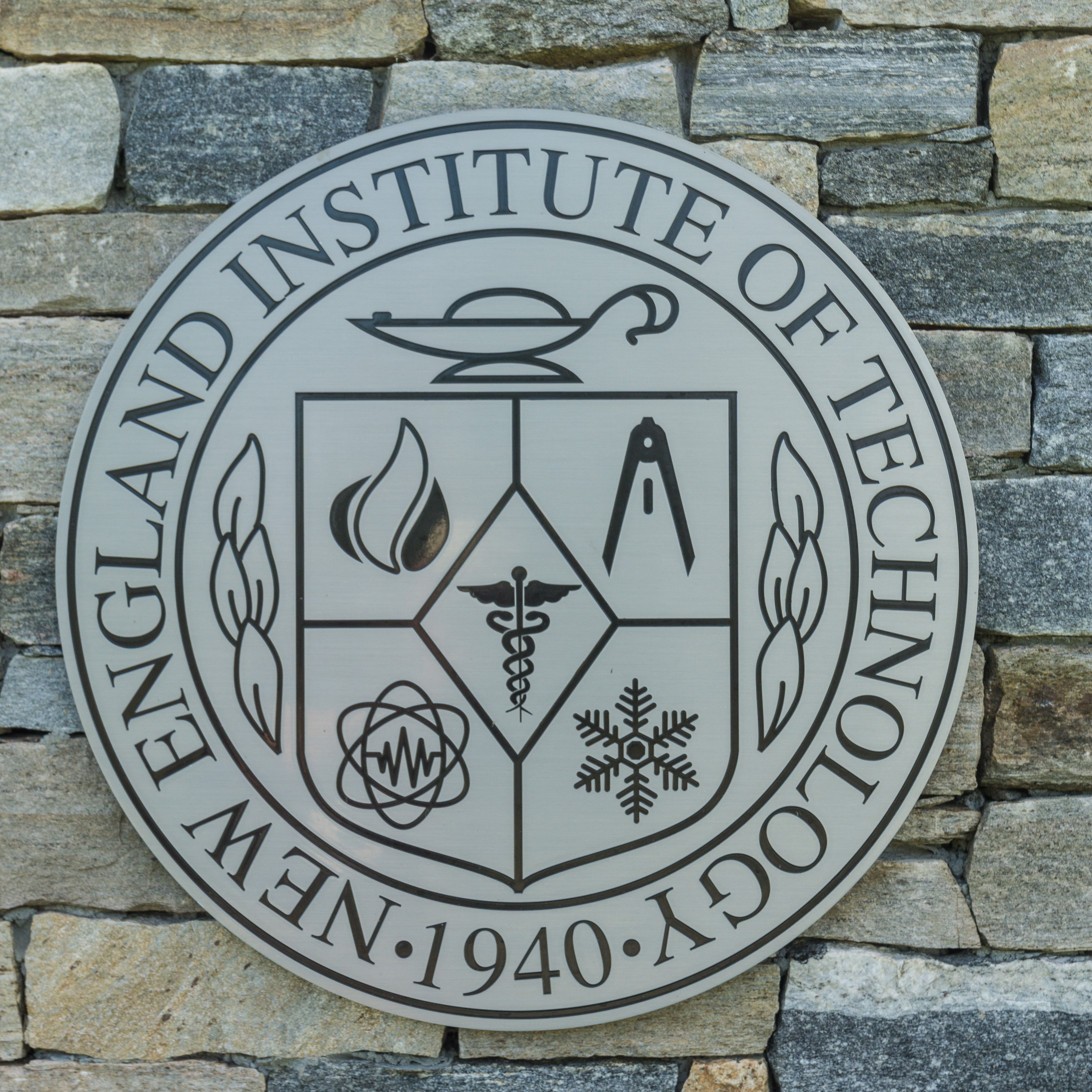

New England Institute of Technology (New England Tech or NEIT) is a private university with its main campus in East Greenwich, Rhode Island, United States. It was established in 1940 and Richard I. Gouse has been the president since 1971.

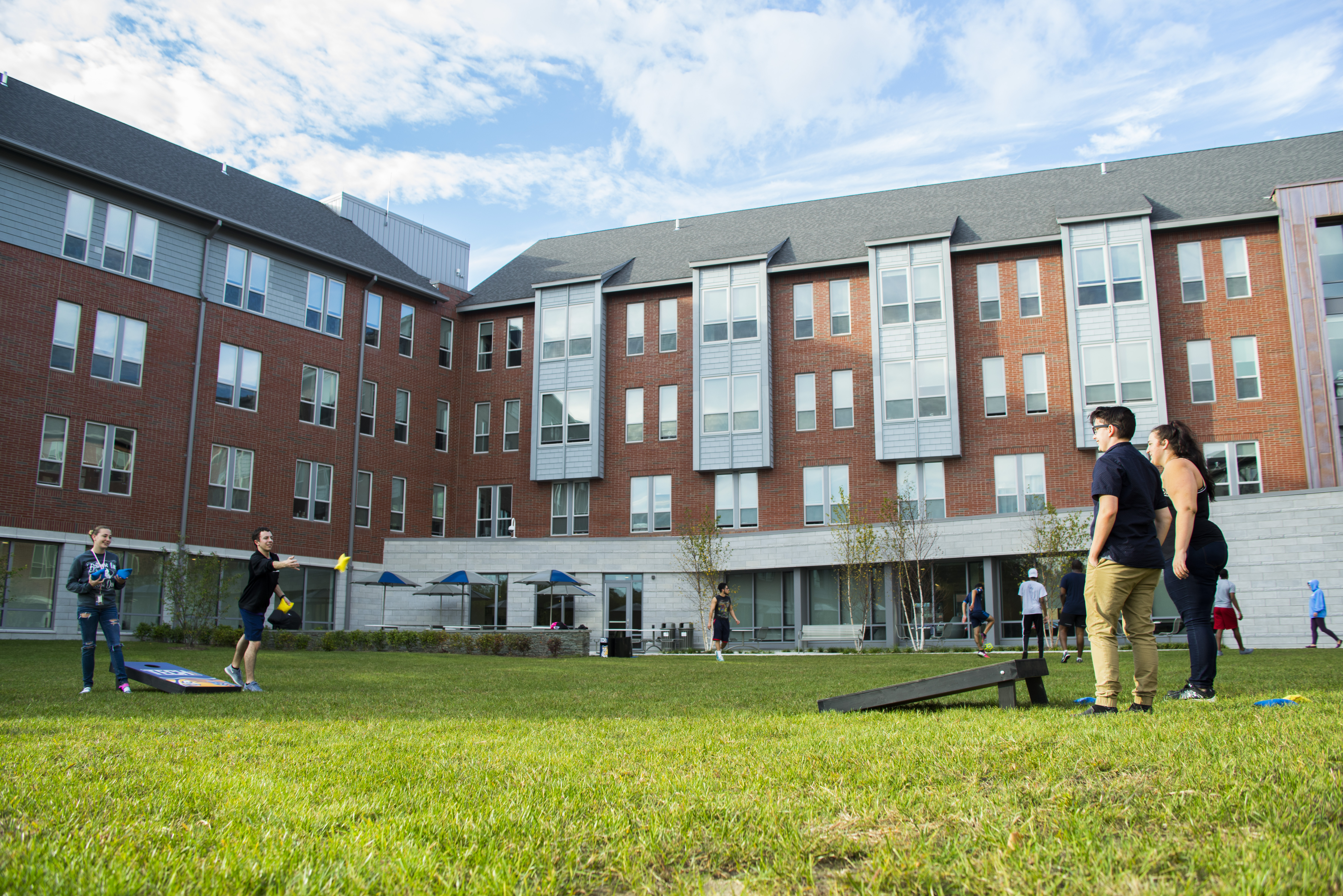

== Campuses ==
New England Tech's main campus is located on One New England Tech Blvd, East Greenwich with two smaller campuses located in Warwick.

=== East Greenwich Campus ===
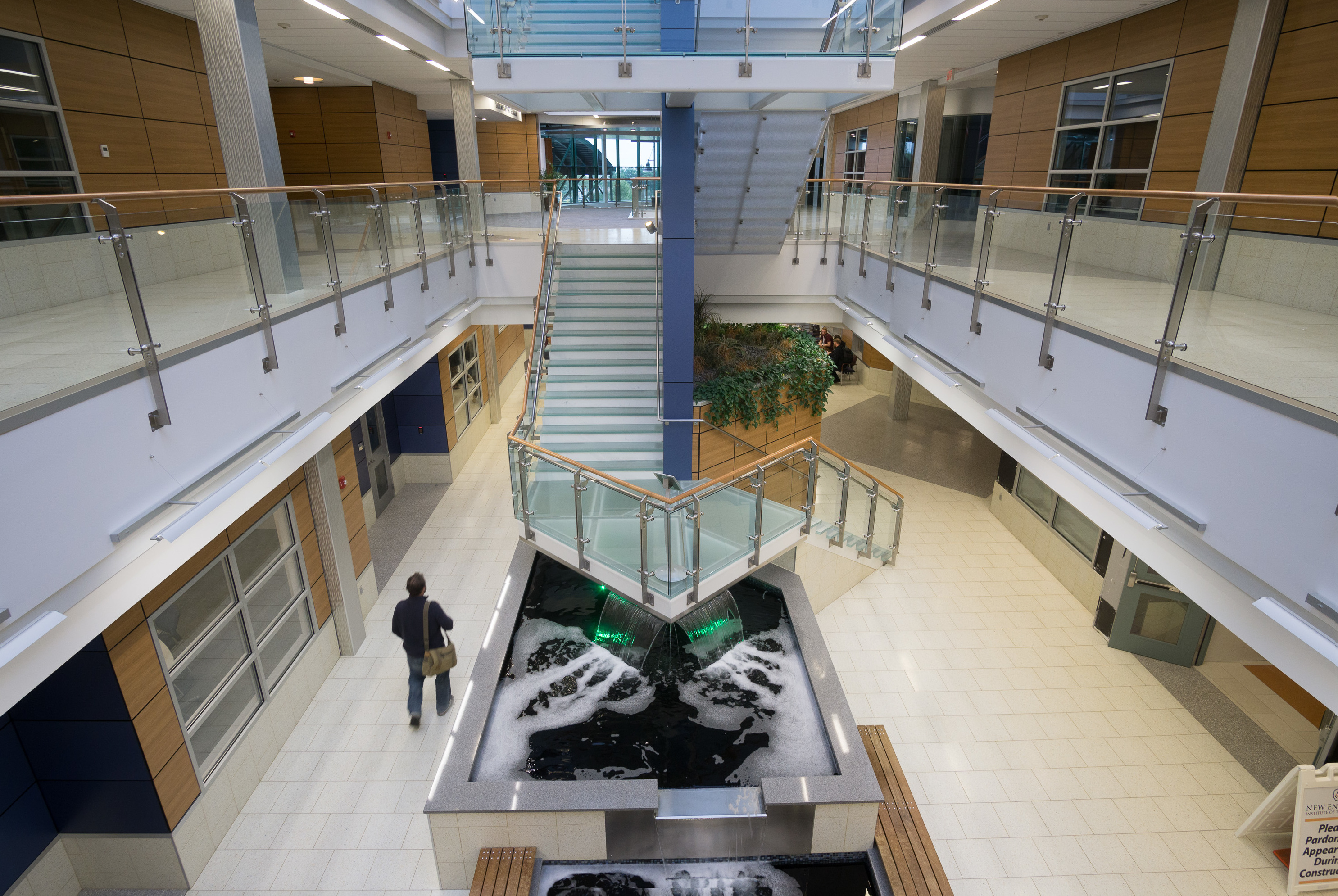
Atrium and waterfalls in the East Greenwich campus.

The East Greenwich Campus is the main campus for all administrative, residence, athletics, and student services. The campus's centerpiece is a newly renovated 265,000-square-foot (24,600 m^{2}) facility dedicated to classrooms, technical labs, medical suites for training simulations, and administrative services. The interior features technical labs and an open atrium with multi-tiered waterfall. A 400-bed residence hall is also located on the East Greenwich campus.

The building had been intended to serve as headquarters for the Eckerd Corporation. The site was purchased in 2007 still unfinished, and extensively customized for New England Tech. It opened to students in summer 2011; a major expansion begun in 2014 added dormitories and new instructional space.

=== Julian B. Gouse Campus ===
The Julian B. Gouse Campus is a 57,000-square-foot (5,300 m^{2}) facility containing classroom and laboratory space located on Post Road in Warwick, Rhode Island.

=== Access Road campus ===
The Access Road Campus consists of four buildings, including an automotive technician school which opened in 2005.

== Academics ==
The university is accredited by the New England Commission of Higher Education. It offers degrees in various technical areas, including plumbing and heating ventilation, architectural design, nursing, occupational therapy, veterinary technology, business management, criminal justice and software engineering, shipbuilding and advanced manufacturing.

=== National Alternative Fuels Training Consortium ===
The National Alternative Fuels Training Consortium (or NAFTC) has a training center located at NEIT.
