= Philip Pumerantz =

American educator (1932 - 2017)

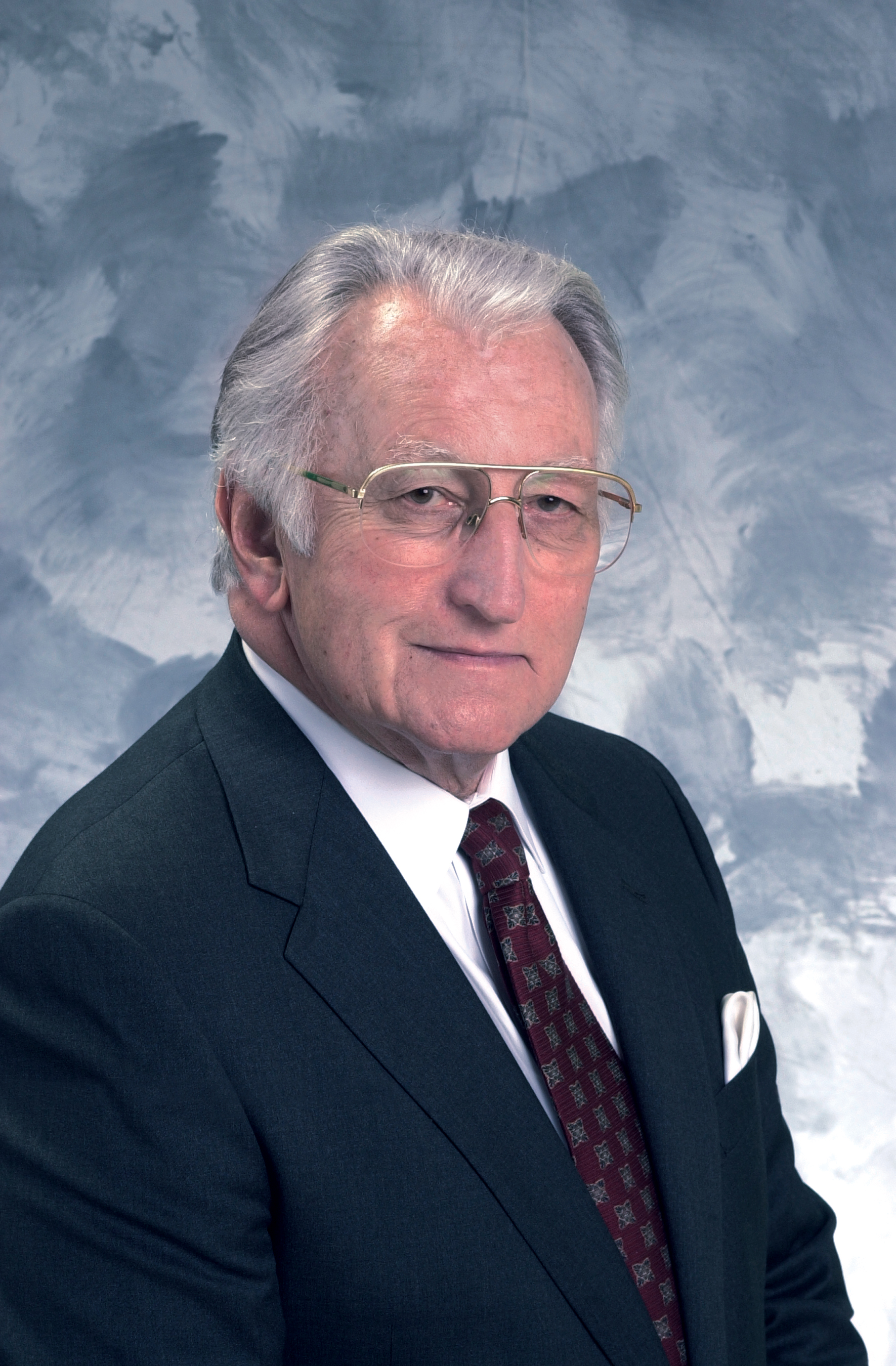
Philip Pumerantz, PhD

Philip Pumerantz (November 3, 1932 - December 26, 2017), was an American educator and college administrator who was the founding president of Western University of Health Sciences (WesternU) in Pomona, California. When he retired in September 2015, he was one of the longest-serving university presidents in American history.

== Life and education ==
Pumerantz was born on November 3, 1932, in New London, Connecticut, to Harry and Pauline Pumerantz. He attended New London and Hartford, Connecticut, schools and graduated from Bulkeley School. After graduation, Pumerantz enlisted in the US Army, where he was assigned to military patrol duty at bases in West Germany. After two years of army service, he enrolled at the University of Connecticut, eventually earning bachelor's and master's degrees in history and education.

Beginning in 1959, Pumerantz taught history at Waterford High School in Waterford, Connecticut, where he also had corollary duties in administration and served as a supervising teacher for student teachers from the University of Connecticut and Central Connecticut State College).

In September 1963, Pumerantz was named assistant principal at Tomlinson Junior High School in Fairfield, Connecticut. In 1967, he obtained his PhD in education from the University of Connecticut. Pumerantz then joined the faculty of the University of Bridgeport School of Education, and co-founded UB's College of Continuing Education. After a few years as an educational consultant, during which time he and a colleague established a college in Puerto Rico that became Caribbean University, Pumerantz became the director of education for the American Osteopathic Association (AOA) in Chicago.

== Career ==
In the mid-1970s, Pumerantz was contacted by a small group of osteopathic physicians in California who wanted to establish an osteopathic medical school there. Pumerantz, though officially behind the idea in his AOA role, didn't think a new osteopathic school was feasible. "There was just too much lined up against it, and too many people who said it couldn't be done," he remembered. However, many of the prominent osteopathic physicians in California (including Richard Eby, Ethan Allen, and Viola Fryman), finally convinced Pumerantz to lead the effort to establish a school."I had a list of reasons why it wouldn’t work, but when I started to think about it later, I realized a list of obstacles really was a plan to starting such a school," Pumerantz recalled. "You just needed to find a way around the obstacles."

In September 1977, Pumerantz became the president of the new College of Osteopathic Medicine of the Pacific (COMP), located in a largely abandoned shopping mall in downtown Pomona. COMP's first class of 36 students was admitted in October 1978. The College later acquired the former JC Penney building in the mall for division into classrooms, offices and an anatomy lab.

=== Growth into WesternU ===
In 1982, 31 students graduated as Doctors of Osteopathic Medicine from COMP. In 1996, Pumerantz oversaw the restructuring of COMP into Western University of Health Sciences.

Under Pumerantz, the university grew to 3,900 students in nine different colleges with over 12,500 health sciences alumni. WesternU had also grown to more than 1,100 staff and faculty, making it the fourth-largest employer in the Pomona Valley.

Pumerantz distilled his philosophy into this concept: "The discipline of learning. The art of caring."

== Awards and honors ==
The Chronicle of Higher Education has named WesternU one of its "Great Colleges to Work For" each year since 2012, with the 2014-16 recognitions including addition to the Chronicle Honor Roll as an institution with five or more areas of employment excellence. Pumerantz himself was the recipient of numerous awards, including the 1995 Distinguished Alumni Award from the University of Connecticut, the 1995 Dale Dodson Award for national leadership from the American Association of Colleges of Osteopathic Medicine, and the 2010 Distinguished Educator Award from the Boy Scouts of America. In 2011, he was selected to receive the prestigious Ellis Island Medal of Honor, and in 2013 was given the Northwest Osteopathic Medical Foundation's Founders Award for Exceptional Accomplishment. He was listed in Who's Who in the East, Who's Who in the West, Who's Who in California, Who's Who in America, the Directory of International Biography, and in Outstanding Educators.

== Retirement ==
Pumerantz retired from WesternU in September 2015. He transitioned to President Emeritus of the university, where he continued to work part-time until his death in 2017.
