= Chatt G. Wright =

Chatt G. Wright (born September 17, 1941) is a former president of Hawaii Pacific University. He was one of the longest serving presidents of a private university. He joined what was then Hawaii Pacific College on September 17, 1972, as the Dean of Business, then became President of the college on September 17, 1976. He retired in June 2011.
