= Financial gerontology =

Financial gerontology is a multidisciplinary field of study encompassing both academic and professional education that integrates research on aging and human development with the concerns of finance and business. Following from its roots in social gerontology, financial gerontology is not simply the study of old people but emphasizes the multiple processes of aging. In particular, research and teaching in financial gerontology draws upon four kinds of aging or "four lenses" through which aging and finance can be viewed: population aging, individual aging, family aging, and generational aging.

Demographic concepts, issues, and data play a substantial role in understanding the dynamics of financial gerontology. For example, through the lens of population aging, demography identifies the number of persons of different ages in cities and countries—and at multiple points in time. Through the lens of individual aging, demography also notes changes in the length of time—number of years lived in older age, typically measured by increases in life expectancy. From its founding years at the beginning of the 21st century, one primary interest of Financial Gerontology has been baby boomers and their relationships with their parents.

The impact of these two kinds of aging on finance is reasonably apparent. The large and increasing number of older persons in a society, no matter how "old age" is defined, and the longer each of these persons lives, the greater the impact on a society's pattern of retirement, public and private pension systems, health, health care, and the personal and societal financing of health care. The focus on boomers also illustrates the other two lenses or "kinds" of aging. How boomers deal with the social, emotional, and financial aspects of their parents' aging is a central aspect of family aging. And how boomers may differ from their parents, born and raised twenty to forty years earlier, and from their Generation X and Millennial children and grandchildren, is a substantial aspect of generational aging.

== Origins of financial gerontology ==
=== Establishment of the field of study ===
Financial gerontology originated in the work of two business professionals, Joseph Boettner, an insurance salesman and entrepreneur, and Davis Gregg, a business educator and administrator. Boettner was born in 1903 and left West Philadelphia High School to work in the city's insurance industry. He purchased the Philadelphia Life Insurance Company for $1 per share and reestablished operations. Boettner's post-high school education was with the American College of Life Underwriters, then an insurance education program within the University of Pennsylvania's Wharton School of Business & Finance; he earned his Chartered Life Underwriter (CLU) designation in 1934. Born in 1918, Gregg graduated from the University of Texas and earned his PhD from the University of Pennsylvania in 1947, where he studied under professor Solomon Huebner, the founder of the American College of Life Underwriters and considered by many to be the "father of insurance education". Gregg was on the faculty of Stanford University when Huebner asked him to come to the insurance college in Philadelphia for a short time. The "short time" became four decades, including thirty years (1954 to 1983) as the college's president.

Boettner made several investments in higher education, including endowing academic chairs primarily in the realm of life insurance programs. Although he was financially secure, he became increasingly concerned about how the average person can deal with aging and how educational programs could be created to respond to the needs and concerns of aging persons. Over the years Gregg's intellectual experience as dean and president encouraged him to expand the college's distance education curriculum beyond the CLU designation, which focused substantially on life insurance. Under his leadership the college developed a second professional designation, the Chartered Financial Consultant (ChFC), whose approach included financial planning courses beyond life insurance.

By the 1980s Boettner's concerns about personal aging and financial education began to merge with Gregg's views on the need for more comprehensive professional education in the expanding field of financial services. A result of these joint concerns was the plan for a new research institute that would focus on the interconnections between social gerontology and personal finance. With funding from Boettner, Gregg convened a study committee of gerontologists that agreed on four organizing principles: (1) that there was a need for specialized research that integrates gerontology and financial planning; (2) that a social gerontology research center could succeed at a small specialized business school; (3) that the permanent director of the institute should be an experienced gerontologist because the financial side of the relationship would be provided by the business school's faculty; and (4) that the new institute would communicate gerontological concerns to financial professionals and financial concerns to gerontologists.

=== The Boettner Institute of Financial Gerontology ===
On July 4, 1986, American College established the Boettner Research Institute under Gregg's supervision. Its first permanent director was Neal E. Cutler, a professor of political science and gerontology, recruited in 1989 from the University of Southern California's Andrus Gerontology Center. As models, there were several gerontological interdisciplinary sub-fields, including biological gerontology, social gerontology, occupational gerontology, and recreational gerontology; and the phrase "financial gerontology" was starting to be seen in professional publications. Consequently, in 1990 "Boettner Institute of Financial Gerontology" was chosen as the official name in order to create new sub-fields in both gerontology and in finance, and to describe and communicate the institute's scope of academic and professional education and research.

In 1992 the Boettner Institute of Financial Gerontology became chartered as a nonprofit charitable educational corporation with an independently appointed board of trustees of business and gerontology academics and practitioners. The same year, the trustees voted to move the institute from The American College and accept an invitation to become affiliated with the University of Pennsylvania School of Arts & Sciences. The Boettner Institute organized a series of published lectures given by experts in the "two sides" of Financial Gerontology. The inaugural lecture was given in 1997 by George L. Maddox, Director of the Duke University Center for the Study of Aging and Human Development: "Age and Well-Being." Other lectures included: William C. Greenough, CEO of TIAA-CREF and developer of the variable-annuity stock fund: "Critical Policy Issues for Pensions" (1989). Matilda White Riley, Director of the Office of Social and Behavioral Science, National Institute of Aging: "Aging in the Twenty-first Century" (1990). Davis W. Gregg, Founding Director of the Boettner Institute: "The Human Wealth Span: A Life Span View of Financial Well-Being" (1992). James E. Birren, psychologist and founding director of the USC Andrus Gerontology Center: "Information and Consumer Decisions-Making: Maintaining Resources and Independence" (1994). Dallas L. Salisbury, CEO of the Employee Benefit Research Institute: "Recent Trends in Pensions, Benefits, and Retirement: In-House Research" (1995).

In keeping with its established academic naming practices, the University of Pennsylvania renamed the Institute the Boettner Center of Financial Gerontology. In 2003 the Center was moved into the university's Wharton School as the Boettner Center for Pensions and Retirement Research affiliated with the business school's Pension Research Council, under the direction of Olivia S. Mitchell. The Wharton School holds one of two Boettner-funded endowed chairs in Financial Gerontology.

== Financial gerontology as academic teaching and research ==
=== The human wealth span ===
Early Financial Gerontology research focused on the interaction of (and longitudinal trends in) middle-aging and older-aging, and their combined impact on savings, retirement, health care, and long-term care. Research on aging and money often juxtaposes old age with the adequacy of financial resources (pensions, Social Security, and a variety of savings and investment approaches, often referred to as the "three-legged stool") to support the quality of personal and family later life. The integration of middle age as an essential dimension of Financial Gerontology reflected Gregg's and Cutler's conceptualization of the "Human Wealth Span" introduced in 1991–1992. As Gregg noted in his 1992 Boettner Lecture, the Human Wealth Span "mirrors" the better known Human Life Span concept which speaks not only to patterns of maturation and aging, but also to identifiable stages in human development.

An additional link in the etiology of the Wealth Span is the emphasis on the Health Span in Rowe and Kahn's concept of successful aging, especially the connection between health span stages, health behavior and, thereby, "successful aging." In terms of stages, it is apparent that health behavior choices made earlier affect health status and outcomes later in life. Rowe and Kahn emphasize that while it is better to start early and always have good health behaviors, starting later life can affect and improve health. For example, both cessation of smoking or "pumping iron" in one's 60s or 70s can have beneficial effects. Drawing on these insights, the wealth span representation of the life span in financial terms emphasizes two stages: the accumulation stage and the expenditure stage, which are somewhat correlated with developmental-maturational stages. Traditionally, people accumulate wealth in their younger and middle-aged years, and spend that wealth in their later retirement years. As Modigliani's life-cycle saving-spending hypothesis illustrates, this is a simplification of a complex life span dynamic; many people continue to accumulate in their older years just as younger and middle-aged persons spend during the accumulation years of their wealth span.

==== Changes in balance ====
The wealth span model offers two tools of analysis useful for both academic research and financial practice: (1) changes in the balance between the accumulation stage and the expenditure stage, and (2) increases in the complexity of each of the two stages. Balance here refers to the number of years in each of the two stages. The usual assumption for financial planning and financial well-being in later life is that the accumulation years provide the wealth for the expenditure years. Basically (but more complex in real life) the event or act of retirement is the behavioral fulcrum that conceptually divides an individual's wealth span into the accumulation years and the expenditure years.

Since the 1950s most Americans have stay in school (high school, college, graduate school) longer than earlier generations, many of whom left school earlier to work, thereby reducing the number of years in accumulation stage. The number of accumulation years is also reduced due to early retirement. However, patterns of retirement in the U.S. have shifted, with the strong preference for early retirement seen during the second half of the 20th century now easing as increasing numbers of older workers remain in or return to the labor force.

Across the twentieth century, life expectancy has increased substantially resulting in a longer expenditure stage. From the perspective of Financial Gerontology, such a shift means that people have fewer years to accumulate and what has been accumulated must last for a longer number of expenditure years. While it is unlikely that life expectancy will dramatically decline to shorten the expenditure stage, social policy and individual choice do influence the number of years in both the accumulation and expenditure stages. The wealth span model simply provides context, identifies the components, and directs attention to the dynamic interaction between them.

==== Changes in complexity ====
During the same decades in which the balance between the two stages has been changing, the complexity within both the accumulation and expenditure stages also has been increasing. The improvements in life expectancy in the United States have increased the complexity of the wealth span, both accumulation opportunities and expenditure responsibilities, in health care and health care finance, pensions and retirement finance, and family-financial behaviors. First, the more direct impact of greater longevity on finance focuses on health—including both investing in personal health behaviors that anticipate health issues, and the financing of health care in later life. In the U.S. this includes an accumulation stage planning focus on insurance, involving private health care insurance, Medicare, and the emergence of long-term care and long-term care insurance. With rising societal and individual health care costs, both the accumulation stage and expenditure stage of the wealth span have become more complex.

A second source of complexity is the substantial changes in the U.S. pension or "retirement income" system. In addition to the Social Security system, which provides some basic retirement income for almost all workers, 46% of all private sector workers also have an employer-sponsored pension. The increasing wealth span complexity, however, is found in the dramatic change in the kind of pensions held by American workers: Defined Benefit (DB plans) vs. Defined Contribution (DC plans) pension plans. While the discussion of these types of pensions is discussed in detail elsewhere, it is the fundamental difference in what is "defined"—that is, what is "guaranteed" to the worker in the expenditure stage—that produces the substantial increases in complexity. Conceptually, DB plans define the number of dollars the worker will receive after retirement. It is the employer who is responsible for contributing the necessary funds into the plan (sometimes with contributions from the employee). It is the "output" of pension money that is defined or guaranteed. By contrast, in DC plans, it is only the "input" of contributions into the pension plan that is defined or guaranteed in advance. In many DC plans the employee contributes a specified amount (or percentage) to his/her pension account and the employer matches the amount (in some cases only the employee or only the employer make the contributions). In all these cases, however, the later-life "output" of money to the retiree is based on how well, how successful, the contributed funds have been invested. The magnitude of changes in wealth span complexity precipitated by the shift from Defined Benefit to Defined Contribution plans is illustrated by the clarity of the shift from 1979 to 2013, documented by the U.S. Pension Benefit Guaranty Corporation and reported by the Employee Benefit Research Institute: in 1979 28% of private sector workers had a DB pension and only 7% had a DC pension (and 10% had both); by 2013, only 2% had a DB pension and 33% had a DC pension (and 11% had both).

Third, a separate but intertwined expenditure issue focuses on family aging—the degree to which longevity has changed the age structure of the family with substantial implications for the financial relationships between and among family members. When we say that "people are living longer" we are also saying that parents are living longer. The 1980s concept of the sandwich generation focused on forty-year-olds (usually women) simultaneously taking care of their 65-year-old parents and their babies and toddlers. Greater longevity is accompanied by the emergence, however, of the senior sandwich generation in which 60-year-olds are now the family generation in the middle taking care of (socially and financially) their 90-year-old parents alongside caring for their teenage and young-adult children. These demographically and financially new "senior sandwich" responsibilities of middle-agers can have substantial impact on their expenditure stage years, as they are now caring for elderly parents just as they are planning for and entering their own later life. Simultaneously, anticipation of these responsibilities can also add complexity to their accumulation stage planning. While the wealth span model is primarily an individual-level construct, financing health care and middle-age care for elderly parents are substantial issues of macro financial-social policy as well as of individual behavior.

Over the past century substantial changes in complexity have affected both the accumulation and expenditure stages of the wealth span. The increased complexity of the expenditure stage is dramatically evidenced by the fundamental demographic facts of increasing life expectancy which, at base, means spending over a longer number of years. Clearly the largest set of complexities precipitated by greater longevity are seen in older age health, cultural and scientific responses to health and aging, and of course the personal and societal financing of health care—including health care insurance. Medicare in particular, and the emergence of long-term care, illustrate the macro financial and political dimensions of the individual consequences of an evolving wealth span. Further exacerbating this complexity, senior sandwich generation responsibilities extend the personal financial impact of older-age longevity to the middle-age children of elderly parents. For example, In 1900 only 39 percent of persons age 50 had one surviving parent, rising to 80 percent by 2000. Further, in 1900 only 7 percent of 60-year-olds had even one parent alive, rising to 49 percent by 2000.

=== Endowed chairs in financial gerontology ===
Joseph E. Boettner, the successful high school educated insurance executive, directed a substantial portion of his wealth to higher education. His earlier gifts reflected his close involvement with the administration and finance of life insurance, especially as a central element in estate planning. With his support, in 1966 Temple University established The Joseph E. Boettner Chair of Risk Management and Insurance. The endowment currently supports not only a distinguished professorship but also scholarships for students seeking the MBA degree. Over the decades during which he worked with his colleague and great friend Davis Gregg (he called Gregg his "little brother") Boettner came to publicly recognize the importance of creating stronger linkages among life insurance, financial planning, and the science of gerontology. Together Boettner and Gregg also acknowledged that the emerging field of Financial Gerontology would develop best through both a research agenda (i.e., the Boettner Institute) and university programs that support both academic and professional education.

Since 1975 Boettner had been a Trustee of Widener University in Chester, Pennsylvania, outside Philadelphia. In addition to academic programs he supported development of the campus including a gift that produced Boettner Hall, an undergraduate apartment residence. It was agreed that the new Boettner Chair would be located at Widener. On October 29, 1993, Boettner's "little brother" (fifteen years his junior) died. Respecting Boettner's wishes the new Widener Chair was named the Boettner-Gregg Chair in Financial Gerontology. Also with Widener's support, in 1994 Neal Cutler, who had been Director of the Boettner Center at Penn, was named as the first holder of the Boettner-Gregg Chair. Joseph Boettner died on October 27, 1994.

The Chair at Widener continues as part of the School of Business Administration, currently known as the Boettner Endowed Professor in Financial Planning, held by Kenn B. Tacchino, a professor of taxation and financial planning. Since 1992 the Boettner Center of Financial Gerontology has been part of the Wharton School at the University of Pennsylvania. In addition to the Center the Boettner resources now support a Wharton professorship, first known as the Joseph E. and Ruth E. Boettner Professor of Financial Gerontology, and held by Beth Soldo, a demographer and sociologist who was also Director of the Boettner Center. It is currently known as the Boettner Professorship, held by Kent Smetters, a professor of business economics in the Wharton School Department of Business Economics and Public Policy.

=== Emerging literature of financial gerontology ===
One hallmark of the institutionalization of a new academic field or subfield is the development of "its own" literature. To be sure, there are countless publications in the academic disciplines of finance and gerontology that refer to money and aging. The four kinds of aging noted earlier—population aging, individual aging, family aging, and generational aging—each identify multiple linkages among aging processes, older men and women, money, and finance that are the focus of academic publications in their respective disciplines. The new field of Financial Gerontology emphasizes closer connections among the scholars, professionals, and writings of the separate fields. The intent, as well as the integration, travels in both directions: to expand the understanding of gerontology among financial professionals and to further illustrate the complexities of finance to gerontologists. This integration is well illustrated by an emerging literature of Financial Gerontology that has been developing over the last twenty-five years, including articles, books, and special issues of academic journals.

The 1992 volume, Aging, Money, and Life Satisfaction: Aspects of Financial Gerontology, a first publication of the Boettner Institute, includes an overview of new field plus the first series of annual Boettner Lectures (detailed above in the "Boettner Institute of Financial Gerontology" section). Of special note is the wealth span model discussed in Davis Gregg's demonstration of how the concepts of life span and health span lead directly to an understanding of financial well-being in later life. The wealth span concept is drawn from Nobel prize-winning economist Franco Modigliani's life cycle saving-spending hypothesis and became a continuing aspect of the Boettner Institute's research and teaching, as noted earlier.

A major contribution to the development of the literature of Financial Gerontology was the publication in 1996 of the Encyclopedia of Financial Gerontology edited by Lois Vitt and Jurg Siegenthaler. The one-volume publication includes over 150 authors each providing a two- to five-page article on a subject relevant to one of eight core topics: Economic and Income Security; Employment, Work, and Retirement; Family and Intergenerational Issues; Financial Advice, Investments, and Consumer Services; Health Care and Health Insurance; Housing and Housing Finance; Legal Issues and Services; Quality of Life and Well-Being. As an encyclopedia, the organization is of course alphabetical, ranging literally from Accelerated Death Benefits to Zoning. To enhance pedagogical value to educators, however, each of the 150+ articles is listed under one of the eight core topics at the front of the volume. To enhance value to researchers, each article includes a short bibliography plus a number of "see also" references to other articles in the collection. Finally, given the broad multidisciplinary nature of the developing field of Financial Gerontology, including the non-standardization of several disciplinary vocabularies, the encyclopedia includes a massively detailed 40-page index in which such subjects as "assets," "consumer protection," or "employment" are included in multiple articles.

In 2003, an expanded edition of the encyclopedia was published under the title Encyclopedia of Retirement and Finance edited by Lois Vitt. The number of authors, articles, and core topics were all increased, resulting in a substantial two-volume encyclopedia. While a core purpose continued to be as a resource for researchers and teachers, the new edition signals the growth of Financial Gerontology as a component of professional education. [See "Financial Gerontology as Professional Education" below.] As Vitt writes in the Preface: "My experience in consumer financial education during the past several years led to this revised edition, which has been expanded to include many additional topics about preretirement and retirement issues. Included in the new edition are entries that span the array of employer sponsored health and retirement benefits, which are increasingly central to working Americans and to their partners and family members. There is a great need for this financial knowledge to reach the many professionals who advise, support, sell products to, serve, assist, and teach mid-life and later-life clients."

In 2002 the J.K. LasserPro division of Wiley published the first textbook in Financial Gerontology, under the title Advising Mature Clients: The New Science of Wealth Span Planning. The book builds on two of the key Financial Gerontology concepts mentioned earlier: (1) the wealth span, including its accumulation stage and expenditure stage, and (2) the four "lenses" or kinds of aging: individual aging, population aging, family aging, and generational aging. The wealth span concept builds on Rowe and Kahn's ideas of "health span" and successful aging. As Cutler notes, just as good health habits can start at any time but should start early in life, so too can good financial habits start any time but better begun early. Following a detailed review of the different "kinds" of aging the book focuses directly on the how changes in the stages of the wealth span affect individual financial attitudes and behavior. Chapter 5 focuses on the changing "balance" in years between the accumulation stage (fewer years due to personal preferences and public policies) favoring early retirement, and the expenditure stage (more years due to increasing longevity). Of perhaps greater significance (Chapter 6) are three interrelated dimensions of increasing complexity of the accumulation stage: (1) the trend toward multiple sources of later-life income which an individual or family is likely to have (e.g., an individual retirement account, an employer-based pension, Social Security, personal investments and savings, home equity); (2) the dramatic move from Defined Benefit pensions ("they are responsible for my future retirement income") to Defined Contribution pensions ("I am responsible for my future retirement income"); (3) increasing family-connected financial complexities (nowadays a 62-year-old is more likely than in prior decades to have one or more surviving 87-year-old parents).

The textbook also includes chapters on the multiple meanings of "middle" when talking about the financial psychology of middle age, as well as chapters on health insurance, long-term care, and reverse mortgages. Not surprisingly, much of the data and some of the issues surrounding, for example, Medicare (e.g., there was no Medicare Part D in 2002), Medicaid, long-term care insurance, and nursing home cost data, are out of date. Conversely, the key concepts surrounding the wealth span model (such as changes in the accumulation stage and the expenditure stage) remain relevant as the demographic, personal, and policy context of finance and aging becomes more complex. In this regard, speaking as much to undergraduates as to financial professionals, Chapter 1 identifies four Principles of Financial Gerontology that are relatively independent of the "current" state of aging and finance: (1) Gerontology is not the study of old people. (2) Financial decisions are family decisions. (3) Wealth Span interventions are better when made earlier but can work at any age. (4) The Wealth Span adviser, as a trusted family adviser, will be called upon to—and should be educationally equipped to—provide non-financial guidance. (p. 6).

In addition to the development of text and handbooks, the broader academic and interdisciplinary recognition of a new field or subfield is evidenced also by the publication of special topical issues of major disciplinary journals. The American Society on Aging [ASA] is one of the two major multidisciplinary membership organizations in the United States focusing on issues of aging. [The older, slightly larger organization is the Gerontological Society of America, founded in 1945, which has separate divisions for biological-medical science, behavioral sciences, and social practice.] Founded in 1954, the ASA's membership of 5,000 professionals includes educators and researchers alongside service providers, program administrators, business executives, policy makers, and students. Each issue of the ASA's widely-read journal, Generations, typically focuses on a single research or policy issue, offering a dozen or more articles plus bibliographical resources. The Summer 1997 issue of Generations (volume XXI, no. 2) was titled "Financial Dimensions of Aging." The twelve articles introduced the relatively new field of Financial Gerontology to a new audience of professionals. Subjects included the history of retirement security, economic diversity, boomers as young middle-agers compared to their parents at the same age (in 1997 boomers were only 33 to 51 years old), financial literacy, and an assessment of the Social Security crisis of the day.

The Winter 2004-05 issue of Generations (volume XXVII, no. 4), titled "Silver Industries," provided a more focused business and aging view of Financial Gerontology. Here the emphasis was on how specific industries and products are being developed in response to aging individuals and aging society. Introductory articles included a brief history of the evolving link between business and aging, generational differences in the psychology of the older consumer, and the marketing challenges in reaching older consumers. Most of the seventeen articles, however, focused on the relationship of aging to specific industries, including: the pharmaceutical industry, financial services, automobiles, moving services, venture capital, and the personal digital assistant (forerunner of today's smartphones). The Silver Industries construct continues to be an important dimension of Financial Gerontology, including for example,The Silver Market Phenomenon: Marketing and Innovation in the Aging Society

== Financial gerontology as professional education ==
=== Bimonthly financial gerontology column ===
The Journal of Financial Service Professionals, established in 1946, published bimonthly, is the official journal of the Society of Financial Service Professionals. The Society, established in 1927, was the de facto alumni association of the American College of Life Underwriters (known currently as The American College of Financial Services) whose primary insurance education designations are the Chartered Life Underwriter (CLU) and more recently the Chartered Financial Consultant (ChFC). Hence, the original name of the journal was the Journal of the American Society of CLU and ChFC. In addition to longer articles submitted on a range of financial, legal, and administrative topics, each issue of the journal includes several continuing "Departments." These bimonthly research and professional practice reviews and tutorials include such continuing topics as Accounting & Taxation, Social Security Planning, Ethics, Practice Management, Estate Planning, Technology, Health Insurance, Risk Management, and Advice for the New Planner. In the November 1990 issue of the Journal of the American Society of CLU and ChFC, President-Emeritus of the American College of Life Underwriters, Davis W. Gregg, introduced a new continuing column ("Department") titled "Financial Gerontology" with his essay on the Human Wealth Span.

The first "permanent" author of the column was Neal E. Cutler, the recently installed Director of the Boettner Institute of Financial Gerontology (described earlier). His first column was also published in the November 1990 issue of the journal, alongside Gregg's introduction. Cutler authored the column for a quarter-century (bimonthly through 1997 and every other bimonthly column through March 2016). During these years, guest authors and co-authors included Harry R. ("Rick") Moody, Director of Academic Affairs at the AARP; Janice I. Wassel, Director of The Gerontology Program at the University of North Carolina at Greensboro; Robert C. Atchley, Director of the Scripps Gerontology Center at the Miami University of Ohio; and Steven J. Devlin, a former vice-provost at Lehigh University.

The second permanent author of the Financial Gerontology column, sharing the bimonthly writing with Cutler beginning in 1997, was and is Sandra Timmermann. Timmermann is a gerontologist who focuses on educational outreach especially in the areas of business, care-giving, long-term care, and adult housing. A recipient of the American Society on Aging's Cavanagh Award for Excellence in Education and Training, Timmermann was Executive Director of the MetLife Mature Market Institute from 1997 to 2013. She is currently Adjunct Professor of Gerontology at the American College of Financial Services. Following Cutler's "retirement" from the column, John N. Migliaccio was selected by the Journal as the third permanent author of "Financial Gerontology" sharing the bimonthly schedule with Timmermann. Migliaccio is President of Maturing Mark Services company, a planning and research consultancy working with financial and social services companies and agencies. He is adjunct faculty in the DePaul University Asset-Based Community Development Institute, was one of the founders of the American Institute of Financial Gerontology, and previously was Director of Research at the MetLife Mature Market Institute.

==== Multiple columns, multiple topics ====
The orientation of the "gerontology column" in the Journal of Financial Service Professionals mirrors the basic mission of Financial Gerontology itself: to introduce, teach, illustrate, document, and explain the concepts, issues, data, and experiences of gerontology to professionals in the fields of finance and business. Since 1990, the range of topics and titles collectively reflects what could be seen as a full introductory university course in gerontology offered to the financial services professional (albeit without formal exams and credits). Some of the columns have been "data heavy," including: “The Older Population and Rising National Health Care Costs: A Case of the ‘Compositional Fallacy’?” (January 1993); “Pension Complexity, the Middle Class, and Financial Professionals: New Evidence from the 2001 Survey of Consumer Finances" (November 2003); “Generational Demographics, Gerontology, and Finance: Size Matters, but the Story is More Complex” (July 2009); “How Everybody’s Consumer Opinions Interact with the Gross Domestic Product: A Brief Look at the Index of Consumer Sentiment” (July 2013); “The Twenty-first Century ‘Dependency Ratio’—Older People vs. Older Workers” (November 2013); “The Democratization of Financial Gerontology" (March 2014).

One of the foundational concepts of Financial Gerontology is that gerontology is not the study of "old people" but is the study of the multiple processes of aging. A corollary (and conundrum) of this concept is that age differences among individuals and groups of people may not be the result of aging. An alternative explanation, a "rival hypothesis" to maturational-developmental aging, is the generational explanation. In many areas of human attitudes and behavior—financial, social, political, personal—the differences between younger and older people may be caused not by their aging but by their generation, their birth cohort, their personal exposure to a slice of history when they were growing up. Given the direct relevance to financial practitioners of untangling the maturation (aging) vs. generation (cohort) interpretations of financial behavior, a number of Financial Gerontology columns over the years focused on this generational cluster of issues, including: “Communicating With Worried Older Clients: The Impact of ‘Generational Diversity’ ” (May 1992); “Too Much Money for Retirement: Are There Generational Differences?” (November 2005); “Financial Planning for the ‘Senior Sandwich’ Generation,” (March 2006); “Current Trends in Pension Participation: The Impact of Age, Cohort, and Enrollment Practices” (July 2006); “Prospective Age vs. Chronological Age: Why 60 Really is the New 40” (March 2010).

Other columns focus more directly on the family and care-giving issues that financial professionals encounter when dealing with "older" men and women (including middle-aged persons); for example: “Personal Care, Home Care, and Long-Term Care Insurance" (November 1991); “Caring For Elderly Parents: Where Do You Look For Help? [Why Does a Financial Planner Need to Know About Geriatric Care?]” (July 1994); “The Financial Services Advisor as a Geriatric Medical Consultant" (July 2002); “Live Long and Prosper: The Challenges of Longevity Planning" (November 2008); "Life Planning and Retirement Planning: Where Do They Intersect?" (January 2016); "Planning for the Utterly Unexpected: Advice for the Financial Planner" (November 2017).

Not surprisingly, the main focus of Financial Gerontology columns is on connections among aging and money. Even as the services being sold are primarily financial, in dealing with aging men and women alongside their middle-aging family, the financial professional is often asked for non-financial advice. Questions about long-term care, senior housing, estate and longevity planning often requires expertise beyond just financial choices and specifics. Sometimes the questions are quasi-emergencies, about a parent's possible memory issues, driving, where and when to move out of a large house. The experience of many financial professionals is that understanding such non-financial issues, having a supply of information and referral, helps to build a relationship of empathy, trust, and expertise. Several of the columns illustrate how the financial professional can at times act as a kind of geriatric consultant to their clients, including: “Alzheimer's Disease as 'Normal Aging'-- Retirement Planning and the New Longevity” (November 1993); Caring For Elderly Parents: Where Do You Look For Help? [Why Does a Financial Planner Need to Know About Geriatric Care?]” (July 1994); “Geriatric Assisted Living: When Mom and Dad Can’t Live Alone Anymore” (March 1996); “The Financial Services Advisor as a Geriatric Medical Consultant" (July 2002); “The Financial Professional’s Role in Comprehensive Geriatric Assessment” (March 2005).

And where every Financial Gerontology column embodies a serious educational purpose, several have had a more whimsical flavor, including: “Sex, Asset Accumulation, and Rock’n’Roll: Introducing Retirement Planning to Teenagers and Other Pre-Middle-Agers" (November 1992); “Hair Spray and Life Insurance: Capitalizing on the Baby Boom's Diversity" (May 1993); “Successful Aging, Willard Scott, and Dental Floss" (March 2002); “Nanatechnology: The Financial Gerontologist as Technology Consultant” (July 2008); “Nostalgia as a Financial Variable” (March 2011); "Tombstones" (July 2015); "Millennials and Finance: The Amazon Generation" (November 2015).

=== American Institute of Financial Gerontology ===
The idea for a formal educational program in Financial Gerontology emerged starting around 1999 from the experience of two gerontology researchers-teachers, Neal Cutler and John Migliaccio. At the time Cutler was a professor of gerontology and Migliaccio was president of a gerontology marketing and consulting firm. The work of each focused on a financial view of gerontology and a gerontological view of finance. Over the years they had been invited to give presentations (sometimes together, sometimes individually) on gerontology to meetings and organizations of financial professionals. The increasing number of these invited presentations suggested to them the need within the financial services profession for a more structured and recurring educational program. As noted in the discussion of the Boettner Institute, the basic model was not to teach finance but to introduce, explain, illustrate, the value of gerontology to professionals already providing financial services to clients. This general educational goal was strengthened by the fact that the clientele of an increasing number of financial professionals included not only younger clients who were now elders, but also the middle-aged families of those now-elder clients.

Working with a small number of colleagues in both the financial services industry and academic gerontology, they drafted a curriculum of core courses and electives, examined alternative educational formats, identified potential faculty, and evaluated the likely success of a new educational program in a financial industry already populated with dozens of courses, certificates, and continuing education alternatives. The view of each of these elements was judged to be positive, and the American Institute of Financial Gerontology (AIFG) was incorporated in 2002. The educational structure of AIFG follows the general model of professional education. It offers a range of specialized courses, including both required and elective courses followed by a monitored written examination, culminating in a named designation. AIFG chose a "traditional" educational model of in-person courses and examinations; the explosion of online education was just beginning. Each course was a four-hour lecture-discussion seminar. Completion of the program included four required Core courses and two Electives (described below) selected from an expanding list of elective topics and courses. Like the traditional courses, the comprehensive final examination was also done in-person in a monitored context. AIFG's designation was conferred upon successful completion of the six courses and exam. Given the number of certifications in the finance industry, the initial name of the designation was "Certified Financial Gerontologist" (CFG). In addition to other reasons for this name, the rationale was also that financial professionals would see the parallel between the CFG and the well-established Certified Financial Planner (CFG) designation. Financial Gerontology would be seen as an additional specialization that some professionals would add to their education and training. As it turned out, however, the parallelism of CFG and CFP was perceived by some as more confusing that helpful. Consequently, after two years of courses and awarded designations, as the newer and smaller program AIFG changed its designation to the Registered Financial Gerontologist (RFG).

==== Students and prerequisites ====
The RFG vs. CFP relationship is important to the AIFG story in another fundamental way: identifying students eligible to enroll in the program. A basic premise of Financial Gerontology education is that it teaches gerontology to financial professionals. Thus, from its earliest conception AIFG required a demonstrable financial educational background as the prerequisite to enrollment in the RFG program. During the first five years of the program, most RFG students were those who had previously earned the CFP—or similar financial planning certifications (e.g., the ChFC, Chartered Financial Consultant). In this structured way the AIFG curriculum was not intended to compete with other basic financial educational programs, but to be an extended, specialized educational experience. Some of the AIFG students described it as a "boutique" kind of focused education. In recent years, as the program grew nationally, about a third of AIFG students came from other finance-related occupations, including lawyers, accountants, stock brokers, retirement advisers, social services administrators, and even some financial journalists. While not required, virtually all AIFG students had a college degree although not necessarily in finance, economics, or business. Rather, the key enrollment prerequisite was professional practitioner experience in financial services.

==== AIFG core courses and electives ====
Core Courses. AIFG courses, both core and electives, are "traditional" in-class face-to-face seminar classes (typically 20-25 students). Each course is scheduled as a four-hour class. Each student takes the four Core courses plus two Electives. To minimize the amount of travel and time that full-time financial professionals would spend out of office, the curriculum was offered and organized into a mid-to-late-week schedule: two four-hour Core courses on a Wednesday, the second two Core courses on Thursday, two Electives (selected from four available at any given session) on Friday, and the comprehensive examination on Saturday morning.

AIFG 101. The introductory course, "The New Science of Wealth Span Planning", introduces the Wealth Span model of individual-level financial planning, with a focus on the four "kinds" or four "lenses" of aging described earlier: population aging, individual aging, family aging, and generational aging. In introducing the Wealth Span model, the course focuses on the historical changes from the 19th to the 21st Century in the balance between and the changes within the Accumulation Stage and Expenditure Stage of the Wealth Span. AIFG 101 also introduces the student to different ways of understanding national (and international) population dynamics that demonstrate the gerontological demographics influencing individuals, families, social policies, and their combined impact on financial issues. For example, population pyramids are used to illustrate changes, 1950 to 2050, in the fundamental age structure of the United States, the contours of which illustrate the "morphing" of a triangular profile into an oval population profile.

AIFG 102. The second Core course, "Basic Processes of Aging: Physical, Psychological, and Social", builds on the core concept that gerontology is not the study of "old people" but embodies a central focus on the multiple processes of aging. Students see the progression of aging and maturation from the perspectives of biology, psychology, and sociology. The course examines also how the maturational stages of the life course affect overall life planning which in turn directly influence how individual and family financial decisions are made in the crucial areas of employment and retirement. In keeping with the multidisciplinary nature of gerontology in general, this course is regularly taught by a professor of sociology who directs a university gerontology program and who is also a faculty member in a medical school.

AIFG 103. The third Core course, "Serving the Older Client: Values, Ethics, and Lifespan Development", moves into the realm of ethics and legal aspects of client-oriented financial practice. Part of the course elaborates the procedural nuts and bolts of serving and protecting the interests of older persons, e.g., guardianships, conservatorships, powers of attorney, trusts. More critically, the course focuses on the ethical (which can become legal) challenges in the context of older clients, e.g., client decisional capacity and surrogate decision-making. In many cases the key question becomes "who is the client?" For example, when the son (and heir) brings his 80-year-old father to the son's financial planner in order to "review" the father's pattern of investing and spending, who really is the professional's client? In this way the course introduces some of the ideas offered in the Family Aging Elective (AIFG 105). The course was initially developed by a professor of ethics and philosophy and later taught by attorneys one of whom is a past president of the National Academy of Elder Law Attorneys.

AIFG 104. The fourth Core course, "Financing Longevity", returns to the linkages between gerontology and finance. While much financial practice focuses on how individuals establish and accumulate their financial resources, a primary interest of most older clients is protecting and spending their wealth with an eye to their own and their family's future needs. In the 21st Century, further, financial practice is taking place as men and women are spending more time in their older years. Part of the course introduces the basics of pensions, Social Security, and Medicare as key elements of financial resources in older age; in this way, the course also introduces the AIFG Long-term Care (AIFG 107) and Medicare (AIFG 110) electives. A critical component of the course, however, is taking a dynamic look at how different forms of investment, risk, and expenditures change over the life course, over the wealth span. How should Tom and Mary's financial plan at age 55 be different from their plan at age 35 (and when their children are toddlers vs. their now 30-year-old "kids")? This course has been taught only by faculty who have (at least) the Certified Financial Planner (CFP) designation.

Electives. In addition to these four Core courses each student is required to complete two Electives (also offered as four-hour in-person seminar style classes). Over the years, six Electives were rotated through the curriculum.

AIFG 105. Family Aging. The central premise of the "families and money" Elective, "Families and Aging: Resources for Professionals" is that "financial decisions are family decisions." As the population ages, so do individual members of the family. As with other elements of gerontology, this implies that it is not just the parents (and grandparents) who are older than was the case in prior decades. In the context of Family Aging, the care-providing children are also older than was the case decades ago. These family aging dynamics have produced an extension of the concept of the "sandwich" generation into the more contemporary reality of the "senior sandwich" generation in which the "60-year-old kids" are the generation in the middle, taking care of (financially and personally) their 90-year-old parents (while also providing financial assistance to their own adult children). AIFG 105 is offered at every AIFG session; it has become "almost" a Core course in that the vast majority of students elect to take it.

AIFG 106. Aging Network. The "Aging Network and the Long-Term Care Service Delivery System" Elective focuses on two care-provider aging-oriented networks within which professionals should work in providing financial counseling and services to their clients. The "formal" network of over local 600 Area Agencies on Aging (AAA) are part of the local-state-federal network created since the 1970s by the Older Americans Act of 1965 (OAA). Much of the work of the AAAs is aimed at identifying services and local agencies that will increase the capacity to elderly and frail persons to age in place in their own home, rather than moving into nursing homes—which clearly has financial as well as social consequences for elders and their family. Since relatively few financial professionals are aware of this aging network and the various social, nutrition, and health services the local AAAs provide, AIFG 105 was developed to provide the connection. In addition to this formal network, AIFG also introduces the larger network of organizations, agencies, and programs with which the financial professional can partner to offer clients a variety of assistance. This Elective is offered in about half of AIFG sessions.

AIFG 107. Long-term Care Solutions. Long-term care institutions and services, with an emphasis on the complexity of financing and especially long-term care insurance, has been a high priority concern of financial planners and their clients. "Long-term Care Solutions" offers a comprehensive overview of the subject. While a substantial part of long-term care financing is seen in individually-purchased long-term care insurance, a substantial proportion of older Americans believe they will pay for their long-term care, either services or nursing home residence, from Medicare. While Medicare's primary function is health insurance, under some circumstances it does pay for some long-term services. Further, Medicaid does pay for nursing home services under some circumstances. Both of these "under some circumstances" make the financial planning for long-term complex, for both client and the adviser, including the "complexity" of misunderstanding of "Medicare" vs. "Medicaid" vs. "medigap" by both professionals and the public. AIFG 107 is a very popular Elective and is offered at almost every AIFG session.

AIFG 108. Financial Preparedness. The overarching theme of the "Financial Preparedness for Later Life" Elective is that while most financial planners have substantial knowledge of and experience with strategies for investment and wealth accumulation (especially in dealing with relatively younger clients), traditional understanding of the tools and techniques of later-life spending, risk, and family dynamics is lacking. Dealing with the already-made "fixed" results of previously made choices concerning pensions, investments, and Social Security is only a first step. In discussing individual and family strategies for expanding wealth in later life as well as protecting the already accumulated assets, AIFG 108 examines such approaches as portfolio theory and probability theory, including techniques for managing several kinds of financial risk in the context of multiple and tiered time horizons especially relevant to older persons and their families, alongside the effects of inflation and taxes.

AIFG 109. Marketing. "Successful Marketing to the 50+ Population" is designed to serve the majority of AIFG students who are sole proprietors or partners in small businesses and thus are responsible for their own local marketing strategies. The course reviews marketing approaches of special relevance to older persons, including consumer values analysis, strategies for mature consumer segmentation, and current psychographic frameworks. Seen through the "lens" of Generational Aging, the course places special emphasis on the consumer characteristics of the major generational cohorts that define the 50+ age population, including Baby Boomers, "In-Betweeners," and Seniors. Further, looking through the "lens" of Family Aging, the course examines such strategies as "tangential marketing" through which, for example, marketing is aimed at middle-age-children purchasers for products to be "consumed" by their elder parents. This Elective is offered at almost every AIFG session.

AIFG 110. Medicare. One of the key links among aging, money, and retirement is concern with how to pay for health care. AIFG courses speak to this central Financial Gerontology issue in several ways, including: trends in Population Aging and Individual Aging (AIFG 101), physical and psychological aspects of aging (AIFG 102), allocation of resources across the life course (AIFG 104), middle-aged children's responsibilities for elder parents (AIFG 105), and the financing of long-term care (AIFG 107). Substantial Medicare changes were enacted in 2003 in the Medicare Modernization Act, especially its central policy and financial innovation, the Part D prescription drug benefit to subsidize the costs of prescription drugs and prescription drug insurance premiums for Medicare beneficiaries. In response to requests and advice from both prior and potential students, in collaboration with a health care attorney specializing in public programs, in 2006 AIFG created and offered AIFG 110, "Gerontology and the New Medicare." The course includes a detailed history of Medicare, including distinctions between Medicare and Medicaid; a review and analysis of Medicare Supplemental Insurance plans (usually referred to as "medigap" insurance) including standardization of plans, State variations, and the role of Managed Care; and, centrally, the processes, scope and limitations, and cost of the new Medicare Part D pharmaceutical benefits. This Elective is offered at every AIFG session.

==== Faculty profiles ====
Reflecting the field of financial gerontology itself, the AIFG faculty is highly multidisciplinary, including a range of both academic and professional disciplines. Over the years, twenty-two faculty have taught the AIFG courses described above. The faculty includes elder law attorneys, social workers, financial planners, accountants, insurance specialists, social service administrators, and university faculty. The AIFG faculty exhibits a fairly broad range of degrees and designations, including: PhD (7), CFP [plus ChFC, etc.] (5); JD (3), MBA (3), MSW (2), MHealth (2), CPA (1). Three of the four Core courses are taught exclusively by PhDs: New Science of Wealth Span Planning, Basic Processes of Aging, and Family Aging. The Ethics and Values course was developed and taught by a professor of ethics and currently taught only by elder law attorneys. The Marketing course has been taught by two faculty each of whom owns their own small aging-focused marketing firms. The Financing Longevity and Financial Preparedness courses were taught by finance specialists with MBA and CFP backgrounds. The Long-term Care Finance and Medicare courses are taught only by faculty with finance, law, or accounting backgrounds.

=== International financial gerontology ===
==== Korean Institute of Financial Gerontology ====
Of the hundreds of students who completed the AIFG's Registered Financial Gerontologist (RFG) program, one was a Korean banker and entrepreneur studying for his Master of Science degree in Gerontology at the University of North Carolina, Greensboro (UNCG). Joo Han, a successful Mergers and Acquisitions banker in South Korea who earlier earned his PhD in Accounting from City University of New York, was developing a second career focused on providing housing and social services to elders in Korea. During his MS-Gerontology studies he also enrolled in the AIFG program in 2008 which was offering the RFG curriculum at UNCG. Han saw the linking social and financial services education as similarly valuable for financial advisers in Korea, using the AIFG program as a model. Despite the obvious cultural and language differences between Korea and the U.S., alongside the somewhat-similar but different demographic and retirement profiles of the two countries, Han resolved to bring Financial Gerontology education and training to Korea. A partnership with AIFG was developed, and in June 2011 the Korean Institute of Financial Gerontology began offering its RFG curriculum.

Both Korea and the United States are experiencing substantial Population Aging, with increasingly large numbers and percentages of their populations living in older age. Both countries have retirement security policies that include both public and private pensions. Beyond such basic similarities, however, are substantial differences that speak directly to the need for advisers and clients who understand the concepts and details of Financial Gerontology. In the realm of population, for example, Korea is aging at a faster pace than the U.S. and is expected to reach the status of "hyper-aged" (e.g., % of the population over age 65; large numbers of centenarians) in 2026—compared to the U.S. in 2036. In this sense, given the impact of gerontological demographics upon financial practice, the need for Financial Gerontology education in Korea is substantial. On the matter of health care in older age, for example, although Korean citizens have the advantage of universal health care, the need for educated health-financial planning remains. In part this is due to recent patterns of health insurance. The National Health Insurance Act, enacted in 1977, initially focused on workers in large companies, later expanded to other employment sectors, reaching universal coverage by 1989. Further, health insurance itself was provided by hundreds of employment-sector based insurance societies, but merged into a single health care system by 2004.

The retirement income security policies in Korea are similar to the model of a three-legged stool or three-tier system that characterizes the U.S. and other countries. The first tier is the Basic Livelihood Security Program for all Korean citizens in poverty, functionally (if roughly) similar to the U.S. Supplemental Security Income (SSI) program. It is based on current income (welfare) rather than on age or past employment. The first tier also includes the National Basic Livelihood Security program which provides income to retired older persons; this program is based on both age and current income. The second tier is the National Pension Scheme (NPS) created in 1986. The NPS is a government guaranteed employment-based Defined Benefit pension plan, partially funded by the employee and employer who contribute equally (currently, 4.5% of gross income) to the plan. Coverage is fundamentally mandatory for persons employed in both private and public organizations. The third tier reflects individual investment and savings.

Embedded in this birds-eye view of the Korean income security system are several complexities that suggest the need for advisers trained in both finance and gerontology. Perhaps the largest area of complexity is the relative newness of pension policies and systems, especially considering the rapid economic development of the Korean economy in the past two decades alongside, as mentioned, the rapid aging of the Korean population. Created as a Defined Benefit pension system, the NPS includes official income replacement rates. The NPS soon recognized that due to rapid population and related factors, the fund was facing financial deficits. Consequently, first in 1998 and again in 2007, the replacement rates were lowered from 70% to 60% and then to 50%, with another reduction to 40% over the years 2009-2028. During these years, also as part of responding to an anticipated deficit, the full-benefits retirement age was raised from 60 to 65. Both confusion about benefits and distrust in the national pension system increased. An additional complication is that Korean pension benefits are often paid as lump sum annuities, placing even more responsibility on the retiree for balancing financial issues with older-age planning.

The sum of these and similar dynamics influenced Joo Han to partner with AIFG to establish the Korean Institute of Financial Gerontology (KIFG). The KIFG approach focuses on working with specific financial institutions—primarily banks, investment firms, and insurance companies—to provide education and training to their employees, compared to the AIFG focus on individual professionals as students in educational sessions held at academic and gerontology venues throughout the country. During its first years KIFG graduated about 100 students per year.

KIFG offers a five-day curriculum of required courses, reflecting 40 hours of coursework. Each day represents a Financial Gerontology theme. Day 1 is an introduction to Financial Gerontology, including an overview of the aging society, examination of Baby Boomer policies in Korea, and an examination of the multinational "Third Age" concept—roughly the time between retirement and disability when the older individual can focus on life fulfilling activities. Day 2 focuses on housing issues, including universal design and the development of age-friendly cities, older-age housing, long-term care services, and the role of nonprofit organizations in the housing arena. Included here also is the new "well-dying" law in Korea that recognizes the rights of terminally ill people to choose their own death and die with dignity. Day 3 is an experiential day in which the students, mostly financial professionals working in banks and insurance companies, visit senior centers, nursing homes, and other older age facilities. Day 4 focuses on the practicalities linking longevity and financial planning, including elder law, health care, and marketing to the 50+ population. Day 5 introduces concepts and issues of communicating with seniors, counselling psychology with seniors, and what is included in a "senior-friendly" business.

==== Financial gerontology in China ====
Following two years of discussion and negotiation, in 2017 a partnership was established between AIFG and a financial services company in the People's Republic of China to establish a Financial Gerontology program in China. Shanghai Jian Rui Investment & Management Ltd. (JR), based in Shanghai, is involved in investment and pension management. As in other developing countries, significant changes in public social security programs and private pension arrangements, alongside rapid Population Aging and Individual Aging, have created an emerging need for advisers and managers with knowledge and understanding of the dynamics of Financial Gerontology in China. To further these educational goals, JR has in turn partnered with the Chinese Academy of Social Sciences (CASS), described as the premier and the most comprehensive academic research organization in China for study in the fields of philosophy and social sciences. As initially conceived, the program in China will adapt and build upon the AIFG curriculum of four Core courses and selected Elective courses. The intent of the program is to offer the Registered Financial Gerontologist professional designation to qualified Chinese students. At the same time, individual courses and sets of courses will be made available to students not seeking to achieve a formal certification. Through a set of working groups involving JR, CASS, and AIFG, substantial adaptation is being made to reflect the current financial, demographic, and policy contours of the Chinese aging society. The inaugural Chinese Financial Gerontology courses are scheduled to be offered in the first quarter of 2018.

== See also ==
- Grey pound
- Silver economy
- Economics of ageing
