= Silver market =

Silver market may refer to:

- silver as an investment
- a Japanese name for the "silver economy", goods and services for old people.
- a commodity market dealing with silver.
