= George Nichols =

George Nichols may refer to:

- George Nichols (martyr) (c. 1550–1589), English Catholic martyr
- George Nichols (actor) (1864–1927), American actor and director
- George Nichols (Australian politician) (1809–1857), Australian politician
- George S. Nichols (1820–1916), American politician and Union Army officer
- George Nichols (American politician) (1827–1907), American physician, politician, and educator
- George Ward Nichols (1831–1885), American journalist
- George Nichols (cricketer) (1862–1911), Gloucestershire and Somerset first-class cricketer
- George Elwood Nichols (1882–1939), American botanist
- George Nichols (boxer) (1907–1986), light heavyweight boxer
- George Nichols III, American banker and insurance commissioner and executive

== See also ==
- George Nicholls (disambiguation)
- George Nicol (disambiguation)
