= Basic Old-Age Pension =

Part of the South Korean pension system

Ministry of Health and Welfare

Article 1 of the Basic Pension Act (Purpose)

The purpose of this Act is to support the stability of the life of the elderly and promote welfare by providing a stable income base by paying the basic pension to the elderly.

South Korea introduced its Basic Old-Age Pension in 2008 as part of its pension system. According to the Ministry of Health, Welfare and Family Affairs, the Basic Old-Age Pension is "designed to enhance welfare of the elderly by providing a monthly pension payment to the elderly in need." The pension was intended to benefit workers contributing to the National Pension Scheme.

By 2012, the pension was only covering 16% of the minimum cost of living, and benefited 67% of Korea's population over the age of 65. It was extended in 2014 to provide monthly allowances of approximately $179 (200,000 South Korean won - KRW) to people over the age of 65 in the bottom 70th percentile of income earned. In 2014, approximately 4.9 million people benefited from this program.

South Korea's old-age pension scheme provides lifetime cover for individuals aged 60 or older, provided they have fulfilled the minimum requirement of 20 years of contributions to the national pension scheme beforehand. Those who have made a minimum of 10 years of contributions and who have reached the age of 60 are eligible for cover under a "reduced old-age pension" scheme.

Additionally, there is an "active old-age pension" scheme, covering individuals aged 60 to 65 who are engaged in income-earning activities. Those aged between 55 and 60 who are not engaged in income-earning activities are eligible for the "early old-age pension" scheme. Around 60% of Koreans aged 65 and over are entitled to a benefit amounting to 5% of their past average income, receiving an average of KRW 90,000.

Basic old-age pension schemes cover individuals aged 65 and older who were earning below an amount set by presidential order. In 2010, that ceiling was KRW 700,00 for a single person and KRW 1,120,000 for a couple, equivalent to around $600.00 and $960.00 respectively.

== The financial resources ==
The state and local governments are supposed to pay together. The state provides differential support in consideration of the conditions of local governments (the proportion of the elderly population of local governments and financial conditions). Due to changes in the population structure, some responsibility for basic pension funds is likely to be a burden on local governments. This is because local governments, where the proportion of the elderly population is increasing, are likely to increase the burden on basic pensions while their own income will decrease. Since 2020, the ratio of government support has been raised for local governments with high levels of spending in the social welfare sector, but there are opinions that fundamental solutions are needed considering changes in the demographic structure of local governments in the future.

== History ==
The predecessors of the basic pension system, which has been introduced and operated since July 2014, include the old-age allowance system, the senior pension system, and the basic old-age pension system. The basic old-age pension is one of the national pensions, which was established by the Roh Moo Hyun Participating Government to improve the welfare and quality of life of the elderly, and is a monthly welfare benefit paid to the elderly over a certain age. The first proposer was Yoo Si-min, the Minister of Health and Welfare, but the name was changed to the basic old-age pension, and the basic old-age pension law was proposed by Kang Ki-jung of the Uri Party (currently the Democratic Party) on March 30, 2007 and passed the plenary session on April 2, 2007 and took effect on January 1, 2008.

=== The Government of Roh Moo Hyun ===
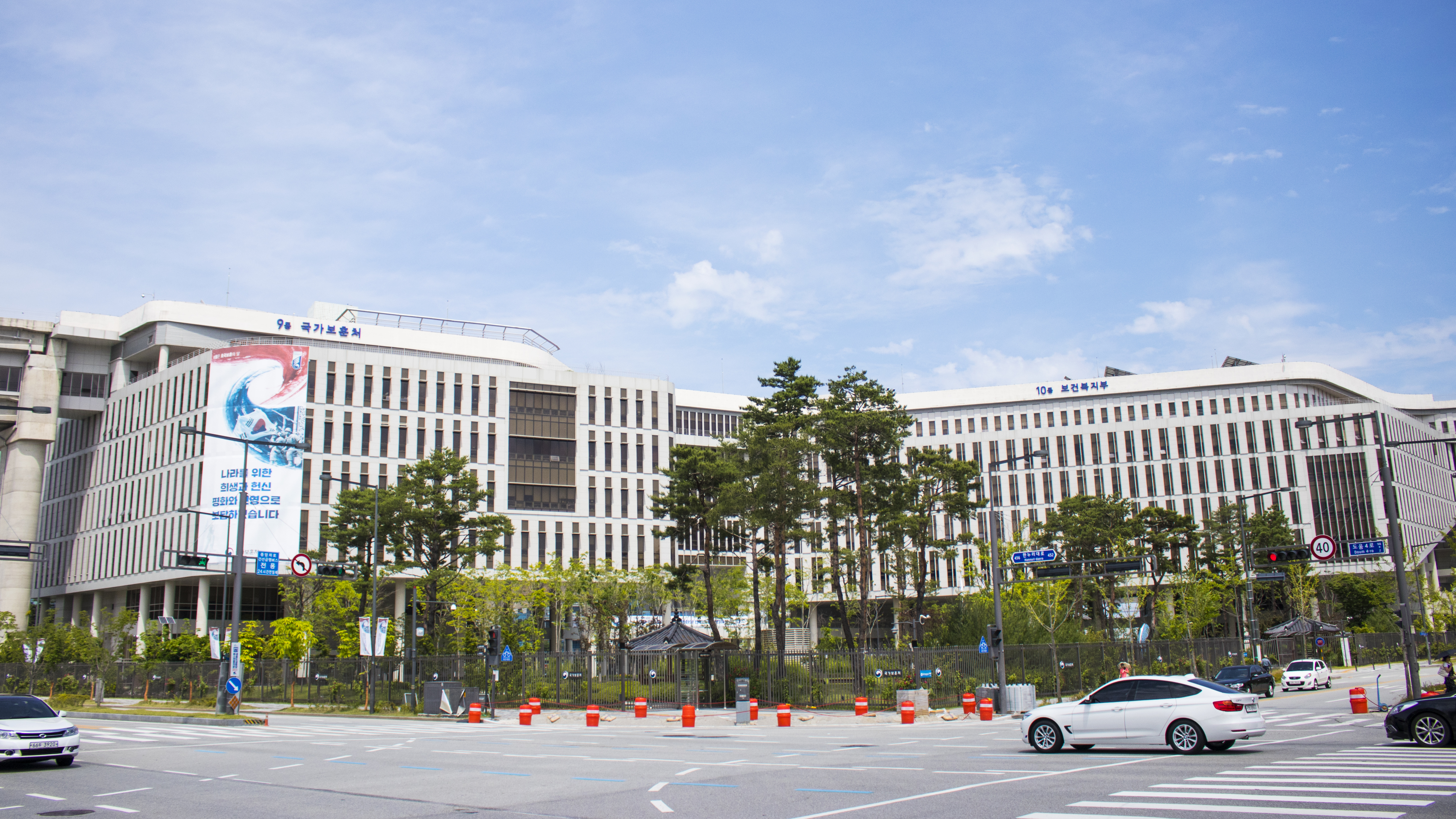
Ministry of Health and Welfare in Sejong-si

Act newly enacted on April 25, 2007 for the purpose of stabilizing the living and promoting welfare of the elderly. The effective date is 1 January 2008. The National Assembly's Health and Welfare Committee held a plenary session on the 7th and voted on the Basic Old Age Pension Act, which calls for paying pensions to senior citizens aged 65 or older from July 2008. Uri Party lawmakers, Democratic Party lawmakers Kim Hyo-seok and Democratic Labor Party lawmakers Hyun Ae-ja participated in the vote, with 11 out of 12 lawmakers in favor and one abstaining. The Basic Old Age Pension Act, proposed by Rep. Kang Ki-jung and revised by Rep. Yang Seung-jo, will pay pensions to senior citizens aged 70 or older from January 2008 and expand the scope of pensions to senior citizens aged 65 or older from July 2008. As a result, pensions for senior citizens aged 65 or older will be paid from 83,000 won to 90,000 won per month, and senior citizens' allowances of 35,000 won to 60,000 won currently paid to senior citizens will be abolished. Meanwhile, Rep. Ko Kyung-wha and others pointed out that the bill could be less than 60 percent, adding to the bill's supplementary provisions that the beneficiaries of the basic old-age pension should be 60 percent of the nation at the time of the system's implementation.

=== The Government of Park Geun Hye ===
In the 2012 presidential election, Saenuri Party candidate Park Geun Hye, who provided up to 94,000 won a month to the bottom 70 percent with low income and assets, pledged to pay 200,000 won a month to all senior citizens regardless of income and was elected with overwhelming support.

However, the government later promoted the basic pension system by targeting the low-income 70% elderly in consideration of the country's financial situation and relationship with the national pension, and changing the payment amount to be linked to the national pension. In conclusion, the basic old-age pension system, which has been in effect since January 2008, was drastically revised and implemented from early 2014, and it was linked to the National Pension Service to reduce the burden on future generations. It is a method of paying less if the pension receipt is large, and more if it is small.

Park Geun Hye The government has established a system that pays a certain amount of pension (200,000 won) per month to 70% of all senior citizens aged 65 or older who have low income and assets to help stabilize their lives.

At the time of the introduction of the system, the basic pension amount was set to increase reflecting prices every five years, but during the presidential election process in May 2017, discussions on raising the basic pension amount were held again. At that time, most candidates proposed a plan to raise the basic pension amount from 200,000 won per month to 300,000 won (what's the difference between 300,000 won, Ahn Cheol Soo, Hong Joon Pyo, Yoo Seung Min, Sim Sang Jung, and Moon Jae In?April 19, 2017, the Seoul Economy), the abolition of links with the National Pension Service, and adjustment of targets for supply and demand were also discussed. Moon Jae In In June 2017, after the government took office, the National Opportunity Committee announced a plan to raise the basic pension amount to 250,000 won from the first half of 2018 and to 300,000 won from 2021.# In July 2018, a plan to advance the support period was announced and implemented to support the difficulties of the low-income elderly at an early stage. In other words, it was raised to 250,000 won from September 2018, and the basic pension amount was preferentially raised to 300,000 won for the lower 20% of income in 2019 and the lower 40% of income in 2020. In addition, from 2021, a step-by-step increase plan was implemented to raise the salary to a maximum of 300,000 won for the lower 70% of income subject to the basic pension.

== Position ==
Korea's retirement income guarantee system has a multi-pillar system proposed by the World Bank and the OECD. In 1994, a report titled "Avoiding the Old-Age Crisis" published by the World Bank suggested a three-layer pension system. When preparing a significant amount of retirement funds as pensions, the pension guaranteed by society (jointly borne by the state, business, and individuals) was named as the first floor (1st Pillar: Management Pillar), the second floor (2nd Pillar: Mandatory Private Managed Pillar), and the third floor (3rd Pillar: Individual Pillar). Later in 2005, the World Bank published a report titled "Old age income support in the 21st century," in which the social security pension, which was classified as the first floor in the existing three-story pension system, was divided into basic and public pensions.

Currently, public pensions such as the national pension operated by social insurance are the basis of the retirement income guarantee system on the first floor, and there is a system to prepare additional retirement income through retirement pensions on the second floor and personal pensions on the third floor. In addition, on the 0th floor, the basic pension system and the basic living security system for supporting the low-income class are located as two pillars of public assistance.

== Scope ==
Article 3 of the Basic Pension Act (Scope of Basic Pension Beneficiaries, etc.)

① The basic pension shall be paid to a person aged 65 or older and whose income recognition is less than or equal to the amount determined by the Minister of Health and Welfare (hereinafter referred to as the "selected standard").

② When the Minister of Health and Welfare determines the standard amount for selection, he/she shall ensure that 70/100 of the basic pension recipients are among those aged 65 or older.

③ Notwithstanding paragraph (1), basic pensions shall not be paid to persons prescribed by Presidential Decree and their spouses among recipients of any of the following pensions and their spouses.

The pension system is largely composed of three levels. Like the national pension, there is a public pension that the government provides to guarantee the basic living of the people, the retirement pension is for the stable retirement of workers, and the personal pension is a private pension that individuals selectively subscribe to for a leisurely life.

Korea's retirement income security system is also composed of three floors, as shown in the diagram. The first floor is a public pension system, which includes the national pension, special occupational pension (public official pension, private pension, military pension, etc.), and basic pension. The second floor is a retirement pension system, which includes retirement pensions (retirement allowances) for private companies and retirement allowances for special occupations. And on the third floor, there is a personal pension system.

As the number of senior citizens aged 65 or older increases (the total number of senior citizens aged 65 or older was 6.52 million in 2014 but 8.01 million in 2019), the number of recipients (4.35 million (66.8%) in 2019 continues to increase.

== Calculation ==
Article 5 (Calculation of Basic Pension Amount)

① The basic pension shall be calculated by considering the amount of basic pension for beneficiaries (hereinafter referred to as basic pension amount) and the amount of national pension benefits under paragraph (2) or Article 5-2.<Revised January 15, 2019> ② The standard pension amount refers to the national consumer price change rate announced annually by the head of the National Statistical Office in accordance with Article 3 of the Statistics Act, as prescribed by Presidential Decree on the standard pension amount of the previous year. The same shall apply hereinafter) and shall be notified every year. In such cases, the application period of the standard pension amount announced shall be from January to December of the relevant adjustment year.<Revised January 15, 2019, January 21, 2020>

③ Notwithstanding the first sentence of paragraph (2), the standard pension amount for 2021 shall be 300,000 won.<New 2018 March 27, 2020 January 21, 2020>

Article 5-2 of the Basic Pension Act (Special Provisions for Calculating the Amount of Basic Pension for Low-income Basic Pension Beneficiaries)

① Notwithstanding the first sentence of Article 5

② the standard pension applied to those aged 65 or older with an income recognition of 40/100 or less shall be 300,000 won.<Revised January 21, 2020>

<<Act No. 16868 (2020.1.21) This article is valid until December 31, 2020>>

The general calculation formula for determining the basic pension salary level of the national pension recipient is as follows.

Basic pension amount = (base pension amount-2/3* national pension A benefit) + additional pension amount

In other words, national pension recipients receive additional pensions instead of deducting the national pension A benefits by 2/3 of the adjustment coefficient from the base pension, and those who do not receive national pension A benefits do not receive additional pensions. The longer the national pension is subscribed to the national pension, the higher the level of national pension A benefits, and if the national pension A benefits multiplied by 2/3 is greater than the standard pension amount, the additional pension amount is received as the basic pension amount. As a result, the basic pension amount is designed to be determined between the additional pension amount and the base pension amount.

In the basic pension system, a reduction system is applied to improve equity between recipients and between recipients and non-receivers. If both you and your spouse are basic pension recipients, a couple reduction system that reduces 20% of the basic pension amount from each basic pension is applied, and it is designed to prevent income reversal between recipients and non-receivers. In addition, from 2019-2020, it was designed and operated to prevent an income reversal phenomenon between low-income recipients and general recipients due to the supply and demand of basic pensions. Through this, in 2020, low-income recipients with the lower 40% of income could receive up to 300,000 won per month for single households, and 480,000 won for married couples. In addition, general recipients with the lower 40 to 70% income were able to receive up to 2.55 million won per month for single households and 4.08 million won for married couples. Since 2021, up to 300,000 won per month has been paid to the lower 70% of income, regardless of whether it is low-income or general beneficiaries.

== Relationship with the National Basic Livelihood Security Act ==
The relationship between the basic pension system and the National Basic Livelihood Security Act is a problem that is continuously being discussed. This is because if a recipient of National Basic Livelihood Security Act aged 65 or older receives basic pension, the amount of basic pension received is reflected in the income of the National Basic Livelihood Security Act recipient, which affects the National Basic Livelihood Security Act benefit. In other words, there is no benefit from the basic pension because it is deducted from the National Basic Livelihood Security Act benefit as much as the basic pension amount, and in some cases, the possibility of being excluded from the basic living supply cannot be excluded. Even if it is excluded from the National Basic Livelihood Security Act due to the supply and demand of the basic pension, it may have a higher amount than before, but in this case, there is a problem that various reduction and exemption systems supported by the National Basic Livelihood Security Act recipients are not received. Therefore, there may be cases in which the basic pension is not applied for such reasons. In this regard, some argue that the basic pension is additionally paid because the minimum living cost guarantee level is low. In other words, the basic pension amount should be excluded from the process of recognizing basic living security income. On the other hand, the government considers public transfer income as income under the principle that the National Basic Livelihood Security Act supplemented for the minimum life cannot be maintained with individual income and property. However, support for the disabled (pension for the disabled), children (care fees), etc., which require more than the minimum cost of living to maintain basic living, is excluded from the income calculation process of the National Basic Livelihood Security Act. In terms of the universality of the basic pension, it may be meaningful to pay the basic pension separately from the National Basic Livelihood Security Act, but in terms of the supplementation of the National Basic Livelihood Security Act (supplementation less than the standard amount), it is difficult to deny the inclusion in the income calculation. This suggests that the relationship between the National Basic Livelihood Security Act and the basic pension needs to be reviewed along with discussions on pension reform and the division of roles between the national pension system and the basic pension system.
