= George Nicol =

George Nicol may refer to:

- George Nicol (athlete) (1886–1967), British sprinter
- George Nicol (bookseller) (1740?–1828), British publisher and bookseller
- George Nicol (baseball) (1870–1924), Major League Baseball player
- George Nicol (footballer) (1903–1968), Scottish footballer
- George William Nicol (1810–1884), African colonial secretary of Sierra Leone
- George Gurney Nicol, Sierra Leonean clergyman

== See also ==
- George Nichols (disambiguation)
- George Nicholls (disambiguation)
