= Silver generation =

The silver generation are people in late adulthood, a life-stage transition traditionally moving from a work-centred life to a phase of discovery and greater autonomy. Unlike labels such as baby boomers or Generation X, which are defined by an individual's birth year and grouped by generation, the silver generation is more an age range or phase of life, which all birth-range generations will pass through.

Ages for the silver generation starts at sixty to sixty-five, with the World Health Organization (WHO) referring to older populations as aged from sixty years old, and the United Nations (UN) saying older persons are those aged from sixty-five. There are 1.2 billion older adults of 60 or older globally in 2025.

This older age group shares common characteristics related to their life stage, including experiences such as planning for retirement, becoming grandparents, or seeking new purposes after children have grown up and left home.

== Global demographic shift ==
The rise of the silver generation is part of a broad global demographic shift toward older populations. People worldwide are living longer and having fewer children, causing the age distribution to skew older in most countries. Global life expectancy at birth reached 73.2 years in 2023, representing an increase of 25 years since 1960.

People 60 and over are growing in number compared with younger people, as part of population ageing. The number of people aged 60 and older worldwide projected to increase from 1.1 billion in 2023 to 1.4 billion by 2030.

The ageing of society is not confined to any one region or social class, although the demographic trend is currently more evident in developed regions. The least developed countries are expected to experience a significant rise in both the proportion and the number of older people between 2023 and 2050, with accelerated population ageing in the second half of this century.

More than half of the population will be over 50 years old by 2050 in countries like China and even youthful countries like India will see the 50+ cohort grow from 20% of the population in 2020 to roughly 34% by 2050. This unprecedented global ageing has been described by the United Nations as "an irreversible global trend". It is a demographic wave that spans wealthy and poorer nations alike, reshaping workforces, healthcare needs, and social structures around the world.

== Lifestyle and social changes ==
The silver generation today represents a financially empowered demographic in developed countries, which challenges traditional assumptions about older adults. Boomers, who have an average of $834,000 per person, possess nearly $60 trillion of wealth in the United States Generation X has about half the assets of the Boomers, while Millennials are far behind, with an average of just $68,871 per person.

The seniors of 2030 will be spending on e-commerce, experiences, and travel, in addition to all the other spending that goes along with an active life, indicating a shift away from stereotypical spending patterns focused on health care and basic needs.

Work patterns are evolving significantly among older adults. In the United States, even as the US labour force shrunk by 7.5% between 2020 and 2030, the over-75 workforce will increase by 96.5%, albeit from a low base. This trend reflects both necessity and choice as older adults remain active in the economy.

Those looking for late-career shifts will need education designed for the older learner, highlighting how the Silver Generation is actively seeking new opportunities and skills rather than simply retiring from productive life.

The definition of senior living itself is being reconsidered. Traditionally linked to the retirement age in the sixties, aligning with lifestyle shifts where children often move out for education and work.

This reflects a broader understanding that the Silver Generation is characterized more by life transitions than by chronological age alone.

== Economic impact ==
The silver generation wields significant economic power globally. In twelve major markets studied, Brazil, China, France, Germany, India, Italy, Japan, Spain, Sweden, Thailand, the UK, and the US, "870 million people from 50 to 70 years old are responsible for 27% of spending, around $7 trillion each year".

This demographic's wealth concentration is particularly notable in developed markets. "Those aged 55 and over in the US accounted for 72 percent of the population's wealth in early 2024," while "in the UK, the median total wealth belongs to those in their early 60s, whose wealth is almost 9x those in their early 30s."

Their spending patterns differ significantly from younger consumers. "They spend significantly more on individual purchases in all of the categories we researched," reflecting their preference for quality over quantity.

"In 2025, people aged 50 and older will drive 48 percent of incremental growth in global spending." highlighting their increasing economic importance.

This economic power represents a fundamental shift in global consumer markets, with the Silver Generation emerging as a dominant force in discretionary spending across multiple categories.

== See also ==
- Silver economy
- Generation
- Population ageing
- Biological life cycle
