= Glenn Gruenhagen =

American politician

Member of the Minnesota Senate from the 17th district
- Incumbent
- Assumed office January 3, 2023
- Preceded by: Scott Newman

Member of the Minnesota House of Representatives from the 25A district
- In office January 4, 2011 – January 8, 2013
- Preceded by: Laura Brod
- Succeeded by: Duane Quam

Member of the Minnesota House of Representatives from the 18B district
- In office January 8, 2013 – January 3, 2023
- Preceded by: Dean Urdahl
- Succeeded by: Luke Frederick

Personal details
- Born: February 1, 1952 (age 74) Glencoe, Minnesota
- Party: Republican Party of Minnesota
- Spouse: Emily (m. 1975)
- Children: 3 daughters
- Education: The American College of Financial Services
- Occupation: Small business owner, insurance agent

Glenn H. Gruenhagen (born February 1, 1952) is an American politician from Minnesota. He serves in the Minnesota Senate representing District 17, which includes Carver, McLeod, Meeker, and Sibley Counties. A member of the Republican Party of Minnesota, Gruenhagen has been the subject of both state and national headlines for his opposition to homosexuality and gay marriage, his climate change denial, his opposition to vaccine mandates, his denial of the results of the 2020 United States elections at both the state and federal levels, and his proposal to require instruction in Minnesota high schools on the cause of "sickness, disease, pain, suffering, and death". Gruenhagen works as an insurance agent. He owns Gruenhagen Insurance and Financial Services in Glencoe.

== Early life and education ==
Gruenhagen was born on February 1, 1952, and grew up on a dairy farm near Glencoe, Minnesota. He graduated from Glencoe High School. In 1971, while he was a student at Willmar Junior College, Gruenhagen's draft lottery number was selected. He enlisted in the United States Marine Corps in February 1971 and served at Marine Corps Base Camp Pendleton until his honorable discharge in February 1973.

After his military service, Gruenhagen enrolled at North Hennepin Community College and then the University of Minnesota, where he majored in business. He later received his Chartered Financial Consultant and Chartered Life Underwriter designations from The American College of Financial Services.

Gruenhagen was elected to the Glencoe-Silver Lake school board in 1994 and served in that position for 16 years.

== Minnesota state legislature ==
Gruenhagen was elected to the Minnesota House of Representatives in 2010, defeating Democratic nominee Mick McGuire for the seat representing District 25A, where incumbent representative Laura Brod had declined to seek reelection. After the 2012 redistricting of the Minnesota Legislature, he was elected to represent House District 17B and reelected in 2014, 2016, 2018 and 2020. In 2022, Gruenhagen defeated Democratic nominee Chad Tschimperle 70%-30% to win a seat in the Minnesota Senate, representing District 17.

== Political beliefs ==
=== Climate change ===
Gruenhagen does not accept the scientific consensus on climate change. He has called climate change "a complete United Nations fraud and lie" and claimed that those who believe in it believe that exhalation causes global warming. In a January 2021 committee hearing, he said that 97% of scientists believe in climate change only because of "lies and indoctrination". A few months later, he attempted to amend a large House climate and energy bill to redefine wind power and solar power as "dirty, inefficient and expensive".

=== Homosexuality and same-sex marriage ===
Gruenhagen believes homosexuality is "unhealthy" and an "addiction". On March 11, 2013, a day before Minnesota state legislative committees were set to hold a public hearing on a bill that would legalize same-sex marriage in the state, he raised a point of personal privilege on the House floor. He then introduced Kevin Petersen, who Gruenhagen claimed was a friend who had "left the gay lifestyle" after ten years, entered a heterosexual marriage and fathered three children. An activist, Petersen served with Gruenhagen as a member of the Pro-Marriage Amendment Forum, a group advocating for a constitutional amendment in Minnesota to prohibit same-sex marriage.

In March 2022, Gruenhagen opposed a bill banning conversion therapy, expressing his preference that the practice be called "reparative therapy" and remain accessible in Minnesota.

=== 2020 election denial ===
Following the 2020 United States and Minnesota state election cycles, Gruenhagen was rebuked by the Minnesota Secretary of State when he claimed that a large number of absentee ballots in the 2020 election were not connected to registered voters and called for a forensic audit of the state election. Gruenhagen and several other Minnesota state lawmakers then attended the "Storm the Capitol" rally in St. Paul on January 6, 2021, and were later investigated for their participation in the event.

=== Opposition to vaccine mandates ===
On January 5, 2023, Gruenhagen and other Republican state lawmakers spoke at a rally opposing the COVID-19 vaccine and workplace mandates requiring employees to receive it. Gruenhagen had previously spoken in support of a bill that would have banned COVID-19 vaccine mandates, required the state to create a "vaccine bill of rights", and set additional requirements regarding the sources of vaccine information medical providers give patients.

=== Senate File 517 ===
Later that month, Gruenhagen introduced Senate File 517, a bill that would require school districts to "provide instruction to students in grades 9 to 12 exploring the contrast between the scientific facts on how sickness, disease, pain, suffering, and death relate to the existence of complex living organisms, and how sickness, disease, pain, suffering, and death are a consequence imposed by the Creator of complex living organisms."

=== "Trump derangement syndrome" bill ===
On March 17, 2025, Gruenhagen was one of the five Republican authors of a bill, SF2589, that would designate "Trump Derangement Syndrome" as an officially recognized mental illness in Minnesota.

== Personal life ==
Gruenhagen and his wife Emily have been married since 1975 and have lived in Glencoe since 1978. They have three children. Gruenhagen is a member of the American Legion and the Glencoe Rotary Club. He owns and operates Gruenhagen Insurance and Financial Services.

== Electoral history ==
2010 Minnesota House of Representatives District 25A General Election
Party	Candidate	Votes	%
Republican	Glenn Gruenhagen	8,299	51%
Democratic	Mick McGuire	7,963	49%
Total votes		16,262	100%

2012 Minnesota House of Representatives District 17B General Election
Party	Candidate	Votes	%
Republican	Glenn Gruenhagen	11,053	58.1%
Democratic	Logan Campa	7,971	41.9%
Total votes		19,024	100%

2014 Minnesota House of Representatives District 17B General Election
Party	Candidate	Votes	%
Republican	Glenn Gruenhagen	8,801	63.9%
Democratic	John Lipke	4,939	35.9%
Total votes		13,740	100%

2016 Minnesota House of Representatives District 17B General Election
Party	Candidate	Votes	%
Republican	Glenn Gruenhagen	13,167	67.9%
Republican	Darrel Mosel	6,229	32.1%
Total votes		19,396	100%

2018 Minnesota House of Representatives District 17B General Election
Party	Candidate	Votes	%
Republican	Glenn Gruenhagen	10,843	66.7
Democratic	Ashley Latzke	5,403	33.2
Total votes		16,246	100%

2020 Minnesota House of Representatives District 17B General Election
Party	Candidate	Votes	%
Republican	Glenn Gruenhagen	15,475	71.4
Democratic	Heather Bakke	6,185	28.5%
Total votes		21,660	100%

2022 Minnesota State Senate District 17 General Election
Party	Candidate	Votes	%
Republican	Glenn Gruenhagen	27,078	70.2%
Democratic	Chad Tschimperle	11,481	29.8%
Total votes		38,559	100%
