= Sandwich generation =

People caring for parents and own children

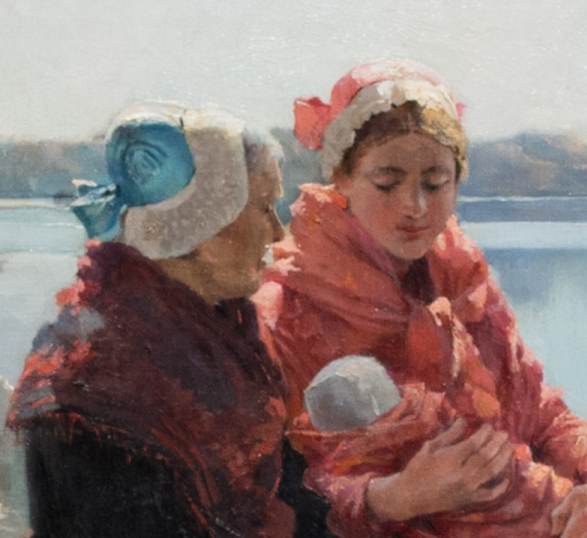
Adults sometimes need to care for both older and younger generations.

The sandwich generation is a group of middle-aged adults who care for both their aging parents and their own children. It is not a specific generation or cohort in the sense of the Greatest Generation or the Baby boomer generation, but a phenomenon that can affect anyone whose parents and children need support at the same time.

The phenomenon was recognized in the late 20th century, as changes in lifespan and a later age for childbearing meant that mothers often had small children and frail parents at the same time. For example, in the early 20th century, a woman might have her first child around age 20, when her own parents were around age 40 and not typically in need of any special care. More recently, in developed countries, women often have children closer to the age of 30, when their own parents are around age 60 and therefore at much higher risk of needing support before the grandchildren have become adults.

These "sandwiched" people become responsible for caring for their parents and their children at the same time. They may help their loved ones with daily functioning, medical services and supervision, giving medications, and aiding in financial, legal, and emotional difficulties of their loved ones as well as themselves.

== Development of the concept and definition ==
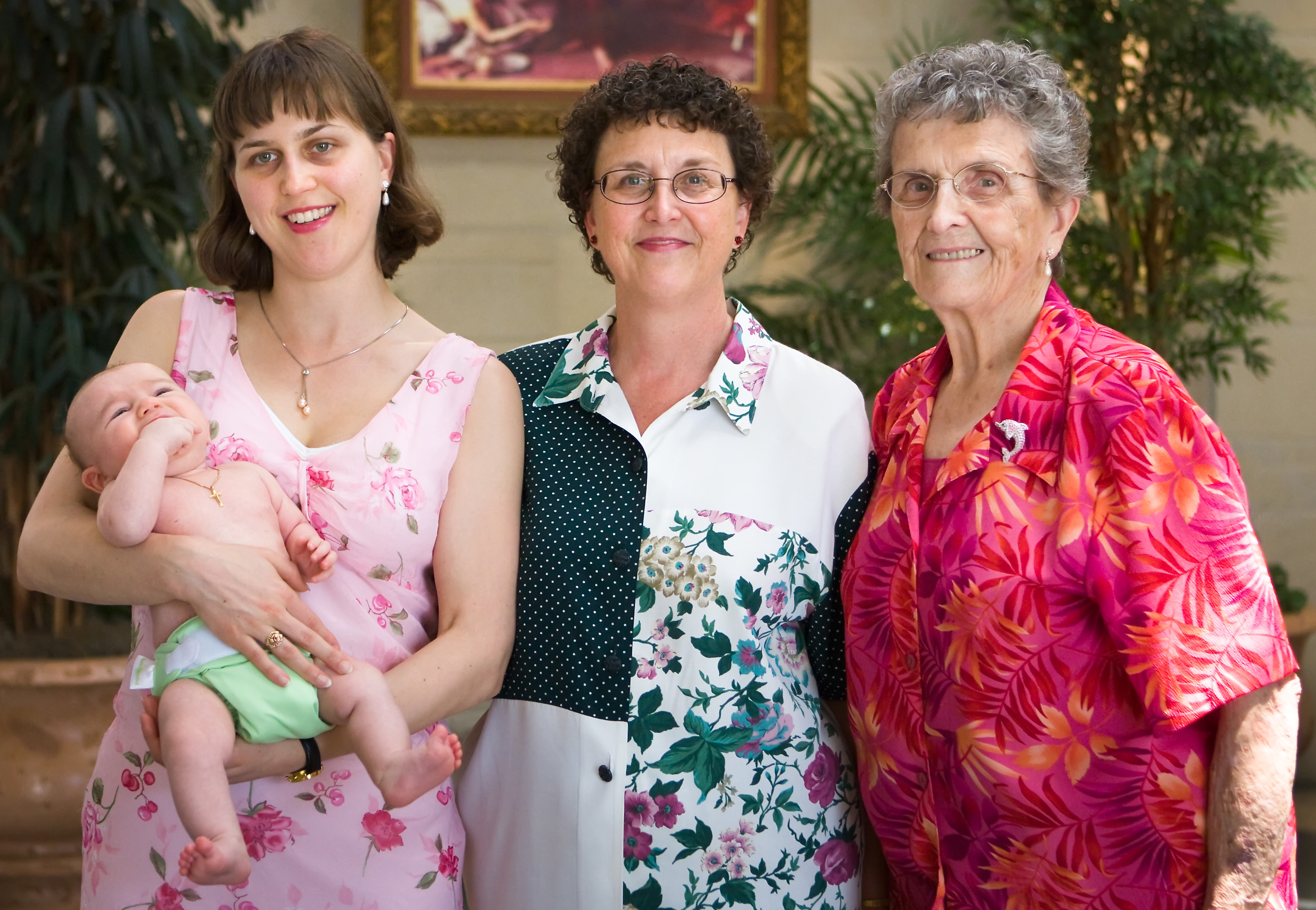
The combination of four generations – such as this baby, mother, grandmother, and great-grandmother – has been called a club sandwich after the multi-layered sandwich style.

The term sandwich generation was introduced to the social work and the gerontology communities, respectively, by Dorothy Miller and Elaine Brody in 1981. The construct refers originally to younger women in their thirties and forties who were taking care of their children, but also having to meet the needs of their parents, employers, friends, and others.

As people are living longer and children are growing up and needing continued care, the "sandwiching" effect is felt by both men and women who are in their fifties and sixties. The demographic could continue to change, but the idea remains the same, with recent research focusing on the concept of the senior sandwich generation.

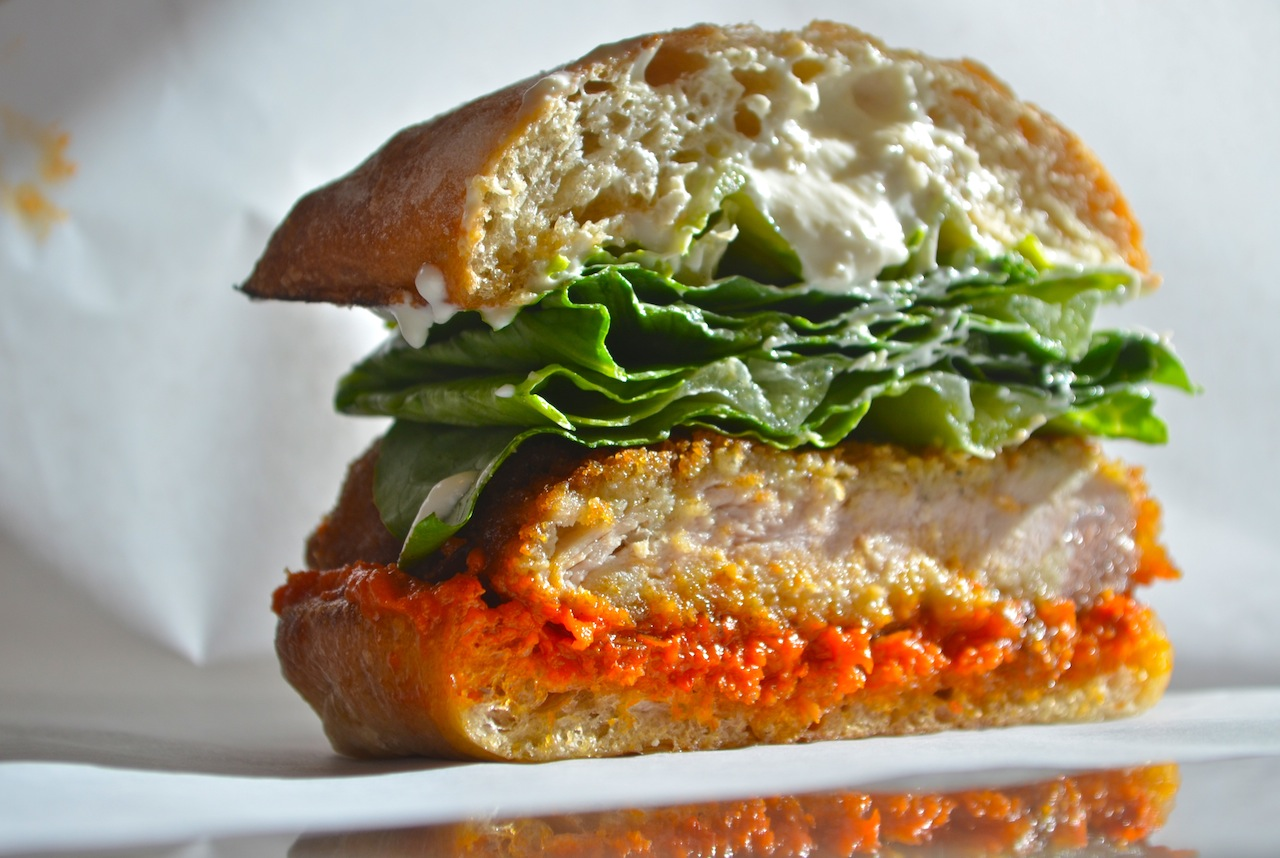
The name comes from the idea that middle-aged adults are "sandwiched" between their dependent children and their dependent parents.

Carol Abaya, nationally recognized as an expert on aging and elder/parent care issues in the US, categorized the different scenarios involved in being a part of the sandwich generation in the following way:

- Traditional sandwich generation: those sandwiched between aging parents who need care or help and their own children.
- Club sandwich: those in their 40s, 50s or 60s sandwiched between aging parents, adult children and grandchildren, or those in their 20s, 30s and 40s, with young children, aging parents and grandparents. It is named after the multi-layered club sandwich.
- Open-faced sandwich: anyone else involved in elder care.

Merriam-Webster officially added the term to its dictionary in July 2006.

== Multi-generational households ==
Due to a poor economy, research shows that modern American society has had a substantial increase of young post-college kids who return home to live with their parents or continue living with their parents throughout college. In a study done by the Pew Research Center in 2012, published in an article called "The Boomerang Generation," about 29% of young adults ranging from the ages of 25–34 live with their parents. It is also becoming more acceptable; therefore, those in this situation are generally satisfied with their situation, which is likely to make it more common and less temporary. Now the parents of these young adults are being held responsible to care for their children longer than they expected, as well as now also being expected to assume the role of caretaker for their elderly parents.

== Financial problems and statistics ==
On average, adults in the Sandwich Generation are spending approximately $10,000 and 1,350 hours on their parents and children combined per year. Typically, children require more money and "capital-intensive" care, while aging adults require more time and labor-intensive care.

Becoming part of the Sandwich Generation can put a huge financial burden on families. On average, 48% of adults are providing some sort of financial support to their grown children, while 27% are their primary support. Additionally, 25% are financially supporting their parents as well.

Some of the adults living in this sandwiched generation face financial problems regularly, having to support three generations at one time: their parents, their immediate family (theirself and their spouse) and children.

Some businesses have begun to recognize the issues faced by the sandwich generation as a financial planning and tech support problem. With the entrance of millennials, a younger demographic is now entering the sandwich generation, facing a new set of challenges as they have fewer assets but older parents.

== Other challenges ==
Becoming a part of the Sandwich Generation can affect a person's financial status, their personal time, health, and career development. Although this can affect both men and women, women are typically seen by the society as the primary supporter. In other words, women are the ones who are primarily affected; men support financially while women support emotionally and physically (they bathe, dress, toilet, clean the home, etc. while the men provide the money).

Taking care of an elderly parent while caring for one's own children is a very time-consuming task. It can significantly affect a person's personal time; they are less able participate in leisure activities. When all of these tasks start consuming their life, they become at risk for mental health problems. Depression and anxiety are a huge risk factor for the Sandwich Generation, especially for women who are involved. On the contrary, men, and some women, are typically at risk for loss of career development. They might be at the peak of their career and have to take a step down and lose their opportunity to be able to help care for their aging parent or growing children.

Due to these struggles, caregivers may develop strong feelings of stress, burnout, and depression. Locational aspects aside, most caregivers experience some common difficulties, including how to manage their time efficiently between children, older parent, family, work, and personal well-being. Another challenge may be how to find the time to ensure a healthy marriage and a healthy self for the caregivers themselves. Caregivers may also deal with feelings of isolation and guilt that come along with being in this overworked role, often making the caregiver feel as if they are still not doing enough to help. These caregivers often feel like they are "being pulled in two directions" causing symptoms of depression, marriage difficulties, and other emotional and psychological issues. Many caregivers deal with older parents who are experiencing Alzheimer's and dementia, which makes daily functioning and memory very difficult for them. Caregivers also struggle to help protect the assets of those they are caring for who are no longer competent enough to do it themselves.

== Prevalence ==
=== Australia ===
In Australia, the term 'sandwich carer' is relevant to the 2.6 million unpaid caregivers.

=== China ===
In China, it is estimated that the proportion of married couples aged 30–59, who are residing with or frequently providing transfer to both parents and children, was about 35.18%. Another study based on national survey data found that among adults aged 45–64, about one-third have at least one parent/parent-in-law and a younger grandchild. And in the sandwich generation, 58% only provide care to young grandchildren, 23% only provide care to parents or parents-in-law, 15% provide care to both generations.

=== Hong Kong ===
In Hong Kong, the grouping comprises families with an income of USD $20,000–40,000 per year. Per capita income is typically around US$10,000 per year in Hong Kong, so this places these families far above the average family in the territory. However, given very high real estate prices, it is nowhere near enough for one to afford a private residence. Hence, they are "sandwiched" between the large population who truly need public assistance, and the smaller number of people who can afford private residences and other luxury goods.

=== India ===
In rural areas of India, it is more common to see traditional family styles or 'joint families', as they are commonly referred to in India. These families are multi-generational and patriarchal households. Every family member, ranging from young to old, is responsible for caring for one another in all aspects of life. Nuclear families have become more common in suburban areas. The sandwich generation most likely has their parents living independently or having hired care.

=== Korea ===
In 1950 the Korean War resulted both in many war injuries, and in widespread poverty. There was thus little or no way for survivors to prepare for old age, as they had to work for economic renewal, not for private finance. As a result, Korea has the highest number of Sandwich Generation members than any other Asian country, thus, Korea still has a large family system. Especially in rural areas, large, extended families live together. As with the Sandwich Generation in other countries, the main concern in Korea is the additional cost of caring for elderly parents.

=== Singapore ===
In Singapore, the sandwich class typically refers to the middle class who are "sandwiched" between having luxuries and basic necessities. They generally have to support aging parents and growing children. Their household income are usually around SGD $10,000. Typical issues range from unable to upgrade to private property, inability to enjoy a lifestyle or the means to support such a lifestyle, taking care of parents and children and inability to retire early.

=== United Kingdom ===
A Carers UK report in 2012 said that approximately 2.4 million people are combining childcare with caring for older or disabled relatives. Research published in 2022 by pollster Opinium and employee benefits provider Unum estimated that around 6 million workers in the UK consider themselves to be in the 'sandwich generation'.

=== United States ===
According to the Pew Research Center, just over one of every eight Americans aged 40 to 70 is both raising a child and caring for a parent, in addition to between seven and ten million adults caring for their aging parents from a long distance. US Census Bureau statistics indicate that the number of older Americans aged 65 or older will double by the year 2030, to over 70 million.

== See also ==
- Caregiver
- Direct support professional
- Sandwich class
