= Grey pound =

Term referring to the purchasing power of elderly people

In the United Kingdom, the expression "grey pound" is used in the context of marketing and or retail sources and refers to the purchasing power of elderly people as consumers. For example, it has sometimes been used as a label for movies aimed at an older audience. Similar terms are used for other countries (e.g. "grey dollar") and for other consumer groups, as in pink money for LGBT consumers.

Saga, a company whose products and services target the over-50s, estimated the value of the grey pound at £320 billion a year in 2020. "Grey currency" is especially important in countries where older people hold disproportionate levels of wealth; in the UK, over-50s hold over three quarters of the financial wealth.

== See also ==
- Financial gerontology
- Silver economy
- Economics of ageing
