= Tokushimaru =

Retail enterprise in Japan

- Mobile supermarket Tokushimaru
- Native name: 株式会社とくし丸
- Type: Kabushiki gaisha
- Industry: mobile retailer
- Founded: January 11, 2012; 14 years ago
- Founder: Tatsuya Sumitomo
- Headquarters: Minamiuchi-machi, Tokushima, Tokushima, Japan
- Area served: Japan
- Key people: Representative director chair Kōhei Takashima; Representative director president Ayumi Shingu
- Website: Official website

Tokushimaru (Japanese: とくし丸) is a Japanese mobile retailer owned by Oisix ra daichi. The company's convoys purchase goods from local supermarkets and deliver them to customers' houses in their modified trucks to help those who struggle with buying daily groceries. Tokushimaru serve every prefecture of Japan, and a thousand convoys are in service. Tokushimaru also established a magazine, Gu~Su~Gekkan Tokushimaru (ぐ〜す〜月刊とくし丸), targeting the elderly. The company also collaborates with local governments to promote their policy and offer rural community services.

== History ==
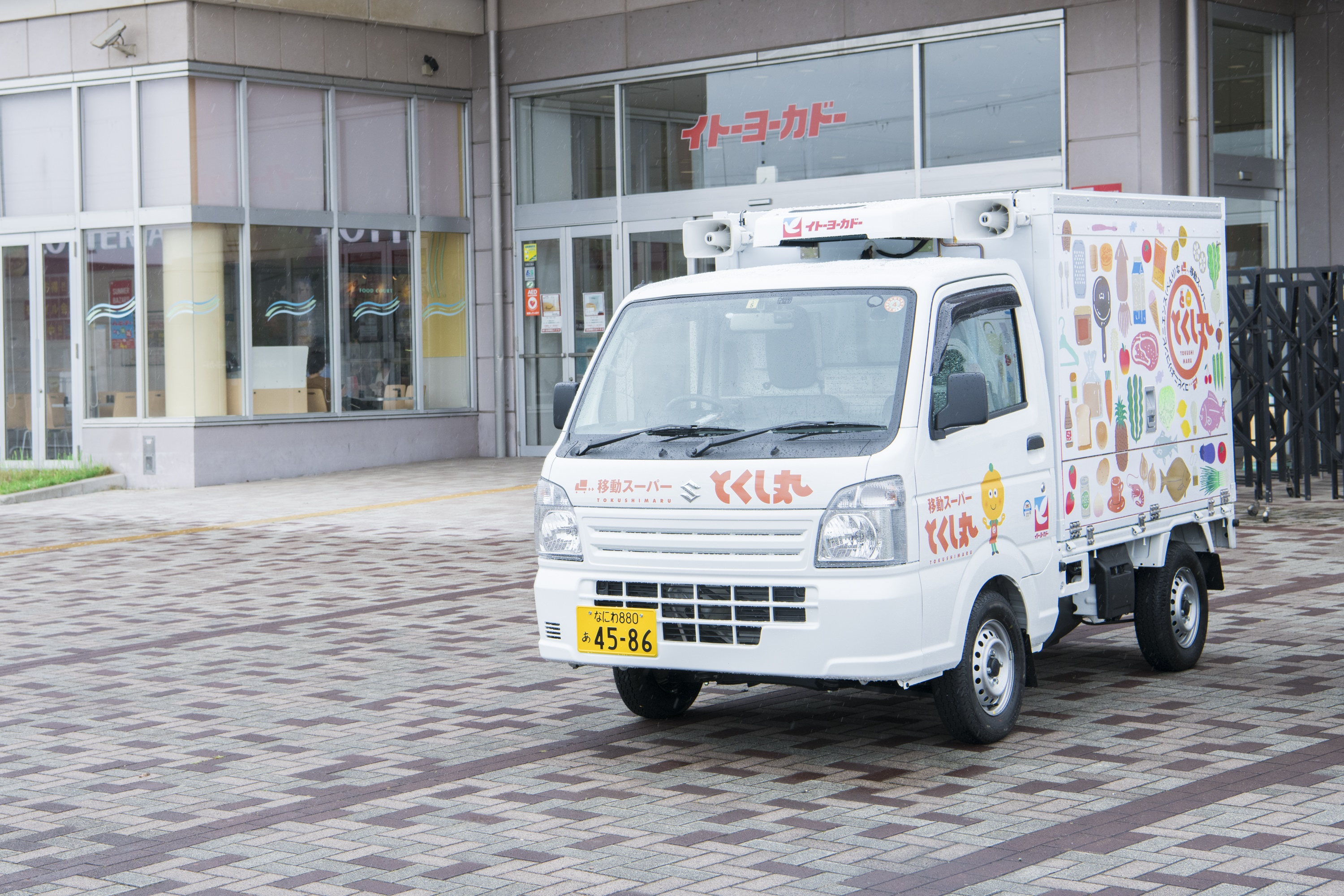
A Tokushimaru truck stopped at a Ito-Yokado

In Japan, shopping refugees are people who have a problem buying daily groceries, often because of supermarket shortage in rural areas, or they are too old to drive.

Tokushimaru was established on 11 January 2012 by Tatsuya Sumitomo (住友達也), who also established a local publishing company called Awawa Corporation. During a visit to his mother in a rural area, Sumitomo noticed her neighbour's unusual shopping behaviour when they took her for a drive. He discovered the situation of shopping refugees after interviewing them, and had the idea of founding a mobile supermarket to serve them at the time. The name Tokushimaru comes from two meanings: One is a reference to the founding city, Tokushima; the other is the pronunciation of Tokushi (篤志, "charity; benevolence").

The price of Tokushimaru is usually the price of supermarkets in Japan plus 10~20 Yen, depending on supermarkets they collbrate with. It is known as the "Plus 10 Yen rule" (+10円ルール). Tokushimaru sells about 400 types of groceries, including fresh foods. In addition, Tokushimaru described themselves as "local watching squad" (地域の「見守り隊」).

Initially, Tokushimaru mainly served rural regions. But when elderly drivers gave back their driver's licence, they found it difficult to buy daily groceries since more and more shopping districts have been closed. Seeing the problem of shopping refugees starting to grow in cities, Tokushimaru start expanding its service into urban areas such as Shinjuku or Shinagawa in Tokyo. In 2020, Tokushimaru started operating in Okinawa with Ryubo Store. At the time, Tokushimaru was operating every prefecture of Japan.

In May 2016, Oisix, now Oisix ra daichi, acquired Tokushimaru. There were 300 convoys in April 2018. There were 500 convoys on 30 April 2020, when they announced collaborating with Ito-Yokado. In February 2023, there were 100 convoys specifically collaborating with Ito-Yokado. In May 2022, there are 1,000 convoys and had become the first mobile retailer who reached the number. In 2021, its annual sales will exceed 20 billion yen

Tokushimaru established a bimonthly magazine called Gu~Su~Gekkan Tokushimaru (ぐ〜す〜月刊とくし丸) in August 2023, after noticing that its customers have reached 180,000, and the main consumers are women aged 70–80. There are 40,000 copies in the first issue. The main content was related information that the elderly were interested in, including health information, celebrity columns, and reader contributions.

== Features ==
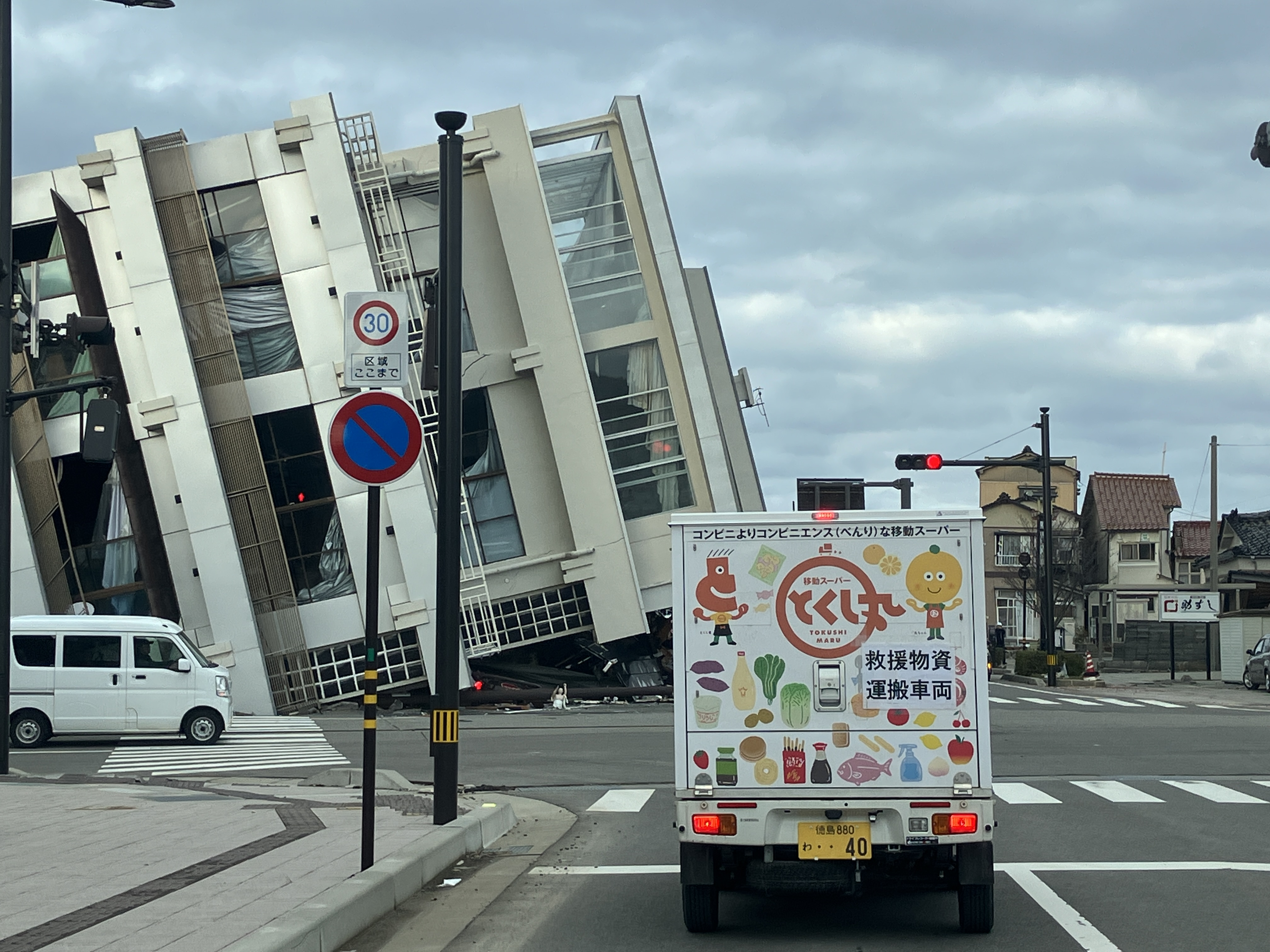
A Tokushimaru truck is entering a disaster-stricken area during the 2024 Noto earthquake

Modified by light trucks, each Tokushimaru truck stocked with approximately 400 types of groceries, totalling 1,200–1,500 items. The truck visits the community twice a week, delivering groceries directly to consumers. They also cooperate with local social services such as Social Welfare Council, Community General Support Centre, Care Manager, and Welfare commissioner. Truck conveys will visit customers during deliveries to check any unusual situations at an earlier stage.

Tokushimaru also cooperate with local governments to promote their policy, such as enlightening hyperthermia with the Ministry of the Environment, and preparion of potential earthquakes with the government of Shinjuku. During the 2024 Noto earthquake, Tokushimaru sent rescuing groceries from Albis (store) to customers in shelters in disaster-stricken areas.

Groceries from Tokushimaru trucks come from local supermarkets. Aside from providing groceries, local supermarkets also help Tokushimaru receive the remaining fresh foods and calculate accounts. They have cooperated with over a hundred local supermarkets in Japan as of September 2018. The number increased to 140 as of 2021, and over two hundred in 2025. Most "local supermarkets" are local enterprises, but sometimes major supermarket chains such as Ito-Yokado and A-Coop may also be a cooperator.

== See also ==
- Food choice of older adults
- Meals on Wheels
- Silver economy
