= George Nicholls =

George Nicholls may refer to:

- George Nicholls (commissioner) (1781–1865), British Poor Law Commissioner
- George Nicholls (British politician) (1864–1943), British member of parliament for North Northamptonshire, 1906–1910
- George Heaton Nicholls (1876–1959), British-born South African politician
- George Nicolls (also spelled Nicholls; c.1884–1942), Sinn Féin politician in the Irish revolutionary period
- George Nicholls Jr. (1897–1939), American director and editor
- George Nicholls (footballer) (1890–1970), English footballer
- George Nicholls (rugby league) (born 1944), English rugby league footballer

== See also ==
- George Nichols (disambiguation)
- George Nicol (disambiguation)
