= Solomon S. Huebner =

American insurance educator (1882–1964)

- Born: Solomon Stephen Huebner; March 16, 1882; Manitowoc, Wisconsin
- Died: July 17, 1964 (aged 82); Merion, Pennsylvania
- Occupation: Educator
- Years active: 1904–1953
- Spouse: Ethel Elizabeth Mudie
- Children: 4

Solomon Stephen Huebner (March 6, 1882, Manitowoc, Wisconsin – July 17, 1964, Merion, Pennsylvania) was Emeritus Professor of Insurance at the Wharton School of the University of Pennsylvania, Emeritus President of The American College of Life Underwriters, and Emeritus Chairman of the Board of Trustees of the American Institute for Property and Liability Underwriters (now known as the American Institute for Chartered Property Casualty Underwriters).

Huebner is known widely as "the father of insurance education." He originated the concept of "human life value", which became a standard method of calculating insurance value and need. He established the goal of professionalism in the field of insurance, developed the first collegiate level program in insurance and chaired the Department of Insurance at Wharton, and contributed greatly to the progress of adult education in this area. Huebner was a prolific writer, possibly best known for his classic work, Life Insurance.

In 2012, the Huebner Foundation moved from the Wharton School to the Department of Risk Management and Insurance at Georgia State University where it continues its mission of supporting Risk and Insurance doctoral education and research.

== Early life ==
Huebner was born on March 6, 1882, in Manitowoc, Wisconsin, on the shores of Lake Michigan. Raised on a 200-acre farm, his parents (Frederick and Wilhelmina) were major landholders and members of educated Wisconsin families. They instilled in him a strong belief in freedom, religion and in the value and power of education. They taught him to work hard and to be committed to the highest standards of personal integrity.

Huebner graduated from Two Rivers High School at age 16 in 1898. After being elected class valedictorian, his education continued at the University of Wisconsin where he was awarded a Bachelor of Letters in 1902. In addition, he was elected to Phi Beta Kappa and earned the Master of Letters the following year. His thesis was entitled: “The Distribution of Stock Holdings in American Railways.” Published in Railway Age, it so impressed the University of Pennsylvania officials that Huebner was awarded a Harrison Fellowship in Economics.

During the next two years, Huebner pursued his studies for the degree of Doctor of Philosophy. Huebner was highly acclaimed for receiving it in the shortest time possible and was among the youngest students to receive that honor in University of Pennsylvania history. He was only 23 years old.

== Career ==
Huebner may be best known for his work in life insurance education, but he was also an expert in the fields of economics, Property/Casualty Insurance, and marine insurance. He began teaching the first organized courses in the world on the Stock Exchange and the “Economics of Insurance” at the University of Pennsylvania in the fall of 1904.

At that time “Applied Economics” was viewed with some disdain by the classical economists at most universities. Huebner's research led him to the realization that no leading business school in the United States offered any type of insurance-related coursework. He applied and became the first instructor of Insurance at Wharton with an annual salary of $500.

The life insurance field was getting much publicity at that time because of the Armstrong Investigation in New York State. This was an important event in insurance history with a comprehensive legislative investigation of life insurance operations led by Charles Evans Hughes. Many years later, Huebner said that the investigation and corrective legislation that followed was “one of the best things to ever happen to life insurance.” He felt it put the business on an upward curve.

Huebner rose quickly through the teaching ranks to assistant professorship (1906); professor of insurance and commerce (1908); and in 1913, head of the University of Pennsylvania Insurance Department. This was the first insurance department of its kind in any collegiate institution.

In addition to regular coursework, Huebner also taught evening and extension classes. He lectured to the public, to professional groups in all industries, to women's clubs, and to life insurance salesmen everywhere. Huebner's commitment and vigor impressed people on a wide scale, and especially within the circles of life-insurance men. In 1927, Huebner's vision brought into being The American College of Life Underwriters. The purpose of the college was to establish certification of professionally qualified life insurance salesman, using the designation, CLU (Chartered Life Underwriter).

Huebner was elected to the American Philosophical Society in 1930.

Today, Huebner's legend lives on at both The American College and The Wharton School. The American College now offers 12 designations (including the CLU), a Master of Science in Management, and a Master of Science in Financial Services. The major in Insurance and Risk Management also remains a vital part of the Wharton School. Coursework and concentrations are available at both undergraduate and graduate levels.

== Bibliography ==
- Property Insurance (1911)
- Steamship Agreements and Affiliations in the American Foreign and Domestic Trade (1914)
- The Stock Exchange Business (1918)
- Life Insurance (1915)
- Report on Legislative Obstructions to the Development of Marine Insurance in the United States (1920)
- Report on the Status of Marine Insurance in the United States (1920)
- Marine Insurance (1920)
- The Stock Market (1922)
- The Economics of Life Insurance. Human Life Values: Their Financial Organization, Management, and Liquidation (1927)
- Life Insurance as Investment (1933)
- Property Insurance (1957)
- Life Insurance (joint authorship with Kenneth Black Jr., 1958)
