= George Nichols III =

George Nichols III, CAP is an American financial services professional with a background in banking, insurance, executive leadership, and education. He was the State of Kentucky's first African-American insurance commissioner, and in 2000 became the first African-American president of the National Association of Insurance Commissioners. He currently serves as the 10th president of American College of Financial Services in King of Prussia, Pennsylvania.

== Background and education ==
Born in Bowling Green, Kentucky, Nichols was raised by his four older sisters. He attended Alice Lloyd College and graduated in 1980. From there, he went on to get a Bachelor of Arts in sociology and economics at Western Kentucky University and then a M.A. in labor studies from the University of Louisville. Western Kentucky University has gone on to honor Nichols by naming him to their Hall of Distinguished Alumni and naming the Cynthia and George Nichols III Intercultural Student Engagement Center after him and his wife Cynthia Jean “CJ” Nichols.

Nichols earned the Chartered Advisor in Philanthropy (CAP) designation after completing The American College of Financial Services’ program for philanthropic planning in 2023.

== Career ==
Early in his career, Nichols worked as the executive director of the Kentucky Health Policy Board, vice president of marketing for Athena of North America, executive director of product development with Blue Cross Blue Shield of Kentucky, CEO of Central State Hospital in Louisville, and executive assistant to the Commissioner of the Kentucky Department for Mental Health Services. As Kentucky's first Black insurance commissioner, he led regulation of the state's $10 billion insurance industry through his expertise in health insurance reform and financial services integration.

Nichols joined The American College of Financial Services after a 17-year stint at New York Life Insurance Company, where he held principal roles in sales, P&L, strategic initiatives, and public policy. In 2007, Nichols was named to the company's executive management committee, a group of senior executives tasked with assisting the CEO in setting company policy. As a special assignment, he led an effort to identify the leadership traits of the New York Life executive of the future. Nichols also filled the role of executive vice president in the Office of Governmental Affairs, a position encompassing all the legislative, regulatory, and public policy issues at the company. He was appointed to the board of directors of Louisville's Republic Bank & Trust Company in 2020.

== Recognition and accolades ==
Nichols has been recognized for his efforts to drive change in the financial services profession and society. Savoy, a leading Black business and lifestyle magazine, named him among the “Most Influential Black Corporate Executives” twice in 2012 and 2018, and among the “Most Influential Black Corporate Directors” in 2021. He was also named to Forbes’ inaugural 2021 edition of “The Culture 50 Champions,” which identified models of business excellence in various industries who uplift Black and Brown communities through their craft and philanthropic efforts.

Because of his leadership in launching the American College Center for Economic Empowerment and Equality and its Four Steps Forward plan to promote upward mobility and wealth creation starting with Black America and expanding to all underserved communities, Nichols was honored as one of “The Ten to Watch in 2021” by WealthManagement.com. In 2022, he won a ThinkAdvisor Luminaries award for Executive Leadership, followed by InvestmentNews’ recognition in 2023 for the year's See It, Be It role model. Additionally, Nichols is the inaugural recipient of the Alonzo Herndon Award by Business Insurance Magazine. This award is in honor of the founder of Atlanta Life Insurance Company, one of the United States’ largest and Black-owned businesses.

Nichols currently serves as chair of the national board of trustees for City Year, a nonprofit organization committed to partnering with teachers and school leaders in urban areas to provide high-impact student, classroom, and school-wide support. He sits on the board of OneAmerica Financial. Nichols also serves on the board of the Cobbs Creek Foundation, which seeks to provide opportunity for the diverse youth of Philadelphia through a state-of-the-art golf and educational campus at the site of the city's first public golf course, founded in 1916.
