= George William Nicol =

Sierra Leone politician (1810–1884)

George William Nicol (1810–1884) was the first African Colonial Secretary of Sierra Leone and was one of few African senior level colonial officials in Freetown during the 19th century. Nicol belonged to the mulatto Settler class that exerted great influence in Freetown during the 19th century.

== Early life and family ==
George William Nicol was born to George Nicol and Jane Small Nicol. George Nicol was a Scottish carpenter who worked for the Sierra Leone Company during the 1790s. Jane Small was the mixed race daughter of Sophia Small, a wealthy African American Settler businesswoman who built the first two-story building in Freetown in 1796 (four years after the founding of Freetown in 1792). Nicol was practically European in appearance and was described as 'only slightly coloured' by a colonial official. The Nicols were a prosperous family; after Sophia Small died, Jane Nicol inherited a substantial amount of her mother's property. After entering into business, George Nicol also invested and built property; two houses on Water Street and a brick house worth 3500 pounds east of the Government Wharf. Nicol along with his sisters inherited the property of their father who had died in 1823. In 1853, Nicol was the second largest property owner in Freetown with a valuable estate.

== Colonial Service ==
After returning from school in England, Nicol entered the government service in 1829 and served in the Mixed Court until 1841. In 1841, Nicol served in the Colonial Secretary's Office and was promoted from Fourth to First Writer by 1859. In 1859, Nicol was appointed Colonial Secretary based upon a recommendation given by Governor Fitzjames. Nicol was essentially deputy to the Governor and served on the Governor's Council until 1868.

== Retirement and death ==
Nicol, retired from the Colonial Secretaryship in 1868 possibly due to the fact he became permanently disabled. The Colonial Treasury increased his pension to 396 pounds for serving in the harsh climate of Sierra Leone which was at that time known as the 'White Man's Grave'. Possibly because he was an 'octoroon' Nicol was given special consideration in regard to pension as the Treasury evidently thought him to be an Englishman and did not realize that Sierra Leone had been his birthplace. Nicol sold his valuable Freetown property to Charles Heddle, a mixed race Senegalese 'merchant prince' who had amassed a fortune in the groundnut trade. Nicol retired to England along with his sister, Rossetta Nicol, (1819-1882) and died in Lambeth (possibly the birthplace of his father) on 2 January 1884. His daughter, Sarah Rose Nicol,(1860-1890) married Nash Hamilton Williams (1847–1910), a colony born Maroon descendant who was the son of James Williams a merchant shopkeeper. Williams had qualified as a lawyer in 1878 and served in Freetown and Lagos.
