= The American College of Financial Services =

Private online university in King of Prussia, Pennsylvania, U.S.

- Former name: The American College of Life Underwriters
- Type: Private online university
- Established: 1927
- Accreditation: Middle States Commission on Higher Education
- President: George Nichols III
- Location: King of Prussia, Pennsylvania, United States
- Website: www.theamericancollege.edu

The American College of Financial Services is a private, nonprofit online university focused on professional training for financial practitioners. It offers many designation, certification, licensing, and master's degree programs for professionals either in or seeking to enter the financial services industry. The college lists over 200,000 alumni across financial services.

The college was founded as The American College of Life Underwriters in 1927 by Solomon S. Huebner of the Wharton School at the University of Pennsylvania. Huebner was a professional involved in the development of economic theory. His theory of human life value is used in the field of insurance. It was his vision for a college-level professional education program for insurance agents that led to the creation of the college.

When the college began, programs focused exclusively on providing education to life insurance professionals; the Chartered Life Underwriter (CLU) designation was the first credential offered by the college. Today, the college provides training for financial professionals in various fields including retirement income planning, tax planning, philanthropic planning, special needs planning, and education leading to the CFP certification. Over 80 faculty members and financial experts work at the college.

The college’s original campus in Bryn Mawr, Pennsylvania, was bought by the Jack M. Barrack Hebrew Academy in 2007. In May 2019, the college moved its operational headquarters to King of Prussia, Pennsylvania.

== History ==
The college was founded as The American College of Life Underwriters in 1927 by Solomon S. Huebner. The following year, the CLU Program saw 21 professionals earn the designation. Since then, over 100,000 financial professionals have gone on to earn the designation.

In 1978, the college became accredited by the Middle States Commission on Higher Education (MSCHE).

In 2000 and 2011 respectively, the college founded the American College Cary M. Maguire Center for Ethics in Financial Services and the American College Center for Women in Financial Services. These served as the college's first "Centers of Excellence" which have gone on to include a total of eight Centers, each with their own unique focus area representing a constituency of the financial services industry actively supported by the college.

In 2013, the college awarded its first Retirement Income Certified Professional designation. Now including nearly 10,000 designees, the RICP Program represented the college's educational shift toward a focus on financial planning specialization.

In 2018, George Nichols III, a former financial services senior executive, was appointed the 10th president and CEO of the college. Nichols outlined a new strategic vision intended to transform the college's student experience, democratize financial education more broadly, and expand the college's reach to support a growing financial services profession.

Under Nichols, the college went on to establish the American College Center for Economic Empowerment and Equality (CEEE) with a stated purpose to narrow the wealth gap with collective, community-focused solutions. To date, 13 organizations have given substantial philanthropic donations to support the Center for Economic Empowerment and Equality’s work.

In recent years, the college has worked to increase its public visibility, including the recruitment of the "FinServe Network," an elite group of alumni and volunteers committed to extending the college's reach in the profession by sharing their experiences and perspectives via social media. It also includes trade media publications and other channels. In 2025, the college launched its first consumer awareness campaign aimed at the general public rather than financial services professionals. Its aim is to promote the specialized knowledge and skills of College designees and connect their expertise to potential clients' financial needs.

== Notable alumni ==
- Glenn Gruenhagen, Minnesota State Senator
- Alfred W. Redmer, Jr., Maryland politician.
- Lynn Yeakel, Pennsylvania administrator and politician
