= Silver economy =

Economic area

Silver economy is the system of production, distribution, and consumption of goods and services aimed at using the purchasing potential of older and ageing people and satisfying their consumption, living, and health needs. The European Union has determined that all economic activity servicing those who are aged 50 and above is within the silver economy. The silver economy is analyzed in the field of social gerontology, not as an existing economic system, but as an instrument of ageing policy and the political idea of forming a potential, needs-oriented economic system for the aging population. Its main element is gerontechnology as a new scientific, research and implementation paradigm.

== History ==
The phrase "silver economy" is sometimes used interchangeably with the term "silver market" (the "ageing marketplace" or the "mature market"), which is a narrower concept. The wording "silver market" was created in the 1970s in Japan in the context of increasing of the availability of facilities for seniors. Silver market includes, among others, good, values and services for affluent older people; special solutions in trade between operators, allowing adjustments to aging workforce; ideas of universal design and transgenerational design that aim is to adapt goods and services to people of different ages ("age-friendly"), physical condition and cognitive abilities, which may result in improved social integration.

The silver economy is not a single sector, but rather a collection of products and services from many existing economic sectors, including information technology, telecommunications, financial sector, housing, transport, energy, tourism, culture, infrastructure and local services, and long-term care.

The rise of the silver economy is primarily driven by aging demographics. The portion of the global population that is 50 and older is increasing rapidly as a result of a decline in fertility rates and an increase in life expectancy. The 50 and older age group contributes significantly to spending in financial services, healthcare, retail, and real estate. Two needs are prominent in silver economy: the pleasure associated with active ageing also known as "wanting" (includes the individuals will, motivation and interests) which is more typical in the youngest of the group (65-80 years old); and that of products and services aimed at social and health care, adapted technology or the improvement of infrastructures such as the home, also known as "needing" and characteristic of the older of the group (over 80 years of age). The opportunities are varied, although the characteristics of this heterogeneous population group needs to be fully understood.

== See also ==
- Financial gerontology
- Grey pound
- Economics of ageing
- Tokushimaru
