= Pension policy in South Korea =

The poverty rate of elderly people in South Korea is the highest among the OECD countries.

Poverty rate in South Korea (age 65+) in 2011

South Korea's pension scheme was introduced relatively recently, compared to other democratic nations. Half of the country's population aged 65 and over lives in relative poverty, or nearly four times the 13% average for member countries of the Organisation for Economic Co-operation and Development (OECD). This makes old age poverty an urgent social problem. Public social spending by general government (the central, state, and local governments, including social security funds) is half the OECD average, and is the lowest as a percentage of GDP among OECD member countries.

South Koreans aged 65 or older may receive three types of pension income: social welfare, a public pension, and a private pension.

Pillars of South Korea's income support system
Pillar	Income support system
Third pillar	Individual retirement savings
Second pillar	Company pension
First pillar	National Pension Scheme
Pillar zero	Basic Old-Age Pension
Pillar zero	Basic Livelihood Security Programme

== History ==
=== 1990–2007 ===
National health insurance was introduced in South Korea in 1977. By 1989 South Korea had universal health coverage. Other social insurance programmes include Industrial Accident Compensation Insurance (IACI, South Korea's first social insurance program, introduced in 1964), and Employment Insurance (EI, introduced in 1995).

The recent trend in South Korea is towards increased welfare spending. Between 1990 and 2007, South Korean government welfare expenditure increased at a rate of 11% per year in real terms, the fastest rate of increase in the OECD area. Social expenditure between 1990 and 2001 rose from 4.25% to 8.7%, peaking at 10.9% in 1998.

=== 2007–present ===
In 2007, welfare spending in South Korea was 7.6% of GDP, compared to an OECD average of 19%. Welfare for the elderly amounted to 1.6% of GDP in the same year (a quarter of the OECD average).

The primary social welfare program in South Korea is the Basic Livelihood Security Programme (BLSP), which covers 3% of the country's population (about one fifth of the 15% of South Koreans living in relative poverty). Another program, the National Basic Livelihood Security System (NBLSS) was introduced in 2001.

In 2011, family benefits amounted to 0.5% of GDP, compared to an OECD average of 2.2%, and were the lowest in the OECD.

Pensions in South Korea are administered by the National Pension Service (NPS), introduced in 1988. It was reported that, in 2002, only 6.5% of South Koreans over the age of 60 lived on public pensions. Only about one fifth of the elderly population receives a pension, a major factor contributing to the relative poverty in which nearly half of South Korea's elderly live. This is the highest proportion among OECD countries.

Only a quarter of government welfare spending, in the form of cash payments, goes to the poorest 20% of the population. This is contributing to growing social inequality. The South Korean tax and welfare system is the least effective in reducing inequality among OECD countries.

== Social welfare ==
=== Basic Livelihood Security Programme ===
The Basic Livelihood Security Programme (BSLP) is a welfare system that provides cash payments and other benefits, such as housing and education, for citizens living in absolute poverty. The programme was established in 1999, under the National Basic Livelihood Security Act. Absolute poverty occurs when income falls below the minimum cost of living. In 2011, it was reported that approximately 1.4 million people received benefits from the BLSP, of whom 380,000 were elderly. This accounts for only 6.3% of the Korean population over the age of 65.

Strict criteria for assistance under the Programme have resulted in ineligibility for many applicants. For this reason, the BSLP does not provide full cover for the elderly. To qualify, recipients must prove that they cannot receive possible assistance from family members, and must include their assets under the means testing and income criteria. There was some relaxation of the eligibility criteria in 2003, and in 2008 the program was expanded to include a Long-Term Care Insurance for the Elderly.

=== Basic Old-Age Pension ===
South Korea introduced its Basic Old-Age Pension in 2008. According to the Ministry of Health, Welfare and Family Affairs, the Basic Old-Age Pension is "designed to enhance welfare of the elderly by providing a monthly pension payment to the elderly in need." The pension was intended to benefit workers contributing to the National Pension Scheme.

By 2012, the pension was only covering 16% of the minimum cost of living, and benefited 67% of Korea's population over the age of 65. It was extended in 2014 to provide monthly allowances of approximately $179 (200,000 South Korean won – KRW) to people over the age of 65 in the bottom 70th percentile of income earned. In 2014, approximately 4.9 million people benefited from this program.

South Korea's old-age pension scheme provides lifetime cover for individuals aged 60 or older, provided they have fulfilled the minimum requirement of 20 years of contributions to the national pension scheme beforehand. Those who have made a minimum of 10 years of contributions and who have reached the age of 60 are eligible for cover under a "reduced old-age pension" scheme.

Additionally, there is an "active old-age pension" scheme, covering individuals aged 60 to 65 who are engaged in income-earning activities. Those aged between 55 and 60 who are not engaged in income-earning activities are eligible for the "early old-age pension" scheme. Around 60% of Koreans aged 65 and over are entitled to a benefit amounting to 5% of their past average income, receiving an average of KRW 90,000.

Basic old-age pension schemes cover individuals aged 65 and older who were earning below an amount set by presidential order. In 2010, that ceiling was KRW 700,000 for a single person and KRW 1,120,000 for a couple, equivalent to around $600.00 and $960.00 respectively.

=== National Basic Livelihood Security ===
The National Basic Livelihood Security (NBLS) is a government support system that provides a guaranteed income to senior citizens not receiving family support, whose income is below the national poverty line. It was implemented in 2000 by the South Korea government in response to increasing unemployment and poverty resulting from the 1997 Asian financial crisis. The Korean government was still focusing on rapid economic development, and insufficient attention given to social welfare programs resulted in a weak safety net. The national poverty guidelines applying to the previous pension program were revised under the National Basic Livelihood Security system. In 2000, the minimum cost of living for a single person household was KRW 324,011, which increased to KRW 401,466 by 2005. Despite the revised poverty guideline, only 15% of seniors aged 65 and over received the National Basic Livelihood Security benefit, because of the eligibility requirements.

== Public pension ==
=== National Pension Scheme ===
The National Pension Scheme is the public pension scheme created in 1988 in South Korea. It is a part of Korea's Social Security Programs, and was established through the National Pension Act in 1986. To qualify for a pension, a person must be at least 62 years old and have made at least ten years of contributions. Reduced early pension can be obtained at the age of 56. The normal pension age will be raised to 65 years by 2033, and the reduced early pension age will increase to 60 years. The National Pension Scheme was created with a strong redistributive element, and participation is mandated by law. As at 2013, only 29% of the elderly received old-age pensions from the National Pension Service. One of the current issues with the National Pension Scheme is that not all retirees will be able to draw benefits from the pension, because they do not meet the ten year contribution requirement.

The South Korean pension system was created to provide benefits to persons reaching old age, to families and individuals affected by the death of their primary breadwinner, and for the purpose of stabilizing the nation's welfare state. South Korea's pensions system structure is primarily based on taxation, and is income-related. In 2007, there was a total of 18,367,000 insured individuals, with only c.511,000 persons exempted from mandatory contribution.

The current pension system is divided into four regimes, distributing benefits to participants through the national, military personnel, governmental, and private school teacher pension schemes. The national pension scheme is the primary welfare system, providing allowances to the majority of persons. Eligibility for the national pension scheme is dependent not on income but on age and residence, covering those between the ages of 18 and 59. Anyone under the age of 18 is either a dependent of a person who is covered, or falls within a special exemption to which alternate provisions apply. The national pension scheme provides for four categories of insured persons: the workplace-based insured; the individually insured; the voluntarily insured; and the voluntarily and continuously insured.

Employees between the ages of 18 and 59 are covered under the workplace-based pension scheme, and contribute 4.5% of their gross monthly earnings. The national pension scheme covers employees who work in companies employing five or more people; fishermen; farmers; and the self-employed in both rural and urban areas. Employers are also covered under the workplace-based pension scheme, and help meet their employees' compulsory 9% contribution by providing the remaining 4.5%.

The individually insured pension scheme covers anyone aged 18 to 59 who is not employed; those aged 60 or above; and people excluded by article 6 of the National Pension Act. People covered by the individually insured pension scheme must pay the entirety of their 9% contribution themselves.

Voluntarily insured persons are not subject to mandatory coverage, but may choose to be so covered. This category comprises retirees who voluntarily choose to receive additional benefits; individuals under the age of 27 without income; and individuals whose spouses are covered under a public welfare system, whether that be the military, governmental, or private school teacher pension scheme. As in the case of the individually insured, the voluntarily insured are responsible for meeting the full amount of their contribution.

Voluntarily and continuously insured persons are individuals aged 60 who wish to ensure that they fulfill the minimum insured period of 20 years to qualify for old age pension benefits. With the exception of workplace-based insured persons, all other insured persons personally cover their own 9% contribution in full. South Korea has pension portability agreements with some other countries, permitting a Korean pensioner to reside and receive their pension while ordinarily residing elsewhere. New Zealand was added to this list from 1 March 2022.

== Private pension ==
=== Corporate pension ===
Korea launched its voluntary retirement allowance scheme in 1953. The retirement allowance was given in the form of a single lump-sum payment, equivalent to one month of the base salary, for any employee who had worked for more than one year. Because there is low employment tenure in Korea, many workers receive their retirement allowance before they retire. The allowance, intended to serve in the absence of unemployment insurance, does not provide employees with enough benefits and security to cover their retirement needs.

In 2005, to provide the benefits and protection not covered by the allowance system, the government introduced the retirement pension, it is alongside this, also known as the corporate pension. The corporate pension system provides two forms of benefits in addition to the traditional voluntary personal pension saving account: the defined benefit and defined contribution plans. Pay-outs from the two new plans are provided either as a lump-sum payment on retirement, or as an annuity.

In 2009, private pension spending as a percentage of GDP was 7.9%, amounting to KRW 10.3 trillion. By the end of 2009, 1.723 million workers were already enrolled in the plan. By 2011, 2.7 million people, or 30% of regular workers, were enrolled and protected. In 2016, the benefit coverage was expanded, with 5.4 million workers enrolled in the scheme, or 15% of the total working-age population (aged 15 to 64).

However, population aging is imposing budgetary constraints on the government. Increased life expectancy, combined with a low fertility rate, will increase the old-age dependency ratio in Korea, "from 15 percent in 2010 to 71 percent in 2050." At the same time, the country is making efforts to privatize its pension system, as other developed Western countries have done. Korea lowered its replacement rate for the public pension to 50% in 2008, upon introducing the Basic Old-Age Pension. A further reduction to 40% is scheduled by 2028.

The 2007 National Pension reform did not guarantee long-term financial solvency, but rather exacerbated the need for expansion of coverage. The reform sparked an outcry from social organizations. In combination with the 2008 financial crisis, this resulted in a strong push in favour of free welfare in Korea, evident in the 2012 presidential election of Park Geun-Hye. But budgetary constraints forced the Park government to scale down its promises to increase spending without increasing tax. To fill the gap between budgetary constraints and the need for increasing social support for people over 65, the government will need to expand and strengthen corporate pension coverage as the second pillar in the income security system. 2007 data showed that Korea had a gross public pension replacement rate of just over 40%, and private pension assets were less than 5% of GDP, indicating significant room for improvement. As at 2016, less than 2% of those enrolled in the corporate pension system were receiving payment in the form of an annuity.

== Current aging status ==
During the 1970s and 1980s, the Korean government focused on rapid economic development, and social welfare was not the leading priority. Politicians relied on the Confucian societal norm of families caring for, and supporting, elderly relatives. In 2000, the proportion of people in South Korea aged over 65 reached 7%, giving the country aging society status. The national statistics service, Statistics Korea, estimates that South Korean society will reach "hyper-aged" status by 2025. The South Korean government’s 2016 Plan for Aging Society and Population estimated the cost of action to slow the falling birth rate and working population at about KRW 34 trillion.

== Trends ==
There is a trend in South Korea towards delaying marriage, contributing to a declining birthrate. This is partly related to increased unemployment rates between the ages of 25 and 29. High levels of education have created a very competitive labor market context. The number of young people holding a bachelor's degree or higher rose from 30% in 2003 to over 41% in 2016. South Korean government statistics showed that, in mid-2014, for the 15–29 age group the highest level of unemployment reached was 9.5%, for an employment rate not exceeding 41%. This expansion of higher education was not anticipated by the job market, as the South Korean youth employment rate had remained at around 60% over the preceding 30 year period. Finding employment in youth is considered a prerequisite to marrying, to ensure financial security.

== See also ==
- Ministry of Health and Welfare (South Korea)
- Poverty in South Korea
