= Foy E. Wallace =

Foy Esco (Foy E. Jr.) Wallace (30 September 1896 – 18 December 1979) was an influential figure among American Churches of Christ in the early and mid-20th century. Through his writing and speaking, Wallace gathered a considerable following among that group of autonomous churches. His skilled use of logic, combined with his charisma, propelled him to the forefront of at least three major controversies in the Churches of Christ.

== Biography ==
=== Early life ===
Foy E. Wallace Jr., was born September 30, 1896, on a farm south of Belcherville, Texas in Montague County, Texas. His father, Foy Edwin (Foy E. Sr.) Wallace (1871–1949), was a prominent preacher within churches of Christ in Texas, having been at the forefront of debate with the Disciples of Christ over mechanical instrumental music in Christian worship and missionary societies. Charles Ready Nichol (1876–1961) and Robertson Lafayette Whiteside (1869–1951) were also very influential in Wallace's thinking as was his older brother Cled Eugene Wallace (1892–1962).

He was baptized by his father in 1909 and preached his first sermon in 1912 at Stephenville, Texas. While his initial appointments derived largely from his shared name, within a short time he had made a name for himself as a preaching prodigy. Wallace would carry the nickname of "The Boy Preacher" even into early adulthood.

Wallace very rarely preached as a local minister. While he lived in a progression of Texas towns (Lott, Temple, Vernon, Wichita Falls, and Fort Worth), these cities usually served him simply as bases for his "gospel meetings" (commonly called "revivals" outside churches of Christ).

One of Wallace's few significant works as a local preacher occurred from 1928 to the middle of 1930 with the Central church of Christ in Los Angeles, California.

In the middle of 1930 Wallace was called from Los Angeles, California to Nashville, Tennessee by Leon B. McQuiddy to serve as editor of the Gospel Advocate Wallace continued in this role until 1934 when severe financial difficulty in the Great Depression combined with a series of family medical problems led to Wallace's resignation as editor of the Gospel Advocate in an attempt to recover financially. However, late in 1934 Wallace declared bankruptcy while affirming his debts. In 1937 Wallace returned to Nashville and with the assistance of longtime family friend John W. Akin (1873–1960), satisfied all debts.

=== Premillennialism ===
On February 11, 1909, Robert H. Boll (1875–1956) became the front-page editor of the Gospel Advocate. After several years of work widely acceptable to his readership, his premillennial views were expressed within its pages, to the dismay of most of the Advocate's management, including J. C. McQuiddy (1858–1924). After considerable friction, Boll was dismissed, re-hired and dismissed again in 1915. In 1916 Boll became the editor of The Word and Work, a paper formerly edited by Stanford Chambers (1876–1969), of New Orleans, Louisiana. The paper Word and Work was founded in 1908 by premillennialist Dr. David Lipscomb Watson. Especially under Chambers' ownership after 1913, Word and Work took an explicitly premillennial view. Boll moved the magazine to Louisville, Kentucky, where it continued to promote premillennialism within churches of Christ.

Boll's promotion of premillennialism led to continuing controversy from 1915 on into the 1920s, culminating in a written debate with H. Leo Boles in 1927. That debate ended amicably, but in 1932, the Advocate, under Wallace, turned its eye back toward the debate with a series of critical articles on premillennialism.

Wallace himself engaged in two well-known debates regarding premillennialism with Charles McKendree Neal (1878–1956) in 1933 at Winchester, Kentucky and Chattanooga, Tennessee. These debates established Wallace as the leader of those opposed to the premillennialists within the church.

In November 1934 Wallace participated in an equally contentious debate, also on the millennium, with Texas Baptist fundamentalist J. Frank Norris, in Fort Worth. After three raucous evenings of debate, each side claimed victory. For churches of Christ the debate became particularly divisive when ministers Frank M. Mullins and Jesse Wood from two Dallas-area Churches of Christ went to the microphone in support of Norris, a development which Norris had encouraged. Walter Estal Brightwell (1893–1957), a supporter of Wallace, wrote of the debate:

in the words of some of the boys who returned from France after the late war, I would not take a million dollars for the debate and the privilege of attending it, but I would not give a dime for another one just like it.

In October 1935 Wallace founded the Gospel Guardian as a monthly magazine primarily to combat the views of the premillennialists. The Gospel Guardian ended in June 1936 and merged with the Firm Foundation. In 1937 Wallace was the front page writer for the Firm Foundation. In 1938 Wallace founded the Bible Banner, initially also dedicated to the defeat of premillennial doctrine. By the early 1940s, every significant paper and college associated with churches of Christ took the amillennial position, often, like Wallace, never using the terms amillennial or amillennialism. By 1949, when Wallace ceased publishing the Bible Banner, this campaign had been so effective that fewer than a hundred congregations adhered to the premillennial view, and those generally isolated from the mainline, as they have remained for decades.

Nonetheless, Wallace's opposition to premillennialism caused anger in some of these power bases. Harding College president John Nelson Armstrong (1870–1944) had refused to condemn premillennialism in 1934; a partial rejection of the doctrine in 1935 did little to silence his critics, Wallace chief among them. A war of words between the two camps ensued, with Wallace and Earnest Rosenthal Harper (1897–1986) accusing Harding of sheltering premillennialists and premillennial sympathizers; Armstrong, for his part, compared Harper to the Nazis and Wallace to a pope.

=== Pacifism ===
As America entered the Second World War, another controversy emerged among churches of Christ. Christian pacifism had a long history in this body as a significant minority position, especially around Nashville and among those who attended the Bible Schools of David Lipscomb, James A. Harding and their disciples. However, in every major armed conflict the majority of members of churches of Christ participated as soldiers. Major leaders within the churches of Christ including Daniel Sommer in the north and G. H. P. Showalter in south opposed pacifism. By World War II pacifism was waning because of the surge of patriotism engendered by the war, particularly following U.S. entry into it following the attack on Pearl Harbor.. However, a significant and influential number of preachers within the churches of Christ were still pacifists. David Lipscomb had consolidated his arguments on the Christian relationship to the civil state in his book Civil Government that emerged after, and perhaps because of, Lipscomb's experience of the American Civil War. Lipscomb's views were still influential but were considered extreme by some. For example, Lipscomb believed that a ballot not backed by the bullet was worthless. Lipscomb wrote, "The man who votes to make to others fight (and all who vote do this) ought himself to fight—that is, if he is legally liable to performs this duty. He who supports the law that requires others to fight, morally and legally fights himself." Therefore, David Lipscomb did not vote. Wallace, though earlier in life sympathetic to some aspects of Lipscomb's position, his father taking the non-combatant view, supported the Christian's right to serve as a policeman or in the armed forces of the United States. He was considered by some to be an implacable foe to conscientious objectors.

As part of this effort, the Bible Banner under Wallace took issue with the writings of Lipscomb regarding pacifism in an effort that Wallace led. Wallace's point of view again largely triumphed, and most men of military age of churches of Christ embraced military service including the sons of many pacifists; however, the victory again earned him well-connected opponents. Chief among these was B. C. Goodpasture, the latest editor of the Gospel Advocate, who was publicly quiet on the "war question" but raised money for pacifist Christians placed in conscientious objector camps.

=== Racism ===
Wallace's views on race have been much discussed in recent years. Wallace was a native of the Deep South and was born and reared in a time when segregation was the law, though this had not stopped earlier figures, including David Lipscomb, from making a clean break with racist ideas, even calling them blasphemous. Nevertheless, segregated churches were the norm in the Jim Crow South.

In 1941 Wallace wrote an article in the Bible Banner titled "Negro Meetings for White People" in which Wallace argued against the mixing of the races during church meetings, stating: "I am very much in favor of negro meetings for the negroes, but I am just as much opposed to negro meetings for white people, and I am against white brethren taking the meetings away from the negroes and the general mixing that has become entirely too much of a practice in these negro meetings. Such a thing not only lowers the church in the eyes of the world but it is definitely against the interest of the negroes. If any negro preacher says that this is not true, that will be the evidence that it is true, and that he has been spoiled by the white brethren and wants to preach to white audiences. And if any of the white brethren get worked up over what I have said, and want to accuse me of being jealous of the negro preachers, I will just tell them now that I don't even want to hold a meeting for any bunch of brethren who think that any negro is a better preacher than I am! So that we can just call that argument off before it starts--and the meeting, too." He further stated that for a white man to share a room with a negro man was "a violation of Christianity itself, and of all common decency."

Marshall Keeble, the best known African American Evangelist among churches of Christ, responded to Wallace's segregationist article by defending Keeble's own work but calling the article "instructive and encouraging." Further Keeble continued to write to Wallace in the ensuing years to maintain his support and assistance.

=== Institutional debate ===
Shortly before World War II, the issue of institutionalism – that is, support of outside organizations from churches' treasuries – was debated. Some leaders (most prominently G. C. Brewer) had actively promoted church funding of Bible colleges. Others, such as Wallace, had written and spoken in opposition.

After the war, pro-institutional church members started tying church support of colleges with church support of other institutions, orphans' homes being a notably contentious example. The addition of an emotional element proved successful at persuading many who had been on the fence to the institutional side during the 1950s. It also led, however, to rancor; what had previously been a debate characterized by logic erupted into name-calling. Non-institutional brethren were called "orphan haters" and "Pharisees" and the like; for their part, non-institutionals such as Wallace returned (and at times initiated) the rhetorical fire.

In 1951, the church of Christ in Lufkin, Texas, where Wallace's brother Cled preached, split over personal disputes between non-institutionals. Thereafter, Foy Wallace, who had been the most polarizing figure in the debate, ceased arguing in favor of the non-institutional position; indeed, by the mid-1960s, he associated himself mostly with institutional churches. By the end of the 1950s Wallace claimed that the non-institutional position had been radicalized (though there had been no noticeable changes in position among those with whom he now disagreed). Wallace objected to debates among brethren "on whether it is scriptural for a congregation to perform a humanitarian service to someone not a member of the church, or whether it is right for an able church to help a weak one maintain a preacher among them ..." Wallace argued that such debates "demoralizes the church within and degrades it without." Such debates were, Wallace averred, "a sorry spectacle."

=== Personal life ===
Wallace married Virgie Brightwell on November 29, 1914. Walter E. Brightwell, Virgie's cousin, served as best man, and Wallace's older brother Cled E. Wallace performed the wedding ceremony. Together the Wallaces had five children. In 1952, while Wallace preached a gospel meeting in Cushing, Oklahoma, his wife suffered a major stroke. He cancelled his engagements in order to remain by her side and took more than a year to nurse her back to as much of her former health as possible. Family friend Roy J. Hearn (1911–2000) noted that he took care of his wife "just like she was a little baby."

=== Later years ===
Wallace lived out his later years, holding meetings, writing or re-writing almost of all of his books and writing occasionally for the religious press. The last twenty years of his life Wallace wrote a commentary of Revelation, two books on civil government, on the new versions of the Bible, on the non-institutional movement and on modernism. His estrangement with his son William was ended by their reconciliation in 1975.

In 1966 Wallace wrote a series of articles published by the Firm Foundation arguing that what the Holy Spirit does, the Word of God does. Wallace viewed the expression "gift of the Holy Spirit" from Acts 2:38 as in the possessive case. Thus the "gift of the Holy Spirit" did not mean the personal indwelling of the Holy Spirit but the Holy Spirit's gift which he believed were "the blessings of the Holy Spirit's dispensation for the Jew and the Gentile." Wallace believed that the Holy Spirit did not dwell in the Christian personally but representatively through the Word of God which is to dwell richly in each Christian. Wallace opposed the idea that there was a personal indwelling of the Holy Spirit. Wallace's work on the Holy Spirit was published in 1967 as a 120-page booklet under the title, The Mission and Medium of the Holy Spirit.

In the 1970s he published a comprehensive 850-page book attacking modern-English translations of the Bible. Wallace wrote this work before release of the New International Version (NIV), but the ink was hardly dry before he was opposing the NIV as well.

Wallace developed a blood condition similar to hemophilia and required frequent blood transfusions; from these transfusions, he developed hepatitis. His condition necessitated a move to Hereford, Texas, near his son, Wilson. He continued preaching for a time, but after two weeks in the hospital due to his disease, he suffered a stroke and died on December 18, 1979.

== Works ==
- The Neal-Wallace Discussion on the Thousand Years' Reign. This book records the discussion of modern millennial theories, held at Winchester, Kentucky, and Chattanooga, Tennessee in 1933. PROPOSITION: "The Bible clearly teaches that after the second coming of Christ and before the final resurrection and judgement, there will be an age, or dispensation, of one thousand years during which Christ will reign on the earth." Affirmative, Charles M. Neal; Negative, Foy E. Wallace Jr. This book contains 350 pages and was first published by the Gospel Advocate Company in 1933. Photos in the front of Foy E. Wallace Jr., and Charles M. Neal. Since that time two additional editions have appeared with numerous printings. The Third Edition is called the "Extended Edition," and includes an Appendix entitled, "Incipience, Course and Character of the Boll Movement." Third Edition was printed in 1976 and contains 411 pages.
- "Instrumental Music In The Worship: A Sermon by Foy E. Wallace, Jr., Evangelist". A sermon delivered by Foy E. Wallace Jr., on September 10, 1933, during a gospel meeting with the university and Walnut Street Church of Christ in Wichita, Kansas. Miss Crystal Norfleet recorded the sermon down in shorthand. This booklet contains 20 pages, printed by G. K. Wallace in 1933 using the Zona Printing Company in Wichita. This sermon may also be found in the second edition of The Certified Gospel and in The Gospel for Today. This tract went through multiple printings.
- The Gospel In Song, Compiled by Basil C. Doran and Foy E. Wallace Jr. Prepared for use in Wallace's tabernacle, tent and open air gospel meetings. This book contains 135 numbered songs and F. L. Eiland's song, "The Waving Harvest." The book also contains photographs of Basil C. Doran and Foy E. Wallace Jr. Published by the Gospel Advocate Company circa 1934.
- The Certified Gospel, First Edition – 1937. This is a book of sermons delivered at Port Arthur, Texas in 1937. The sermons are: The Certified Gospel, Who Wrote the Bible?, Christ and the Church, How and When the Church Began, The Last Will and Testament, What It Means to Preach Christ, The Gospel in Old Testament Example, The Lord's Day, Restoring the Ancient Order, Why Send for Peter?, What To Do To Be Saved, God's Call to Repentance and The Origin and Doctrines of Seventh Day Adventism. This book contains 110 pages and was printed by O. C. Lambert & Son in Port Arthur, Texas in 1937. Photos in the front of the book of Foy E. Wallace Jr., O. C. Lambert and Alfred Bass. The book was available in both hard and soft covers.
- The Church And A Faction, circa 1938. A brief description of local problems in McAlester, Oklahoma. This booklet was published by B. M. Strother and contained material by C. R. Nichol and an article by Foy E. Wallace Jr., entitled, "Law and order in the Church versus Majority Rule." Twelve thousand (12,000) copies of the first edition were printed. The first edition of this booklet contains 32 pages and photographs of C. R. Nichol and Foy E. Wallace Jr. A second edition was later printed (circa 1946) by the Roy E. Cogdill Publishing Company which was 31 pages and did not include any photographs.
- God's Prophetic Word, First Edition – 1946. This book contains the sermons that Wallace delivered from January 21 through January 28, 1945 in the Houston, Music Hall. The chapters are: The Infallible Book, The Faith Once Delivered, God's Prophetic Word, The Hope of Israel, The Church Age, The Throne of David, The Second Coming of Christ—Is It Imminent?, The Second Coming of Christ—Is It Premillennial?, Seventh Day Adventism—Its Origin and Its Errors, The Consequences of Premillennialism, Anglo-Israelism and Notes on other Prophecy Proof-Texts. This book contains 389 pages and was published by Roy E. Cogdill. The book contains photographs of Foy E. Wallace Jr., Austin Taylor and Roy E. Cogdill.
- The Certified Gospel, Second Edition, Revised and Enlarged – 1948. In addition to those sermons appearing in the first edition the following were added to this edition: Faith And Baptism, Repentance And Baptism, Baptism in the Acts of the Apostles, Baptism in the Apostolic Epistles, God's Law of Conversion, Broken Cisterns, The Sin of Sectarianism, What the Church Must Do to Be Saved, The Music Question—Pro and Con and The Boll Movement. This edition contains 257 pages and was printed by Roy E. Cogdill.
- Bulwarks of the Faith, Part One – Roman Catholicism, First Edition – 1951. A series of Addresses delivered in the Music Hall, Houston, Texas, in January 1946, refuting the Dogmas of Roman Catholicism. This book contains six chapters: 1) Viewing the Walls—A Doctrinal And Historical Perspective, 2) The Origin and Evils of Roman Catholicism, 3) The Organization of the Roman Catholic Church, 4) The Doctrines of the Roman Catholic Church, 5) The Arguments of the Catholics Scripturally Answered and 6) An Apostolic Syllabus on the New Testament Church. A Supplement contains the following sections: 1) "The Vatican Decrees and Their Bearing on Civil Allegiance," by the Honorable William E. Gladstone and 2) "The History of the Vatican Council and the Papal Syllabus," by Philip Schaff. This was the first book published by Foy E. Wallace Jr., Publications. Part One contains 330 pages. In the front of the book is a photograph of Foy E. Wallace Jr., with a portion of his library. This photograph was taken in 1951 in Marietta, Oklahoma.
- Bulwarks of the Faith, Part Two - Doctrines of the Denominations, First Edition – 1951. A Series of Addresses Delivered in the Music Hall, Houston, Texas, in January 1946, refuting the Doctrines of Protestant Denominationalism. This book contains six chapters: 1) The Legalism of the Gospel, 2) The How and the What of Bible Baptism, 3) The Security of the Believer—Is It Possible for a Child of God to Fall Away and Be Lost? 4) Spiritual Influence—What the Holy Spirit Does and How It Is Done, 5) Innovation in the Church—An Examination of the Instrumental Music Question and 6) Bulwarks of the Faith—Or, The Things Which Cannot Be Moved. A Supplement contains: An Addenda on the Erroneous Doctrines of the Baptist Church. Part Two contains 395 pages. In the front of the book is a photograph of Foy E. Wallace Jr., taken in 1951 in the pulpit of the Marietta Church of Christ, Marietta, Oklahoma.
- Bulwarks of the Faith – circa 1950s. A one volume edition of Bulwarks of the Faith was printed in the late 1950s. This book was bound in red and contained all of the matter in the first edition bound in one volume. A revised one volume edition was printed in 1975 with 729 pages.
- God's Prophetic Word, Second Edition, Revised and Enlarged – 1960. The speeches of the first edition were revised. Added material included: Excursus On Prophecy Proof-Texts, Passages From the Pioneers and Subject and Scripture Index. 573 pages. Published by Foy E. Wallace Jr., Publications.
- The Book of Revelation, First Edition – 1966. This commentary on the book of Revelation is divided into five sections. Section one: An Apocalyptic Preview. Section two: The Visional Prologue, chapters one to three. Section three: The Apocalypse of the Conquering Christ, chapters four to eleven. Section four: The Apocalypse of the Victorious Church, chapters twelve to twenty-two, verse five. Section five: The Apocalyptic Epilogue, chapter twenty-two, verse six to the end of the text. This book contains 477 pages and was published in Nashville, Tennessee by Foy E. Wallace Jr., Publications. This book has gone through seven printings.
- The Sermon on the Mount and the Civil State, First Edition – 1967. This book contains a discussion of the Sermon on the Mount (Matthew 5:1 through 7:29) and Luke 12:1-3; Romans 12 & 13. The function of Conscience is also discussed. Section two discusses the Civil State and includes sections on the fallacy of pacifism and the inconsistency of non-resistance. The Appendix includes M. C. Kurfees on "God's Law On Capital Punishment," and "The Conscientious Patriot—Go Tell That Fox" (from the Congressional Record). This book contains 261 pages. Published by Foy E. Wallace Publications, Nashville, Tennessee: 1967. There have been two printings of this book.
- The Gospel For Today: An Extended Edition of the Certified Gospel, 1967.
- The Christian and the Government, First Edition – 1968. This book contains a number of articles written during World War II by Foy E. Wallace Jr., Cled E. Wallace, C. R. Nichol, R. L. Whiteside and W. E. Brightwell. There is a section in the book entitled, "A Recapitulation of Passages," where Foy E. Wallace Jr., discusses various passages bearing on the issue of a Christian's relationship to civil government. The book contains O. C. Lambert's review of David Lipscomb's book, Civil Government, and a reply to John T. Lewis book on civil government. In addition, Glenn E. Green's booklet, "The Relation of the Christian to Civil Government and War" (first printed in May, 1941) is reprinted. Fred Amick's booklet, "Christians in Uniform" is also reprinted. This book contains 324 pages. Published by Foy E. Wallace Jr., Publications, Nashville, Tennessee: 1968. Photographs of Foy E. Wallace Jr., Cled E. Wallace, O. C. Lambert, W. E. Brightwell, Glenn E. Green and Fred A. Amick.
- The Story of the Fort Worth Norris-Wallace Debate, First Edition – 1968. This book tells the story of the Norris-Wallace Debate of 1934. Various articles, legal documents and testimonials are reprinted in this unique book. Also included are a photographic copy of Foy E. Wallace, Jr's., original hand written debate notes (re-copied by his brother Cled E. Wallace). In addition, a photographic copy of the "Extra Special Edition" of the Bible Banner is included. This book contains 346 pages. Published by Foy E. Wallace Jr., Publications, Nashville, Tennessee: 1968. This book includes photographs of Foy E. Wallace Sr., Cled E. Wallace, R. L. Whiteside, W. E. Brightwell and Foy E. Wallace Jr.
- The Mission and Medium of The Holy Spirit, First Edition – 1967. 120 pages, paper back. Second printing by Richard Black, Publisher. Chapters include: The Current Crusade, The Spirit and the Word, The Gift of the Holy Spirit, The Special Gifts of the Holy Spirit, An Exposition of the Holy Spirit Passages, The Baptism of the Holy Spirit and The Sin Against the Holy Spirit.
- A Review of the New Versions, First Edition, 1973. Chapter One: The Battle of the Book; Chapter Two: One Bible—Verbal Inspiration; Chapter Three: The Virgin Birth of Jesus Christ; Chapter Four: The Substance of the Everlasting Gospel—The Deity of Jesus Christ; Chapter Five: The Sign and the Virgin; Chapter Six: The Only Begotten Son; Chapter Seven: The Theology of the New Translators; Chapter Eight: The Revised Standard Version; Chapter Nine: The New English Bible; Chapter Ten: Today's English Version, Alias Good News for Modern Man; Chapter Eleven: The Babel of Modern Versions; and Chapter Twelve: Which Version—The Verdict of the Scholars. The Second Printing also contains an Addenda entitled, "The Battle of the Versions." This Addenda includes material from R. C. Foster and John W. Burgon. The Third Printing contains all of the material in the previous printings plus a Supplement: An Evaluation of the New International Version. 768 pages with a photograph of Foy E. Wallace Jr.
- An Evaluation of the New International Version, First Edition - 1976. 116 pages, paperback book.
- The Present Truth, First Edition – 1977. This book reprints many of the articles written by Foy E. Wallace Jr., over the years. The book also contains an Appendix which is a photographic reproduction of the January, 1936 special edition of the Gospel Guardian detailing the history of the premillennial movement. This book contains 1,068 pages. Foy E. Wallace Jr., Publications: Fort Worth, Texas. Noble Patterson Publisher-Distributor. This book contains photographs of Mrs. Foy E. Wallace Jr., Wallace's children and their spouses, the Wallaces on their golden wedding anniversary and on their wedding day. Additionally, the book contains photos of Cled E. Wallace, Foy E. Wallace Jr., at age 81 and Wallace's Gospel Advocate staff. This book has had only one edition of 1,000 copies.
- The Instrumental Music Question, First Edition – 1980. This book contains material from the pens of M. C. Kurfees, Adam Clarke, Don H. Morris, Moses E. Lard, John L. Girardeau and Foy E. Wallace Jr.
- The Revised Standard Version, 1981. This is a printing of one chapter from Wallace's book A Review of the New Versions. Paperback, 170 pages.
- The One Book Analyzed and Outlined, First Edition – 1987. This is a book of Wallace's sermon outlines which was published posthumously. DeHoff Publications, Murfreesboro, Tennessee. 528 pages.
- Commentary on Romans, Galatians and Ephesians, First Edition – 1991. Published posthumously by Foy E. Wallace Jr., Publications, Conroe, Texas. 254 pages.
- "Remember the Words of Christ," a complete sermon by Foy E. Wallace Jr. Long Playing Record produced by Noble Patterson. Recorded by Century Custom Recording circa 1968.
- "Keynotes of Scripture," a sermon by Foy E. Wallace Jr. Stereo 8-Track tape recording. (1980).
- "The Prince of Preachers," four sermons ("Keynotes of Scripture", "Remember The Words of Christ", "Kingdom of Heaven", and "Salvation,") by Foy E. Wallace Jr. Cassette tape recordings. Foy E. Wallace Jr., Publications (Fort Worth, Texas: 1980).

== Sources ==
- Sketch On The Life Of Foy E. Wallace, Jr.
- Hughes, Richard. Reviving the Ancient Faith: The Story of Churches of Christ in America.
- Harrell, David Edwin Jr. The Churches of Christ in the 20th Century: Homer Hailey's Personal Journey of Faith.
- Patterson, Noble and Terry J. Gardner, Foy E. Wallace, Jr., Soldier of the Cross.

Preceded by James Alexander Allen	Editor of the Gospel Advocate; 1930–1934	Succeeded by John Thomas Hinds
