= Robert Henry Boll =

American preacher (1875–1956)

Robert Henry Boll (June 7, 1875 – April 13, 1956) was a German-born American preacher in the Churches of Christ. Boll is most known for advancing a premillennialist eschatology within the Churches of Christ, in articles written during his editorship of the front page of the Gospel Advocate from 1909 to 1915 and after 1915 in Word and Work, leading to a dispute which was a significant source of division within the Churches of Christ in the 1930s. Boll was one of the most influential advocates for the premillennial point of view, and was most singularly opposed by Foy E. Wallace Jr. By the end of the 20th century, however, the divisions caused by the debate over premillennialism were diminishing, and in the 2000 edition of the directory Churches of Christ in the United States, published by Mac Lynn, congregations holding premillennial views were no longer listed separately.

== Early life in Germany and Switzerland ==
Boll was born in Badenweiler, Germany, to "ardently" Roman Catholic parents Max Boll and the former Magdalena Ulman. His father moved the family to Basel, Switzerland, when Boll was three years old for a short period before returning to Germany, where they lived in Karlsruhe before hardship reportedly led them to move to Mühlhausen and, later, Freiburg. The younger of Boll's sisters as well as his father died when Boll was 10 years old, and he entered the Lyceum at age 11. His mother remarried when he was 14, prompting Boll to emigrate with a maternal aunt and friends to the United States, settling briefly in Zanesville, Ohio, in 1890. He migrated to Tennessee as a farm laborer; it was there that Boll was immersed by Sam Harris, of the Churches of Christ, near Nashville, on Sunday, April 14, 1895.

== Career in the Churches of Christ ==
Boll entered the Nashville Bible School (later David Lipscomb College, now Lipscomb University) under the presidency of James A. Harding. Harding reportedly took pity on Boll, as Boll had walked 20 miles to the school in the rain, and accepted him even though all positions at the school had been filled. Boll preached his first sermon at a mission meeting in the Nashville jail.

== Protracted meeting at "Accident" ==
Encouraged by friend and fellow student Bob McMahon, he planned a "protracted meeting" of three weeks' duration which would begin on 1896 June 15, at a small log schoolhouse named "Accident" near Nashville. A few days before giving the meeting he spoke to a smaller assembly at the chapel of the Nashville Bible School which included David Lipscomb, E. G. Sewell, T. W. Brents, James A. Harding, J. W. Grant, and J. W. Shepherd: Boll remembered Shepherd slapping him on the back and saying, "Go right ahead; you will come out all right." In Boll's recollection the meeting began well, but in a few days interest had dwindled and Boll felt the energy ebbing from his own presentation: his friend McMahon concurred that the meeting should be wrapped up within a week. One more attempt at rallying the intensity of the meeting met with apparent failure as Boll finished a sermon he had considered to contain an hour of his strongest material in only 20 minutes. The next day, however, attendance was up: the meeting stayed open for two weeks, and "about seven" baptisms took place as a result.

Boll left Nashville Bible College in 1900 to further pursue his preaching career, delivering sermons in Texas, Tennessee, and Kentucky. In 1903 he visited Portland Avenue Church of Christ in Louisville, where the congregation had been led for seven years by George A. Klingman, who would later write of the fractious nature of the Churches of Christ.

== Portland Avenue Church of Christ ==
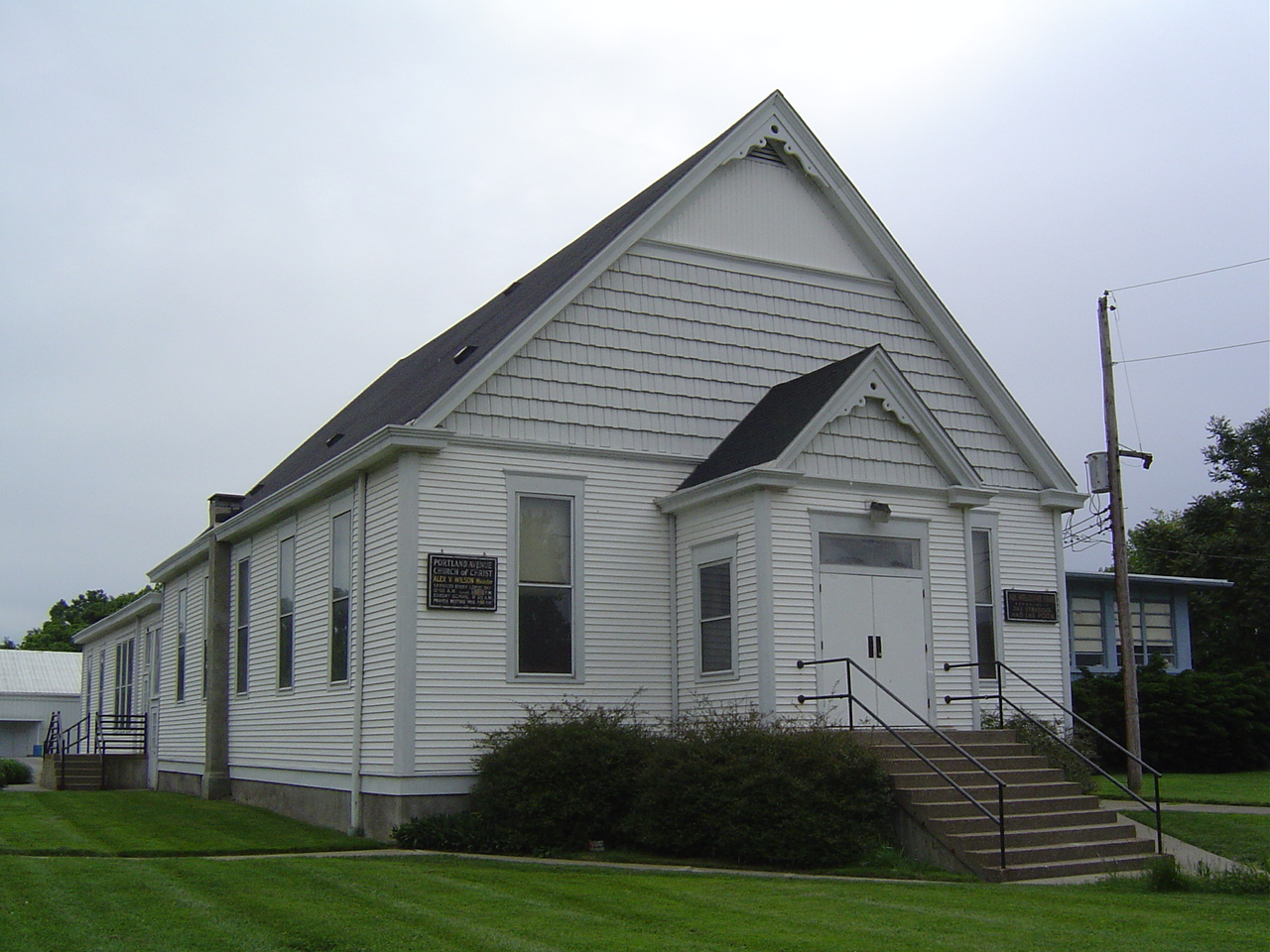
Portland Avenue Church of Christ in Louisville, Kentucky

In 1904, Boll became a located minister at Portland Avenue Church of Christ in Louisville, staying until his death in 1956, with exception of a one-year period from 1910 to 1911 during which he was the Bible teacher at the high school in Lawrenceburg, Tennessee, "on behalf of" (likely underwritten by) J. H. Stribling. In Louisville he continued his education, studying Latin and Greek at the Southern Baptist Theological Seminary.

In Louisville he married Villette Schang, who also belonged to the German-American community. They had three children, all daughters, one of whom died at the age of two.

== Popular writer and editor ==
Boll's tenure in Louisville saw him become increasingly popular as a published writer. In quick succession he became a regular contributor to Harding's The Way, then editor of the Gospel Guide published by Joe Warlick. Boll became a contributing editor to the Christian Leader in 1904.

An account of Boll's exposure to Jehovah's Witnesses theology has been described by one detractor:

F. L. Rowe, editor of the Christian Leader, was seeking to arrange a debate between one of our preachers and the notorious Charles Taze Russell, founder of the Millennial Dawn/Jehovah's Witness cult. Upon the recommendation of Bro. Boll and M. C. Kurfees, Bro. L. S. White of Denton, Texas was chosen to meet Russell. The debate was conducted in Cincinnati in 1908. Rowe wrote of Russell, he "is a man of pleasing manner, and his mild, soft tones were admired by many." Kurfees judged that White did an excellent job of upholding the truth and refuting Russell. But Boll was enamored with Russell's style and embraced his millennial heresy. Bro. G. W. Riggs recalled that while visiting Boll, he found him eagerly reading one of Russell's books. Like most other premillennialists, Boll developed his own version.

Supporters of Boll, however, dismiss this influence as apocryphal, pointing out that Boll published more articles in the Gospel Advocate critical of Russell's theology than any other writer.

In 1909, Boll became the front page editor of the Gospel Advocate, a notable publication within the Churches of Christ.

== Gospel Advocate and millennial controversy ==
Boll's initial articles on eschatological themes in the Gospel Advocate aroused little opposition, as even his later detractors would admit that Restoration Movement giants Alexander Campbell, Walter Scott, Robert Milligan, B. W. Johnson, and T. W Brents had held postmillennialist views, though Boll's detractors would point out that they did not make special efforts to spread those views. A mild term used by those who disagreed with him during this period seems to have been that his writings were considered "speculative" at best.

By 1915, however, a more ambitious series of articles led to Boll's forced resignation from the Gospel Advocate by a board consisting of J. C. McQuiddy, F. W. Smith, H. Leo Boles, A. B. Lipscomb, M. C. Kurfees, and G. Dallas Smith:

All understood Boll to promise to hold his views on that subject as a personal opinion which he would not publish or promote. Thus he was reinstated, but almost immediately renewed his hobby. His resignation was called for and accepted.

Another view, common among friends and admirers of Boll, is that jealousy of Boll on the part of some of the other editors contributed to the expulsion.

In 1916, after Boll's resignation of the front page editorship of the Gospel Advocate, he purchased an existing publication, Word and Work (founded in 1908 by Dr. David Lipscomb Watson), from its owner, Stanford Chambers, in New Orleans, Louisiana, and moved the journal to Louisville, Kentucky, to continue advancing his theology in print as well as from the pulpit. Like the original Sand Creek Address and Declaration, which did not mention instrumental music, the premier issue of Word and Work under Boll's editorship did not list differences over the millennium as a raison-d'être of the new venue for Boll's views; rather, the explicit emphasis was on themes like openness and grace.

Tensions among the congregations, especially in and around Louisville, became ruffled, but were hardly so fractious as they would become in the 1930s. Following the publication of a sharp critique by R. L. Whiteside and C. R. Nichol, of Clifton, Texas, Boll participated in a written debate with H. Leo Boles in the Gospel Advocate in 1927. At the conclusion of this debate on Unfulfilled Prophecy, both principals harmoniously concurred that the issue was not worth further discussion and should not be a cause for disfellowship.

== Later developments ==
Nonetheless, in 1933 Foy E. Wallace, responding to an invitation from Boll associate Charles McKendree Neal to debate the millennial issue, entered into the rambunctious Neal-Wallace Discussion on the Thousand Years Reign, held at Winchester, Kentucky, in January 1933; this debate jarred open a fissure which roiled congregations not only in Kentucky but also in other parts of the United States as well as overseas. Ensuing disputations, notably Wallace's 1934 debate with Baptist premillennialist J. Frank Norris, further rendered peaceful solution of the controversy untenable. It became a major controversy and source of division in Churches of Christ for decades.

It is not an easy task to read all that was written about the furor. The strength of emotion that was felt on both sides permeates the literature, and it seems no less raw nearly a century later. Much of the material from the anti-Boll side is written in the fire and brimstone style of the times, with repeated bitter and personal attacks upon Boll and his followers. The converse is true from the other side to some extent, though the pleas for continued fellowship in the face of what could be seen as a non-essential disagreement are especially pathetic and depressing to read in light of their historical failure to prevent a division. Part polemic, part legal brief, the arguments and exhortations on either side run to many pages in length. Church of Christ preachers had long been trained in parsing Greek and Latin grammar, and were regularly praised or condemned on the strengths of their ability to parse key New Testament proof texts to the greatest analytical precision possible within their hermeneutic.

Boll was strongly defended by others in print during the 1930s and 1940s.

== Legacy ==
The Portland Christian School system, founded in 1924, is the most visible sign of Boll's influence among Churches of Christ in Louisville, Kentucky. Among various geographical areas, congregations which bear Boll's premillennialist and other influences can most easily be found in Louisville, southern Indiana, and Louisiana, and in the Philippines. Tensions over millennial differences among Churches of Christ began widely subsiding by the end of the 20th century.

Preceded by David Lipscomb	Editor of the Gospel Advocate; 1909–1915	Succeeded by. . .
