= Silena Holman =

Humanitarian

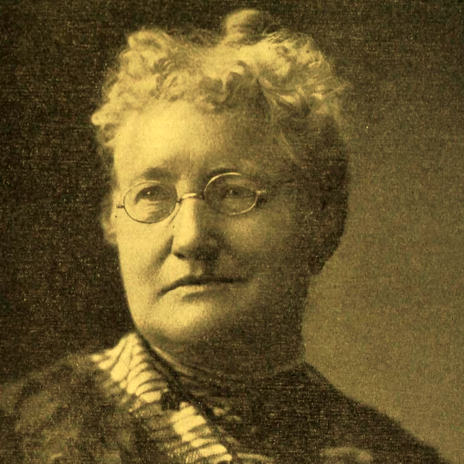
- Born: Silena Moore; July 9, 1850; Near Lynchburg, Tennessee
- Died: September 18, 1915 (aged 65); Fayetteville, Tennessee
- Occupation: Writer
- Organization: Woman's Christian Temperance Union
- Spouse: T.P. Holman (m. 1875)
- Children: 8

Silena Holman (née Moore; July 9, 1850 – September 18, 1915) was an American activist. She was a strong supporter of temperance and active in the Temperance movement and spoke out for women's rights. She was also a part on the "New Women" movement.

== Personal life ==
Silena Moore was born on July 9, 1850, near Lynchburg, Tennessee, and died September 18, 1915. She married Doctor T.P. Holman in January 1875.

Her father, Captain J. L. Moore, fought in the Civil War as a Confederate Army officer and died from battle wounds when she was only fourteen. The family had to sell their homestead to pay off accumulating debts; as the oldest, Holman took on the responsibility of caring for her three sisters and brother by earning a living as a teacher and within two years she was able to pay off the family debts.

Silena Moore met future husband Dr. T.P. Holman when he treated her for a severe illness in 1874. They were married a year later. The couple had eight children together.

== Career ==
For fifteen years, Holman was the president of the Tennessee Woman's Christian Temperance Union which membership exceeded 4,000.

She wrote for the Gospel Advocate. Her first article appeared in the February 1888 issue entitled, "Shall the Church Help the Saloon To Live?" in the article to encouraged church members to make nonintoxicating drinks for refreshment and even included her own recipe.

Also, in 1888 Holman wrote a letter to the editor of the Gospel Advocate; she was responding to an article by the editor David Lipscomb in which he argued that women do not have the authority to teach men on spiritual matters and therefore shouldn't teach mixed groups of men and women in church or smaller studies. In her response,"Let Your Women Keep Silent," Holman took a different stance from the common interpretation of Paul's command. This sparked a debate between her and the editors about the role of women in the church.

== Views ==
Silena supported the traditional view that husbands are the head of their households and wives first role is to support the family; however, she believed there was no reason to prevent women teaching on biblical topics and to support her claims she pointed to examples of women in the bible who were placed in positions of power by God.

In the 1890s, Silena aligned herself with "New Women" movement which supported women's suffrage, better education for women, and more opportunities for church leadership.
