= Woodlawn Memorial Park (Nashville, Tennessee) =

Cemetery in Davidson County, Tennessee

Coordinates: 36.1147°N 86.76°W

Woodlawn Memorial Park is one of the largest cemeteries in Nashville, known as a site where many prominent country music personalities are buried including Porter Wagoner, George Jones, Tammy Wynette, Dolly Parton, Eddy Arnold, and Marty Robbins. It is located 660 Thompson Lane, a site rich in history. The land was originally a Revolutionary War land grant of 968 acres given to John Topp in 1788, eight years before Tennessee became a US state. In 1836 it became known as "Melrose" when US Senator Alexander Barrow purchased it and built a fine mansion with that name. The property served as a field hospital in 1865 during American Civil War Battle of Nashville. The site was established as a cemetery in the 1930s, and in 1993 the property, then reduced to 205 acres, was acquired by Roesch-Patton Corporation. As of 2006, the cemetery, along with Woodlawn-Roesch-Patton Funeral Home, is owned by Service Corporation International.

Among those interred or entombed in the cemetery, there are many prominent members of Nashville's country music industry. In June 2018, Woodlawn installed the "Lynn Anderson Rose Garden", consisting of 200 Lynn Anderson Hybrid Rose Bushes (named for the singer by the National Rose Society of America), as a place of reflection and meditation in honor of the star's worldwide hit and signature song.

== Notable graves ==
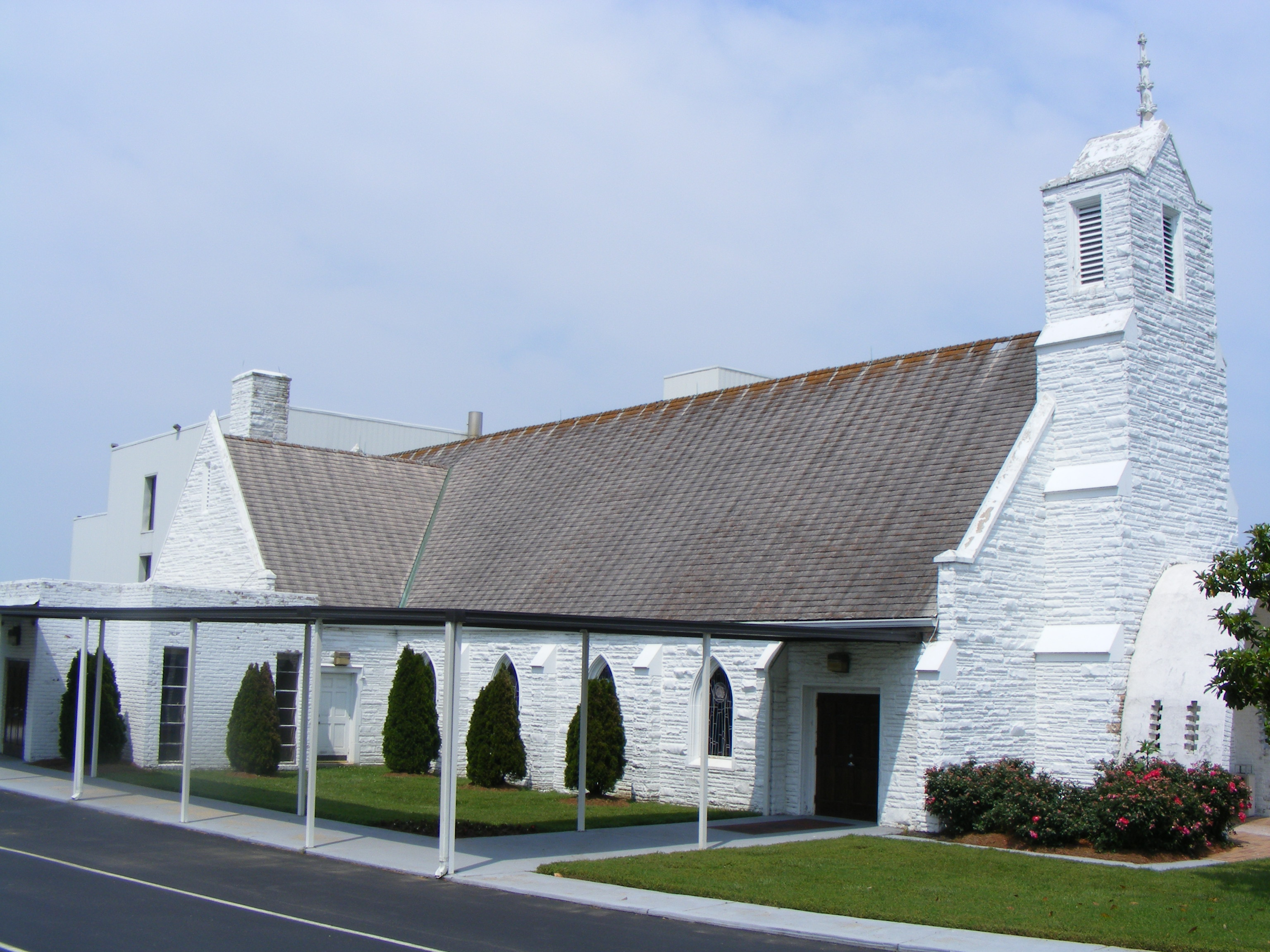
The old chapel at Woodlawn

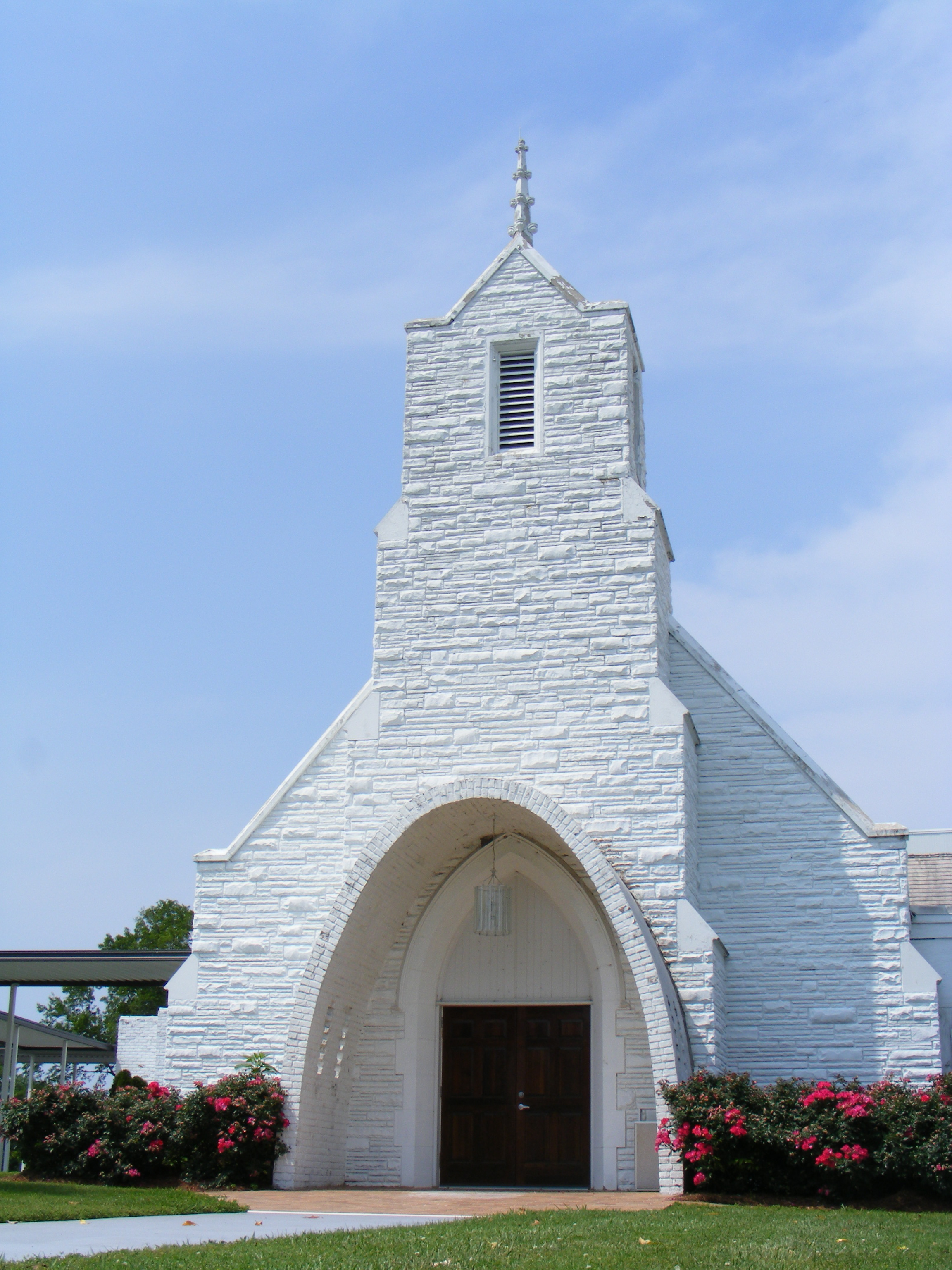
The old chapel at Woodlawn

- Joe Allison (1924–2002), songwriter
- Liz Anderson (1927–2011), country music singer, songwriter, and mother to country musician Lynn Anderson.
- Lynn Anderson (1947–2015), Country music singer
- Eddy Arnold (1918–2008), Country Music Singer, Recording Executive, Producer and Country Music Hall of Fame Member
- Ernie Ashworth (1928–2009), country music singer, Grand Ole Opry member
- Rob Bironas (1978–2014), professional American football placekicker for the Tennessee Titans
- Otis Blackwell (1931–2002), Songwriters Hall of Fame member
- H. Leo Boles (1874–1946), president of Lipscomb University.
- Margie Bowes, Country singer
- Owen Bradley (1915–1998), record producer, Country Music Hall of Fame member, Academy Award nominee
- Jim Ed Brown (1934–2015), Country Music Hall of Fame singer
- Boudleaux Bryant (1920–1987), Country Music Hall of Fame and Songwriters Hall of Fame member
- Felice Bryant (1925–2003), Country Music Hall of Fame and Songwriters Hall of Fame member
- Martha Carson, Country singer
- Billy Collins (1963–1984), boxer
- Wilma Lee Cooper, country music singer
- Stoney Cooper, Country music singer
- Jerry Chesnut (1931–2018), country music songwriter
- Little Jimmy Dickens (1920–2015), Country Music Hall of Fame singer
- Kerby Farrell (1913–1975), Major League Baseball Player, Manager Boston Braves, Chicago White Sox
- Red Foley (1910–1968), Country Music Hall of Fame singer
- D. J. Fontana (1931–2018), drummer
- Benton Cordell Goodpasture (1895–1977), Churches of Christ minister, editor of the Gospel Advocate
- Dobie Gray (1940–2011), singer and songwriter
- Vernon Holland (1948–1998), Professional football player Cincinnati Bengals, New York Giants and Detroit Lions
- Tommy Jackson (1926–1979), musician – considered by many in the country music industry to be the first great Nashville session fiddler
- Claude Jarman Jr. (1934–2025), actor
- George Jones (1931–2013), Country Music Hall of Fame Singer
- Amelia Laskey (1885–1973), ornithologist
- Larrie Londin (1943–1992), drummer
- Neal Matthews, Jr. (1929–2000), decorated soldier, Country Music Hall of Fame singer
- Claudette Frady-Orbison (1941–1966), wife of legendary singer Roy Orbison. She died when her motorcycle was hit by a truck. She is buried with her two young boys, Roy Dewayne Orbison (1958–1968) and Anthony King Orbison (1962–1968), who died together in a house fire
- Joe Moscheo (1937–2016), singer, The Imperials and Elvis backup
- K.T. Oslin (1942–2020), country singer and songwriter
- Carl Dean (1942-2025), businessman and husband of famed country singer-songwriter Dolly Parton.
- Dolly Parton (1946–2026), singer-songwriter, actress, entrepreneur, philanthropist, and founder of Dollywood, the Dollywood Foundation, and Dolly Parton’s Imagination Library. She was inducted into the Country Music Hall of Fame, the Nashville Songwriters Hall of Fame, and the Rock and Roll Hall of Fame.
- Johnny Paycheck (1938–2003), country singer
- Ben Peters (1933–2005), Nashville Songwriters Hall of Fame songwriter
- Lynn Peterzell (1955–1994), noted audio engineer
- Webb Pierce (1921–1991), Country Music Hall of Fame singer
- Dottie Rambo (1934–2008), Gospel singer and songwriter. Named songwriter of the century in the early 1990s, Grammy and Dove winner, Gospel Music Hall of Fame member for self and family group The Rambos, Nashville Songwriters Hall of Fame, composed over 2,500 songs
- Marty Robbins (1925–1982), Country Music Hall of Fame singer
- Jerry Reed (1937–2008), Country music singer and Actor
- Jim Sasser (1936–2024), United States Senator and Ambassador
- Dan Seals (1948–2009), 1980s country singer, of 1970s pop/rock duo England Dan & John Ford Coley
- Margo Smith (1939-2024), singer and songwriter
- Red Sovine (1917–1980), country singer
- Brock Speer (1920–1999), gospel music singer
- Mel Street (1933–1978), country singer
- JD Sumner (1924–1998), singer, Elvis' backup, Gospel Music Hall of Fame member
- Van Stephenson (1953–2001), Country singer, songwriter. He was a member of Blackhawk
- Gordon Stoker (1924–2013), singer The Jordanaires
- Mack Vickery (1938–2004), songwriter, singer, musician, Alabama Music Hall of Fame
- Porter Wagoner (1927–2007), Country Music Hall of Fame singer
- Tammy Wynette (1942–1998), Country Music Hall of Fame singer
