= Trevathan =

Trevathan is a surname. Notable people with the surname include:

- Danny Trevathan (born 1990), American football player
- Edwin Trevathan, American child neurologist, pediatrician, and epidemiologist
