= John Hinds =

John Hinds may refer to:

- John Hinds (politician) (1862–1928), Welsh businessman and politician
- John Hinds (doctor) (1980–2015), British motorcycle trauma doctor
- John Thomas Hinds (1866–1938), gospel preacher, teacher and evangelist for the Churches of Christ
- John Darwin Hinds, Wales' first Black, Muslim councillor, and first Black mayor
