= Goodpasture (disambiguation) =

Goodpasture is a surname. Notable people with the surname include:

- Benton Cordell Goodpasture (1895–1977), preacher and writer in the Churches of Christ
- Ernest William Goodpasture (1886–1960), American pathologist and physician, after whom Goodpasture syndrome is named
