= Ira North =

Churches of Christ preacher

- Born: Ira Lutts North; August 31, 1922; Ethridge, Tennessee, U.S.
- Died: January 15, 1984 (aged 61); Nashville, Tennessee, U.S.
- Education: Abilene Christian College (B.A.); University of Illinois (M.A.); Louisiana State University (PhD)
- Occupation: Preacher
- Years active: 1939–1982
- Known for: Ministry at Madison Church of Christ
- Notable work: Amazing Grace Bible Class; Balance - A Tried And Tested Formula For Church Growth
- Spouse: Avon Stephens North

Ira Lutts North (August 31, 1922 in Ethridge, Tennessee – January 15, 1984 in Nashville, Tennessee) was a preacher and author within the Churches of Christ.

North's family operated the North Funeral Home in Lawrenceburg, Tennessee in addition to the family farm in Etheridge, so that he grew up in somewhat more affluent circumstances than most Middle Tennesseans of the Great Depression era.

North received his education at David Lipscomb College (now Lipscomb University, Abilene Christian College (now Abilene Christian University (B.A.), University of Illinois (M.A.), and Louisiana State University (Ph.D.).

At the age of 17 North began a 43-year preaching ministry that ranged from Illinois and Louisiana to Tennessee. His longest ministry service was for Madison Church of Christ in Madison, Tennessee (suburban Nashville). He began preaching for the Madison church in 1953 and continued there for over 30 years. During the latter part of his tenure, he also served as editor of the Gospel Advocate, the longest-running and most-influential periodical in the Churches of Christ, having been originally established prior to the American Civil War and edited for a long time afterwards by David Lipscomb. During his time as its primary minister, the Madison church grew to one of the largest Churches of Christ worldwide. In failing health due to cancer, he retired to his farm in the Neely's Bend section of Madison shortly before his death.

North wrote several books, most notably Balance - A Tried And Tested Formula For Church Growth. He was also the primary teacher on the nationally televised Amazing Grace Bible Class, often taped on Sunday nights at the Madison building, which featured lessons like "If I Were a Woman" among other topics.

North's son Steve became an attorney after graduation from the Pepperdine University school of law and eventually moved his practice to a stone building near the Madison Church of Christ building which was the former home of "Colonel" Tom Parker, manager of Elvis Presley, while his daughter-in-law, Jo Ann North, was the longtime Assessor of Property for Davidson County, Tennessee; both are now retired.

An encourager of Sunday School programs, Vacation Bible School and other youth outreach protrams, the Gospel Advocate posthumously called him a "lover of the very young" in 1990.

His wife, the former Avon Stephens, whom he wed in 1939, died in April 2008.

Preceded by B. C. Goodpasture	Editor of the Gospel Advocate; 1977–19__	Succeeded by...
