= Firm Foundation =

Religious periodical published in Texas, US

- Editor: H. A. "Buster" Dobbs
- Categories: Churches of Christ
- Frequency: Monthly
- First issue: 1884
- Final issue: 2010
- Country: United States
- Language: English

The Firm Foundation was a religious periodical published monthly in Houston, Texas, for members of the Churches of Christ. It was established in 1884 by Austin McGary. The Firm Foundation was, for the next hundred years, one of the two most influential publications among the Churches of Christ along with the Gospel Advocate.

== History ==
Austin McGary founded the Firm Foundation in large part to combat David Lipscomb's views on rebaptism, as McGary adopted essentially the view which had already been espoused by John Thomas. David Lipscomb consistently argued that if a believer was baptized out of a desire to obey God, the baptism was valid, even if the individual did not fully understand the role baptism plays in salvation. Lipscomb and others among the Churches of Christ in Middle Tennessee routinely accepted Baptist converts without requiring them to be rebaptized. Austin McGary argued strongly that to be valid, the convert must also understand that baptism is for the forgiveness of sins. Thus, McGary did not regard baptisms performed in a Baptist church to be valid. McGary's view became the prevailing one in the early 20th century, but the approach advocated by Lipscomb never totally disappeared. By the end of the 20th century a practice of having the question discerned by the congregational leadership and the individual had again become widespread.

McGary was succeeded as editor by G. W. Savage in 1902. Savage was succeeded by a group of editors in 1906. From 1908 to 1983 there were only two editors: G. H. P. Showalter and Reuel Lemmons. Showalter and Lemmons maintained an editorial policy consistent with the mainstream of Churches of Christ, and during that period many wrote for and supported both the Firm Foundation and the Gospel Advocate.

The Showalter family sold the Foundation in 1983 to H. A. "Buster" Dobbs and Bill Cline. The editorial policy changed significantly under the leadership of Dobbs, supporting a "strongly conservative constituency" and "targeting progressives and 'change agents,' especially in educational institutions and highly visible congregations of Churches of Christ."

The last version of the Firm Foundation website available on the Internet Archive's Wayback Machine dates from June 5 of 2008. The last issue of the Firm Foundation received by those with a paid subscription was vol. 125, no. 1, which bears the date "January 2010."

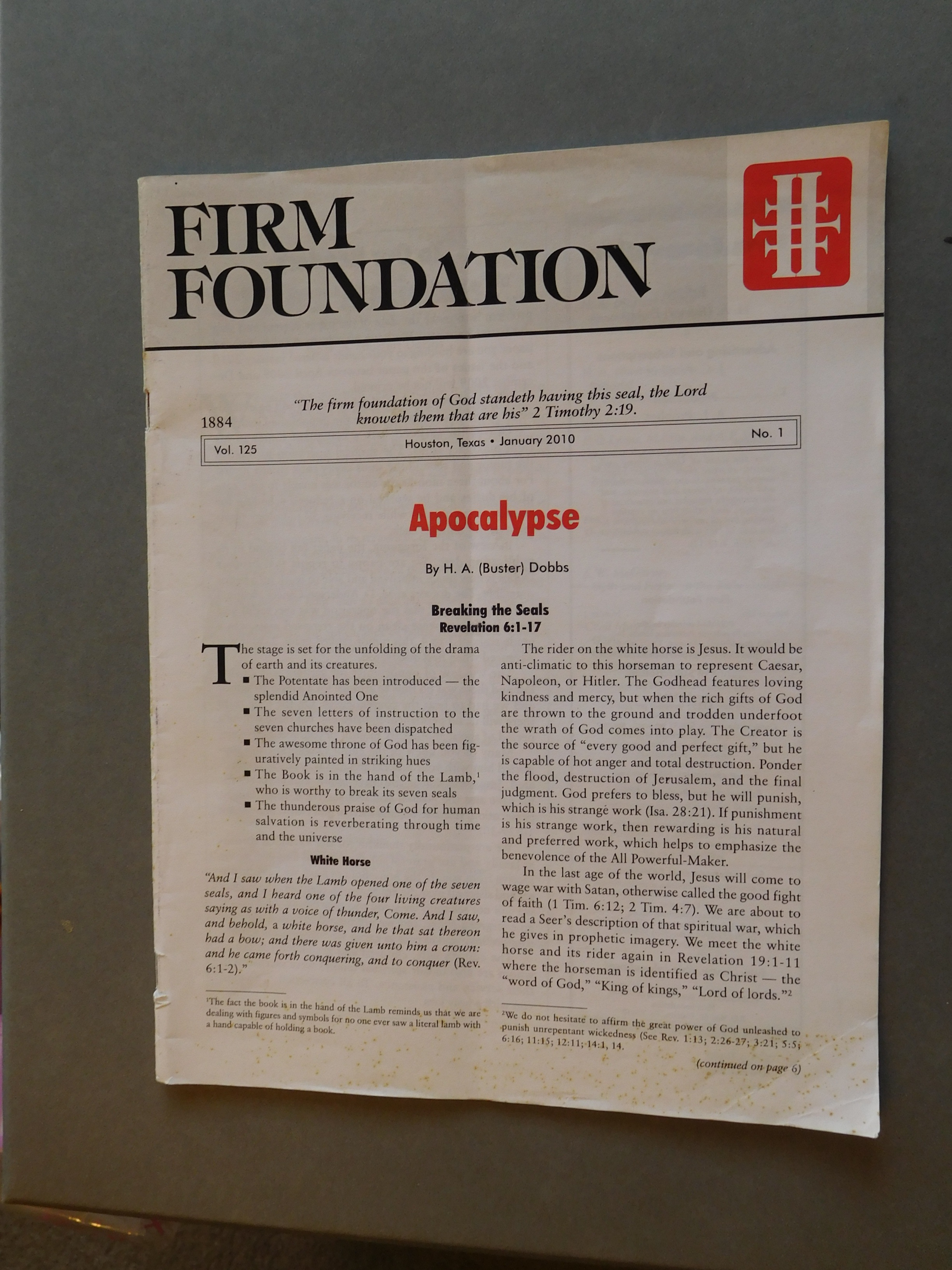
Front Page of the Last Issue of the Firm Foundation (vol. 125, no. 1, January 2010).

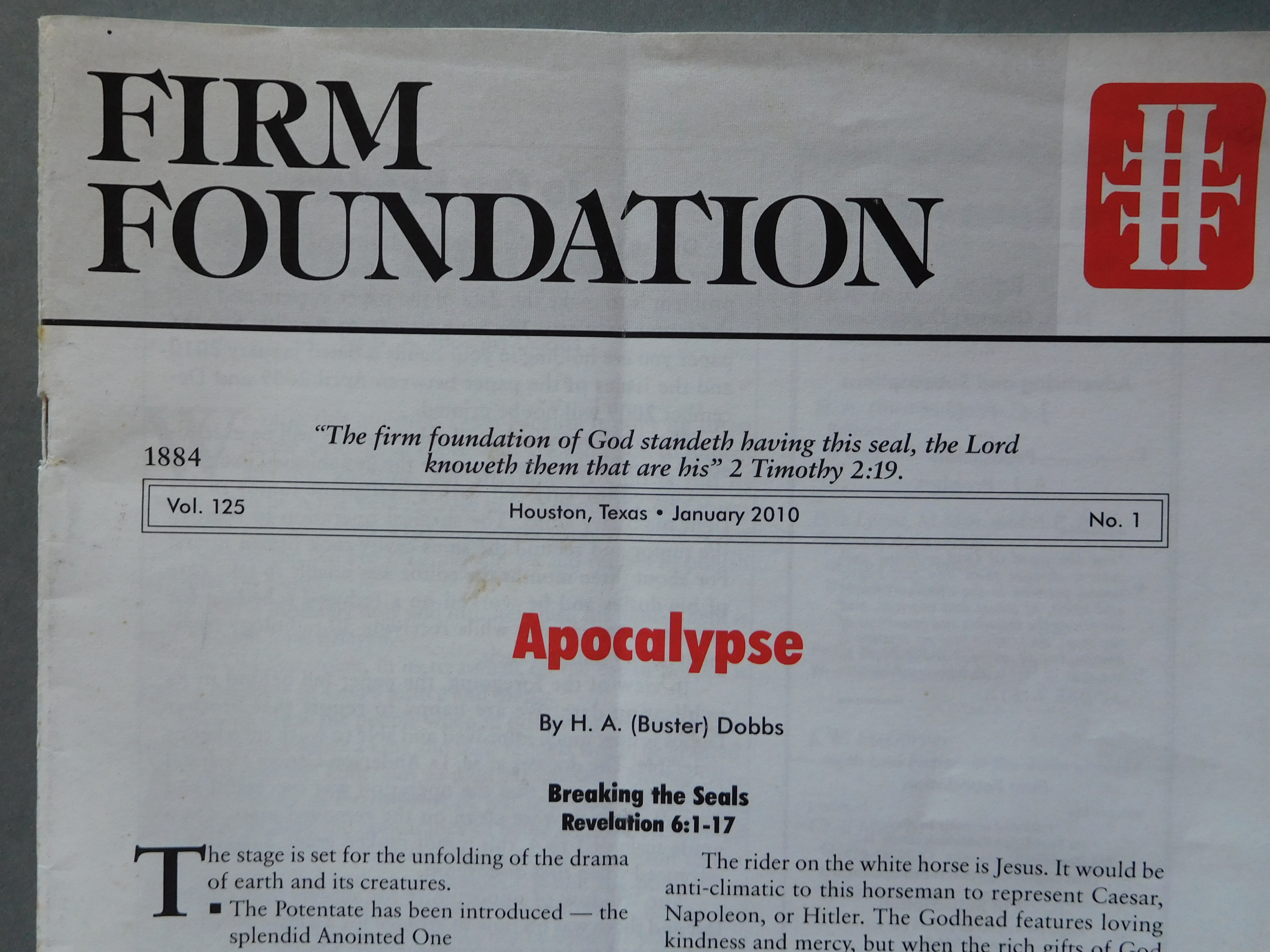
Close-up of the front page from the last issue of the Firm Foundation (vol. 125, no. 1, January 2010)
