= Benjamin Franklin (clergyman) =

American minister (1812–1878)

Benjamin Franklin (February 1, 1812 – October 22, 1878) was an important conservative figure in the American Restoration Movement, especially as the leading antebellum conservative in the northern United States branch of the movement. He is notable as an early and lifelong mentor of Daniel Sommer, whose support of the 1889 Sand Creek Declaration set in motion events which led to the formal division of the Churches of Christ from the Disciples of Christ in 1906.

According to contemporary biographies "His early religious training was according to the Methodist faith, though he never belonged to any church until he united with the Disciples."

== Biography ==
=== Early years ===
Born near present-day Belmont County, Ohio, in 1812, Franklin was said to be a fourth-generation descendant of a brother of American Revolutionary War figure Benjamin Franklin, for whom he was named. He was the eldest son of a fairly big family.

When Franklin was near 21 years old, thus in late 1832 or early 1833, Franklin's father moved the family to farmland about three miles (5 km) south of Middletown in Henry County, Indiana. Franklin himself purchased 80 acres (320,000 m^{2}).

=== Career ===
==== Restoration Movement conversion ====
In November 1834, pioneer Restoration Movement preacher and elder Samuel Rogers moved to the Falls of Rough Creek in Henry County from Kentucky, becoming a neighbor of the Franklin family.

Rogers began to preach Restoration Movement doctrine using a local schoolhouse to deliver his orations. He was quickly rejected as heretical by the Methodist leadership in the area; however, his family was sympathetic toward the neighbor and soon came under his theological influence. Franklin was baptized by full immersion in 1836 by Rogers near Middletown in Henry County, Indiana, along with many others who were baptized in the same meeting. (One source also credits Elijah Martindale in Franklin's conversion.) Of those baptized at this meeting, six or seven would go on to become preachers in the movement: Franklin, three of his brothers, Eider Adamson, John T. Rogers, and possibly another whose name was forgotten by one of Rogers' biographers.

==== Early ministry and editorship ====
At the Connersville State Meeting in 1842, Franklin was designated as the lead evangelist of the northeastern quarter ("district") of Indiana: the districting plan soon failed for lack of local funds to pay the evangelists' salary of US$500 (~$16,681 in 2025) per year.

Franklin began preaching at New Lisbon, Indiana in 1842. He began publishing his Reformer in 1845, soon changing the name to Western Reformer. He moved to Milton, Indiana in 1846 and published the journal from his own shop. This publication was to be merged with Hall's Gospel Proclamation as the Proclamation and Reformer in 1850. Franklin served as one of two secretaries at the Disciples' eighth state meeting at Columbus, Indiana, which convened on October 3, 1846.

Later, Franklin published the Christian Age with collaborator David S. Burnet. His last publication was the American Christian Review begun in 1856: following Franklin's death the name of the paper would be changed to the Octographic Review. He was said to have influenced the founding of Butler University as well as other national societies, and was also said to have been an abolitionist and pacifist, like many of his contemporaries within the movement.

After changing residences several times in Indiana and Ohio, Franklin settled in Cincinnati, Ohio in 1850, where he remained for 14 years. It was during the 1850s that Franklin changed his views to oppose missionary societies.

==== The American Christian Review ====
In 1856, Franklin began to publish the ultra-conservative American Christian Review, which he published until his death in 1878. Its influence, initially considerable, was said to have waned following the American Civil War. Franklin undertook a rigorous program of publication correspondence, and traveling lectures which took him to "many" U. S. states and Canada.

Franklin's last move was to Anderson, Indiana, where he lived from 1864 until his death.

==== Traveling orator ====
In 1871 Franklin gave a series of sermons at Wellsburg, West Virginia. It was here that he attracted the interest of a young Bethany College student named Daniel Sommer, becoming a lifelong mentor of Sommer, who would take up Franklin's mantle as publisher following Franklin's death. Sommer would become notable for his participation in the 1889 Sand Creek Address and Declaration, a particularly strong statement of exclusivity which helped to drive the split between the Disciples of Christ and more conservative Church of Christ.

=== Personal life ===
Franklin married Mary Personet on December 15, 1833, with whom he had eleven children. Nine survived to adulthood. He died suddenly at his home in Anderson, Indiana.
