= Burritt College =

Coordinates: 35°44′48″N 85°27′45″W

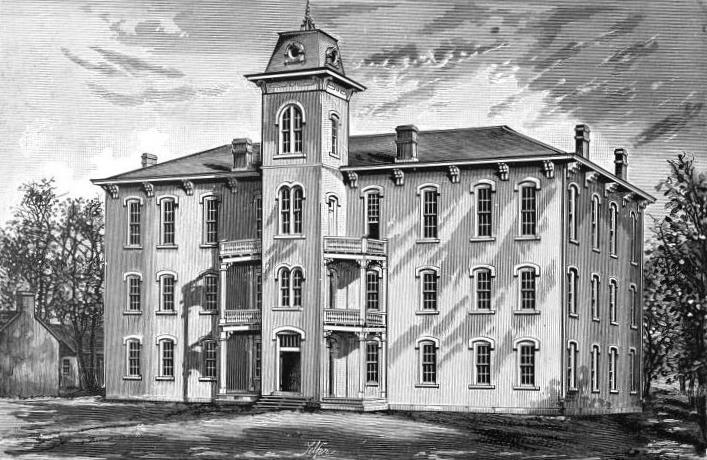
Burritt College

Burritt College (1848 - 1939) was a college in Spencer, Tennessee, United States. Established in 1848, it was one of the first coeducational institutions in the South, and one of the first state-chartered schools in southern Middle Tennessee. Operating under the auspices of the Churches of Christ, the school offered a classical curriculum, and stressed adherence to a strict moral and religious code. While the school thrived under the leadership of presidents such as William Davis Carnes (1850–1858, 1872–1878) and William Newton Billingsley (1890–1911), it struggled to compete for students after the establishment of state colleges and public high schools in the early 20th century. It closed in 1939.

== History ==
The idea for a school in Spencer was first proposed by Nathan Trogdon, a brick mason who had built the second Van Buren County Courthouse in the town. By the late 1840s, a 12-member board of trustees had been formed with Charles Gillentine as president. In 1848, the Tennessee General Assembly passed a law chartering the institution, which was named in honor of activist Elihu Burritt. Funds for the school were raised from among the residents of White, Warren, and Van Buren counties. When classes began on February 26, 1849, the college had an enrollment of 73 students and employed three teachers.

The first president of the college, Isaac Newton Jones, was a graduate of Irving College in nearby McMinnville. He established the college's curriculum, but left after only one year. His successor, William Davis Carnes, played a critical role in shaping the college's policies, most notably introducing coeducation in 1850 and instituting a strict moral and religious code. The policy allowing coeducation met staunch opposition at first, but Carnes defended it, stating, "It is God's law that the young of the opposite sexes should exert a healthful influence in the formation of each other's characters, and no place is better suited to this purpose than the classroom and lecture room." To alleviate fears, Carnes modified the school's code to bar all communication between the sexes outside classrooms or other supervised events.

Carnes' moral code barred swearing, gambling, smoking, and drinking. He struggled to curtail drinking, however, in spite of introducing increasingly stringent measures, including the expulsion of anyone caught in possession of alcoholic beverages. He finally turned to local law enforcement, pleading with them to hunt down moonshiners operating in the Spencer area, and destroy their stills. In an apparent act of retaliation, the president's house and the girls' dormitory were burned in 1857. Disgusted, Carnes resigned to become president at East Tennessee University (the modern University of Tennessee). He was succeeded by John Powell, who had been president of the Central Female Institute in McMinnville.

The college closed at the outset of the Civil War in 1861 as many of its male students left to fight in the Confederate army. The college's relative isolation protected it during the first half of the war, though it was eventually occupied by Union troops. With the help of Carnes, who had returned to the area to escape the horrors of the war, the school briefly reopened in 1864. It was forced to close by the Union Army, however, due to concerns over Confederate guerrilla activity in the area. The Union Army occupants used the main hall as a barracks, and dormitories were converted into stables. The campus grounds were trampled and damaged, and the buildings were left in a state of ruin. At the end of the war, the college's trustees sold part of its campus to raise funds for repairs. With Carnes' help, the school managed to reopen shortly after the close of the war. Martin White, a Burritt graduate remembered by students for having walked the entire distance from his home in North Carolina to Spencer to enroll at the school, was hired as president. Carnes was rehired as president in 1872.

During the 1870s, Thomas Wesley Brents, a physician who had recently relocated to Spencer, offered his assistance to Burritt, and began raising money for the college. With his help, the campus more than doubled in size, and a new administration building was constructed. However, Brents demanded he be made president. This angered Carnes, who resigned in 1878, allowing Brents to take over. During his four-year tenure, Brents increased the college's enrollment and overhauled its curriculum. By the time he had resigned in 1882, however, enrollment had started to decline. In subsequent years, the school struggled financially, and was finally forced to close in 1889. The Board of Trustees considered selling the college's campus, but ultimately decided to reopen the school.

In hopes of reviving the college, the Board hired a Burritt graduate, William Newton Billingsley, as president. Billingsley stabilized the college's finances, and managed to increase enrollment to over two hundred students by the end of the decade. In 1897, the college reported an annual income of $25,000, 164 students, 10 teachers, and three thousand books. The early 1900s were among the most prosperous in the school's history, as enrollment never dipped below 200 during this period.

On March 5, 1906, the college's main building was destroyed by fire. At a meeting the following day, the college's administrators and students agreed to finish the year and make plans to rebuild. Classes were held at the campus church and in private residences until the end of the term. The college was closed for several months while a new building was constructed. In spite of fundraising struggles, the new building was completed in 1907.

Burritt again suffered with enrollment issues following the departure of Billingsley in 1911, due in part to the opening of two state normal schools in the region: Middle Tennessee State in Murfreesboro and Tennessee Polytechnic Institute (modern Tennessee Tech) in Cookeville. The Board struggled to find a permanent president until the hiring of Henry Eugene Scott in 1918. During the 1920s, Scott overhauled the curriculum to bring it more in line with that of a typical preparatory school and junior college, offering courses in agriculture, typing, bookkeeping, and teacher training, as well as high school courses. By the 1930s, Burritt had become dependent on the Van Buren County school board for much of its funding. When the school board decided to build a county high school in 1936, Burritt was no longer able to compete for students. It finally closed in 1939.

=== List of presidents ===
- Isaac Newton Jones, 1849–1850
- William Davis Carnes, 1850–1858
- John Powell, 1858–1861
- Martin White, 1867–1870
- John Powell, 1870–1872
- William Davis Carnes, 1872–1878
- Thomas Wesley Brents, 1878–82
- Aaron Tillman Seitz, 1882–1886
- A.G. Thomas, 1886–1887
- William Howard Sutton, 1887–1889
- William Newton Billingsley, 1890–1911
- White Solomon Graves, 1911–1915
- Harvey Denson, 1915–1916
- Henry Baker Walker, 1916–1917
- White Solomon Graves, 1917–1918
- Henry Eugene Scott, 1918–1939

== Curriculum ==
Throughout the 19th century, Burritt College provided a classical education, with a core that focused on sciences, philosophy, classical languages, and mastery of the English language. The college held session for two 21-week terms (Fall and Spring) per year. Students were required take at least three, but no more than four, classes per term. Students who completed the curriculum were awarded with a Bachelor of Arts or a Master of Arts.

During its early decades the college was divided into two departments: the "academical" and the "collegiate." Students in the academical department were required to take Latin, mathematics, geography, spelling, writing and history during their first year, with Greek and English composition added in the second. Students in the collegiate department were to take courses in Latin, Greek and mathematics during the first three years, and chemistry, geology, political and moral philosophy, astronomy, "evidences of Christianity," and criticism during their senior year. Electives included French, German, drawing and painting, music, and needlework and embroidery. Anatomy, physiology, botany, and gymnastics were added to the curriculum during the Brents administration. Bible classes were added to the curriculum in the 1910s. By the 1920s, the curriculum focused on more practical trades such as teacher training, bookkeeping, typing, and agriculture.

A typical day during the Carnes and Powell administrations began at 5 A.M., with students initially preparing their rooms for inspection. This was followed by a one-hour study period and a half-hour devotional in the main hall. Classes and recitations were held throughout the remainder of the day, which ended with another half-hour devotional. Students were required to engage in private study for two hours during the evening. Daily chapel attendance was initially mandatory, but this was no longer the case by the 1890s. Students were also required to engage in 30 minutes of calisthenics per day.

Extracurricular activities initially focused on the college's two literary societies: the Philomathesian, founded in 1851, and the Calliopean, founded in 1878. Both societies possessed thousand-volume libraries, and engaged in weekly debates. Athletic programs were eventually added. By the 1920s, Burritt was competing with other regional schools and clubs in baseball, basketball, football, and tennis. The program included women's teams in basketball and tennis.

== Location ==
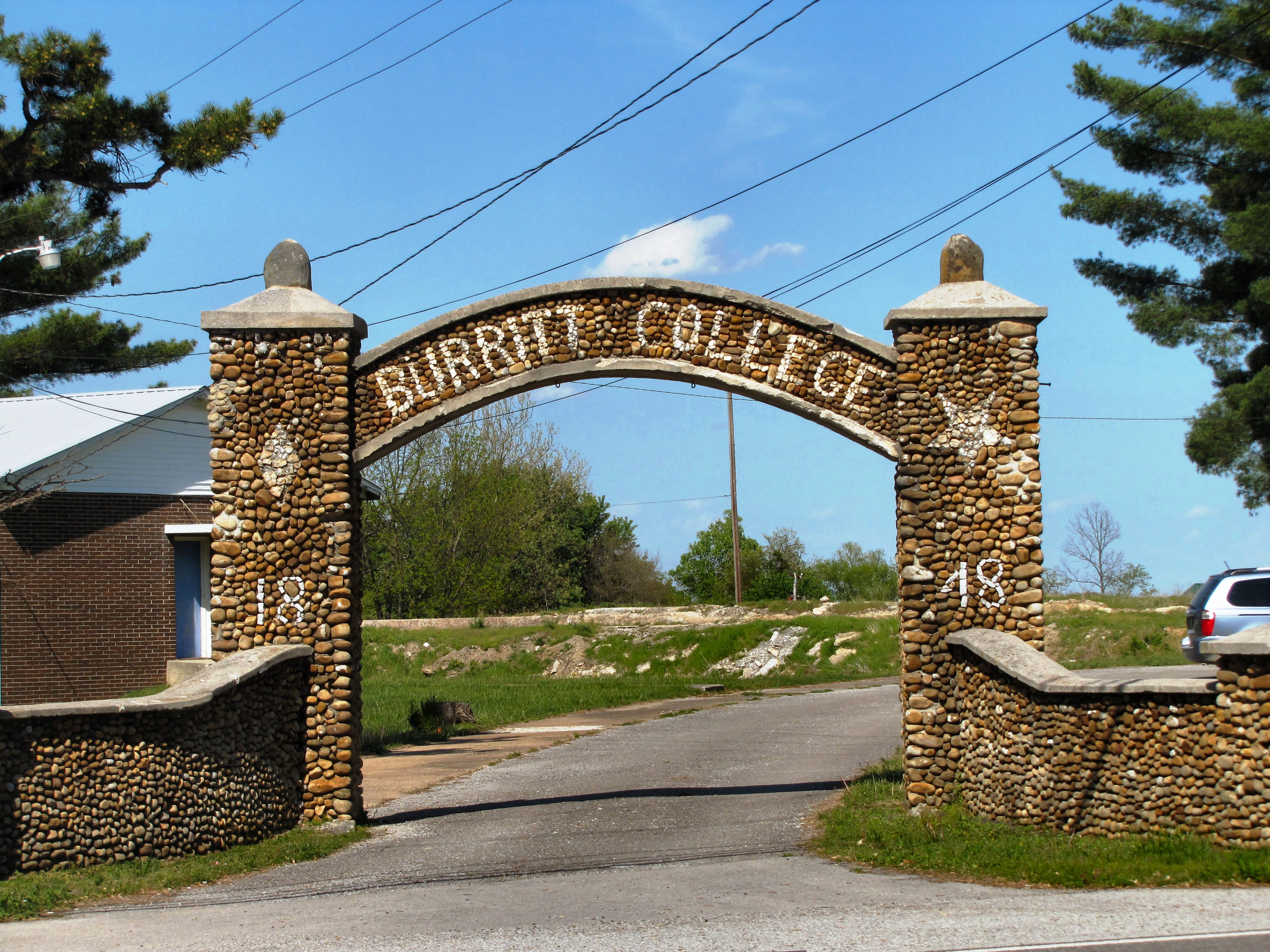
Burritt College entrance gate

It was located in a primarily rural area, and at first an unincorporated area. The town of Spencer wasn't incorporated until 1909. The town lacked railroad access for most of Burritt's history. A catalog for the college from the early 1900s notes that the nearest railroad station was at Doyle, roughly 9 miles (14 km) to the north. The campus's location atop the rugged western Cumberland Plateau affected its culture. A walking trail connected the campus to a cliff at the edge of the Plateau known as "Lover's Leap." Burritt students occasionally took hiking trips to nearby Fall Creek Falls, which they simply called "Big Falls."

The Burritt campus covered around 10 acres at the end of the Civil War, but had expanded to 25 acres by the 1880s. It initially included an administration building, dormitories for men and women, a chapel, and a presidential house. In 1878, the college constructed a new three-story, seventeen-room administration building that featured an 80-foot (24 m) by 50-foot (15 m) recitation hall. After this building burned in 1906, it was replaced by a building of similar size (three stories and eighteen rooms), but lacking exterior adornments. In the 1920s, the college added a two-story, 36-room building known as "Billingsley Hall," a gymnasium, and a new presidential house.

Burritt's rustic stone entrance gate, which contains the college's name and charter date (1848), still stands facing College Street (TN-30) in Spencer. The old administration building is also still standing. The Burritt Alumni Museum and the Burritt Memorial Library, both of which are open to the public, are now located on the former Burritt campus.

== Notable alumni ==
- H. Leo Boles, preacher and academic administrator
- Foster V. Brown, U.S. congressman
- Charles Dickens Clark, U.S. district court judge
- Andrew Jackson Clements, U.S. congressman
- Joe H. Eagle, U.S. congressman
- Thomas A. Kercheval, state legislator and Nashville mayor
- John W. Preston, California state supreme court justice
- Thomas M. Shackleford, Florida state supreme court justice
