= Word and Work =

- Editor: Alex V. Wilson
- Former editors: Robert Henry Boll
- Categories: Churches of Christ
- Frequency: Monthly
- First issue: 1908
- Country: United States
- Language: English
- Website: Word and Work online

Word and Work is a religious journal associated with those Churches of Christ that hold to a premillennial eschatology. It was founded in 1908 by Dr. David Lipscomb Watson.

== History ==
During the period 1912 to 1913, the Word and Work began publishing articles written by Charles M. Neal supporting dispensational millennialism. In 1913 Watson sold the journal to Stanford Chambers, who became the sole editor. Watson, a postmillennialist, was disturbed by the increasing editorial emphasis on premillennialism, and later tried in two unsuccessful lawsuits to regain control of the journal.

Chambers sold Word and Work to Robert Henry Boll in 1916. Boll had been a controversial front page editor of the Gospel Advocate, writing articles on biblical prophecy during his tenure beginning in 1909; he was forced to resign in 1915 as the result of a developing controversy over his millennial views and the importance he placed on biblical prophecy in the study of the Bible. His eschatological focus came into conflict with the church-centered views of other Church of Christ leaders of the time. The reaction to Boll's premillennialism helped to define and solidify the amillennial view among the mainstream of the Churches of Christ. Under Boll's leadership the Word and Work became the journalistic voice for premillennial Churches of Christ. Boll also used the journal to promote foreign mission work.

E. L. Jorgenson and J. R. Clark succeeded Boll as editors when he died in 1956. They were followed by Gordon R. Linscott in 1962, William Robert Heid in 1976 and Alex Wilson in 1986.
