= A. J. Clements =

American politician (1832–1913)

Andrew Jackson Clements
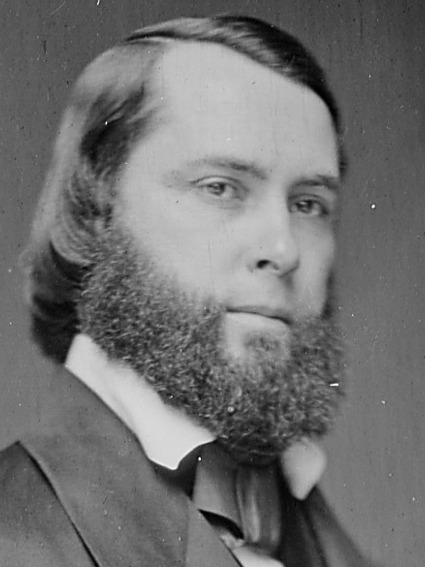

Member of the U.S. House of Representatives from Tennessee's 4th district
- In office March 4, 1861 – March 3, 1863
- Preceded by: William B. Stokes
- Succeeded by: Edmund Cooper

Member of the Tennessee House of Representatives
- In office 1866–67

Personal details
- Born: December 23, 1832 Clementsville, Tennessee, U.S.
- Died: November 7, 1913 (aged 80) Glasgow, Kentucky, U.S.
- Party: Unionist
- Spouses: Nancy Jones Clements; Matilda Harlan Clements
- Children: Mollie Clements; Carlos Clements; Carolyn Clements; Fred Clements
- Education: Burritt College
- Profession: physician; politician

Andrew Jackson Clements (December 23, 1832 – November 7, 1913) was a surgeon and an American politician as a member of the United States House of Representatives for the 4th congressional district of Tennessee.

== Biography ==
Clements was born in Clementsville, Tennessee, in Clay County, son of Christopher Clements and Polly Fraim and grandson of John Clemans (Revolutionary War Veteran) and Eilzabeth Eagle. He attended a private school and Burritt College at Spencer, Tennessee, studied medicine, and commenced practice in Lafayette, Tennessee. His first wife, Nancy Jones Clements died in 1858 and he later married Matilda Harlan by whom he had four children: Mollie, Carlos, Carolyn, and Fred.

== Career ==
During the Civil War, Clements was a surgeon with the First Regiment, Tennessee Mounted Volunteer Infantry (Union).

Elected as a Unionist to the Thirty-seventh Congress, Clements served from March 4, 1861, to March 3, 1863. He was a member of the Tennessee House of Representatives in 1866 and 1867. He resumed the practice of his profession and established a school on his estate for the people of that section of the Cumberland highlands.

== Death ==
Clements died of pneumonia, in Central State Hospital (a mental hospital where he was confined due to senility), Lakeland, Jefferson County, Kentucky, on November 7, 1913 (age 80 years, 319 days). He is interred at Glasgow Municipal Cemetery, Glasgow, Kentucky.

U.S. House of Representatives
Preceded by William B. Stokes	Member of the U.S. House of Representatives from Tennessee's 4th congressional district March 4, 1861 – March 3, 1863	Succeeded by Civil War
