= Lipscomb University =

Christian university in Nashville, Tennessee, US

Coordinates: 36.1058°N 86.7976°W

- Former names: Nashville Bible School (1891–1918); David Lipscomb College (1918–1988)
- Motto: "The Truth Shall Make You Free" – John 8:32
- Type: Private university
- Established: 1891; 135 years ago
- Affiliations: CCCU; NAICU; TICUA
- Religious affiliation: Churches of Christ
- Endowment: $131.9 million (2025)
- Chairman: Richard G. Cowart
- President: Candice McQueen
- Provost: Jennifer W. Shewmaker
- Faculty: 238 (Full-time) & 298 (Part-time)
- Students: 5,646 (Fall 2024)
- Undergraduates: 3,487 (Fall 2024)
- Postgraduates: 2,159 (Fall 2024)
- Location: Nashville, Tennessee, U.S.
- Campus: Suburban, 113 acres (46 ha)
- Colors: Purple & gold
- Nickname: Bisons
- Sporting affiliations: NCAA Division I – A-Sun
- Mascot: Lou the Bison
- Website: www.lipscomb.edu

Lipscomb University is a private Christian university in Nashville, Tennessee, United States. It is affiliated with the Churches of Christ. The campus is located in the Green Hills neighborhood of Nashville; it also maintains one satellite location called "Spark" in Downtown Nashville to serve the business community. Total student enrollment for the fall 2025 semester was 4,549, which included 2,867 undergraduate students and 1,682 graduate students.

== History ==
Lipscomb University was founded in 1891 by David Lipscomb and James A. Harding. The campus grounds consist predominantly of the former estate of David Lipscomb, who donated it to the school. The school was always intended to function as a Christian liberal arts institution. It is still affiliated with the Churches of Christ and a seminary is part of the university.

In an early catalog, the founders expressed their views about providing a liberal education that included Christian underpinning:

We purpose to present in the way of a liberal education as extensive a curriculum as can be found in any school, college, or university in the land, and at the same time to thoroughly drill its students in the Bible, the divine source of wisdom and goodness. It was not our design to make professional preachers, but to train males and females, young and old, all who might become members of the school, for the greatest usefulness in life. Each student is left to choose his own calling.

— James A. Harding, Course Catalog, 1896–97

Several prominent Church of Christ ministers received at least a portion of their higher education here. The university remains thoroughly affiliated in the Churches of Christ: potential full-time, undergraduate faculty must prove their membership in a Church of Christ before being hired.

Its original name was the Nashville Bible School (1891–1918). It became David Lipscomb College in 1918, David Lipscomb University in 1988, and Lipscomb University in 1997. Lipscomb graduated its first senior class in 1948. In 1954, the Southern Association of Colleges and Schools granted Lipscomb its first accreditation. In 1988, Lipscomb attained Level III (master's degree-granting) status and became known as Lipscomb University.

Some academic buildings were built with tax-exempt municipal bonds, and, because Lipscomb is a Christian school, this led to an extended lawsuit on the basis of whether or not a private religious institution is allowed to use public bonds. This case, originally was filed in 1991, was litigated for over a decade. A federal district court ruled against Lipscomb in 2000, but the Sixth Circuit Court of Appeals reversed the decision in 2002. The Supreme Court declined to hear the case in 2003.

In July 2020, Lipscomb launched the Lanier Center for Archaeology funded by alumnus and trustee Mark Lanier. This center carried over faculty from Southwestern Baptist Theological Seminary's dissolved Tandy Institute for Archaeology and offered Lipscomb's first (though not only) Ph.D program.

In September 2020, Lipscomb announced that it would be merging with the Austin Graduate School of Theology in Austin, Texas. The merger would become official in January 2021, with Lipscomb managing all of AGST's affairs and expanding their course offerings. Later, AGST folded due to financial troubles.

In

=== Presidents ===
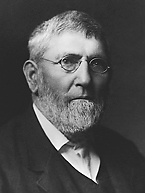
David Lipscomb co-founded the Nashville Bible School in 1891.

There have been 14 superintendents or presidents of Lipscomb over 18 administrations.

- James A. Harding (1891–1901)
- William Anderson (1901–1905)
- J. S. Ward (1905–1906)
- E. A. Elam (1906–1913)
- J. S. Ward (1913)
- H. Leo Boles (1913–1920)
- A. B. Lipscomb (1920–1921)
- H. S. Lipscomb (1921–1923)
- H. Leo Boles (1923–1932)
- Batsell Baxter (1932–1934)
- E. H. Ijams (1934–1943)
- Batsell Baxter (1943–1946)
- Athens Clay Pullias (1946–1977)
- G. Willard Collins (1977–1986)
- Harold Hazelip (1986–1997)
- Steve Flatt (1997–2005)
- L. Randolph Lowry III (2005–2021)
- Candice McQueen (2021–present)

The Nashville Bible School was co-founded in 1891 by college founders David Lipscomb and James A. Harding. David Lipscomb never served as president, but as chairman of the board of trustees. James A. Harding served as the school's first superintendent.

Academic rankings

National
- U.S. News & World Report: 212 of 443
- Washington Monthly: 416 of 442

== Campus ==
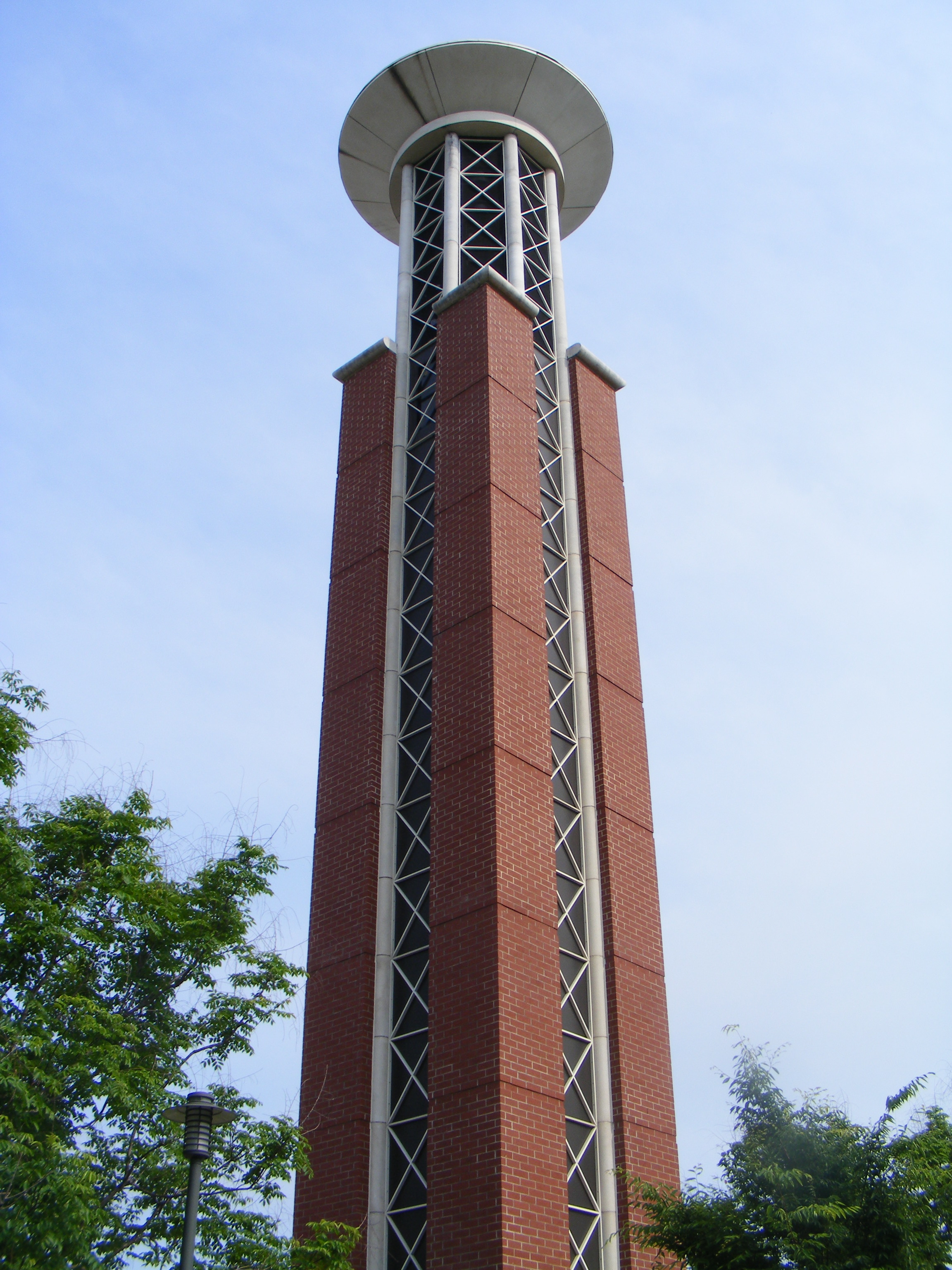
The Allen Bell Tower

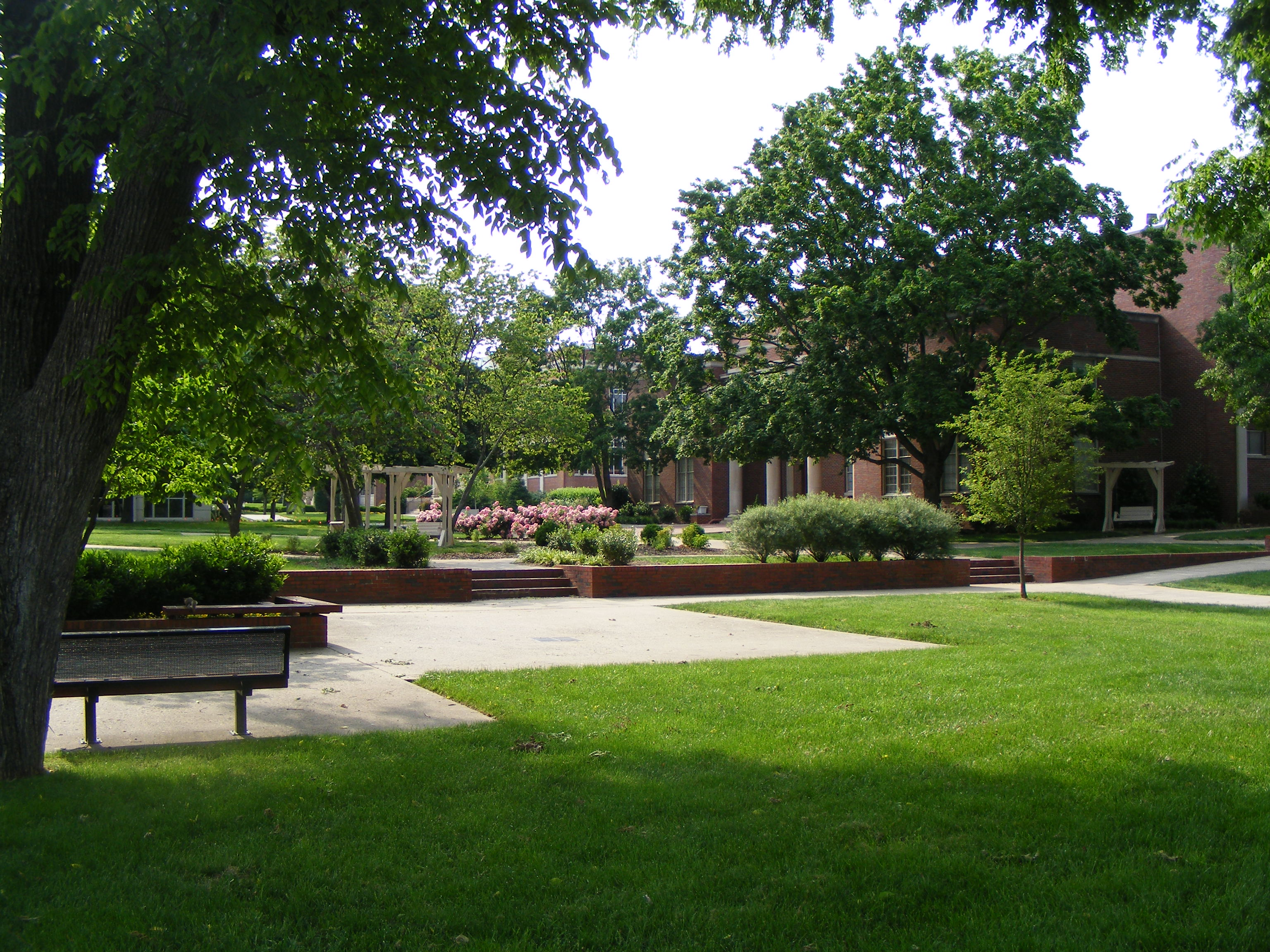
Bison Square

The James D. Hughes Center houses all the university's health-science programs and the physician assistant program. The Nursing and Health Sciences Center next door houses the graduate College of Nursing.

Lipscomb has announced plans for a new College of Business building and a new performing arts center.

== Student life ==
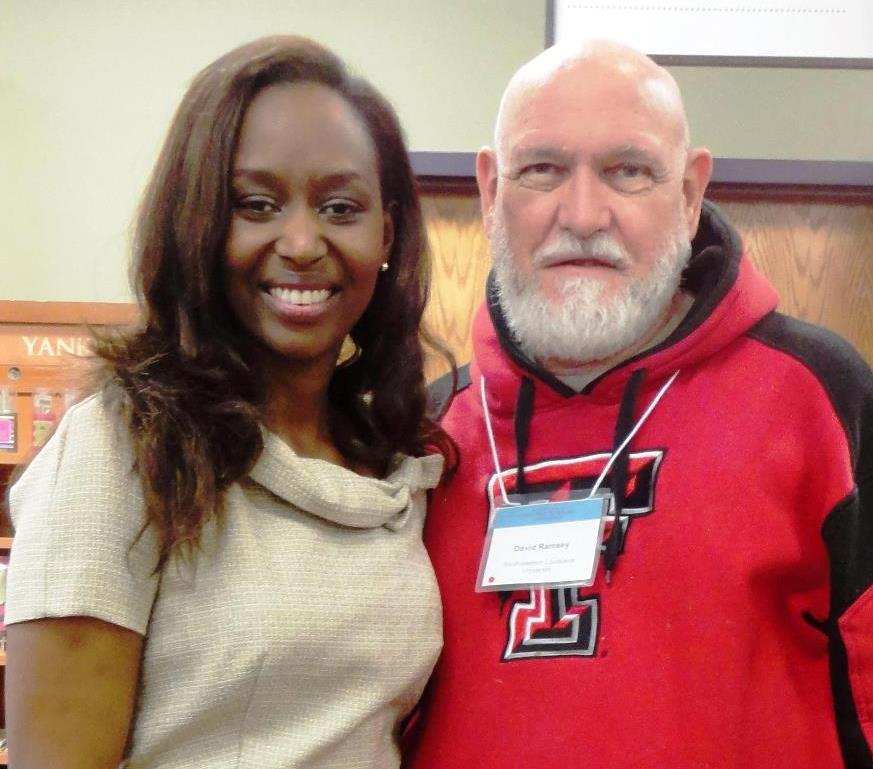
Immaculée Ilibagiza (left), survivor of the Rwandan genocide, at the Christian Scholars' Conference in 2012.

Lipscomb does not have fraternities and sororities. Rather, it has social clubs, which are local and unique to Lipscomb University and are not part of any national Greek system.

The Babbler is the defunct student newspaper and was published weekly during the spring and fall semesters. The title of the publication came from Acts 17:18 which in part says "What does this babbler have to say?" The Backlog is the school's yearbook and is published annually. The Lumination Network, the school's converged student media outlet, replaced the weekly Babbler and is tied heavily with the academic program of the Department of Communication and Journalism. "Lumination Network is Lipscomb University's official student news service." An independent student newsletter, the Lipscomb Underground, provided unfiltered student opinion for the campus. The LU originally ran from 1994 to 2008, resurfacing in 2016, and persisting on Twitter until 2018. The name Lipscomb Underground comes from the musical Les Misérables which in part says "Make for the sewers, go underground!"

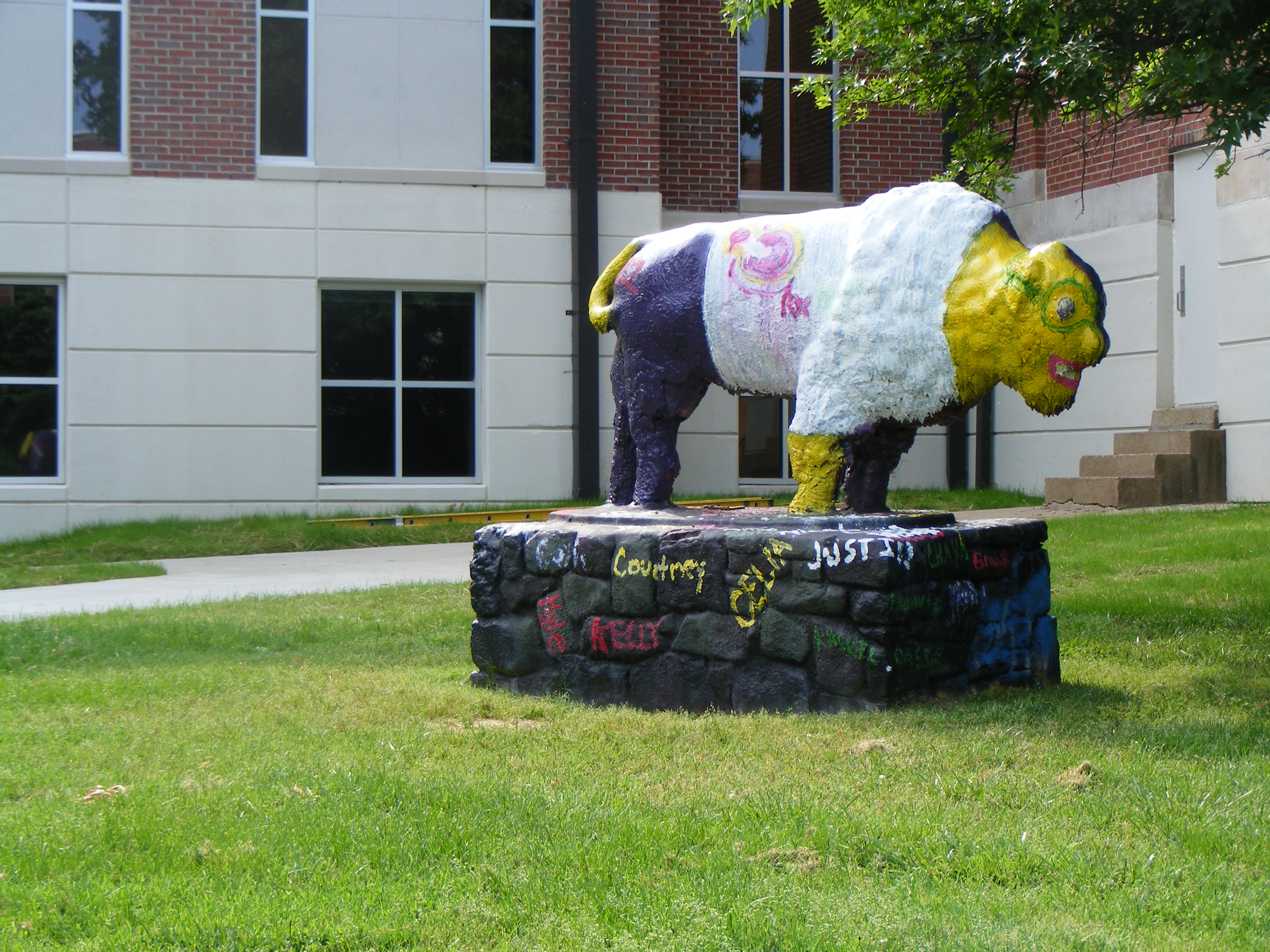
An example of the bison painted by students by Collins Alumni Auditorium

== Student body ==
As of 2023, Lipscomb University had 39% male students and 61% female students.

== Athletics ==
Lipscomb Bisons logo

Lipscomb athletic teams are the Bisons. The university is a member of the Division I level of National Collegiate Athletic Association (NCAA), primarily competing in the ASUN Conference.

Lipscomb competes in 17 intercollegiate varsity sports: men's sports include baseball, basketball, cross country, golf, soccer, tennis and track & field (indoor and outdoor); women's sports include basketball, cross country, golf, soccer, softball, tennis, track & field (indoor and outdoor) and volleyball.

The university has an ongoing sports rivalry with Belmont University, just 3 miles (4.8 km) down the road from Lipscomb. Traditionally, basketball games between the two schools are called the "Battle of the Boulevard". In 2006, the rivalry reached a new level when Belmont and Lipscomb advanced to the finals of the Atlantic Sun tournament at the Memorial Center in Johnson City, Tennessee, with the winner earning its first-ever bid to the NCAA tournament. Belmont won 74–69 in overtime. Lipscomb was invited to the National Invitation Tournament as the regular-season conference champion, "the program's first-ever post-season appearance."

In 2018, Lipscomb made its first ever NCAA tournament appearance, but lost to the University of North Carolina in the first round. In 2019, Lipscomb made the NIT basketball finals, falling to the Texas Longhorns. In 2025, Lipscomb won its second ASUN championship and returned to the NCAA tournament, but lost in the first round to Iowa State.

== Notable alumni ==
=== Academia ===
- Michael F. Adams (1970), retired president of the University of Georgia, former chancellor of Pepperdine University
- William S. Banowsky, fourth president of Pepperdine University
- Richard A. Batey (H.S. 1951, David Lipscomb College 1955), New Testament scholar
- Lee C. Camp (1989), Distinguished Faculty Fellow, Center for Vocational Discovery at Lipscomb University
- Douglas A. Foster (1974), author and scholar known for his work on the history of Stone-Campbell Restoration Movement
- Judy G. Hample (1969), former Chancellor of the Pennsylvania State System of Higher Education (PASSHE)
- David Edwin Harrell (1954), historian at Auburn University
- Candice McQueen, current president of Lipscomb University, past Commissioner of the Tennessee Department of Education
- Howard A. White, fifth president of Pepperdine University
- M. Norvel Young, third president of Pepperdine University

=== Athletics ===
- Casey Bond (2009), actor, former professional baseball player
- Rex Brothers (2011), professional baseball player for the Atlanta Braves
- Caleb Joseph (2010), professional baseball player for the Baltimore Orioles
- Garrison Mathews (2019), professional basketball player for the Houston Rockets
- John Pierce (1994), college basketball all-time/all-division scoring leader with 4,230 points
- Paige Wood (transferred), distance runner, 2022 U.S. Marathon Champion

=== Medicine ===
- J. Ridley Stroop (1921), psychology and biblical professor, known for his interference research in experimental psychology known as the Stroop Effect
- Edwin Trevathan (1977), physician and public health leader, currently director of the Vanderbilt Institute for Global Health, former national center director at the U.S. Centers for Disease Control and Prevention (CDC), former provost at Baylor University.

=== Music and arts ===
- Kelsea Ballerini (2012), country music singer and songwriter
- Pat Boone (H.S. 1952), singer
- John Craton (1977), classical composer
- Jim Jinkins (1975), creator of the animated Doug series
- Dustin Lynch (2007), country music singer and songwriter
- Michael Shane Neal (1991), portrait artist
- NIKI, Indonesian singer and songwriter
- Monty Powell (1984), multiple award-winning country music singer, songwriter and producer
- Thomas Rhett (2011), country music singer and songwriter
- Marty Roe (1984), lead singer of the country music band Diamond Rio
- Ray Walker (1956), bass singer for The Jordanaires quartet

=== Politics ===
- LaMar Baker (1938), former U.S. Representative from TN-03
- David French (1991), (political commentator)
- Beth Harwell (1978), former Tennessee State Representative, first female Speaker of the Tennessee House of Representatives, candidate for governor of Tennessee in the 2018 election
- James Lomax, member of the Alabama House of Representatives
- Kerry Roberts (1983), Tennessee State Senator
- David Sampson (1978), former United States Deputy Secretary of Commerce
- William R. Snodgrass (1942), former Tennessee Comptroller of the Treasury
- Jason C. Stephens, Speaker of the Ohio House of Representatives, State Representative from Ohio's 93rd house district,

=== Religion ===
- Robert Henry Boll, German-born American preacher in the Churches of Christ
- Charles R. Brewer (1918), professor, preacher, poet, and leader
- G. C. Brewer (1911), author, preacher, and teacher
- B.C. Goodpasture (1918), preacher and writer
- George Eulan Howard, 1958 Head of Dept. of Religion University of Georgia, New Testament scholar, author
- Ira L. North (1941), preacher and author

=== Other ===
- Cyntoia Brown (2015), a woman whose murder conviction at age 16 was a national controversy; she was granted clemency in 2019
- Savannah Chrisley, reality television personality and pageant queen
- W. Mark Lanier (1981), founder of The Lanier Law Firm, and trustee of Lipscomb
- Barry Stowe (1979), CEO, Jackson National Life
- Drew Talbert, social media influencer
