= Austin McGary =

- Born: February 6, 1846; Hunstville, Texas
- Died: June 15, 1928 (aged 82); Houston, Texas
- Burial place: Oakwood Cemetery, Huntsville, Texas, United States
- Occupations: Soldier, Lawman, Evangelist
- Military career
- Allegiance: Confederate States of America
- Branch: Brown's Regiment, Texas Cavalry
- Service: 1863–1865 (2 years)
- Wars: American Civil War

Austin McGary (February 6, 1846 – June 15, 1928) was an American Restoration Movement evangelist and publisher of a periodical entitled Firm Foundation, which was first published on September 1, 1884.

Born in Huntsville, Texas, to Isaac and Elizabeth (Visier) McGary, McGary's father was said to have fought at the Battle of San Jacinto and to have guarded the recently captured Antonio López de Santa Anna. McGary's mother died while McGary was a child.

== Texas lawman ==
Before becoming an evangelist, McGary was elected sheriff of Madison County, Texas, a post he held for two years before resigning to work for the state of Texas in transporting prisoners to penitentiaries. This work took place near the United States-Mexico border.

== Personal life ==
McGary was married three times—to Narcissus Jenkins in 1866 (two children) until her death in 1872, Lucy Bettie Kittrell in 1875 (nine children) until her death in 1897, and finally to Lillian Otey.

== Evangelist, publisher, debater ==
McGary became interested in religion and studied the Alexander Campbell - Robert Owen debate of 1829. He was said to have been educated in part by Church of Christ ministers including Benton, Thomas, and Basil Sweeney.

McGary was converted to the Churches of Christ and baptized by Harry Hamilton after hearing sermons by the latter in Madisonville, Texas. The baptism took place on December 24, 1881.

He began publication of the Firm Foundation in 1884, in his own words:

"to oppose everything in the work and worship of the church, for which there was not a command or an apostolic example or a necessary scriptural inference."

== Rebaptism controversy ==
In debates with David Lipscomb, editor of the rival publication Gospel Advocate, McGary advanced positions regarding the relationship between baptism and salvation, some of which were already seminal in the formation of the group of Christian churches known as the Churches of Christ, others of which would become the basis for continuing disagreement among members of that body.

The substance of McGary's argument was based on the notion, generally accepted by members of the Churches of Christ, that the state of human salvation begins at the moment of that individual's baptism. McGary, however, further asserted that another condition of salvation lay in the believer's knowledge and acceptance of this idea (of baptism securing the remission of sins) at the moment of baptism, concluding that baptisms occurring outside of this condition were invalid, and did not bring about the salvation of those baptised in the absence of that state of belief. Lipscomb took the opposite position: that baptism for any scriptural reason qualified as scriptural baptism, independent of the candidate's full knowledge and acceptance of that concept. McGary's position was often dubbed "The Texas Heresy" by its detractors.

The extent of the re-baptism controversy and McGary's role in it are evident in various essays in David W. Fletcher's edited 432-page collection of essays Baptism and the remission of sins: A historical perspective published in 1990. By the late 1930s the McGary position came to dominate American Churches of Christ in all but Middle Tennessee (the area most under Lipscomb's continued influence), but the Lipscomb view has since become more popular in some elements of the fellowship nationally.

== Later life ==
After resigning the editorship of the Firm Foundation in 1902, McGary lived in California and then in Oregon before returning to live in Texas.

Other later periodicals published by McGary included The Lookout and The Open Arena.
