= H. Leo Boles =

American preacher and academic administrator

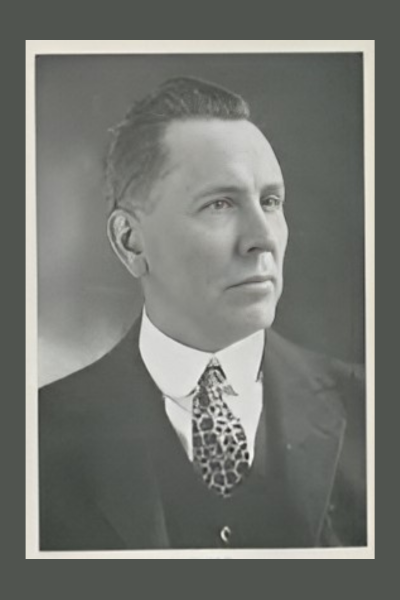

President of Lipscomb University
- In office 1913–1920
- In office 1923–1932

Personal details
- Born: February 22, 1874 Gainesboro, Tennessee, U.S.
- Died: February 7, 1946 (aged 71) Nashville, Tennessee, U.S.
- Education: Burritt College; Nashville Bible School; Vanderbilt University; Southern School of Divinity

H. Leo Boles (February 22, 1874 – February 7, 1946) was an American preacher and academic administrator. He was a minister of the Churches of Christ and the president of David Lipscomb College (now known as Lipscomb University). He was the author of several books.

== Early life and education ==
Boles was born on February 22, 1874, in Gainesboro, Tennessee. His maternal grandfather, John Smith, was a leader in the Restoration Movement. He had 17 siblings.

Boles graduated from Burritt College, where he earned a bachelor of science degree in 1900. He attended the Nashville Bible School, later known as Lipscomb University, where he earned a bachelor of arts degree in 1906. He earned a master's degree from Burritt College in 1913, followed by a second master's degree from Vanderbilt University. He earned a PhD from the Southern School of Divinity in Fort Worth, Texas in 1927.

== Career ==
Boles began his career as a schoolteacher in Texas. He was also a preacher of the Churches of Christ.

Boles taught at David Lipscomb College (now known as Lipscomb University) from 1906 until his retirement. He taught "Religious Education, Sociology, Psychology, Philosophy and the Bible." He was the head of the Bible department for more than two decades. He served as the university president twice: first from 1913 to 1920, and a second time from 1923 to 1932. He was a pacifist, and he urged students not to serve in World War I.

Boles was a member of the International Council of Religious Education and Uniform Lessons Committee. He was the editor of the Gospel Advocate from 1920 to 1923. He authored several books.

== Personal life and death ==
Boles married Ida May Meiser in 1906. They had a son, Leo Lipscomb Boles, and they resided at 4100 Granny White Pike in Nashville. Boles was an elder of the Reid Avenue Church of Christ and the 12th Avenue Church of Christ.

Boles died on February 7, 1946, in Nashville. He was buried at Woodlawn Memorial Park.

== Selected works ==
- Boles, H. Leo (1923). The New Testament Teaching on War. Nashville, Tennessee: Gospel Advocate Co. ISBN 9780313233128. OCLC 12268377.
- Boles, H. Leo (1963). A commentary on the Gospel According to Matthew. Nashville, Tennessee: Gospel Advocate Co.
- Boles, H. Leo (1940). A commentary on the Gospel by Luke. Nashville, Tennessee: Gospel Advocate Co. ISBN 9780313233128. OCLC 2928639.
- Boles, H. Leo (1953). Goodpasture, B. C. (ed.). The sermon outlines of H. Leo Boles. Nashville, Tennessee: B.C. Goodpasture Publisher. OCLC 81056148.
