= John Thomas Hinds =

American preacher (1866–1938)

John T. Hinds
- Born: John Thomas Hinds; 1866
- Died: January 1, 1938 (aged 71–72); Rogers, Arkansas
- Burial place: Evergreen Cemetery (Fayetteville, Arkansas)
- Occupations: Evangelist and Editor

John Thomas Hinds (1866 – January 1, 1938) was an American gospel preacher, teacher and evangelist for the Churches of Christ.

From 1934 until his death in 1938 he was the editor of the Gospel Advocate in Nashville, Tennessee. A year before his death in 1937, he published his own commentary on the Book of Revelation. He was a pastor of the Rogers Church of Christ in Rogers, Arkansas.

Hinds had a stroke in the summer of 1938 and never fully recovered. Hinds died at his home near Rogers, Arkansas, on January 1, 1938. He is buried in the Evergreen Cemetery in Fayetteville, Arkansas.

He was married and had two children.

Preceded by Foy E. Wallace	Editor of the Gospel Advocate; 1934–1938	Succeeded by B. C. Goodpasture
