= James A. Harding =

American university president and religious leader

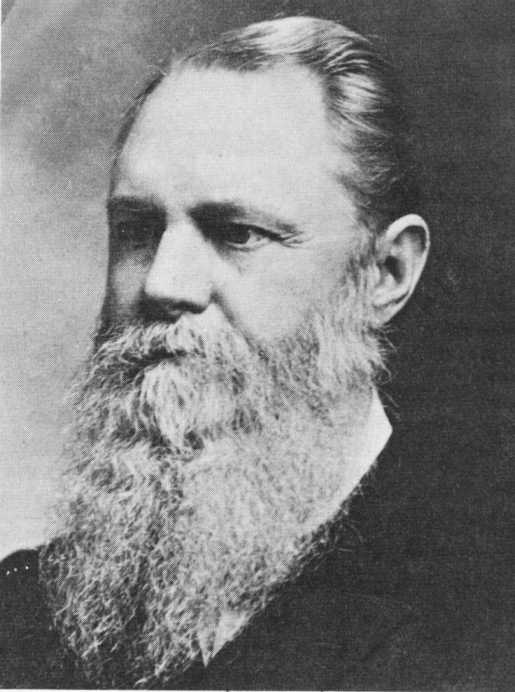
James A. Harding

James Alexander Harding (March 16, 1848 - May 28, 1922) was an early influential leader in the Churches of Christ.

Harding helped David Lipscomb, another leader in the Churches of Christ, begin Nashville Bible School, now known as Lipscomb University in Nashville, Tennessee. Harding was the first president of the school, serving from 1891 to 1901.

Several schools are named after Harding including Harding University and Harding Academy in Searcy, Arkansas; and Harding Academy and Harding School of Theology in Memphis, Tennessee.
