= David Lipscomb =

Leader, American Restoration Movement (1831–1917)

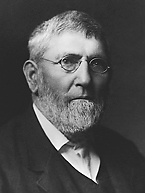
- Born: January 21, 1831; Huntland, Tennessee, U.S.
- Died: November 11, 1917 (aged 86); Nashville, Tennessee, U.S.
- Known for: Founded the Nashville Bible School, which is now known as Lipscomb University
- Movement: American Restoration Movement

David Lipscomb (January 21, 1831 – November 11, 1917) was a minister, editor, and educator in the American Restoration Movement and one of the leaders of that movement, which, by 1906, had formalized a division into the Church of Christ (with which Lipscomb was affiliated) and the Christian Church (Disciples of Christ). James A. Harding and David Lipscomb founded the Nashville Bible School, now known as Lipscomb University in honor of the latter.

== Personal life ==
Lipscomb was born to Granville Lipscomb (born January 13, 1802, in Louisa County, Virginia, died November 16, 1853) and his second wife Ann E. Lipscomb (born January 25, 1799, in Louisa County, Virginia, died January 29, 1835, in Illinois) (called "Nancy" in some sources). Granville had previously been married, on December 14, 1825, in Spotsylvania, Virginia, to the former Ellen Guerner.

Granville and his older brother William Lipscomb were active in the Bean's Creek Baptist Church, where they were listed as the church clerks for 1828–1831 (Granville Lipscomb) and 1844–1876 (William C. Lipscomb). Attempts to convert the Bean's Creek church to Restoration Movement theology were poorly received, and Granville Lipscomb's family was expelled in 1831. David Lipscomb was born in Huntland, Tennessee.

The Lipscomb family, originally Baptist, were said to have converted to Restoration Movement Christianity in the mid-1820s while reading Alexander Campbell's periodical Christian Baptist, copies of which had been sent to the Lipscomb's family by Ann's sister Elizabeth (born ca. 1797) and brother-in-law, physician Lunsford Lindsay (born ca. 1793) of Todd County, Kentucky, who would later participate in the formation of the Cadiz Christian Church in 1837.

The Lipscombs were said to be charter members of the Old Salem church, according to Earl Irvin West's Lipscomb biography, The Life and Times of David Lipscomb.

The Old Salem congregation began in May 1834 with two male members and two females. Also, five colored people belonged. By Christmas that year the number had grown to thirty-four whites and twelve blacks.

The Lipscomb family moved to Illinois in 1834 for the purpose of freeing their slaves. David's mother Ann, along with three of his siblings, died of a fever in 1835 while they were still in Illinois. When Lipscomb's father returned to Tennessee "he accepted slavery under protest as a necessary evil." Some time after 1849 David Lipscomb "owned a good farm, a few negroes, and enough stock and fixtures of all kinds to carry on his business as a farmer." Lipscomb founded Lipscomb University as a segregated educational institution that refused to accept African-American students well into the late 1960s. Despite owning slaves and founding a segregated school, David always believed that racial divisions in the church are inconsistent with Christianity.

Lipscomb's father moved the rest of the family back to Tennessee in 1835 or 1836 and he married his third wife, Jane L. Breedan (died September 8, 1885), on April 11 or August 11, 1837. David's half-brother, also named Granville, was born to Jane Breedan Lipscomb. William Lipscomb would help to found Neely's Bend Church of Christ in April 1872 . Granville Lipscomb Jr. would become a leader in the Lebanon Church of Christ founded in 1879 in Weakley County, Tennessee.

Lipscomb was married to Margaret Zellner on July 22, 1862. Only one child was born to them. Little Zellner died at the age of 9 months of dehydration while teething. They reared, however, several foster children. David Lipscomb died on November 11, 1917, at the age of 86 years. Funeral services were held in the College Street Church, where he had been an elder for many years.

== Tolbert Fanning and Franklin College ==
David Lipscomb (1831–1917)

Lipscomb, along with his older brother William, was greatly influenced by Nashville, Tennessee, church leader Tolbert Fanning. Lipscomb was baptized by Fanning in 1845. He entered Fanning's Franklin College in 1846, graduating in 1849. While a student at Franklin, Lipscomb roomed with the father of Edward Ward Carmack.

Fanning was an enforcer of strict orthodoxy with regard to Restoration doctrines, seeing anything not specifically authorized by the New Testament as unnecessary and hence sinful addition to the "primitive" Christianity of the 1st century, which the movement was by definition dedicated to restoring.

== Gospel Advocate ==
In this spirit, in 1855, Fanning and William Lipscomb began publishing a magazine aimed at dissemination of this view throughout the Restoration Movement, the Gospel Advocate. Following the resumption of mail service, which had been interrupted by the American Civil War, David Lipscomb revived the Gospel Advocate in July 1866, with himself and Fanning as editors: Fanning withdrew making Lipscomb the sole editor until he was joined by P. S. Fall, John T. Walsh, Jacob Creath Jr., T. W. Brents, and Carroll Kendrick in 1867.

Although the Advocate has always been conservative and Bible based, the "tone and direction" has varied as editors have changed. When David Lipscomb was the editor, the focus was on seeking unity by following scripture exactly, and the Advocate's editorial position was to reject anything that is not explicitly allowed by scripture. When Foy E. Wallace was editor the Advocate fought against dispensational premillennialism. Editor B. C. Goodpasture used the Advocate to oppose the "non-institutional" view within the Churches of Christ. Despite these differences in editorial focus, throughout its entire history the Advocate has consistently sought to promote Christianity based on New Testament precedents.

== Views on war and government ==
All the wars and strifes between tribes, races, nations, from the beginning until now, have been the result of man's effort to govern himself and the world, rather than to submit to the government of God.

— David Lipscomb, On Civil Government p. 14

Lipscomb was deeply affected by the American Civil War, which prompted him to reevaluate his beliefs concerning the relationship between Christians and government. He shifted from being a strong supporter of American democracy to a more "Mennonite-like" view, no longer believing that Christians should participate in war or actively participate in government. The distinction between the kingdom of God and the kingdom of the world became central to his thinking. Lipscomb expressed these views during the war in the Gospel Advocate and after the war in a book titled Civil Government. Because he actively opposed the participation of Christians in war, he was often viewed as a traitor to the Confederate States of America and later to the United States. Lipscomb did believe the war had served a positive purpose by freeing the slaves, although he challenged the American Christian Missionary Society's support of the war.

Every one who honors and serves the human government and relies upon it, for good, more than he does upon the Divine government, worships and serves the creature more than he does the Creator.

— David Lipscomb, On Civil Government p.50

The radical libertarian scholar Edward Stringham has argued that Lipscomb had independently questioned common assumptions such as these:

1. Governments need to make laws.
2. Governments are created for the public good.
3. Democracy is for the common good.

Stringham further describes Lipscomb's beliefs as follows:

1. Governments may seek to increase disorder to expand their power.
2. People should abstain from voting, instead seeking change through persuasive and non-coercive methods.
3. Peaceful civilization is not dependent on the state.
4. Governments are created for the benefit of the rulers, not the people.

== Nashville Bible School ==
Lipscomb for a time was a prosperous farmer in addition to his religious activities, at one time operating his own ferry across the Cumberland River from his farm north of Nashville to the side of the river on which the main part of the city was located. He eventually relocated to an estate south of Nashville. Today, this estate is the campus of Lipscomb University. The log house in which he lived on his former farm has been dismantled and re-erected adjacent to his later home, which is used by the university for some social occasions.

In 1891, Lipscomb and James A. Harding founded the Nashville Bible School, the precursor to the current Lipscomb University, which was not named for him until after his death. As Lipscomb was a product of the predominant Southern culture of the time, this institution was segregated and was for many years solely for white students, necessitating a separate sister institution in North Nashville for black students, which was not totally dismantled and merged with the larger white school until the 1960s.

== Opposition to missionary societies and instrumental music ==
Neither Paul nor any other apostle, nor the Lord Jesus, nor any of the disciples for five hundred years, used instruments. This too, in the face of the fact that the Jews had used instruments in the days of their prosperity and that the Greeks and heathen nations all used them in their worship. They were dropped out with such emphasis that they were not taken up till the middle of the Dark Ages, and came in as part of the order of the Roman Catholic Church. It seems there cannot be doubt but that the use of instrumental music in connection with the worship of God, whether used as a part of the worship or as an attraction accompaniment, is unauthorized by God and violates the oft-repeated prohibition to add nothing to, take nothing from, the commandments of the Lord. They have not been authorized by God or sanctified with the blood of his Son.

— David Lipscomb, Queries and Answers

Lipscomb, along with his mentor Tolbert Fanning, opposed the newly formed American Christian Missionary Society. No disagreement existed over the need for evangelism, but many believed that missionary societies were not authorized by scripture and would compromise the autonomy of local congregations. The use of musical instruments in worship had been discussed in journal articles as early as 1849, and initial reactions were generally unfavorable. However, some congregations are known to have been using musical instruments in the 1850s and 1860s. Both acceptance of instruments and discussion of the issue grew after the American Civil War. Opponents argued that the New Testament provided no authorization for their use in worship, whereas supporters argued on the basis of expediency and Christian liberty. Affluent, urban congregations were more likely to adopt musical instruments, while poorer and more rural congregations tended to see them as "an accommodation to the ways of the world." Although Lipscomb was slow to come to a decision on the issue, articulating his final position in 1878, he came firmly to oppose the use of musical instruments in worship. One biographer describes Lipscomb as taking "a firm stand against the organization of human societies for the preaching of the gospel, and he as ably contended for the simple worship without the use of instrumental music, as taught in the New Testament."

A deeper theological concern for Lipscomb was the adoption of German liberal theology by many among the Disciples wing of the Restoration Movement. He perceived them as taking a direction very incompatible with the principles enunciated by Thomas and Alexander Campbell.

As the 19th century progressed, a division gradually developed between those whose primary commitment was to unity, and those whose primary commitment was to the restoration of the primitive church. Those whose primary focus was unity gradually took on "an explicitly ecumenical agenda" and "sloughed off the restorationist vision." This group increasingly used the terms "Disciples of Christ" and "Christian Churches" rather than "Churches of Christ." At the same time, those whose primary focus was restoration of the primitive church increasingly used the term "Churches of Christ" rather than "Disciples of Christ." Lipscomb served as a moderate among those with conservative views, to the extent that Austin McGary described him as liberal, and he was more inclusive than either McGary or Daniel Sommer. But in 1906 Lipscomb answered the director of the U.S. religious census for the conservatives when they were asked if the Disciples of Christ were divided, to the effect that they were. In the religious census of 1906 some confusion pervaded the data as some who supported the missionary societies and instrumental music reported themselves as in the Churches of Christ and some who opposed the innovations still considered themselves Disciples of Christ.

== Churches of Christ ==
Nothing in life has given me more pain in heart than the separation from those I have heretofore worked with and loved.

— David Lipscomb, 1899

Thus in 1906, the U.S. Religious Census listed the Christian Churches and the Churches of Christ as separate and distinct groups for the first time. This, however, was simply the recognition of a division that had been growing for years, with published reports as early as 1883. The most obvious distinction between the two groups was the rejection of musical instruments in the Churches of Christ. The controversy over musical instruments began in 1860 with the introduction of organs in some churches. More basic were differences in the underlying approach to Biblical interpretation. For the Churches of Christ, any practices not present in accounts of New Testament worship were not permissible in the church, and they could find no New Testament documentation of the use of instrumental music in worship. For the Christian Churches (Disciples of Christ), any practices not expressly forbidden could be considered.

After the division Disciples churches used "Christian Church" as the dominant designation for congregations. The approach to missionary work and the presence or absence of mechanical instruments were the most visible issues, but some deeper, underlying ones were inextricable from those issues. The process that led to the separation had begun prior to the American Civil War. In sum, for a movement based on Christian unity based on the Bible, one side went in the direction of unity and the other side went in the direction of Restorationism.

== Legacy ==
According to The Encyclopedia of the Stone-Campbell Movement, Lipscomb's "greatest contributions came through the Nashville Bible School, the Gospel Advocate, and his other writings." The Nashville Bible School is now Lipscomb University.

The Gospel Advocate has long been very influential in the Churches of Christ and was, during much of the twentieth century, the most influential journal within the brotherhood, helping to shape consensus views. As the Churches of Christ have no denominational hierarchy, through much of its history the views of the brotherhood have been heavily influenced by its journals and their editors (although an argument can be made that since the 1980s lectureship speakers and university leaders have tended to have more influence than editors).

== Bibliography ==
- Civil Government: Its Origin, Mission, and Destiny, and the Christian's Relation to It. 1866–67. Originally published as a series of articles in the Gospel Advocate from 1866 to 1867, then as a series of articles in the Christian Quarterly from 1888 to 1889, and finally collected in book form by Gospel Advocate Publishing in 1889.
  - Reprinted by McQuiddy Printing, Nashville, 1913. Complete e-text in various formats or Complete HTML e-text.
  - Reprinted by Doulos Christou Press, Indianapolis, 2006, as On Civil Government: Its Origin, Mission, and Destiny, and the Christian's Relation to It. ISBN 0-9744796-1-6 ISBN 978-0-9744796-1-3
  - Reprinted by Wipf & Stock, Eugene, 2011, as On Civil Government: Its Origin, Mission, and Destiny, and the Christian's Relation to It. ISBN 1-61097-873-0 ISBN 978-1610978736

== See also ==
- Christian pacifism

Preceded by Tolbert Fanning	Editor of the Gospel Advocate; 1866–1908	Succeeded by Robert Henry Boll
