= Daniel Sommer =

American religious leader (1850 - 1940)

Daniel Sommer (1850–1940) was an American religious leader who was a key figure in the Restoration Movement and in the separation of the Churches of Christ from the Christian Church.

The roots of the division that led the Churches of Christ to consider itself separate and distinct from the Christian Church were both secular and spiritual. The American Civil War divided the pro-slavery Southern churches from the anti-slavery northern churches in sentiment. After the war the wound was not healed and spiritual issues became the focus that made the division a reality.

== Conversion ==
Sommer's conversion to the Churches of Christ occurred long before the formal division from the Disciples of Christ in 1906, so that references to the Churches of Christ in this section must be understood to refer to the older, larger body.

Born in Queen Anne, Maryland, and raised as only a nominal Lutheran by German immigrants, Sommer had identified himself as a Methodist in 1864. His conversion to Restoration Movement Christianity began in 1868 in Harford County, Maryland under the influence of his employer, John Dallas Everett. He was baptised after being inspired by a gospel meeting presided over by elder T. A. Crenshaw. It was said that in 1869 while enrolled at Bethany College in West Virginia, Sommer began his emphasis on doctrinal conservatism. One biographer, Larry Miles, put it thus: "It was while a student at Bethany that Sommer began what others would call being a "watchdog" for the brotherhood. If he saw, what he deemed a deviation from the apostolic order he felt compelled to attack it." In 1871 he met and came under the influence of conservative Restoration Movement figure Benjamin Franklin after receiving permission from the College to spend time with Franklin at a series of gospel meetings Franklin was holding in Wellsburg, West Virginia.

Daniel Sommer himself spoke out against what he called "innovations" and included on that list things like para-church societies, Bible colleges, the "pastor" system and instrumental music. At the same time he was impatient with others who opposed other "innovations" like the Sunday school and multiple cups for communion.

== The Sand Creek Address and Declaration (1889) ==
Sommer pushed for a division between the Churches of Christ and the Christian Church and when it took place celebrated by saying, "The Church of Christ will be entirely separated from the Christian Church. Hallelujah!"

The date of the beginning of the actual division was Sunday, August 18, 1889. The place was Sand Creek, Illinois, where Sommer delivered what he called "An Address and Declaration, " drawing its title from the Declaration and Address of Thomas Campbell. At its close Sommer said,

"In closing up this address and declaration, we state that we are impelled from a sense of duty to say, that all such innovations and corruptions to which we have referred, that after being admonished, and having had sufficient time for reflection, if they do not turn away from such abominations, that we can not and will not regard them as brethren."

== Success and schism ==
The division was completed by 1906 when the US Census Bureau asked David Lipscomb if the Churches of Christ should be listed separately in the Bureau's report and Lipscomb responded affirmatively.

== Later appeals for reconciliation ==
Although Daniel Sommer argued for division early in his life as he grew older he worked for reconciliation among Churches of Christ and maintained many personal relationships with those in the Christian Church and other brethren.

== Legacy ==
It is fair today to say that none of the major Restoration Movement groups willingly embrace Sommer as a primarily positive figure in their background. The independent Christian churches and the Christian Church (Disciples of Christ) certainly do not since it was largely through his efforts that formal division came. But even in Churches of Christ the name of Daniel Sommer is now most often cited in a negative context to condemn divisive behavior.

== Sources ==
1. Wallace, William E. compiler Daniel Sommer, 1850-1940, A Biography, 1969.

2. Morrison, Matthew C. Like A Lion, Daniel Sommer's Seventy Years of Preaching, DeHoff Publications, 1975.
