= Edwin Trevathan =

American physician

Edwin Trevathan, an American child neurologist, pediatrician, epidemiologist, is the Amos Christie Chair in Global Health, Professor of Pediatrics and Neurology and Director of the Vanderbilt Institute for Global Health, Vanderbilt University Medical Center. He previously served as executive vice president and provost at Baylor University, following his work at the Saint Louis University College for Public Health and Social Justice, where he was dean and professor of epidemiology, pediatrics, and neurology. Previously he was director of the National Center on Birth Defects and Developmental Disabilities at the US Centers for Disease Control and Prevention (CDC) in Atlanta, Georgia. Before joining CDC in 2007, Trevathan was professor of neurology and pediatrics, as well as director of the Division of Pediatric & Developmental Neurology, at Washington University School of Medicine and was neurologist-in-chief at St. Louis Children's Hospital.

== Early career ==
As an Epidemic Intelligence Service officer at CDC in the late 1980s, Trevathan chaired an international committee of experts in child neurology, genetics, and developmental pediatrics who defined the diagnostic criteria for a then new neurogenetic disorder, Rett syndrome. In his early years at CDC, he also helped develop public health surveillance systems for developmental disabilities, and established the first major surveillance system for childhood epilepsy. After his training and service as an EIS officer, Trevathan entered private practice child neurology and was a founding partner in Child Neurology Associates in Atlanta, where he established and directed a comprehensive children's epilepsy center at Scottish Rite Children's Hospital - now part of Children's Healthcare of Atlanta.

In 1995, Trevathan returned to academic medicine as the director of the comprehensive epilepsy program and the associate director of the neurology service at the University of Kentucky College of Medicine. In 1998, he was recruited to Washington University in St. Louis School of Medicine and to St. Louis Children's Hospital, where he was a professor and directed the Pediatric Epilepsy Center, which grew to become one of the largest epilepsy centers dedicated to the care of children in the US. In 2004, Trevathan was appointed director of the Division of Pediatric and Developmental Neurology at Washington University School of Medicine, and neurologist-in-chief at St. Louis Children's Hospital. During Trevathan's tenure, the child neurology training program at Washington University and St. Louis Children's Hospital grew to be one of the largest in the US, and the number of child neurology faculty grew to 22 full-time neurologists.

== Centers for Disease Control and Prevention (2007-2010) ==
From 2007 to 2010, Trevathan was a member of the senior leadership team at the CDC, and director of the National Center on Birth Defects and Developmental Disabilities (NCBDDD). While director of NCBDDD/CDC Trevathan supervised many of CDC's activities related to infant and child health, genetics, neurodevelopmental disorders, disabilities, and blood disorders. NCBDDD's programs include public health surveillance, research, and prevention activities related congenital heart defects, nervous system malformations (e.g. spina bifida and hydrocephalus), hemophilia, sickle cell anemia, deep vein thrombosis and pulmonary embolism, cerebral palsy, autism, health promotion among adults with disability, and early diagnosis of genetic, metabolic and developmental disorders. Trevathan also served as the strategic lead for the CDC response to the 2009 H1N1 influenza pandemic, which disproportionately impacted pregnant women, children, and children with neurological disabilities. He represented CDC on several national committees such as the National Children's Study Federal Advisory Committee member, the Interagency Autism Coordinating Committee, and the Muscular Dystrophy Coordinating Committee.

== College for Public Health & Social Justice, Saint Louis University (2010-2015) ==
In 2010 Trevathan returned to St. Louis to serve as dean of the School of Public Health at Saint Louis University (SLU). Trevathan started as dean two years after almost half the school's faculty left the university when the school's previous dean, Connie Evashwick, was fired for attempting to move the SLU School of Public Health to Washington University in St. Louis; Dr. Evashwick later unsuccessfully sued SLU for sexual discrimination. With support from the SLU president, Lawrence Biondi, Trevathan led a major expansion of the School of Public Health with over 30 new faculty positions, and then in 2012 the formation of the new College for Public Health and Social Justice, which included the SLU School of Social Work. As the only accredited public health college among the one hundred seventy-two Jesuit universities throughout the world, Trevathan led an expansion of the college's global health programs, including a Masters of Public Health (MPH) concentration in global health, establishment of public health educational programs at SLU's campus in Madrid, Spain, and expansion of global health research activities.

== Baylor University (2015-2016) ==
Baylor University recruited Trevathan to serve as Executive Vice President and Provost, or chief academic officer, working under Chancellor Kenneth W. Starr (Baylor University President, 2010–2016). In spite of their obvious differences, Starr (a partisan Republican and lawyer) and Trevathan (a physician-scientist and Democrat), initially found a common passion in expanding high quality research and graduate education at the nation's largest Baptist university. Trevathan resigned as executive vice president and provost in early 2016, amid resistance apparently by President Starr to Trevathan's call for a more diverse and inclusive faculty as an essential component to Baylor's rise as a national research university, and as the university's leadership attention drifted away from expanding research and graduate education to focus on the problems with the football program. A few months after Trevathan stepped down as executive vice president and provost, Ken Starr was fired as Baylor University's president amid controversy.

In public Trevathan has been vague regarding the reasons for his leaving Baylor, but in an interview with Inside Higher Ed Trevathan spoke in very general terms regarding his views of diversity within universities, and stated "Although much progress has been made within U.S. universities, pockets of institutional racism and xenophobia persist. Those of us in the majority must be willing to change our policies and structures in order to treat those in the minority with equality, dignity and respect." Trevathan went on to state that "Christian institutions resistant to diversity sometimes cite their devotion to traditions, or 'religious freedom' as justification for overt discrimination against an entire segment of the population. It is often easy for leaders of these institutions to bend to the pressured calls for 'no change'. As a matter of conscience, and in order to enhance academic excellence, I choose to distance myself from policies of exclusion and discrimination."

== Professional activities ==
He has served as a counselor of the Professors of Child Neurology, and has served on the editorial boards of major journals such as Neurology, Disability and Health Journal, and Journal of Developmental Origins of Health and Disease.

Trevathan is an active clinical investigator and serves as the principal investigator for several clinical trials of treatments for epilepsy. More recently his research has focused on child health and childhood neurological disorders in developing countries, and major public health threats related to the developing brain. He is a frequent lecturer at national and international meetings in child health, pediatrics, and child neurology.
