= Benton Cordell Goodpasture =

B. C. Goodpasture
- Born: Benton Cordell Goodpasture; April 9, 1895; Overton County, Tennessee, U.S.
- Died: February 18, 1977 (aged 81); Nashville Tennessee, U.S.
- Education: David Lipscomb College
- Occupations: Preacher and author
- Years active: 1912–1977

Benton Cordell Goodpasture (April 9, 1895 – February 18, 1977) was a preacher and writer in the Churches of Christ. A contributing writer to the Gospel Advocate starting in 1920, in 1939 he became the publication's editor, a post he held until his death. He was the namesake of Goodpasture Christian School in Nashville Tennessee, named in his honor in 1965.

Goodpasture was born Overton County, Tennessee (in what later became Standing Stone State Park) to Jefferson Goodpasture and the former Elora Annis Thompson. He was named after the then-Governor of Tennessee Benton McMillin and Cordell Hull, then the area's state representative (later, United States Secretary of State and "father of the United Nations"). Goodpasture was baptized in October, 1909, at the age of 14.

== Preacher for the Churches of Christ ==
Goodpasture preached his first sermon at Holly Springs, Tennessee, on October 18, 1912. Other communities where he preached included Atlanta, Georgia, Florence, Alabama and Nashville, Tennessee: he is said to have led religious meetings in 20 U. S. states.

Goodpasture graduated from David Lipscomb College in 1918.

A 1932 profile in the Atlanta Journal noted Goodpasture's love of collecting rare books, many of which Goodpasture donated to Freed-Hardeman College.

== Editor of the Gospel Advocate ==
Having contributed to the Gospel Advocate since 1920, Goodpasture became the publication's editor in 1939, a post he held until his death in 1977. In 1951, he resigned his position as the pulpit minister of Hillsboro Church of Christ in Nashville, Tennessee, in order to devote his time to editing and travelling to hold meetings: he was succeeded at Hillsboro by the influential Batsell Barrett Baxter.

Goodpasture was credited with changing the stance of the publication with respect to inter-congregational support of missionary activities and orphanages which had previously been described as denominationalism by the publication's earlier editors:

"I have been able to encourage and help the preaching of the gospel in all the countries of the English-speaking world through the ADVOCATE. The editorship has offered me an opportunity to help stabilize a brotherhood torn by hobby riders and factionists. I hope that I have made a major contribution to indoctrinating and strengthening churches wherever the ADVOCATE has been read."

== Later life ==
During the schism with the non-institutional churches of Christ in the 1960s, Florida College in Temple Terrace, Florida, took the non-institutional position and thus became unsuitable in the eyes of those such as Goodpasture. Goodpasture visited B. C. Carr in Lakeland in the mid-1960s, and challenged Carr to begin a similar school to the Nashville School of Preaching in Florida. The resulting school, the Florida School of Preaching, opened in September 1969.

Goodpasture died suddenly of a stroke in the driveway of his home upon arriving home from work at the Gospel Advocate, on February 18, 1977. Notable members of the church who officiated at his funeral were Batsell Barrett Baxter and William F. Ruhl. He is buried in Woodlawn Cemetery in Nashville, Tennessee.

Preceded by John T. Hinds	Editor of the Gospel Advocate; 1939–1977	Succeeded by Ira North
