= Gospel Advocate =

Christian magazine

- May 2000 issue of Gospel Advocate
- Editor: Gregory Alan Tidwell
- Former editors: Tolbert Fanning; David Lipscomb; Robert Henry Boll; Foy E. Wallace; John T Hinds; B. C. Goodpasture; Ira North; Guy N. Woods; Furman Kearley; Neil W. Anderson; H. Leo Boles
- Categories: Churches of Christ
- Frequency: Monthly
- First issue: 1855
- Country: United States
- Language: English
- Website: gospeladvocate.com

The Gospel Advocate is a religious magazine published monthly in Nashville, Tennessee, for members of the Churches of Christ. The Advocate enjoyed uninterrupted publication since 1866 until the COVID-19 pandemic.

The Gospel Advocate was founded by Nashville-area Restoration Movement preacher Tolbert Fanning in 1855. Fanning's student, William Lipscomb, served as co-editor until the American Civil War forced them to suspend publication in 1861.

After the end of the Civil War, publication resumed in 1866 under the editorship of Fanning and William Lipscomb's younger brother David Lipscomb; Fanning soon retired and David Lipscomb became the sole editor. In 1869 the Advocate was published weekly on Thursdays and reported a circulation of 1850. The early Advocate included church news, Bible lessons, letters from readers, Bible lessons, book reviews, farm information, rural news, and anything the editors felt would be spiritually helpful. Lipscomb edited the journal for fifty years following the Civil War, making him the most influential spokesman of the time among the Churches of Christ. This was especially true in the South, because most of the other brotherhood journals were perceived as pro-Union.

== Influence ==
The Gospel Advocate has long been very influential in the Churches of Christ and was, during much of the twentieth century, the most influential journal within the brotherhood, helping to shape consensus views. As the Churches of Christ have no denominational hierarchy or "official" structures, through much of its history the views of the brotherhood have been heavily influenced by its journals and their editors (although since the 1980s lectureship speakers and university leaders have tended to have more influence than editors).

While the Advocate has always been conservative and Bible-based, the "tone and direction" has varied as editors have changed. When David Lipscomb was the editor, the focus was on seeking unity by following scripture exactly, and the Advocate's editorial position was to reject anything that is not explicitly allowed by scripture. When Foy E. Wallace was editor, the Advocate fought against premillennialism. Editor B. C. Goodpasture used the Advocate to oppose the "non-institutional" view within the Churches of Christ. Despite these differences in editorial focus, throughout its entire history the Advocate has consistently sought to promote a Christianity based on New Testament precedents.

In 1884 a Texas preacher named Austin McGary, who had written some articles in the Gospel Advocate, began publishing the Firm Foundation, which—in contradistinction to Lipscomb's irenic manner, grace-laden theology, and more-inclusivist concept of fellowship—stridently proclaimed support for rebaptism, McGary's views on that subject being remarkably similar to those of John Thomas (1805-1871), with whom Alexander Campbell had severed fellowship. Although the controversy animated the difference between the two papers for some time, they closed ranks in opposition to missionary societies and instrumental music in worship, issues which split the churches of the Restoration Movement officially in 1906.

A controversial front page editor was Robert Henry Boll, who wrote articles on Biblical prophecy during his tenure beginning in 1909; he was forced to resign in 1915 as the result of a developing controversy over his millennial views and the importance he placed on biblical prophecy in the study of the Bible. His eschatological focus came into conflict with the church-centered views of other Church of Christ leaders of the time. The reaction to Boll's premillennialism helped to define and solidify the amillennial view among the mainstream of the Churches of Christ. By the end of the 20th century, however, the divisions caused by this debate were diminishing, and in the 2000 edition of the directory Churches of Christ in the United States, published by Mac Lynn, congregations holding premillennial views were no longer listed separately.

The Gospel Advocate also publishes Sunday School materials and operates Christian bookstores in Nashville and Mesquite, Texas.
