= List of universities and colleges affiliated with the Churches of Christ =

Universities and colleges affiliated with the Churches of Christ include these institutions:

Church of Christ college	Town
Abilene Christian University	Abilene, Texas
African Christian College	Matsapha, Eswatini
Amridge University (formerly Southern Christian University)	Montgomery, Alabama
Bear Valley Bible Institute of Denver	Denver, Colorado
Crowley's Ridge College	Paragould, Arkansas
Faulkner University	Montgomery, Alabama
Florida College*	Temple Terrace, Florida
Florida School of Preaching	Lakeland, Florida
Freed-Hardeman University	Henderson, Tennessee
Great Lakes Bible College (Ontario)	Waterloo, Ontario
Georgia School of Preaching	Marietta, Georgia
Harding University	Searcy, Arkansas
Heritage Christian University	Florence, Alabama
KC University	Seoul, South Korea
Lipscomb University	Nashville, Tennessee
Lubbock Christian University	Lubbock, Texas
Memphis School of Preaching	Memphis, Tennessee
Mzuzu Bible College	Mzuzu, Malawi, Africa
Nations University	New Orleans, Louisiana
Obong University	Obong Ntak, Nigeria, Africa
Oklahoma Christian University	Edmond, Oklahoma
Pepperdine University	Malibu, California
Rochester Christian University (formerly Rochester College)	Rochester Hills, Michigan
Seoul Christian University	Seoul, South Korea
Southeast Institute of Biblical Studies	Knoxville, TN
Southwestern Christian College	Terrell, Texas
Sunset International Bible Institute	Lubbock, Texas
Tennessee Bible College	Cookeville, Tennessee
York University	York, Nebraska
Marjorie Bash College of Health Sciences and Technology	Aba, Nigeria

* Florida College has a loose affiliation with the churches of Christ (non-institutional), in that those on its board of trustees must all be members. It does not accept funding from churches.

Affiliated with the Churches of Christ universities no longer in operation include these institutions:

Church of Christ college	Town
Burritt College (closed, 1939)	Spencer, Tennessee
Cascade College (closed, 2009)	Portland, Oregon
Lipscomb University Austin Center formerly the Austin Graduate School of Theology (closed, 2022)	Austin, Texas
Magnolia Bible College (closed, 2009)	Kosciusko, Mississippi
Ohio Valley University (closed, 2022)	Vienna, West Virginia
Southeastern Christian College (closed, 1979)	Winchester, Kentucky
Western Christian College (closed, 2012)	Regina, Saskatchewan, Saskatchewan, Canada
