= Sponsoring church (Churches of Christ) =

Resource-pooling strategy applied by some Church of Christ congregations

The sponsoring church arrangement describes a resource-pooling strategy employed by some "mainstream" congregations of the Churches of Christ.

Under this arrangement, one congregation (specifically, the congregation's eldership or, if it lacks elders, the men of the congregation) agree to oversee the work of an individual (such as a missionary to another country) or group (such as a children's home). Other congregations and/or individuals, desiring to support that work, would send contributions to the overseeing congregation designated for that work. The work may be performed using a separate entity for legal purposes (and, as such, contributions would be sent to that entity) but the sponsoring church's elders/congregation would still maintain control and oversight of the entity and its work (an example being the Gospel Broadcasting Network, a satellite television network featuring Church of Christ programming, which is overseen by the elders of the Southaven Church of Christ congregation in Southaven, Mississippi).

The arrangement differs from the "missionary society" or "mission board" arrangement within denominations (such as the International Mission Board of the Southern Baptist Convention) in that, within the society or board arrangement, the denomination maintains oversight and control of the work apart from any local congregation. However, as Churches of Christ are autonomous local congregations and are intentionally non-denominational (and oppose such societies or boards as not part of the New Testament pattern), the sponsoring church arrangement exists so that individual congregations can co-operate on projects that one congregation alone would not be financially able to undertake, while maintaining local congregation oversight and control of the work.

There is within the Churches of Christ a group of congregations known as the non-institutional Churches of Christ that believe there are no Scriptures that provide a precedent or justification for "sponsoring church" arrangements. The "sponsoring church" designation (sometimes also referred to as "mainstream" or "Bible college supporting" churches) is often used to distinguish between congregations that support outside institutions and those which do not

== History ==
The historical foundation and creation of this new "sponsoring church" movement is traced to the speeches, writings and advocacy of G.C. Brewer at Abilene Christian College in the 1930s. Brewer encouraged Church of Christ congregations to actively support, both financially and through talents, the work and activities of Bible colleges, or other "institutional" entities such as orphan homes or nursing homes, which may be traditionally associated with churches of Christ. Other Church of Christ leaders who spoke out in favor of the concept included B. C. Goodpasture, N. B. Hardeman and Robert M. Alexander.

After World War II some churches created the sponsoring church arrangement to coordinate their efforts in evangelism. This began with the Broadway church in Lubbock, Texas and the Union Avenue Church in Memphis soliciting funds for evangelism in Germany and Japan, respectively.

The most well-known of some of the early efforts in the "sponsoring church" movement was the Herald of Truth radio (later television) program begun in 1951 by the Fifth and Highland Church of Christ in Abilene, Texas.

One more recent well-publicized sponsoring church arrangement is "One Nation Under God", wherein the Sycamore Church of Christ in Cookeville, Tennessee in 1991 solicited $10 million in order to send out evangelistic mailings to every household in America. Later plans to contact every household in the world were never realized.

The sponsoring church concept is particularly popular in "church planting," where an existing church sends funds, personnel, and/or missionaries to an area with no Church of Christ congregation (or to an existing area to begin work among an ethnic group in their own language) to establish a church and then oversees the nascent congregation for a period of time, until it is financially able to support itself.

== Disputes over the practice ==
The creation of the "sponsoring church" arrangement led to disputes between leaders and congregations of the Churches of Christ as to whether the practice was allowable under Biblical teaching. The movement was famously opposed by Foy E. Wallace Jr. in his writings and speeches.

Ultimately, the sponsoring church arrangement was one of a number of issues that led to the division in the 1960s between Church of Christ congregations supporting the practice and those who opposed it; the latter commonly referred to as non-institutional churches.
