= John B. Weaver =

American academic administrator and biblical scholar

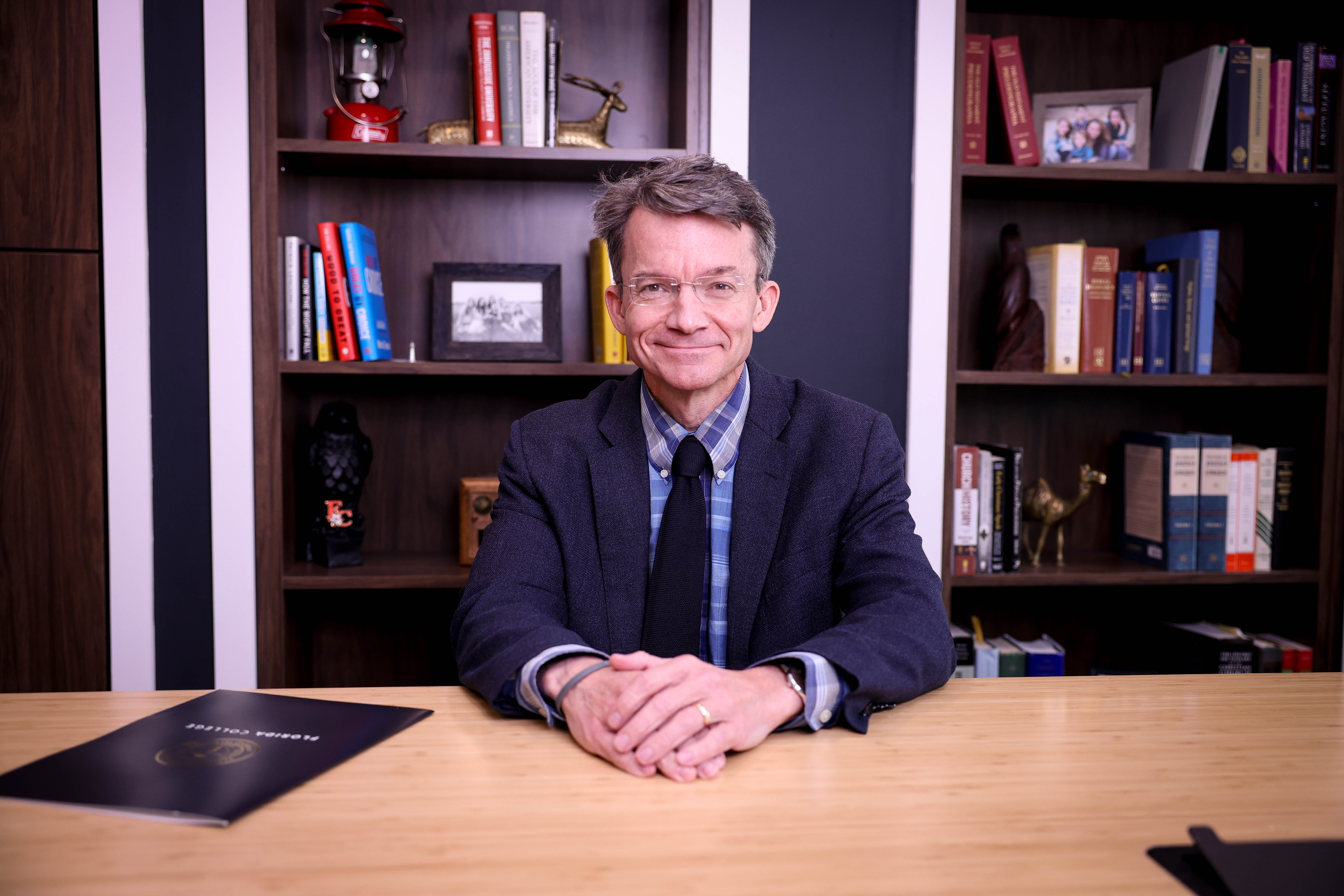
- Education: University of Arkansas (BA); University of Chicago (MA); University of South Carolina (MLIS); Emory University (PhD)
- Occupations: Academic administrator, librarian, and biblical scholar
- Employer: Florida College
- Known for: Biblical studies, academic administration, theological librarianship
- Title: President of Florida College
- Predecessor: H. E. Payne, Jr.

John B. Weaver is an American biblical scholar, theological librarian, and academic administrator serving as the sixth president of Florida College. Prior to assuming the presidency, he held senior administrative roles at several academic libraries, including serving as the director of the Burke Library at Columbia University and dean of library services at Abilene Christian University.

As a researcher, Weaver is known for his scholarship on early Christian narratives, specifically the role of "mythistory" and prison escape sequences in the Acts of the Apostles, as well as the history of the American Restoration Movement.

== Early life and education ==
Weaver comes from a family with deep historical ties to Florida College; his grandfather, James R. Cope, served as the institution's second president. During the mid-1990s, Weaver was accepted into Florida College's Upper Division Bible program.

He completed his undergraduate degree at the University of Arkansas, graduating summa cum laude with a Bachelor of Arts in 1995. He continued his theological studies at the University of Chicago Divinity School, receiving a Master of Arts in 1998. To support a career in academic administration, Weaver earned a Master of Library and Information Science (MLIS) from the University of South Carolina. He was later awarded his Ph.D. from Emory University in 2004.

== Career ==
=== Academic librarianship ===
During his doctoral studies, Weaver began a career in theological librarianship. He worked at Emory University's Pitts Theology Library, initially serving as a reference librarian before being promoted to head of public services in 2005.

In August 2009, he was appointed director of the Burke Library at Columbia University, which serves the Union Theological Seminary and houses one of North America's most extensive theological collections. During his tenure at Columbia, he sponsored web adaptations of archival projects, expanding digital access to historical religious artifacts such as the library's Quran manuscript collections.

Weaver later joined Abilene Christian University (ACU) as the dean of library services and educational technology at the Margarett and Herman Brown Library. During his time at ACU, Weaver led significant campus initiatives involving digital pedagogy, the integration of makerspaces into library environments, and oversaw operations for the Abilene Christian University Press. In addition to his university roles, Weaver has been active in professional organizations, previously serving as president of the American Theological Library Association (ATLA).

=== Florida College presidency ===
Weaver departed Abilene Christian University in December 2019 to return to his alma mater, Florida College, assuming the role of academic dean in January 2020.

In May 2022, following the retirement of his predecessor H. E. Payne, Jr., Weaver was appointed as the institution's sixth president. He officially assumed the presidency on June 1, 2022. As an ordained minister and deacon who has served in the Churches of Christ for over 18 years, Weaver continues to teach courses at the college in addition to his administrative duties. His instructional focus and recent research pertain to the history of the American Restoration Movement (also known as the Stone-Campbell Movement) and the development of the Churches of Christ into the 21st century.

== Research and publications ==
As a biblical scholar and historian, Weaver's research centers on early Christian narratives, Lukan theology, and modern restoration movements. His 2004 book, Plots of Epiphany: Prison-Escape in Acts of the Apostles, analyzes the conceptual framework of "mythistory"—historical narrative shaped by culturally significant myths. The book investigates how stories of imprisonment and divine liberation in the Acts of the Apostles parallel broader mythological traditions to recount the foundation of the early Christian cult. Reviewing the book for The Journal of Religion, scholar Richard I. Pervo praised Weaver's analysis of the phenomenon of epiphany and his rigorous methodological consistency.

In 2025, Weaver published Explorer in Search of Zion: The Spiritual Journey of David Edwin Harrell, Jr. through Florida College Press. The academic biography documents the life, itinerant preaching, global missionary efforts, and religious publishing career of prominent religious scholar David Edwin Harrell, Jr., contextualizing his advocacy for primitive Christianity within independent local churches.

Within library science, Weaver has published and lectured on the intersection of digital culture and theology, including the integration of constructionist learning and makerspaces in academic libraries.

=== Selected works ===
- Plots of Epiphany: Prison-Escape in Acts of the Apostles (Walter de Gruyter, 2004) ISBN 978-3110182668
- Explorer in Search of Zion: The Spiritual Journey of David Edwin Harrell, Jr. (Florida College Press, 2025) ISBN 978-1965356074
