= World Mission Workshop =

Annual gathering

The World Mission Workshop is an annual gathering of students of missions, missionaries and professors of missions associated with Churches of Christ. The workshop meets each year at a college campus. The 2010 workshop, the 50th meeting, was held at Harding University in Searcy, Arkansas, where the first workshop was held in 1961.

== Past and Future Workshops ==
| Year | Host | Theme |
|---|---|---|
| 1961 | Harding College | Go Ye Unto All the World |
| 1962 | Freed-Hardeman College | Unknown |
| 1963 | Michigan Christian College | Unknown |
| 1964 | Abilene Christian College | We Can Evangelize the World |
| 1965 | Harding College | Unknown |
| 1966 | Pepperdine College | Christ for the World |
| 1967 | David Lipscomb College | Unknown |
| 1968 | Lubbock Christian College | Onward Christian Soldiers |
| 1969 | Northeastern Christian College | A Meaningful Message |
| 1970 | Oklahoma Christian College | White Unto Harvest |
| 1971 | Southwestern Christian College | Ye Shall Be My Witness |
| 1972 | Abilene Christian College | Beautiful Feet |
| 1973 | Pepperdine College | The Open Door |
| 1974 | Harding College | Here Am I, Send Me |
| 1975 | Lubbock Christian College | Soldiers of Christ Arise |
| 1976 | Northeastern Christian College | Proclaim Liberty |
| 1977 | Oklahoma Christian College | Flaming Fire |
| 1978 | Freed-Hardeman College | Must Jesus Bear the Cross Alone? |
| 1979 | Abilene Christian University | God, Youth and World Missions |
| 1980 | David Lipscomb University | They Went Everywhere Spreading the Word |
| 1981 | Harding University | Where in the World |
| 1982 | Pepperdine University | A Fire in my Bones |
| 1983 | Lubbock Christian University | God So Loved the World |
| 1984 | Oklahoma Christian University | The Aroma of Christ |
| 1985 | Freed-Hardeman University | God's Great Love |
| 1986 | Columbia Christian College | Let the Redeemed of the World Say This |
| 1987 | David Lipscomb University | From the Cross to the World |
| 1988 | Abilene Christian University | Lord of the Nations |
| 1989 | Harding University | Give me this Mountain |
| 1990 | Pepperdine University | The Changeless Christ in a Changing World |
| 1991 | Lubbock Christian University | Mission '91 |
| 1992 | Oklahoma Christian University | Love in Any Language |
| 1993 | Freed-Hardeman University | Living Water for a Dying World |
| 1994 | David Lipscomb University | He is Exalted |
| 1995 | Abilene Christian University | To Know Christ, To Make Christ Known |
| 1996 | Harding University | Shine Jesus Shine |
| 1997 | Pepperdine University | City Lights |
| 1998 | Lubbock Christian University | Mission Possible: Who Will be Jesus? |
| 1999 | Oklahoma Christian University | God's Heart for the Nations |
| 2000 | Western Christian College | Crossing the Border: Christianity in a Pagan World |
| 2001 | Freed-Hardeman University | Launch Out into the Deep |
| 2002 | Abilene Christian University | Glorify, Unify, Testify |
| 2003 | Lipscomb University | The Word Became Flesh |
| 2004 | York College | Voyage of Discovery |
| 2005 | Harding University | If You say Go |
| 2006 | Lubbock Christian University | Crossing Over: Bridging all Barriers |
| 2007 | Oklahoma Christian University | Every Tribe Every Tongue |
| 2008 | Faulkner University | Who is My Neighbor? |
| 2009 | Freed-Hardeman University | He Must Increase...I Must Decrease |
| 2010 | Harding University (WMW 50th Anniversary) | So That We May Have Life |
| 2011 | ~~Abilene Christian University~~ at Fort Worth, Texas with Global Missions Conference | More Effectively Reaching Our World for Jesus Christ |
| 2012 | Rochester College | |
| 2013 | Oklahoma Christian University | Renewal |
| 2014 | Rochester College | |
| 2015 | Harding University | Relentless |
