= Charles R. Brewer =

American preacher (1890–1971)

Charles Richard Brewer (1890–1971) was an American professor, preacher, poet, and leader for the churches of Christ. Born near Gimlet Creek in Giles County, Tennessee, Brewer's career included many publications, television and radio shows, and a reputation for biblical learning. He died due to injuries resulting from a car crash. His funeral in Nashville was attended by some 3,000 people. Brewer was named "Speaker of the Year" in his final year and eventually a "Lipscomb Legend" by the university. He was scheduled to speak at Pepperdine University in April of his last year, where he was to receive the school's annual Most Distinguished Service Award. A belltower on the campus of Lipscomb University in 1935 was dedicated to his memory.

== Education ==
Brewer attended David Lipscomb College (now Lipscomb University), George Peabody College for Teachers, Hardin-Simmons University, University of Texas, Vanderbilt University and University of Chicago. He taught at David Lipscomb College in Nashville and at Abilene Christian College (now Abilene Christian University) in Abilene, Texas. He taught Bible, English Literature, drama, Greek, French, and Latin. Ever the Renaissance man, Brewer's thesis at Hardin-Simmons was on Shakespeare.

Brewer also served as president of the Nashville School of Preaching. This school was for men who wanted to preach but couldn't afford the tuition and the cost of regular colleges and universities. It still exists today in Nashville, Tennessee.

== Biblical knowledge and preaching ==
Brewer was known to amaze people on the television program Know Your Bible with his arcane knowledge of the Bible. His style as a lecturer and preacher was less contentious than that of his more famous brother, G. C. Brewer. According to one of his former students, who received his help in planting a congregation in Syracuse, New York, Brewer "was very willing to go anywhere to plant a church, even if it was small, because he was so zealous to help people become Christians".

His succinct formulation of soteriology reflects what many in the churches of Christ believed in the mid-20th Century:

"Here are some steps that God wants you to take:

1. Believe in the Lord with all your heart (Acts 16:31).

2. Repent of all sin (Acts 2:38).

3. Confess your faith in Christ (Rom. 10:9).

4. Be buried in baptism (Acts 2:38; Col. 2:12; Gal. 3:26-27).

If you obey those simple commands you will then be added to his church (Acts 2:41, 47)."

(Taken from Be Not Dismayed, pages 43-44.) Reprinted here.

This is the Biblical approach to salvation in the churches of Christ.

Brewer's friendship with Robert Henry Boll, even though critical of Boll's premillennial eschatology, facilitated World Vision Publishing Company's 1954 edition of Great Songs of the Church Number Two compiled by Boll's close associate Elmer Leon Jorgenson. Jorgenson approved World Vision's publication of this hymnal without his name on the title page as a way of improving the book's acceptability among the prevalently amillennial churches of Christ.

== Select bibliography ==
See especially Charles R. Brewer at the Restoration Movement site.

Brewer, Charles R. Above the Shadow: Poems and Sayings of Faith, Courage, Hope and Mirth. Nashville, TN: Williams Printing Co., 1964.

Brewer, Charles R. Be Not Dismayed: Messages of Cheer and Lessons of Truth. Nashville, TN: World Vision Pub. Co, 1958.

Brewer, Charles R. "Course of Study." Word & Work 23 (1930): 289. Brewer's announcement of the impending opening of the Nashville Preaching School, which still exists today. (See also)

Brewer, Charles R. A Missionary pictorial: biographical sketches and pictures of men and women who have gone from the United States as members of churches of Christ to carry the gospel to other lands together with articles and poems written for the purpose of stirring churches and individuals to greater activity in the effort to preach the gospel to every creature under heaven. Nashville: World Vision Pub. Co., 1964.

Lambert, Gussie. In Memoriam. Shreveport, LA: 1988. pages 32, 33. (reprinted here)

Gurganus, Irene. Her autobiography of George and Irene Gurganus I Married the Pope contains a few remembrances of Charles R. Brewer.
