= Churches of Christ (non-institutional) =

Fellowship within the Churches of Christ

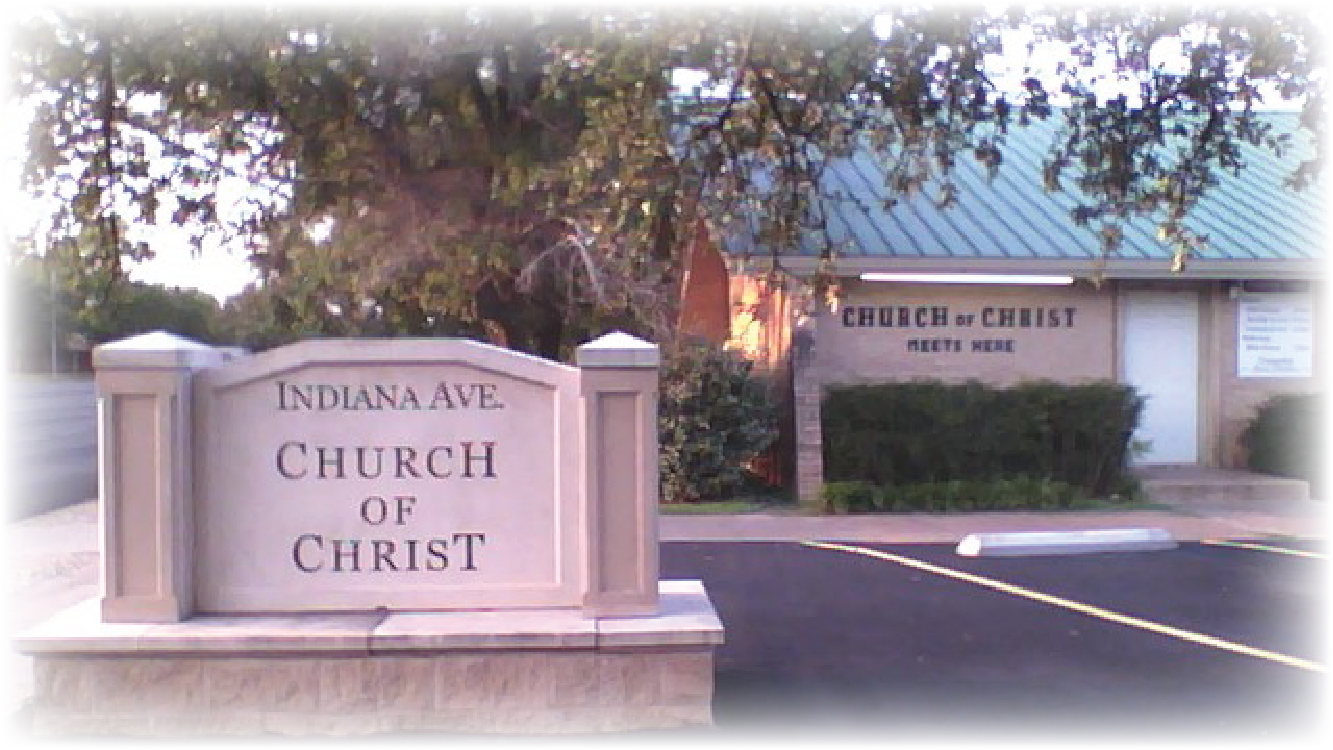
- A (non-institutional) church of Christ building in Lubbock, Texas
- Classification: Protestant
- Orientation: Restorationist
- Polity: Congregationalist
- Separations: Christian Church (Disciples of Christ) (1906); Churches of Christ (1960s)
- Congregations: 2,757 (2020)
- Members: 113,656 (2009)

The label "non-institutional" refers to a distinct fellowship within the Churches of Christ who do not agree with the support of parachurch organizations (colleges, orphans' homes, organized mission efforts, etc.) by local congregations. They contend that the New Testament includes no authority for churches' support of such institutions. Instead they feel that it is a responsibility and duty of the individual members to assist those in need. Similarly, most non-institutional congregations also oppose the use of church facilities for non-church activities (such as fellowship dinners or recreation); as such, they oppose the construction of "fellowship halls", gymnasiums, and similar structures. The belief is that, although such activities may be beneficial, they are not a proper function of a local congregation.

These local churches became separated from "mainline" (pro-institutional) churches of Christ because of these viewpoints, developing into a distinct segment of congregations by the 1960s. Whether a congregation supports the "sponsoring church" custom is one way to distinguish between the "non-institutional" and "mainstream" congregations. The congregations that advocate financial support or the pooling of resources for the benefit of other entities or organized external evangelical efforts are sometimes called "sponsoring churches" and identified as "mainstream."

== Membership ==
This fellowship of non-institutional congregations, which intentionally forgoes any para-congregational organizational structure, is estimated at 120,000 members, accounting for around 9% of the members of Churches of Christ in the United States and for about 15% of congregations.

== Identification ==
These congregations generally accept the description "non-institutional", although they do not officially identify as such on signs, letterhead, or other official documents; some consider pejorative the epithet "anti" with which they have been called by some in the usually larger mainstream Churches of Christ since the 1950s and 1960s, and likewise the similar term, "non-cooperative". Both groups identify as belonging to the original church started by Christ. The 19th-century Restoration Movement resulted in an increase in the number of U.S. members.

While the one-cup, non-class, and mutual edification congregations are almost always non-institutional, they became independent from the mainstream well before the broader 1950s division among congregations over institutions.

== Common beliefs ==
Individual churches of Christ are autonomous congregations (without hierarchical central governance, nondenominational), so doctrinal positions vary between congregations. Examples include whether or not to 'corporately' sponsor a youth outing or have auxiliary facilities like a study room or kitchen on church grounds. In general, these churches subscribe to the more conservative positions associated with churches of Christ in matters of authority, organization, and worship. Most congregations in this number can be differentiated from mainstream churches by a differentiation of the role of the individual Christian and the congregation.

As a result, they oppose the following practices that became widespread in other churches of Christ during the mid-twentieth century, namely:

- Support from the church treasury for institutions such as Bible colleges or orphans' homes. Members of non-institutional churches note a distinction between the work assigned to the individual Christian and that assigned to the local congregation collectively (citing passages such as 1 Timothy 5:16). While individuals are charged to "do good to all men," (Galatians 6:10), they believe that churches are explicitly assigned a limited number of duties (usually defined as evangelism, edification, and benevolence, the latter generally being limited to only members of a specific congregation, their family members, and/or missionaries supported by the congregation). They oppose a church giving its collective funds to an outside institution or setting up another under its control to do work which they believe the apostles assigned to the individual. For example, while they would refuse to give church funds to an orphans' home or soup kitchen, non-institutional churches would encourage individual members to help such causes.
- Churches pooling resources to perform work under the oversight of a single congregation or outside institution. Critics opposed to this practice say such cooperation did not exist in the first century churches and violates the autonomy of the local congregation. They note that the New Testament writings recorded that congregations sometimes sent aid to each other, but they say this practice was always from a single congregation to a single congregation for the benefit of members of the latter. No other arrangement for transfer of funds between churches appears in the New Testament. Thus, members of a non-institutional church would not authorize giving church funds to a missionary society or undertake a "sponsoring church" arrangement. A non-institutional church may send money to an individual preacher, as there are New Testament examples of this (Philippians 4:10–18; 1 Corinthians 9:7–14; 2 Corinthians 11:7–9).
- Church relief for non-Christians (some members define this term as those persons outside the church of Christ), especially as an evangelism tool. Critics of such aid say that every New Testament example of support of needy individuals by churches was of support of fellow Christians. They encourage individual members to seek out and personally help any persons in need, but say the church should provide support only to those it recognizes as faithful and needy Christians, per the New Testament examples. They do not consider 2 Corinthians 9:13 "the liberality of your contribution unto them and unto all" to be an example, believing that "all" means "all saints" as opposed to "all people".
- A church kitchen or "fellowship hall," as well as other forms of church-sponsored social activity. Distinguishing between the work of the church and that of individuals, members of non-institutional churches hold that social activity was an individual practice. They believe there is no example in the New Testament of church funds being used to build a kitchen and eating facility, or to finance social activities. They encourage members to develop social activities with personal funds. In addition, they say the language of 1 Corinthians 11:22–34 forbids the eating of a common meal as a work of the church.

== History ==
The diversity among autonomous congregations makes it difficult to document their history, either individually or as a group of common interest. Most activity is either the action of an individual congregation (and thus local in scope) or the activity of individuals separate from churches (and thus technically not an act of the churches as institutions). Their activities have been noted through issues that bring about debate and division. Non-institutional churches have faced two major issues in the past century: institutionalism and marriage, divorce, and remarriage.

=== Division over institutionalism ===
The lack of denominational infrastructure leaves a vacuum for inter-congregational discourse among Churches of Christ, one that often has been filled by publications and extra-church institutions such as colleges. These organizations, though overseen and run by members of Churches of Christ, were usually considered the work of individual Christians separate from the churches themselves. Among "brotherhood papers" in the mid-twentieth century, the Gospel Advocate and Firm Foundation were the oldest and most influential. Among colleges, the largest were Abilene Christian College, Pepperdine, Freed-Hardeman College, David Lipscomb College, and Harding College.

Prior to World War II, the practice of local church support for outside institutions (mostly colleges) was uncommon in churches of Christ, but not unheard of. Such arrangements tended to be kept quiet, and the Bible colleges loosely associated with churches of Christ always denied they lobbied churches for money. These denials helped to defuse dissension over the issue, as most objectors were loath to interfere with church autonomy.

==== First rumblings ====
In the 1930s, however, some men began actively promoting church funding of Bible colleges. The most prominent of these was G. C. Brewer, who throughout the decade engaged in a running debate with various people on the issue. He had begun advancing his theories in a speech at the 1931 Abilene Christian College Lectures. In 1933, he had written a series of articles in the Gospel Advocate arguing that churches should support educational institutions and charities from their treasuries. He continued this line of argumentation throughout the decade.

Finally, Brewer's unscripted remarks in support of church funding for colleges at the 1938 Abilene Christian College lectures provoked great controversy. Several writers, such as Foy E. Wallace, Jr. and W. W. Otey, wrote and spoke in opposition to Brewer; Otey's 1938 article in Firm Foundation included statements from leaders of colleges that they "regretted" Brewer's statements. Publicly, Brewer's position received little support; privately, however, prominent men such as B. C. Goodpasture, N. B. Hardeman, and Robert M. Alexander agreed with the proposition, though most were noncommital when asked specifically about their position. World War II largely suspended the debate, as the question of pacifism took center stage in "brotherhood papers." However, division had not been prevented, only postponed.

==== The aftermath of World War II ====
After the conclusion of World War II, several factors worked together to bring the institutional question back to the foreground.

First, many of the previous generation of perceived leaders (such as Daniel Sommer, J. D. Tant, Joe Warlick, and F. B. Srygley) had died, leaving others with different beliefs and dispositions to take their place. The most notable of these was Goodpasture, who had ascended to be editor of the Gospel Advocate in 1939; he is generally regarded as the most influential figure among Churches of Christ at this time.

Also, the Depression and war had led to lower enrollment at many Bible colleges; this in turn caused many of the colleges to postpone expansion and even maintenance. However, the G.I. Bill brought with it an influx of enrollment at these colleges. Bible colleges thus found themselves in need of immediate funds to renovate and expand to meet a swelling demand.

Finally, evangelism in Europe became possible after the war. However, the expense involved was considerable. As a result, some congregations and individuals began experimenting with various methods of congregational cooperation. The most notable of these was the "sponsoring church" arrangement, where one congregation oversees a project using resources pooled from other congregations. The best-known of these efforts was the Herald of Truth, a nationwide radio program begun by the Highland Church of Christ in Abilene, Texas, in 1952.

==== Controversy and division erupt ====
The issue of church support for institutions arose anew quickly after the war. Many of those who had been silent before now saw much to gain by raising the issue. No longer was it a mere hypothetical question, but one where a strict interpretation of congregational independence and separation of the individual and the church would, in their estimation, lead to lost opportunities.

The pro-institutional camp learned from the experience of the 1930s and the tepid support for sending money to colleges from the church treasury. They tried a different tactic, tying church support of colleges with church support of other institutions, namely orphans' homes. As N. B. Hardeman wrote in Firm Foundation in 1947, "I have always believed that a church has the right to contribute to a school or an orphanage if it so desired... The same principle that permits one must also permit the other. They must stand or fall together." This statement serves as a summary statement of the "institutional" or "mainline" position.

The addition of the emotional element of "starving orphans" proved successful at persuading many who had been on the fence to the institutional side during the 1950s. However, it also led to rancor; what had previously been a largely civil debate erupted into name-calling and bitter dissension. Those who objected to churches funding private institutions were often referred to as "orphan haters", "Pharisees," and the like; for their part, non-institutionals such as Foy E. Wallace, Jr. returned (and at times initiated) the rhetorical fire. Well-known preachers with ties to the colleges became increasingly assertive in condemning anyone who disagreed. Accusations of coercion and intimidation swirled around the colleges. Those with outside businesses, particularly on the non-institutional side, often found themselves facing boycotts organized by those opposing their position.

The leading voices of the institutional movement were men such as G. C. Brewer, N. B. Hardeman, Robert M. Alexander, and B. C. Goodpasture. The non-institutional side of the debate was led by men such as Foy E. Wallace Jr., Roy Cogdill, and Fanning Yater Tant. From the beginning, the non-institutional side found itself outmaneuvered by the institutionals, who held the reins of power at all the large Bible colleges and the most popular of publications. It was not aided by infighting between the various proponents, climaxing in the 1951 split of the Fourth and Groesbeck Church of Christ in Lufkin, Texas, leading to two congregations, one with Cogdill as preacher, the other with Wallace's brother Cled preaching. Foy Wallace, the most polarizing figure in the debate, thereafter ceased arguing for a non-institutional position; indeed, by the mid-1960s, he associated himself exclusively with institutional churches.

Late 1954 provided two factors key to the developing split. First, in October, G. H. P. Showalter, the editor of Firm Foundation, died and was replaced by Reuel Lemmons. The paper had in previous years stood opposed to the colleges on many matters and had positioned itself under Showalter as a place for balanced debate. Under Lemmons, however, the paper took an increasingly pro-institutional position.

The second, and more important, action was publicized in the Gospel Advocate in December of that year. Goodpasture called for a "yellow tag of quarantine" to be imposed upon any who espoused the non-institutional position. The historian David Edwin Harrell contrasted B. C. Goodpasture with the "fighting style" of Foy Wallace: "Foy Wallace scorched heretics; Goodpasture warned them they would lose their position within the brotherhood." Goodpasture's political style led him "to cut his losses and to consolidate his assets," in the words of historian Richard Hughes. He recommended expelling non-institutional members from existing congregations, firing preachers who took this position and cancelling their meetings at institutional churches, and blackballing congregations that resisted conforming to institutionalism. The institutional movement turned from persuasion to isolation of its opponents.

Across the next decade, bitter division erupted in Churches of Christ throughout the nation. Debates were held over the issues, though usually positions had already hardened beyond persuasion. Preachers suspected of taking positions at odds with the leadership were ordered to publicly refute said position as a condition of employment; the Gospel Advocate became a forum for some better-known preachers to recant publicly previous positions opposing institutionalism. Some churches were forced to make token donations to institutions in order to avoid being called "anti's." Conflict sometimes ended in fistfights. Members who espoused a minority position in a congregation were expelled. Lawsuits over building ownership followed from some of these divisions. Exiles often banded together to form new congregations; some rural communities today are home to two or more small Churches of Christ as the legacy of this division.

By the end of the 1960s, the isolation of non-institutionals from the mainstream churches was concluded. Contact between churches and individuals across the divide essentially ended. Members of both branches practiced the beliefs which they held were the only correct ones.

=== Aftermath of the division ===
Most non-institutional churches had to rebuild in the 1960s and 1970s, as in most instances, they had lost buildings, positions, and jobs as a result of the division. They were united by their beliefs during this period. The most significant discussion of this time reflected the "unity in diversity" debate taking place in institutional churches; but it was little accepted in the more conservative non-institutional branch. Men such as Carl Ketcherside and Edward Fudge preached this message.

Most within non-institutional churches refer to themselves as "conservative" churches of Christ and refer to the Bible college-supporting, "mainstream" or "sponsoring church" congregations as "liberal," which leads to some confusion since the "mainline" churches use the terms "conservative" and "liberal" to refer to two separate strands within their own congregations. Many in the non-institutional congregations are not aware that institutional congregations have their own differences, and consider them all as "liberal." Many in the institutional congregations do not know the history or existence of the non-institutional groups.

Of the colleges connected with the churches of Christ, Florida College is the only one associated with the non-institutional churches, although this relationship is informal, as it does not accept funds from churches.

In 2009, non-institutional churches of Christ comprised 113,656 members across 1,898 congregations.

=== Attempts at unity ===
Over the years, several attempts have been made to achieve unity between non-institutional congregations and those described as main-stream. A more recent reconciliation attempt involved a series of discussions that took place on November 15, 2019, in Dickson, Tennessee, at Freed-Hardeman University's Renaissance Center. Doug Burleson, Associate Professor in Bible at Freed-Hardeman University and Assistant Dean of the College of Biblical Studies, and Kyle Pope, who preaches for the Olsen Park Church of Christ in Amarillo, Texas, sat down for an informal series of living room conversations. During this event, both parties discussed their understanding of biblical principles regarding benevolence, treasuries, and institutions. Although no formal agreement was found, it showed the potential of unity for the first time since the 1950s. In October 2019 editions of both Truth Magazine and the Gospel Advocate included six articles discussing the underlying Biblical questions surrounding institutionalism; Burleson and Pope each contributed three articles.
