= Mzuzu Bible College =

College in Malawi

Coordinates: 11.4202°S 33.9910°E

Mzuzu Bible College is a private college located in Mzuzu, Malawi. It is affiliated with the Churches of Christ. Mzuzu Bible College was started in 1992 by an American missionary, Jame D. Rujat. The college is overseen by Thomaston Road Church of Christ in Macon, Georgia, United States.
