= N. B. Hardeman =

American clergyman and educator (1874–1965)

Nicholas Brodie Hardeman
- Born: May 18, 1874; Milledgeville; Tennessee, USA
- Died: November 6, 1965 (aged 91); Memphis, Tennessee
- Resting place: Henderson City Cemetery in Henderson, Tennessee
- Education: West Tennessee Christian College
- Political party: Democratic
- Spouse: Joanna Tabler Hardeman (married 1901-1940, her death) (2) Annie Brown Hardeman (surviving spouse)
- Children: Dorsey B. Hardeman, 1902-1992 Mary Nelle Hardeman Powers, 1904-1991 Carrie Neal Hardeman Foy, 1908-1978

Nicholas Brodie Hardeman (May 18, 1874 – November 6, 1965) was an educator, debater, and a gospel preacher in the Churches of Christ. Along with Arvy G. Freed, Hardeman in 1907 co-founded what became Freed-Hardeman University, first known as the National Teachers Normal and Business College, or NTN&BC, in Henderson, Tennessee. In 1919, the institution was renamed Freed-Hardeman College. In 1990, it acquired university status. From 1925 to 1950, Hardeman was the president of Freed-Hardeman. He was an avid horse enthusiast, having participated in Tennessee Walking Horse competitions as an owner, rider, and a judge.

== Early years ==
Hardeman was born in Milledgeville in western Tennessee, the son of Dr. John B. Hardeman, Sr., a physician, and his wife, Nancy. He graduated in 1895 with a Bachelor of Arts from West Tennessee Christian College in Henderson. Thereafter, he received a Master of Science degree from the same college. This institution was renamed Georgie Robertson Christian College.

On April 21, 1901, Hardeman married the former Joanna Tabler. The service was performed in Henderson by the clergyman A. G. Freed. "Miss Jo", a lifelong resident of Henderson, attended Georgie Robertson, excelled in music, and headed the Instrumental Music and Voice Department at Georgie Robertson and then Freed-Hardeman until her death on May 6, 1940.

Hardeman became an instructor at Georgie Robertson and served as the vice president of the institution. A charismatic gospel preacher, he served as the minister or assistant minister of the Henderson church of Christ at various times periods. He was also a trustee of that congregation. Hardeman served too as superintendent of the Chester County School District even while he was an instructor, vice president and later president of Freed-Hardeman College.

In the late 1890s and early 1900s a split occurred within the local Christian Church/church of Christ in regard to the use of musical instruments in the worship services. In January 1903, after much discussion and prayer, a majority of the members left the church and formed what is now the Henderson church of Christ. Hardeman and his family, including his father, the families of his brothers and sisters, and followers in the faith, joined the new congregation. Because the Georgie Robertson administration was pro-musical instruments, Hardeman resigned as vice president of the institution.

== The roots of Freed-Hardeman ==
Because of the lack of funding from private sources, mostly a result of the withdrawal of members and opposition to the use of musical instrument in worship, Georgie Robertson ceased operations after the 1906–1907 school year.

Hardeman and A. G. Freed, the former president of Georgie Robertson College, were approached by local businessmen about opening a new institution of high learning. Wanting the new facility to remain in Henderson, Freed and Hardeman offered to purchase the land and buildings of Georgie Robertson. However, the entity that owned the land and buildings, the Tennessee Missionary Association, a branch of the Christian Church, refused the offer because of the ongoing dispute between the Christian Church and the church of Christ. Hardeman and Freed hence purchased land across the street from Georgie Robertson, with their own monies. Construction then began on what is now known as the Old Main Building. Because construction was underway on the new school, the 1907–1908 academic year was conducted in local businesses along Front Street. Several years later, some of the oldest buildings along Front Street were razed for redevelopment. A notebook filled with class notes belonging to A.G. Freed was found on an upper floor. In the fall of 1908, NTN&BC opened for its first school session in its final location. Freed became the first president of NTN&BC, and Hardeman became vice president.

The former lands and buildings of Georgie Robertson College were later donated to the Chester County school system and served as the county high school and later an elementary school. Hardeman, meanwhile, continued to serve as the public school superintendent. In 1963, the buildings were sold to Freed-Hardeman by the school system and renamed the Milan-Sitka Building, in honor of the Churches of Christ at Milan and Sitka, Tennessee, which had raised funds for the purchase. Primarily used by the theatre, business, and mathematics departments, the building was demolished in 2004. The new Bulliner-Clayton Visual Arts Center, built on the site of the old Milan-Sitka Gymnasium, opened at the beginning of the Fall 2007 semester. The original gymnasium floor serves as a patio to the new building.

In 1919, NTN&BC was purchased from Freed and Hardeman, and a board of trustees composed of church of Christ members was authorized to operate the college. By unanimous decision, NTN&BC was renamed in honor of the two founders and became Freed-Hardeman College. The building, known as the Main Administration Building (later, Old Main), was designed by local architect Hubert Thomas McGee, who eventually designed ten buildings for the school.

Hardeman kept busy with his duties with Freed-Hardeman College and the Chester County schools. He was also a widely regarded preacher and speaker. He was often invited to hold gospel meetings throughout the country; some of the revivals lasted for several weeks.

Hardeman was a prolific debater on theological matters. His first such exchange occurred when he was twenty-five; he had been preaching for only two years at that time. His debate with the Missionary Baptist clergyman, Ben M. Bogard of Little Rock, Arkansas, was considered one of his finest performances in the exchange of theological views.

== Hardeman Tabernacle Sermons ==
The highlight of Hardeman's preaching career was his Tabernacle Sermons at the Ryman Auditorium, a series of five lectures held in Nashville, Tennessee, in 1922, 1923, 1928, 1938, and 1942.

The first of these meetings was held at Ryman between March 28 and April 16, 1922. Reports of the meeting were carried in The Tennessean and the Nashville Banner. Many national and regional newspapers carried reports on the conference. Attendance at the meetings ranged from six to eight thousand persons. As many as two to three thousand were turned away because of the lack of space.

Because of the great interest shown, Hardeman commissioned the printing of the text of the meeting. The first edition sold out, as did subsequent editions. In 1992, Hardeman's grandson Joe Hardeman Foy, and his family, assisted in a reprint of the three volumes which made up the four Tabernacle Sermons. These were presented to Bible students at Freed-Hardeman as a gift from the Hardeman family.

== Presidency of Freed-Hardeman College ==
In 1923, tensions arose between A. G. Freed and N. B. Hardeman. The trustees asked both men to leave the institution for a time. Freed resigned as president. W. Claude Hall served as president from 1923 to 1925. In the 1925–1926 school year, Hardeman and Hall Laurie Calhoun served as co-presidents. Meanwhile, Freed went on to become vice president of David Lipscomb College in Nashville, a position that he held until his death in 1931. When Calhoun resigned at the end of the 1925-1926 session, Hardeman continued as president of the college. In 1950, Hardeman was accused of abusing two male students, and firing a female employee who supported the students story. Two thirds of the student body quit school in February, demanding refunds. In addition, 9 of 14 teachers quit in support of the students. With the school facing insolvency, Hardeman resigned. He was succeeded by Hubert A. Dixon.

Before he returned to FHC in 1925, Hardeman and colleague Ira Douthitt took an overseas trip to Europe and the Holy Land, which particularly influenced Hardeman.

== Later years and death ==
After Joanna Tabler Hardeman's death in May 1940, Hardeman married the former Miss Annie Brown, also an accomplished musician and faculty member at FHC. In April 1950, Hardeman resigned the presidency of FHC and left Henderson to reside in Memphis. He continued to preach and hold a limited amount of gospel meetings until his health prevented him from doing so.

Hardeman died in Memphis late in 1965. He was interred at the Henderson City Cemetery in the family plot. Annie Brown Hardeman was subsequently buried near her parents in Columbia, Tennessee.

== Views on race ==
Hardeman was adamant that the black and white races should not mingle, and refused to shake hands with black Christians. In 2019, Oklahoma Christian University renamed an auditorium named after Hardeman because of his views.

== Legacy ==
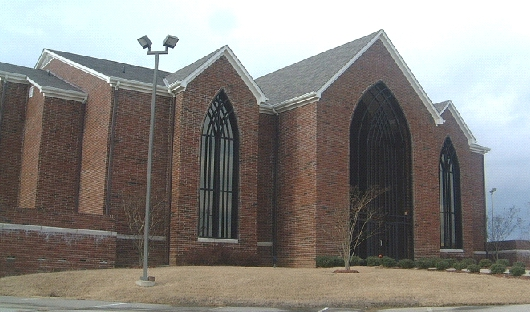
The N.B. Hardeman Library

The bulk of Hardeman's papers are housed at the Memphis School of Preaching, in the N. B. Hardeman Library on Forest Hills Road in Memphis. Hardeman's personal office (furniture, etc.) has been re-created at Oklahoma Christian University, in Edmond.

Several members of the Hardeman family have served in local, state and national politics. Hardeman's son, Dorsey Brodie Hardeman was a prominent political figure in Texas. Hardeman County in Tennessee and Hardeman County in Texas are named in honor of ancestors of the Hardeman family.

From July 1–3, 2007, "Tabernacle Sermons Today" was held at Ryman Auditorium with former students of Hardeman and former professors and preachers of the church of Christ taking part in the event. The Gospel Broadcasting Network (GBN) sponsored and broadcast the event.

== References and sources ==
- Bradshaw, Joanne Powers. Personal Interview. August 4, 2008.
- Freed-Hardeman University Catalog, 2006–2007, 'History of Freed-Hardeman University", Freed-Hardeman University Publisher, 2005, page 10.
- Hardeman Family Papers, December 3, 1985. Tennessee State Library & Archives.
- Hardeman, N.B, Hardeman Tabernacle Sermons, Vol. 1, Freed-Hardeman University, Publisher, 1977
- Hardeman, Hardeman Tabernacle Sermon, Vol. 2
- Hardeman, Hardeman Tabernacle Sermon, Vol. 3
- Hester, Samuel, History of the Restoration Movement, Freed Hardeman University, 1990
- Howell, Ellenor J. Hardeman. "The Hardeman Family of West Tennessee." 2004

== See also ==
- Restoration Movement
