= G. C. Brewer =

American minister in the Churches of Christ (1884–1956)

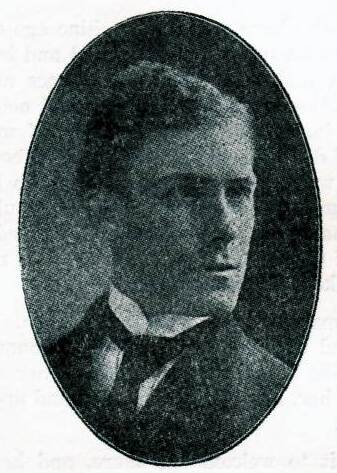
Brewer in 1912

Grover Cleveland Brewer (1884–1956) was a leader in the Churches of Christ in the US. He was said to be "among the giants of the brotherhood".

== Early life ==
"G. C." Brewer was named for U.S. President Grover Cleveland and is generally known by his initials. He was born in Giles County, Tennessee and died in Searcy, Arkansas, on June 9, 1956. He was an author, preacher, and teacher, serving on the faculty of Lipscomb University (then known as David Lipscomb College).

G. C. Brewer challenged Catholicism and Communism.

== Doctrine of grace ==
According to Leonard Allen (163-64), John Mark Hicks, and Richard Hughes (186-87), Brewer's championing of K. C. Moser's book The Way of Salvation (1932) signaled a paradigm shift in the way that people in the Churches of Christ were thinking about grace.

After reading Moser’s book, he wrote a series of articles in the Gospel Advocate arguing that churches should financially support educational institutions and charities. Brewer wrote that "Our salvation does not depend upon our perfect adherence to the requirements of law. By making our salvation dependent upon our own perfection, we make void the grace of God" (qtd. in Allen 164).

He faced opposition in this belief from figures such as Foy E. Wallace; the two engaged in a longstanding feud over this and other issues, across Abilene Christian College Bible Lectures and in the pages of the Gospel Advocate and other periodicals.

== Schism and Non-Institutional Churches ==
Wallace took Moser's book for "denominational error on the gospel plan of salvation" (qtd. in Hicks) whereas Brewer sought to de-emphasize legalism and human works and to promote a theory of God-given "unmerited favor" (Hughes 186).

Disagreements between Brewer and Wallace (albeit more financial than theological) eventually led to a schism, whereby they debated the propriety of churches funding colleges. Non-institutional Churches of Christ noted that Brewer made an unwavering call for congregational support of colleges associated with the Churches of Christ, a position that non-institutional churches rejected. These differences eventually led to the formation of the churches of Christ (non-institutional). Historian Richard Hughes has characterized Wallace's "fighting style" (176-77, 182-85) in a way that could well describe Brewer's rhetorical aggression.

== Politics and Pacifism ==
Despite Brewer's clearly stated patriotism, he was also a product of the teachings of James A. Harding and David Lipscomb. At their Nashville Bible School (Lipscomb University), where Brewer enrolled in 1904 after a year at Johnson Bible College, Brewer learned to downplay politics, a lesson he held dear his entire life. Hughes has noted "that shortly before his [Brewer's] death in 1956 he recalled, "I have never even voted in my life" (186). Lipscomb had been a lifelong pacifist, even during the Civil War, yet Brewer believed that the threat of Communism was simply too great to ignore. Brewer therefore balanced his disengagement from the ways of the world with his active concerns for the Christian identity of American politics. This balance characterized many of the Churches of Christ in the mid-20th century.

Brewer was also an anti-feminist, attributing much of America's 20th-century moral decline to the emancipation of women. He opined that women in positions of authority must "constantly battle against the tendency to become masculine, coarse, and brazen." He blamed liberated fallen women for irresistibly tempting good Christian boys into sexual sin. He also believed that women were the spiritual inferiors of men. Sinful men can be reformed, but, "When woman goes wrong... there is little hope of ever reaching her...she can never be worth anything in his world...it were better for her to go immediately to the electric chair."

Brewer was also a conspiracy theorist, claiming that "The United States passed completely under the control of Roman Catholics, Jews and Communists under the reign of Franklin D. Roosevelt". Weakly defending against his suspicions that he might be a bigot, Brewer wrote, "Not all Jews are un-American, not all Catholics are disloyal to our ideals, but all Communists are un-American and anti-American. The Jews are internationalists, the Catholics are subject to a foreign power, and the Catholic system is contrary to American ideals." (Autobiography, p. 26)

== Family life ==
Brewer married Mary Elizabeth Hall on October 24, 1911. They had one daughter, Virginia Elizabeth, and a son who died in infancy.

His brother, Dr. Charles R. Brewer, was also a notable preacher and a teacher at David Lipscomb University, where a bell tower still stands in his honor in 2022.

== Books by G. C. Brewer ==
- The Model Church. Nashville, TN: McQuiddy Printing Co, 1919. ISBN 0-89225-167-0 See for online text. Also reprinted by the Gospel Advocate, ISBN 0-89225-123-9.
- Christ Crucified: A Book of Sermons Together with a Lecture on Evolution. Nashville, TN: Gospel Advocate, 1959. (rpt. of 1928 ed.)
- Contending For the Faith. Nashville: Gospel Advocate, 1941.
- As Touching Those Who Were Once Enlightened. Nashville: Gospel Advocate, 1946.
- Forty Years on the Firing Line. Old Paths Book Club, 1948.
- Foundation Facts and Primary Principles: Being the Restoration Story Related and Re-Examined in a Manner Suited for a Textbook. Kansas City, Mo.: Old Paths Book Club, 1949.
- A Story of Toil and Tears of Love and Laughter: Being the Autobiography of G. C. Brewer. Murfreesboro, TN: DeHoff Publications, 1957. (Sometimes this is cited simply as "Autobiography of G. C. Brewer.")

== Articles and miscellaneous publications ==
"Can Churches Scripturally Contribute to Christian Colleges?" Harding University Lectures. Vol. 24. 1947. pg. 109.

"Christ Today: Our Mediator and High Priest." (speech given in February 1938 and reprinted on pages 199-209 of the volume Abilene Christian College Lectures printed by Abilene Christian College Bookstore later in 1938)

"Communism and Its Four Horsemen." Voice of Freedom. Vol. 22, pg. 10. (See also "Communism and Its Four Horsemen: Atheism, Immorality, Class Hatred, Pacifism." Nashville: Gospel Advocate. n.d.)

"Grace and Law: Legalism and Liberalism" (a series of articles that originally ran in the Gospel Advocate in 1955.) Firm Foundation reprinted some of these articles in 1992-93.

"Read this Book," Gospel Advocate 75 (11 May 1933): 434. (Brewer's book review of K. C. Moser's The Way of Salvation

"Relationship of Christian Education to the Church." Harding University Lectures. Vol. 24. 1947. pg. 95.

== Sources ==
- Allen, Leonard C. Distant Voices: Discovering a Forgotten Past for a Changing Church. Abilene, TX: ACU Press, 1993. (See especially pages 162-69.)
- Hughes, Richard T. Reviving the Ancient Faith: The Story of Churches of Christ in America. Cambridge, UK: Eerdmans, 1996.
- Lambert, Gussie. In Memoriam. Shreveport, LA: 1988. pages 34, 35.
