= Memphis School of Preaching =

Church of Christ-affiliated collegiate institution in Tennessee

- Forest Hill Church of Christ - home of the Memphis School of Preaching

Location
- Germantown, Tennessee, US; 35.1497°N 89.9691°W

Information
- Former name: Getwell School of Preaching
- Type: Private collegiate institution
- Religious affiliation: Church of Christ
- Established: 1966
- Founder: Roy J. Hearn
- Website: www.msop.org

The Memphis School of Preaching (MSOP) is a two-year collegiate institution devoted to the training of gospel preachers within the Church of Christ branch of Christian theology. It is overseen by the elders of the Forest Hill Church of Christ in Germantown, a suburb of Memphis, in the U.S. state of Tennessee.

== Faculty ==
Since January 2013, MSOP has been under the direction of B.J. Clarke, who replaced Administrative Dean Bobby Liddell. Currently there are ten instructors, each having spent over a decade preaching for congregations and performing the work of a preacher, some even continuing in that work. The current instructors include B.J. Clarke, Billy Bland, Bobby Liddell, Daniel F. Cates, Kevin Rutherford, Keith A. Mosher, Sr., Michael McDaniel, Allen Webster, and T.J. Clarke.

== History ==
The Memphis School of Preaching had its beginning in 1966 at the Getwell church in Memphis, Tennessee, being first known as "Getwell School of Preaching." Roy J. Hearn, an experienced educator and Bible teacher at two Christian colleges, saw the need for such a school to train preachers for the churches of Christ. It was felt that a two-year, intensive program of study would be the most effective way to equip a man to become a Christian preacher. He was encouraged in this endeavor by others such as N.B. Hardeman. There have been over 1,000 men who have graduated in the annual graduation exercises.

On the last Sunday in March, 1967, the first Memphis School of Preaching Lectureship took place and continued through Thursday of that week. This lectureship now continues to take place annually during that same week in March.

In March, 1969, it was decided that the school move from Getwell to the Knight Arnold Church of Christ. Classes were held in the various classrooms of the church building, and the auditorium was used for a chapel. Makeshift offices were set up in other rooms for Hearn and other instructors.

In 1972, a two-story building to the rear of the church auditorium was erected, which included classrooms, equipment, offices, and a library. In 1978, the church auditorium was "stretched" to seat twice as many, or 724 people. With the annual lectureships growing, as well as the Knight Arnold congregation, additional space was necessary to accommodate everyone. The auditorium was redecorated, with new carpets and pews installed.

In 1982, Curtis A. Cates joined the school as a faculty member and eventual successor to Hearn as school director. Hearn had expressed a wish to the elders of Knight Arnold that he would just like to study, teach, and write, so he was relieved of his administrative duties while he continued to teach for a time.

Curtis A. Cates had academic training and administrative experience in teaching in Christian colleges, as well as having a teaching doctorate. He was known to many of the early graduates who took extension courses under him while he was with Alabama Christian School of Religion (formerly Southern Christian University, now Amridge University). Through these contacts with Amridge and other Christian colleges and universities, many of the brethren within the church of Christ had developed a high regard for the caliber of the instruction MSOP had given them.

As the new millennium approached, so too did the need to move the school to its present location. The school moved to the city of Germantown. This provided the school a backdrop that was more rural and less laden with crime, and which had plenty of room for growth. So the Knight Arnold Congregation decided to move its ministry and the MSOP to its present location in Germantown, changing the congregation's name to Forest Hill.

At the beginning of 2007, the eldership at Forest Hill announced that Cates would be stepping down from the position of director to become the director emeritus. As of March 27, 2007, Bobby Liddell, who graduated from MSOP in 1979, would become the third director. It was also announced that Cates would continue to teach at the school but would, in passing on his position, have more time to travel and write.

During 2012, Bobby Liddell expressed his desire to take up a more active role in teaching and in local preaching. Effective January 1, 2013, B.J. Clarke became the fourth and current director of the school. He arrived in 2006 as an instructor and also served as dean of admissions during that time. Bobby Liddell remains as a faculty member teaching classes and serving as administrative dean.

== Lectureship ==
One of the highlights of the year for the Forest Hill Church of Christ and the preaching school is the Memphis School of Preaching Lectureship. During a typical worship service, the Forest Hill auditorium is only filled on the lower section. During the lectureship week, however, both decks of the auditorium are filled to capacity (holding over 1,100 people).

In the past, topical studies have been considered, such as "Sin and Salvation," "The Apostle Paul," "Lessons in Lyrics," and "What is Man?" Bible books, for example, "Ecclesiastes and Song of Solomon," "Genesis," and "1 and 2 Timothy and Titus," have also been examined. Guy N. Woods, Wendell Winkler, Alan Highers, Franklin Camp, Rex A. Turner, Sr., Thomas B. Warren, Garland Elkins, and Robert R. Taylor, Jr., among others known throughout the churches of Christ, have preached at the MSOP Lectureship. Each lecture remains available in various forms of media, including tapes, CDs, books, and the internet. An open forum, in which the moderator, Garland Elkins, gave biblical answers to biblical questions, was also held each day of the lectureship until being replaced by another lecture in 2009.

== Campus ==
The MSOP school building itself is connected to the Forest Hill Church of Christ building. It serves as the primary classrooms for the school.

=== N.B. Hardeman Library ===
Soon the need for a separate library was seen due to the numerous volumes and other materials and memorabilia accumulated for use by the school and its students. A financial contribution by Joanne Bradshaw, granddaughter of N.B. Hardeman, helped the school to build the N.B. Hardeman Library.

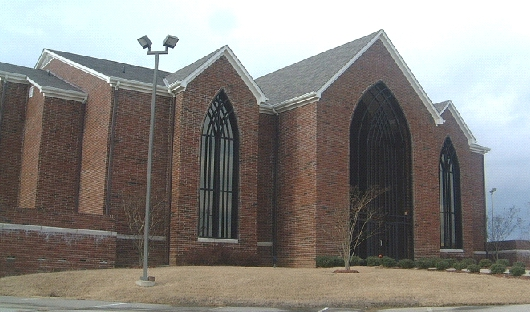
The N.B. Hardeman Library

The central area of the first floor features a glass display case, featuring priceless memorabilia and pictures of brother Hardeman and his family, as well as paintings of his grandchildren. The case also displays hand written sermon outlines by Hardeman, and pictures of his Tabernacle Sermons in Nashville. Also on the first floor are reference books, various Bible translations, audio and video tapes, and back issues of church periodicals, including some publications dating back to the 1800s, such as the Gospel Advocate.

The second floor of the library houses a variety of books, including text books on Christian Evidences and Bible Geography, lectureship books on various Biblical subjects dating back 50+ years. Also on the second floor are work stations and computers that can be used as an electronic card catalog, or for the students to conduct research for papers and assignments. The library also contains numerous videos of lectureships and debates from around the nation.

=== Student Housing ===
The desire to build Student Housing on the MSOP campus began when the school moved to its current location on Forest Hill-Irene Road. The original plans for the current location actually included the Student Housing within them, but it took several years in order for the school to secure the land that was needed, to finalize those plans, and to receive approval for construction from the City of Germantown. In 2006, construction began on the four apartment buildings known as the Student Housing; the total cost of which would be $3,500,000. By 2009, the debt had been paid in full by various donations.

Student Housing was opened to students of MSOP in July 2007. The Housing consists of four apartment buildings, each with eight apartments, standing on the campus of the Forest Hill Church of Christ. Each of the thirty-two apartments has three bedrooms, two bathrooms, a living room, a kitchen, a dining room, a laundry room, a storage room, and either a balcony or a patio.

A playground was installed behind the Housing in 2009 for the children to enjoy. The playground was built with donations made to the school in memory of Liddell's sister who had died not long before.

== Sources ==
- 2004-2007 Memphis School of Preaching General Catalog, PDF Version
- "My congratulations to Brother Liddell" from Dr. Curtis Cates, via MSOP website
