= Truth Magazine (religious magazine) =

American Christian periodical (founded 1956)

- Editor: Mark Mayberry
- Associate editor: Connie W. Adams
- Categories: Religion, Christianity
- Frequency: Monthly
- Founded: 1956
- Company: Truth Publications (formerly known as Guardian of Truth Foundation)
- Country: United States
- Based in: Athens, Alabama
- Website: www.truthmagazine.com

Truth Magazine is a religious magazine published by Truth Publications (formerly known as the Guardian of Truth Foundation), a non-profit organization associated with members of the churches of Christ.

The magazine began publishing in 1956. It publishes once a month and offers both print-based and online subscriptions.

Truth Publications also publishes books under the trade name Truth Books which are sold through its online bookstore, a hymnal titled and sold under the name Psalms, Hymns, and Spiritual Songs, and an online directory of non-institutional Churches of Christ.

== History ==
Truth Magazine began publishing in 1956 under that name.

In 1981, the magazine's foundation purchased the Gospel Guardian and renamed the magazine Guardian of Truth. Similarly, the foundation financing the publication was renamed the Guardian of Truth Foundation.

In December 1992, the magazine merged with Searching the Scriptures, a periodical edited by Connie W. Adams, who upon the merger became the associate editor. Archived issues of Searching the Scriptures are available via the magazine's website.

In January 1999, the publication reverted to its original name of Truth Magazine, although the foundation's name remained Guardian of Truth Foundation.

In the early 2010s, the publisher became known as Truth Publications.

== Editors and associate editors ==
- Bryan Vinson, Jr. (editor, 1956 – August 1962)
  - Leslie Diestelkamp and Gordon J. Pennock (associate editors with Vinson, dates unknown)
- Cecil Willis (editor, August 1962 – May 1977)
- Mike Willis (editor, May 1977 – 2016)
- Mark Mayberry (editor, 2016–present)
  - Connie W. Adams (associate editor, 1992–present)
