= Sam Winterbotham =

British tennis coach (born 1973)

Current position
- Title: Head coach
- Record: 178-60 (64-26 SEC)

Biographical details
- Born: 1 October 1973 (age 53); Stoke-on-Trent, Great Britain

Playing career
- 1996–1999: Oklahoma Christian

Coaching career (HC unless noted)
- 2002–2006: Colorado
- 2006–2017: Tennessee

Accomplishments and honors

Championships
- SEC (2010, 2011); SEC Tournament (2010)

Awards
- 2006 ITA Mountain Region Coach of the Year; 2008 & 2010 SEC Coach of the Year; 2009 ITA Southeast Region Coach of the Year; 2011 ITA Ohio Valley Region Coach of the Year; 2011 ITA Ohio Valley Region Coach of the Year; 2013 ITA National Coach of the Year; 2013 ITA Ohio Valley Region Coach of the Year

Sam Winterbotham (born 1 October 1973) is a British college tennis coach and former college player. He was the head coach of the Tennessee Volunteers men's tennis team of the University of Tennessee. Winterbotham was previously an assistant coach for the Baylor Bears where he helped guide the team to the 2004 national title with the team that he had previously recruited. His first stint as a head coach came in 2002 when he became the head coach for the Colorado Buffaloes men's tennis team.

== Playing career ==
He attended Oklahoma Christian University in Oklahoma City, Oklahoma, where he was a four-year NAIA All-American and was ranked No. 1 nationally. In 1997 he won top honors as the NAIA Rolex national singles champion. During his time at OCU Winterbotham was also named the 1999 Sooner Athletic Conference Player of the Year in soccer, where he was named to the All-Region first team and honorable mention All-America team. In 2007 Winterbotham was inducted into the Oklahoma Christian Athletic Hall of Fame. He said it took him only one semester at OCU for him to know he wanted to get into coaching tennis.

== Coaching career ==
=== Baylor Assistant Coach (1999–2002) ===
Winterbotham was an assistant coach at Baylor from 1999 to 2002 where he managed to help turn the Bears into a national powerhouse. His global recruiting efforts played an instrumental part in Baylor's 2004 NCAA title.

=== Colorado Head Coach (2002–2006) ===
In 2002, Winterbotham earned his first head coaching job when he was hired to coach Colorado and was tasked with transforming the program into a competitor in the Big 12. During his time at Colorado, the team improved steadily every year. During the spring 2006 season, he guided the team to its first 20-win season since 1997, its first NCAA Tournament appearance since 1988 and a final ITA ranking of No. 23 which was a school record. Despite this success, the men's tennis program was cut following the season because of athletic department budgetary reasons.

=== Tennessee Head Coach (2006–2017) ===
Winterbotham joined the Tennessee Volunteers in 2006 and quickly guided the Vols back to national prominence. He became the first coach in program history to capture back-to-back SEC regular-season titles when the Vols won in 2010 and 2011. In 2010, the Vols broke the school record for shutouts with 16, swept the SEC regular season and conference titles and reached the NCAA team final for the third time in program history. Every season at Tennessee, he has been assisted by former top 30 ATP professional Chris Woodruff. Volunteer assistant coaches have included Milos Popovic, Christopher Williams, Ben Rogers and Ben Testerman.

So far, Winterbotham has accumulated a 178-60 overall record at UT, the most wins for a Tennessee coach in his first seven seasons. That record includes a 64–26 record in the Southeastern Conference, including a 21-1 SEC record from 2010 to 2011. While at Tennessee, Winterbotham has had 16 All-America and 24 All-SEC selections Three of his players have reached the No. 1 national college singles ranking during their careers: John-Patrick Smith (2010), Rhyne Williams (2011) and Miķelis Lībietis (2013). Three doubles teams have also earned the top national ranking

He was voted the 2013 National Coach of the Year by the Intercollegiate Tennis Association for his team's consistent top-10 performances and player development during his first seven seasons. The 2013 Vols reached the NCAA quarterfinals and ended the year ranked sixth nationally, while featuring Libietis at the top of the lineup.

In 2014, Winterbotham coached his first NCAA champions. Miķelis Lībietis and Hunter Reese won the 2014 NCAA doubles title, beating Ohio State's Peter Kobelt and Kevin Metka 7-6 (4), 6-7 (3), 7-6 (6) in the final. Prior to this breakthrough, Winterbotham had coached four NCAA individual finalists: 2008 NCAA Singles – John-Patrick Smith; 2009 and 2010 NCAA Doubles – Smith and Davey Sandgren; and 2011 NCAA Singles – Rhyne Williams.

On 4 May 2017, it was announced that Winterbotham was being relieved of his duties as head coach at the University of Tennessee.

== See also ==
- Tennessee Volunteers
- Oklahoma Christian University
- Colorado Buffaloes
- Baylor Bears
