= Gospel Broadcasting Network =

US broadcast network

- Type: Religious Broadcasting Church of Christ
- Branding: GBN
- Country: United States of America
- Availability: United States, worldwide via internet and apps
- Key people: Don Blackwell, Aaron Gallagher, John Stubblefield, Mike Hixson, BJ Clarke, Cliff Goodwin
- Official website: www.gbntv.org

The Gospel Broadcasting Network (GBN) is an American Christian satellite broadcast network, which broadcasts 24 hours a day, seven days a week.

All of the programming is produced by congregations and ministries affiliated with Churches of Christ. Although organized as a separate 501(c)(3) legal entity, GBN is under the oversight of the elders of the Southaven Church of Christ (Southaven, Mississippi), which serves as its sponsoring church.

The GBN headquarters are in Olive Branch, Mississippi. Programs are recorded at the Olive Branch location, as well as in individual studios of local congregations of Churches of Christ located throughout the country. Syndicated programs that air on GBN include Pulaski, Tennessee (Preaching the Gospel), Edmond, Oklahoma (In Search of the Lord's Way), Dunlap, TN ( Good News Today), McMinnville, TN (The Gospel of Christ), Cantonment, FL (Have a Bible Question), and Maxwell, Texas (World Video Bible School programming).

== History ==
GBN was started by Barry Gilreath Sr. and began broadcasting in November 2005. Jim Dearman worked alongside Gilreath throughout the early years and served as its first Program Director.

Originally based in Chattanooga, Tennessee, GBN relocated to Olive Branch in 2011 (shortly upon Gilreath's death) when the Southaven Church of Christ took over as its sponsoring church. Following Barry Gilreath, Don Blackwell took over as the executive director of GBN in December of 2010.

== Transmission ==
GBN transmits simulcasts over the Internet over GBNTV.org, through its own Roku channel, on Android and iOS devices, and over the air via both low-powered radio stations (all of which are individually owned and operated by local congregations) and television stations (primarily smaller cable networks located in the Southern United States). On April 27, 2011, GBN launched its public Roku channel. In addition to the live GBN broadcast, the channel also contains many archived programs. In June 2012, the GBN Roku channel was one of the 10-highest rated Roku channels with five out of five possible stars.

As of May, 2018, 24 cable companies in six states broadcast the network over their systems.

The January 2007 (IV) Issue of GoodNews reported that the two jails within the Dallas County, Alabama Sheriff's Department will broadcast GBN 17 hours a day (where deputies would like access during down-time 24/7).

== Financial support ==
Unlike many religious networks, GBN does not solicit contributions over the air. (i.e., there are no fund-raising telethons, 'pledge' times, or on-air pleas for financial support). Several of the network's personalities have stated that "...you will never hear a plea for money on this network." GBN further states on its website that it "... is fully supported from the donations of members of the churches of Christ around the world. We do not solicit donations from non-members of the church of Christ." GBN does not accept paid advertisements.

GBN sends out a free newsletter for the network, which covers events, network news, and special memorial and honorarium contributions made since the last newsletter. The newsletter is sent via regular mail upon request, or it can be downloaded from their website.

== Featured programs ==
All of GBN's programming is based on the Bible only, and is produced by local Church of Christ congregations in the United States.

GBN produces a call-in program entitled "GBNLive" hosted by Mike Hixson. It airs on a weekly basis February through May, and during September and October each night at 6PM Eastern and 7PM Central. Joining Hixson on the program are two guests, who are qualified to deal with the subject of that particular episode. Viewers can ask their questions via email, telephone call or through Facebook.

GBN is home to the syndicated TV program Preaching the Gospel. James Watkins was the original host, and Cliff Goodwin has assumed the role after Watkins' retirement. Preaching the Gospel airs on the Christian Television Network (CTN) on Sunday mornings.

Counterpoint is a GBN program that is also syndicated on the Christian Television Network (CTN) and eight local television stations. This program features BJ Clarke and Mike Hixson discussing a Bible subject in a conversational setting.

In Search of the Lord's Way, one of the most widely distributed religious programs in the US (and the largest among churches of Christ), also broadcasts on GBN. Originally created by Mack Lyon (died 2015), Phil Sanders currently serves as the host of this program, for which the Edmond Church of Christ serves as the sponsoring church.

Good News Today began as the flagship program of the Gospel Broadcasting Network. It is a magazine-format program that originally aired segments of other GBN programming and was syndicated on other TV networks. Good News Today continues its format while airing original content in its segments. The work is now overseen by the elders of the Dunlap church of Christ in Dunlap, TN.

The live-action children's program Digger Doug's Underground is the most notable of GBN's children's programs; it is based on the characters from the children's magazine Discovery which is produced by Apologetics Press, an Alabama-based publishing house affiliated with Churches of Christ.

On Sunday mornings, GBN airs "On the Lord's Day", which are pre-recorded worship services from various congregations around the country. This program allows viewers to experience the worship services of Churches of Christ and provides a valuable service for shut-ins throughout the country.

=== Special broadcasts ===
GBN broadcasts a variety of special programming, such as recordings of live events. Below are a few examples of those events.

A celebration of the Hardeman Tabernacle Sermons held at the Ryman Auditorium, Nashville, Tennessee from July 1–3, 2007. The original Tabernacle Sermons, which were held in 1922, 1923, 1928 and 1945, were gospel meetings staged by Nashville Area Churches of Christ. The broadcasts were called the Tabernacle Sermons Today. The event featured speakers Tom Holland, Garland Elkins, Winford Claiborne, James Watkins, B.J. Clarke and Jim Dearman. David Hayes Prophater served as the announcer and Jeff Scott led the audience in a cappella singing.

On September 29, 2011, GBN broadcast the Kyle Butt/Blair Scott debate that was held at the Norton Auditorium on the University of North Alabama campus. In addition to the debate itself, Don Blackwell and Dr. Dave Miller hosted both a pre-debate introduction and a post-debate show that featured interviews with both of the participants. Utilizing new technology, the primary feed of the broadcast was transmitted over the internet to its internet and satellite broadcast providers in North Carolina and Georgia, respectively.

== See also ==
- N.B. Hardeman
- Restoration Movement
