= Oklahoma Christian University =

Private university in Oklahoma City, Oklahoma, US

Coordinates: 35°36′43″N 97°28′13″W

- Former names: Central Christian College (1950–1959); Oklahoma Christian College (1959–1990); Oklahoma Christian University of Science and Arts (1990–1996)
- Type: Private
- Established: 1950
- Religious affiliation: Church of Christ
- Endowment: $32.432 million
- President: Dr Ken Jones
- Administrative staff: 450
- Students: 2,153 (fall 2020)
- Undergraduates: 1,700 (fall 2020)
- Postgraduates: 321 (fall 2020)
- Location: Oklahoma City, Oklahoma, United States
- Campus: Suburban, 200 acres (81 ha)
- Colors: Maroon & Gray
- Nickname: Eagles and Lady Eagles
- Sporting affiliations: NCAA Division II – Lone Star
- Mascot: Eagle
- Website: www.oc.edu
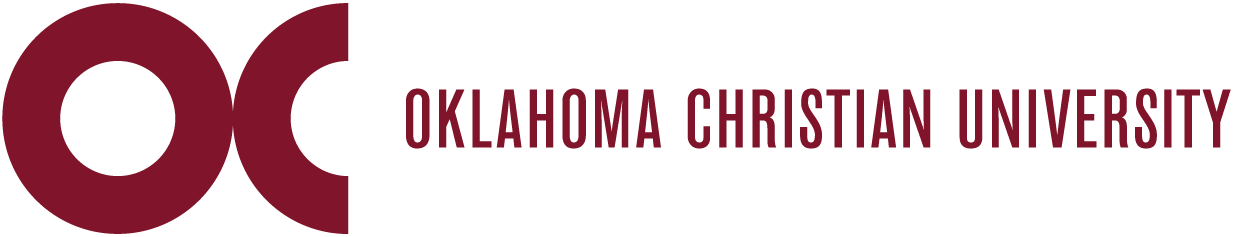

Oklahoma Christian University (OC) is a private Christian university in Oklahoma City, Oklahoma. It was founded in 1950 by members of the Churches of Christ.

== History ==
Oklahoma Christian University, originally named Central Christian College, was founded in 1950 by members of the Churches of Christ. It opened as a two-year college with 97 students in Bartlesville on the 152 acres (62 ha) former estate of Henry Vernon Foster, a prominent oil businessman. L.R. Wilson, who founded Florida Christian College four years before, was the college's first president. Harold Fletcher, who became an OC emeritus professor of music, was the first faculty member hired for the new college. James O. Baird became the school's second president in 1954.

Soon after, plans were made to move the campus to Oklahoma City. Groundbreaking occurred on 200 acres (81 ha) the far north edge of Oklahoma City in 1957 and the university was relocated in 1958. It was renamed Oklahoma Christian College in 1959 and began offering bachelor's degrees, with its first senior class graduating in 1962. Full accreditation was obtained from the North Central Association of Colleges and Schools in 1965.

In the 1990s, the school restructured its academic departments into separate colleges and the name of the institution was changed initially to Oklahoma Christian University of Science and Arts in 1990, before being truncated to Oklahoma Christian University in 1996. In 1981, OC became the sponsor of The Christian Chronicle. In 2014, OC began their Ethos spiritual development program which encourages students to attend any of 26 small chapels.

== Technology ==
In August 2001, OC provided campus-wide wireless Internet service and a personal laptop computer to every full-time student. In 2008, Oklahoma Christian University began providing Apple's MacBook to all full-time students and faculty, alongside the choice of an iPhone or an iPod Touch. Beginning with the fall 2010 semester, students also had the option of choosing an iPad for an additional charge. OC now provides information technology support for a "Bring Your Own Device" model. In 2013, OC's mobile computing program was honored as an Apple Distinguished Program.

== Academics ==
All bachelor's degrees at OC require the completion of at least 126 semester hours. Not less than 30 hours must be earned in courses numbered 3000 or above, including at least 10 hours in the major field. Bachelor's degrees require completion of a core curriculum of 60 semester hours consisting of "basic skills" (14 hours), Bible (16 hours), "basic perspectives" (27 hours) and a 3-hour senior philosophy seminar

The university also offers an honors program; participants are selected by interview.

Through its Office of International Studies, OC offers semester-long study programs in Europe, based in the university's Das Millicanhaus in Vienna, Austria. OC also has shorter study abroad options in Asia and Honduras, plus additional options through the Council for Christian Colleges and Universities (CCCU).

=== Faculty ===
OC employs 94 full-time faculty members, more than 70 percent of whom hold a terminal degree in their respective fields. The undergraduate student-to-faculty ratio is 13-to-1. 83 percent of classes contain fewer than 30 students.

==== Presidents ====
- L. R. Wilson – 1950–1954
- James O. Baird – 1954–1974
- J. Terry Johnson – 1974–1996
- Kevin Jacobs – 1996–2001
- Alfred Branch – 2001–2002
- Mike O'Neal – 2002–2012
- John deSteiguer – 2012–2023
- Ken Jones: 2023 – present

== Athletics ==
The Oklahoma Christian athletic teams are called the Eagles and Lady Eagles. The university is a member of the NCAA Division II ranks, primarily competing in the Lone Star Conference (LSC) since the 2019–20 academic year. They were also a member of the National Christian College Athletic Association (NCCAA), primarily competing as an independent in the Central Region of the Division I level from 2012–13 to 2018–19. The Eagles and Lady Eagles previously competed in the D-II Heartland Conference from 2012–13 to 2018–19; and in the Sooner Athletic Conference (SAC) of the National Association of Intercollegiate Athletics (NAIA) from 1978–79 to 2011–12; and in the Texoma Athletic Conference from 1973–74 to 1977–78.

OC competes in 15 intercollegiate varsity sports: men's sports include baseball, basketball, cross country, golf, soccer, swimming and track & field; while women's sports include basketball, cross country, golf, soccer, softball, swimming, track & field and volleyball. Club sports include men's and women's bowling, cheerleading, men's and women's disc golf, dance, esports and ultimate frisbee. Along with sports, there are also competitive clubs such as chess, engineering, and choir.

== Campus ==
Oklahoma Christian University is approximately 2 miles (3.2 km) west of Interstate 35, just south of the north Oklahoma City suburb of Edmond. The campus spans 240 acres (97 ha) and is bordered by East Memorial Road to the south, Smiling Hills Boulevard to the north, S. Boulevard/N. Eastern Avenue to the west, and Benson Road and N. Bryant Road to the east. The campus has over 30 major buildings, primarily designed in an International and Mid-Century modern architectural style, with red brick and light-colored stone ornamentations.

The main entrance leads to the center of the campus, where the Williams-Branch Center for Biblical Studies (1987) is located, housing Scott Chapel. Adjacent to Scott Chapel is the Mabee Learning Center (1966), which houses the Tom & Ada Beam Library. The Thelma Gaylord Forum (1987), an amphitheatre, is situated between the Williams-Branch Center and the library's front entrance.

To the east of the Mabee Learning Center are OC's earliest buildings, dating from 1959, including Benson Hall (the main administrative building), Cogswell-Alexander Hall (housing the registrar's office and information technology offices), Gaylord Hall (site of the admissions and financial aid offices), and Vose Hall (containing science laboratories and classrooms). These buildings are centered around the university's original quadrangle.

North of the original quadrangle is the Davisson American Heritage (DAH) Building (1970), followed by the Noble Science Wing (2011), Herold Science Hall (housing OC's student undergraduate research program), and the Prince Engineering Center (1988).

The Baugh Auditorium to the east is the primary campus venue for performances and convocations. The McIntosh Conservatory, an open meeting and performance space, connects Baugh Auditorium with the Garvey Center (1978), consisting of Mabee Hall and Kresge Hall. The Garvey Center also houses Judd Theatre for thrust or proscenium theatre productions and Adams Recital Hall. Further east is the Harvey Business Center (1980).

The west side of the campus is primarily dedicated to student residences and recreation. The Gaylord University Center (1976/1997) houses the cafeteria, a snack bar, bookstore, health center, recreation areas, and the Student Life and Student Government Association offices. Adjacent to this center is the Payne Athletic Center (1970), which includes a campus fitness facility, Olympic-size swimming pool, and the Eagles' Nest gymnasium.

Recent additions to the campus are between these buildings and the dormitories on the west. Lawson Commons features McGraw Pavilion, a covered outdoor event space, and the Freede Centennial Tower, a 100-foot-tall (30 m) clock tower commemorating the 2007 Oklahoma state centennial. Additionally, in 2009, the campus received a gift of more than 1,300 trees from a partnership between the Tree Bank Foundation and the Apache Foundation.

In 2013, OC introduced the Boker-Wedel Eagle Trail, a 5 km path encircling the campus. This trail, composed of side-by-side asphalt and crushed granite running paths, spans a distance of 3.1 miles and is equipped with lighting, landscaping, and security phones. It also connects with the Edmond running trails system. The trail system also runs around Memorial Road Church of Christ, a neighbor to OC on the southwest side.

In April 2016, the university unveiled Hartman Place, a scripture garden and waterfall.

Dormitories are on the western end of the campus. Apartment complexes, available to upper-class and married students, are across Benson Road on the east end of campus.

The northernmost portions of the campus contain outdoor venues for soccer, softball (Tom Heath Field at Lawson Plaza), track and field (Vaughn Track), baseball (Dobson Field) and intramural sports.

This campus often has tornados. When inclement weather occurs students must leave the dorm to go gather in safe places. Students are assigned buildings to gather and are not allowed to stay in their apartments and dormitories.

== OC policies ==
OC maintains a commitment to traditional biblical principles as "derived from the Bible".

OC officially recognizes that it “is not the church.” Attendance at OC is open to all students, regardless of religious affiliation, who agree to abide by OC's ideals. Full-time faculty and staff are required to be active members of a Church of Christ. Attendance at daily chapel services is mandatory for all full-time students. OC has an exemption from Title IX regulations prohibiting discrimination based on gender identity or sexual orientation.

In January 2024, after a year of ongoing litigation, Oklahoma Christian University invoked the ecclesiastical (i.e., "relating to the Christian Church or its clergy") abstention doctrine in the case of Michael O'Keefe v. OC. O'Keefe is suing OC over his firing as a tenured professor with 40 years of service to the university. OC announced its intention to use the ecclesiastical abstention doctrine to motion the Court to dismiss the case for lack of jurisdiction. The Court has yet to rule on the issue. Kevin Jacobs, former OC president, is one of the lawyers representing Michael O'Keefe in his suit against OC. This follows a similar case involving a similar school, Florida College; filed by Roy Byers in 2016 over his firing as a tenured professor. After 5 years of ongoing litigation in that case, Florida College invoked the ecclesiastical abstention doctrine. That case was shortly thereafter dismissed without the Court having reached the merits of issue.

== Cascade College ==
OC operated Cascade College, a branch campus in Portland, Oregon, from 1994 until it closed in May 2009. Like OC, Cascade's full-time faculty and the majority of its students were members of Churches of Christ. In 1992, the Oklahoma Christian University Board of Trustees assumed the operation of the former Columbia Christian College after it suffered serious financial difficulties and lost accreditation. A year after Columbia closed, the new branch campus opened in 1994 as Cascade College. The North Central Association agreed that the accreditation of Oklahoma Christian, Oklahoma City, could extend to Cascade if close ties and supervision were maintained. In October 2008, the OC Board of Trustees announced that Cascade College would close after the spring 2009 semester. Bill Goad was the last president of Cascade and is now a professor of business at OC.

== Notable alumni ==
- Cliff Aldridge – former Republican member of the Oklahoma State Senate
- Jim Beaver – film and television actor, co-star of Deadwood and Supernatural
- Jeff Bennett – decathlete who competed in the 1972 Summer Olympics
- Andrew K. Benton – seventh president of Pepperdine University
- Dan Branch (1980) – former member of the Texas House of Representatives from the Dallas area
- Stephanie Byers (1986) - former member of the Kansas House of Representatives
- Sherri Coale (1987) – head coach, University of Oklahoma women's basketball
- Patrice Douglas (1983) – former member of the Oklahoma Corporation Commission
- Joe Clifford Faust (1980) – science fiction author and freelance writer
- Allison Garrett (1984) – former VP for academic affairs (2007–2012); chancellor of Oklahoma State Regents for Higher Education (2021–present), president at Emporia State University (2016-2021),
- Rhein Gibson – professional golfer and Guinness World Record holder
- Roderick Green (2002) – paralympic athlete
- Molefi Kete Asante (under his birth name, Arthur Lee Smith, Jr.; 1964) – scholar of African studies and African American studies at Temple University; founder of the first Ph.D. program in African-American studies
- Greg Lee – actor, host of PBS series Where in the World is Carmen Sandiego? and voice of Mayor/Principal Bob White on Doug.
- Roy Ratcliff (1970) – Christian minister, ministered to Jeffrey Dahmer
- Tess Teague (2012) – former member of the Oklahoma House of Representatives
- Sam Winterbotham (1999) – head coach, University of Tennessee men's tennis
