= Florida College =

Christian college in Temple Terrace, Florida, U.S.

Coordinates: 28.0345593°N 82.383495°W

- Former names: Florida Christian College (1946–1963)
- Motto: Learning, Living, Leading His Way
- Type: Private college
- Established: 1946; 80 years ago
- Religious affiliation: Christian
- Endowment: $11 million
- President: John B. Weaver
- Students: 591
- Location: Temple Terrace, Florida, United States
- Campus: Suburban, 20 acres (8.1 ha)
- Colors: Red & White
- Nickname: Falcons
- Sporting affiliations: NAIA – Continental
- Website: floridacollege.edu

Florida College is a private Christian college in Temple Terrace, Florida, United States. It was founded in 1946. Although it draws its staff, faculty, and most of its students from non-institutional churches of Christ, it is not legally or financially connected to any specific church, group of churches, or religious institution.

== History ==
The campus is located in the center of Temple Terrace, Florida, along the banks of the Hillsborough River. It is surrounded by the Temple Terrace Golf and Country Club, a private country club that opened in 1922. The school occupies land that originally belonged to the club; the college's Sutton Hall was the club's original clubhouse, built in 1922 and one of the oldest buildings in the city. Another historic structure, the circa-1926 Club Morocco Nightclub and Casino (which was connected to Sutton Hall by a now-defunct prohibition-era tunnel), was used as the college's student center until it was razed in 2018 to be replaced by the college's Quad. The primary function of the student center, being the campus mail room, was relocated to the Riverview Center beneath Henderson Dining Hall.

Florida College's Sutton Hall, formerly the Temple Terrace Golf and Country Club, 1920s postcard

Tampa architect M. Leo Elliott was the architect for both buildings which were part of the original Temple Terrace Estates, one of the first Mediterranean Revival golf course planned communities in the United States (1921).

After the 1920s Florida land boom and during recovery from the economic Great Depression, the property and its buildings were acquired in the late 1930s by the Florida Bible Institute from the City of Temple Terrace.

The school's charter was drafted in 1944, and it opened as Florida Christian College in the fall of 1946 with 100 students. The college charter stipulates that each board of trustees member be active in a local, generally non-institutional Church of Christ.

The first president of the school was L.R. Wilson, who served from 1946 to 1949. He was followed by James R. Cope, who remained in office from 1949 until 1982. During the 1950s, the Churches of Christ debated internally whether congregations should support missions or educational institutions. This resulted in a schism and the development of non-institutional Churches of Christ, which do not offer financing to educational institutions. Florida College was unique during these debates as the only college associated with the Churches of Christ which advocated non-institutionalism. Florida College continues to refuse donations from churches. The college supports itself entirely through the donations from individuals and the tuition paid by students.

Throughout the 1950s, the majority of the students were older men who wished to become preachers; according to David Edwin Harrell, the school "became something of a training ground for a cadre of non-institutional leaders". In 1954 the Southern Association of Colleges and Schools granted Florida College full accreditation, which has been reaffirmed about every ten years, most recently in June 2017.

In the 1960s the school's recruitment policies changed, and students outside Churches of Christ were pursued. A vote by the students and staff resulted in dropping the word "Christian" from the school name in 1963. The name change was fueled in part by the controversy that the word Christian was only used as a noun and never as an adjective in the New Testament. By the 1970s the bulk of the student body were again members of Churches of Christ, although the students were younger and more traditional than those of the 1950s. In 1982, Bob F. Owen became president of Florida College, the position he held until 1991, when Charles G. "Colly" Caldwell III, assumed office.

At the beginning of the 2008 academic year, Caldwell announced his resignation as president of Florida College. After a nationwide search, the college's academic dean and vice president, Harry E. "Buddy" Payne, was named the fifth president of the college, effective May 22, 2009. In 2023, John B. Weaver was named the sixth president of the college.

In 2017, Florida College received an exemption to Title IX that allows it to discriminate against LGBTQ students.

== Campus ==
Florida College is located in Temple Terrace, Florida, about 20 minutes northeast of Tampa. The Hillsborough River marks the eastern edge of the main campus, which is bordered on the other three sides by the private golf course land of the Temple Terrace Golf and Country Club. Across the Hillsborough River, the college has Conn Gymnasium and its athletic fields. Next to the gym is Florida College Academy, an affiliated private school for students pre-kindergarten through ninth grade.

The main campus includes one of the oldest buildings in the city: Sutton Hall, built around 1922 as the clubhouse for the Temple Terrace Golf and Country Club. The former Student Center, razed in 2018, was built around 1926, and served as the Club Morocco Nightclub and Casino. Tampa architect M. Leo Elliott designed both buildings. Economic collapse in 1926 forced their closure as recreational leisure facilities and the property passed to the Florida Bible Institute during the Great Depression. The land was then later purchased by the founders of Florida College.

The Hutchinson Auditorium, a mid-century modern building in Temple Terrace, cost $100,000 to build and opened on March 5, 1961. The architect was Garry Boyle of Tampa and the structure was built by the Paul Smith Construction Co. of Tampa with financing largely provided by the Hutchinson family.

Two new residence halls were begun during the 2007–2008 school year and completed in the first half of the 2008–2009 academic year. Boswell Hall, which holds 320 beds, is five stories tall. All on-campus men live in Boswell. Five-story Jennifer Hall provides a 90-bed residence hall for women. This supplements the other residence hall for women, Hinely Hall, and replaces the condemned Sutton Hall.

In 2013, a project was undertaken to renovate the condemned building known as "C Dorm", the primary male dorm before Boswell. The project was completed over the summer months of 2013 and dedicated on September 22. The renovated building, now known as "College Hall", houses women of junior and senior standing.

== Academics ==
Florida College offers 17 bachelor's degrees in the fields of biblical studies, business, communication, education, music, English, history, and liberal studies, as well as an Associate of Arts degree. The college is accredited by the Southern Association of Colleges and Schools. All undergraduates take biblical courses as part of their liberal arts curriculum. The student-to-faculty ratio is 11 to 1.

=== Rankings ===
Florida College was ranked #68 (tie) in the Regional Colleges South category of the 2022–23 Best Colleges rankings by U.S. News & World Report.

== Recruitment ==
Although most of its students are members of churches of Christ, Florida College does not recruit through churches since the school is founded on the principles of the non-institutional churches of Christ, which per its doctrine does not engage in congregational support of colleges. Instead, the school gains name recognition by offering 21 one-week summer camps annually in locations across the United States. About 4,000 children attend the summer camps, with about 400 volunteers to teach and entertain them.

== Student life ==
Florida College draws students from all 50 U.S. states, though primarily states to the south, and several foreign countries. For the 2023–24 academic year, 591 students were enrolled, representing 33 states, Puerto Rico, and 12 countries. Ninety percent are members of non-institutional Churches of Christ. In many instances, both of a student's parents attended and met at Florida College.

Brief devotional chapel services are held on weekdays during the academic calendar year, which all students are required to attend.

Students are expected to adhere to a Code of Moral Conduct. As set forth in the 2022–23 Student Handbook, the code forbids "sexual relationships of any type outside of marriage," "inappropriate physical contact that is sexually sensual, whether on or off campus," and being "alone with a member of the opposite sex in a private place". Students are expected to avoid immoral environments such as "restaurants known for the immodest dress of staff" and "any establishment that serves alcohol and checks identifications at [the] door."

Students are required to live on campus until they reach the age of 21 or have been in college for two years out of high school, unless they live with their parents or with relatives who have been approved by the college. Residence halls are segregated by gender with each off limits to members of the opposite sex except in lobbies during posted hours.

== Athletics ==
The Florida College athletic teams are called the Falcons. The college is a member of the National Association of Intercollegiate Athletics (NAIA), primarily competing as an NAIA Independent within the Continental Athletic Conference since the 2021–22 academic year. They were also a member of the United States Collegiate Athletic Association (USCAA) until the 2017–18 school year. The Falcons previously competed in the Southern States Athletic Conference (SSAC; formerly known as Georgia–Alabama–Carolina Conference (GACC) until after the 2003–04 school year) of the National Association of Intercollegiate Athletics (NAIA) from 2018–19 to 2020–21.

Florida College competes in 11 intercollegiate varsity sports: Men's sports include basketball, cross country, golf, soccer and track & field (outdoor); while women's sports include cheerleading, cross country, golf, soccer, track & field (outdoor) and volleyball.

The 2021–22 men's basketball team won the Continental Athletic Conference (CAC) Championship en route to the NAIA National Tournament. In the national tournament, the 9-seeded Falcons defeated the 8-seed Evangel University 75–72, for the first NAIA National Tournament win in school history.

== Academy ==
The college president and board of directors administer Florida College Academy (FCA), a K–12 private school on the Temple Terrace campus which serves about 360 students. FCA shares the athletic facilities, and participates in the Tampa Bay Christian Athletic League.

== See also ==
- Churches of Christ (non-institutional)
- Independent Colleges and Universities of Florida
