= Barry Stowe =

American business executive (born 1957)

- Born: Barry Stowe; November 1957 (age 67); Nashville, Tennessee, US
- Education: Lipscomb Academy (1975); Lipscomb University (1979)
- Occupation: Businessman
- Board member of: Zurich Insurance Group
- Children: 3 daughters

Barry Stowe (born November 1957) is an American business executive. He held senior positions at leading insurance companies, including Prudential plc and American International Group (AIG).

== Early life and education ==
Barry Stowe was born in November 1957, a seventh-generation Nashvillian.

He is a graduate of Lipscomb Academy, and Lipscomb University, where he received a bachelor of arts in politics and classical studies in 1979. Stowe was named as Lipscomb’s alumnus of the year in 2009, and in 2014, the College of Business dedicated an auditorium in his honor.

== Career ==
In 1980, following Stowe’s graduation from Lipscomb, he joined Corroon & Black, a Nashville-based insurance firm that later merged with Willis Faber to form Willis Corroon Group. In 1992 he joined Nisus, a subsidiary of Pan-American life, and was ultimately appointed its president and CEO.

In 1995, Stowe joined AIG where he held several senior positions, including being president of AIG Life Companies Accident & Health Worldwide, a Hong Kong-based business unit that generated over $2 billion of earnings in 2005.

=== Prudential ===
In 2006 Stowe joined the global insurer Prudential plc as chief executive officer of Prudential Corporation Asia, a subsidiary operating in 14 markets in Asia. During his tenure he led a transformation resulting in a material increase in profitability{Prudential plc Annual Report 2015}. In June 2015, after 20 years of experience in global markets, he returned to Nashville after being named chairman and CEO of Prudential's North American businesses, including Jackson National Life and its affiliates, National Planning Holdings, and the institutional asset manager PPM America. In 2018, he announced his retirement. Stowe was a member of the board of directors and the group executive committee of Prudential plc from October 2006 to December 2018. He still acts as a senior advisor for the group.

=== Boards and committees ===
In April 2019, Stowe was appointed as a member of the board of directors of Zurich Insurance Group, one of the world’s largest insurers. He is a member of the Sons of the American Revolution, and the 30% Club.{30% Club directory}

He previously served on the boards of Life Office Management Association (LOMA), American Council of Life Insurers (ACLI), and numerous other organizations. He was the chairman of Save the Children{Save the Children Hong Kong public filings 2015}. He was a trustee of the Hong Kong International School and Harpeth Hall School in Nashville. He Chairs the Board of Trustees of {(Cheekwood Botanical Garden and Museum)}

== Personal life ==
Barry Stowe has three daughters, all of whom reside in New York City.
