= Spectrum, Bristol =

Office building in Bristol, England

Spectrum
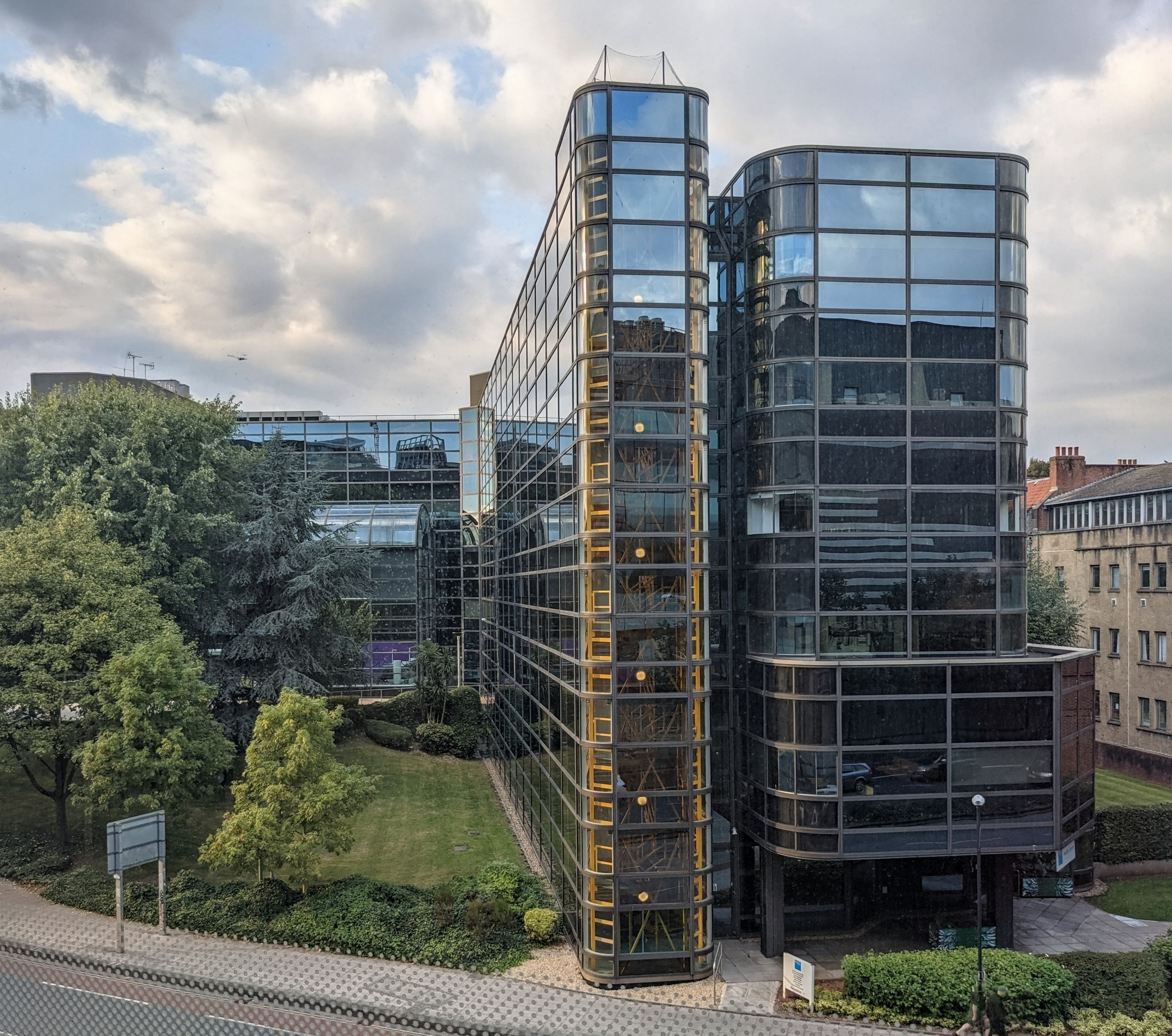
- Interactive map of the Spectrum area
- Alternative names: Spectrum House

General information
- Type: Office building
- Architectural style: Modern
- Location: Bristol, England, United Kingdom, Bond Street, Bristol, BS1 3LG
- Coordinates: 51.459789°N 2.586331°W
- Construction started: 1982
- Completed: 1984
- Opened: Autumn 1984
- Cost: £9 million
- Client: Prudential plc

Technical details
- Floor count: 5
- Floor area: 34,747 m²
- Lifts/elevators: 5

Design and construction
- Architecture firm: BGP Group Architects
- Structural engineer: Keith Parsons Partnership
- Quantity surveyor: Banks Wood & Partners
- Main contractor: Espley-Tyas Construction
- Designations

Locally Listed Building
- Official name: Spectrum House
- Designated: 1 September 2016
- Reference no.: 292

Website
- spectrumbristol.co.uk

Spectrum is a five-storey modern office building in Bristol, England, designed by BGP Group Architects and completed in 1984. Located on Bond Street near Cabot Circus, the building is clad in reflective blue glass and aluminium frames in a style typical of 1980s British commercial architecture. Its stepped form was intended to reduce visual impact on adjacent listed buildings and reflect contemporary priorities in workplace design. The façade and massing of the building soon earned it local nicknames such as the Glass Palace, Glasshouse, and Yellow Submarine. Though regarded as bold and innovative at the time, its design has since attracted mixed critical reception.

== History ==
The Spectrum building was developed between 1982 and 1984 on a site formerly occupied by 19th-century streets and buildings, including the Bunch of Grapes public house and the Stonehouse music venue. Initial redevelopment proposals emerged in the 1970s and underwent significant revisions owing to the site's inclusion in the Portland and Brunswick Square Conservation Area. Early schemes would have contained housing and hotel elements, but these were eventually replaced by a fully commercial scheme, which itself was originally intended to be clad in brick. The final design, approved after extensive consultation, features a five-storey all-glass curtain wall structure that steps down to three and four storeys along Pembroke and Gloucester Streets.

=== Construction and opening (1982–1984) ===
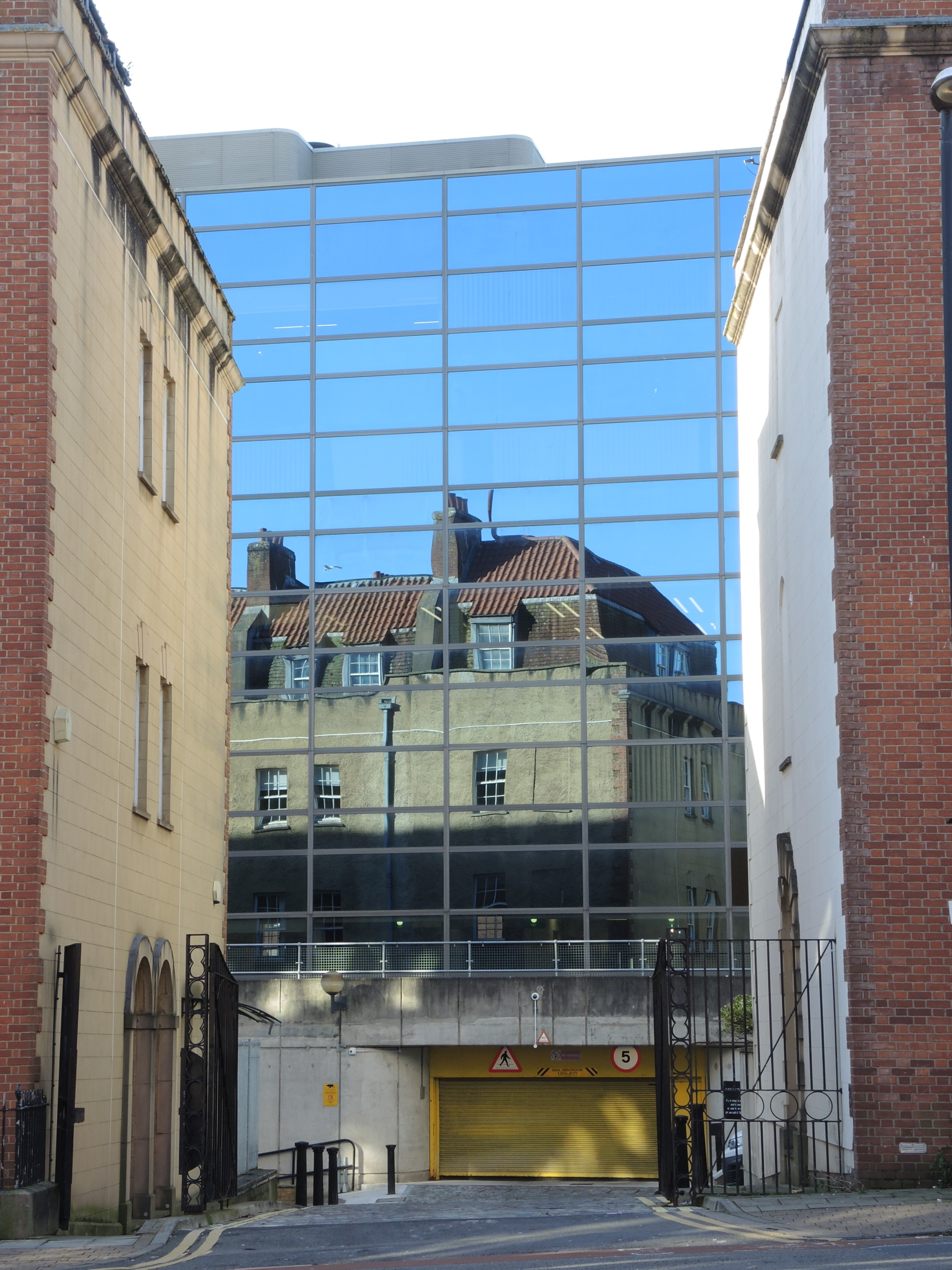
Underground car park for Spectrum, viewed from the intersection of Norfolk Avenue and Pritchard Street. The Georgian architecture that characterises the enveloping conservation area is also evident here.

Work on site began in late 1982 under Midlands-based developer Espley-Tyas. Contemporary reports placed the construction cost between £8 million and £9 million, substantially higher than early estimates of £6 million, with an investment valuation of some £14 million on completion. Marketing agents Hartnell Taylor Cook promoted Spectrum as the "most advanced mid-size office building between Bristol and West London", with anticipation of a single occupier.

Although practical completion was achieved in June 1984, the official opening reception was deferred to later in the year to avoid the summer holiday season, and the building initially stood empty. Commentators noted that few multinational firms sought large high-specification offices outside the capital, prompting the developer to consider subdividing the floorplates if no sole tenant emerged. Meanwhile, the three-storey entrance lobby, designed to include tropical planting, was fitted out as a marketing suite.

=== Glazing difficulties and remedial works ===
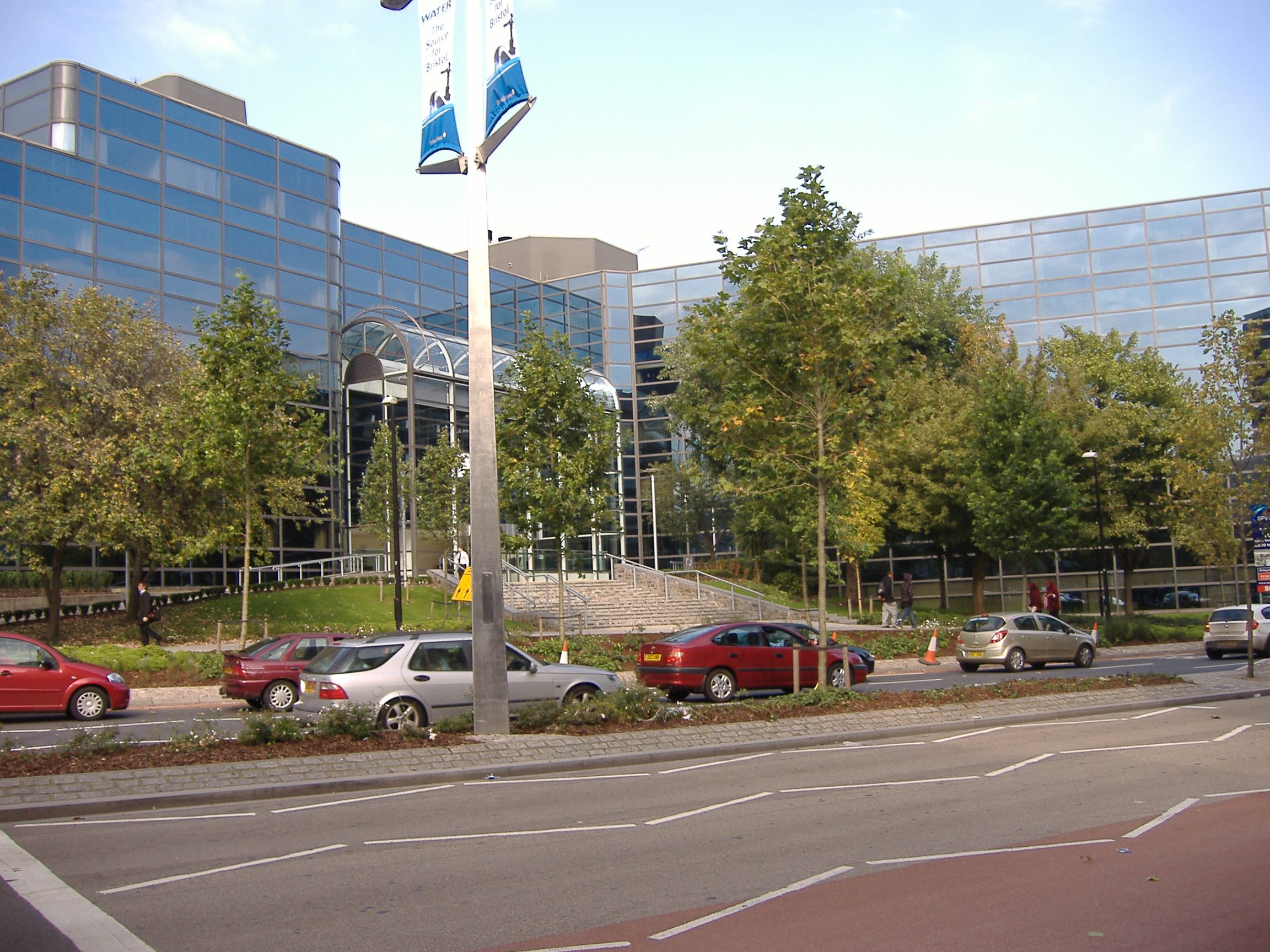
Spectrum viewed from the other side of Bond Street, where Cabot Circus is located.

In the weeks before the opening, contractors discovered that many of the blue-tinted double-glazed units exhibited streaking and dark shadows. Initially treated as dirt accumulated during transportation from Germany, the marks were soon suspected to be condensation trapped between the panes, raising the prospect of wholesale replacement at a cost of several hundred thousand pounds. Espley-Tyas commissioned chemists at the University of Bristol to identify the cause and devise a cleaning method; their recommendations, implemented in early 1985, largely resolved the problem without full replacement. Later criticisms of the glass were given by architectural scholar John Punter, who describes the façade as "tear-stained" in appearance after reacting with insulation materials.

=== Ownership changes and letting ===
Financial difficulties at the parent company led to Stock Exchange suspension of Espley Trust shares in January 1985, but a restructuring deal allowed work on Spectrum to continue. Shortly afterwards, Prudential Assurance acquired the freehold, and active marketing resumed. While full occupation was not achieved until the late 1980s, early lessees praised the building's raised floors, advanced HVAC, and energy-saving solar-heated water system that offset its night-time illumination.

Tenants since the 1990s have included Morgan McKinley, Civica, Bupa Healthcare, and the RAC Legal Services Division. The RAC's in-house legal service, among the first major occupants, was based in Spectrum during a widely reported 1985 litigation case.

In October 2025, a proposal to convert the building to student accommodation was submitted to Bristol City Council. The plan has since met opposition from the Bristol Civic Society, who fear a risk of the building losing its character under the current needs of the student housing market.

== Architecture ==
Spectrum's curtain wall employs reflective glass mounted in aluminium frames, combining high solar gain with an internal water-duct heat-exchange system. The plan form angles to track the Bond Street frontage, where the landscaped courtyard exists to break up the building's massing, while recessed upper floors and a tiered roofscape lower the perceived mass when viewed from Portland and Brunswick Squares. Internally, a glazed dome marks the foyer, formerly planted with tropical species, and connects to a mezzanine café. Two service cores now allow subdivision into multiple tenancies. Underground parking for 110 cars was a condition of planning approval, intended to minimise street parking in the conservation area.
