= Clark Manning =

American actuary (born 1959)

- Born: Clark Preston Manning Jr. 1959 (age 66–67)
- Known for: former CEO of Jackson National Life, 2002–10

Clark Preston Manning Jr. (born 1959) is an American actuary and business manager. He was president and CEO during 2002–2010 of Jackson National Life, an insurance company located in Lansing, Michigan. He also was on the board of directors of Prudential plc, during 2002–2010. (Note: Jackson National Life was one of the top 20 life insurance companies in the U.S., and was/is a wholly owned subsidiary of U.K.-based Prudential plc. Prudential plc, not affiliated with U.S.-based Prudential Financial, was then the second largest U.K. life insurance company and pension annuity provider. Prudential plc is a public company that is traded on the NYSE and was/is among the largest 50 public financial companies, world-wide.) He is chairman of the board of directors of PPM America, Inc., a subsidiary of Prudential plc.

Manning was born in approximately 1959.

He obtained a bachelor's degree (B.B.A.) in actuarial science at University of Texas. And also at University of Texas, he completed an M.B.A. He holds professional designations of Fellow of the Society of Actuaries (FSA) and Member, American Academy of Actuaries (MAAA). His activity in the Society of Actuaries included publishing a 1990 article on changes in valuation law, based on a panel discussion that he led.

Manning worked as a consulting actuary in the Chicago office of Milliman & Robertson, Inc., before joining SunAmerica, Inc. In the mid-1990s, he was listed as senior vice president of NYC-based life insurance company SunAmerica, Inc. SunAmerica, which also is described as a retirement savings company, was acquired by AIG in 1999. He served as senior vice president and as chief actuary.

He joined Jackson National Life in 1995, as the senior vice president and the chief actuary during 1995 to 1998, then as chief operating officer during 1998 to 2001. After being acting CEO from June 2001, he was appointed CEO of Jackson National Life in late 2001, saying then that he planned to follow "an aggressive strategy of expanding Jackson's distribution capabilities and product line." He was CEO through 2010, in that year earning $2.1 million compensation. After stepping down from CEO of Jackson National Life in 2010, Manning was to be an adviser through the end of 2011. Tidjane Thiam, CEO of Prudential plc, praised Manning's for leaving at JNL "a strong legacy, having put together over the years a first-class management team and achieved excellent results...".

Manning also was an analyst at Prudential Equity Group's Research Division (part of U.S.-based Prudential Financial and entirely unrelated to U.K.-based Prudential plc) at some point in his career.

In 2015, he is a director and chairman of the board of directors of PPM America, Inc., a major investment management firm, which like Jackson National Life is a subsidiary of Prudential plc.
