= QNB =

QNB may refer to:

- QNB Bank, an independent bank headquartered in Quakertown, Pennsylvania
- QNB Finansbank, a bank headquartered in Istanbul, Turkey
- QNB Group, a commercial bank headquartered in Doha, Qatar
- 3-Quinuclidinyl benzilate
