= Eastspring Investments =

Singapore based asset manager

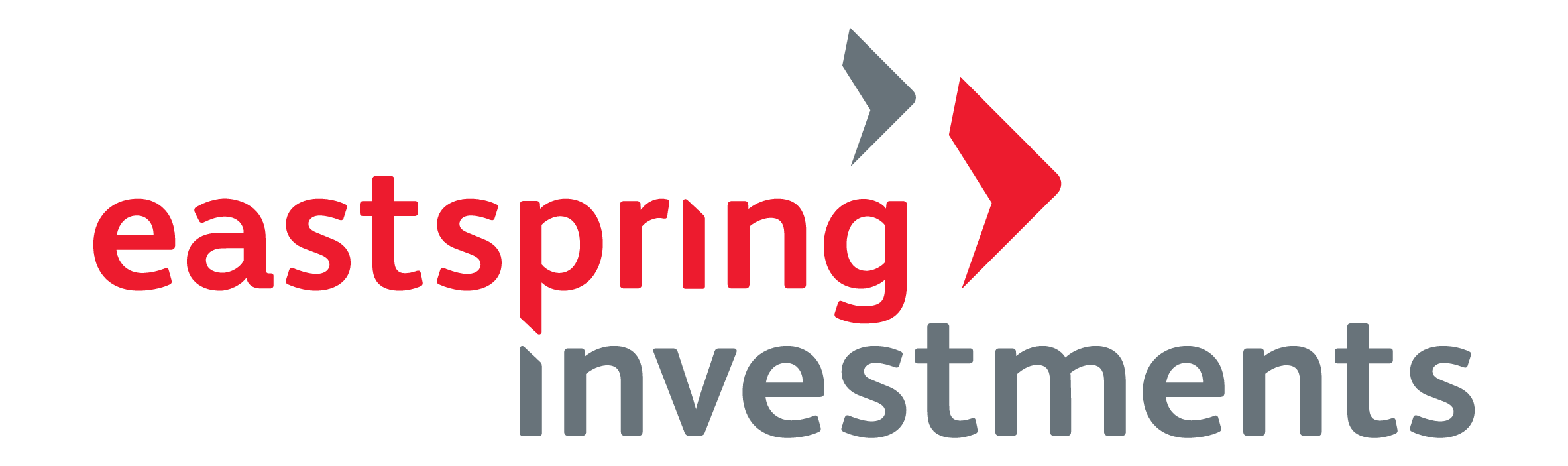

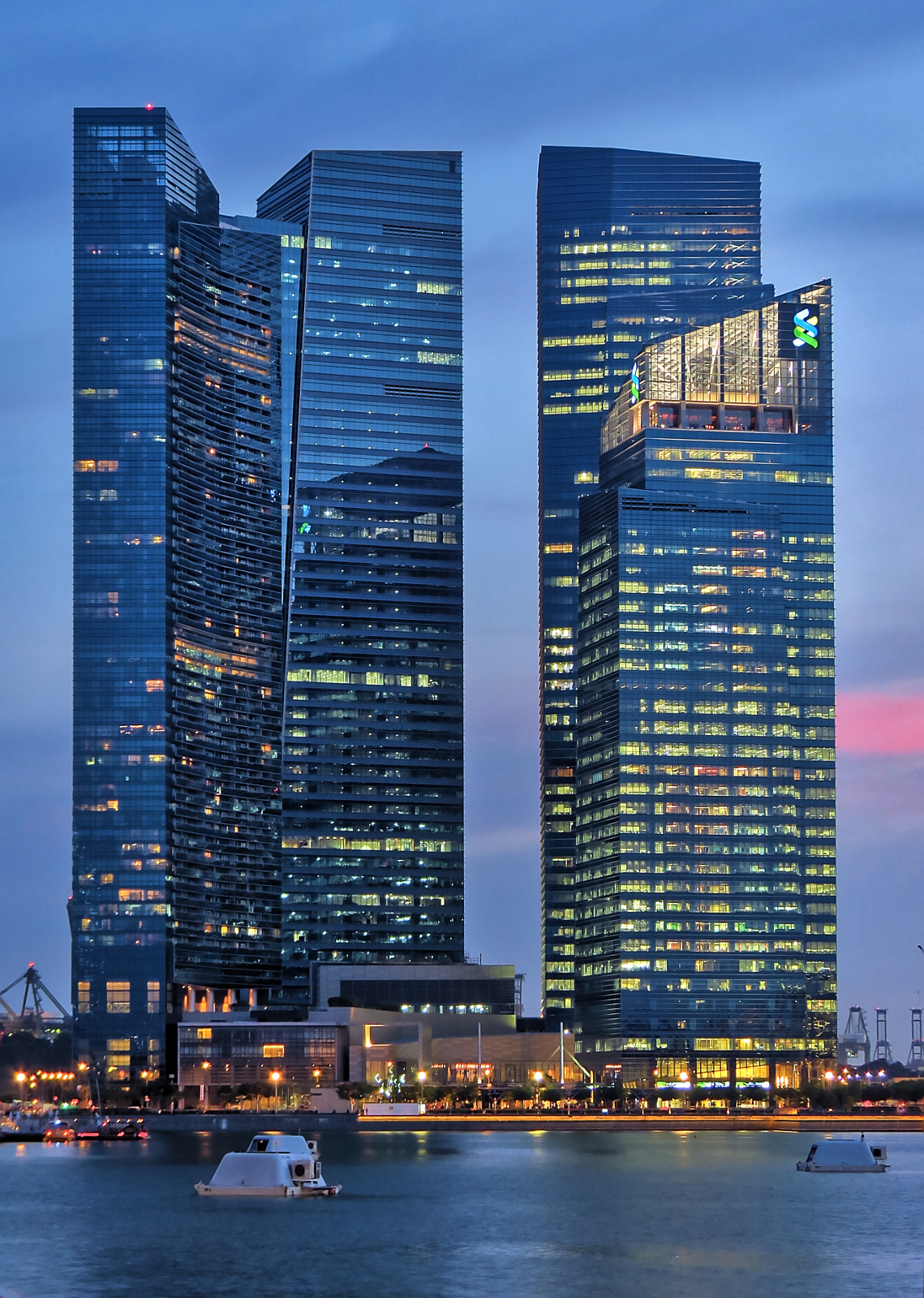
- Headquarters at Marina Bay Financial Centre
- Type: Subsidiary
- Industry: Investment management
- Founded: 1994; 32 years ago
- Headquarters: Marina Bay Financial Centre, Singapore
- Number of locations: 11 markets in Asia
- Key people: Rajeev Mittal (CEO)
- AUM: US$291 billion (2026)
- Number of employees: ~400 (2023)
- Parent: Prudential plc
- Website: www.eastspring.com

Eastspring Investments (also known as Eastspring) is an investment management firm headquartered in Singapore that is focused on investments throughout Asia. It is a subsidiary of Prudential plc.

== History ==
Eastspring was originally the investment management arm of Prudential Corporation Asia, the Asian branch of Prudential plc that was established in 1994.

In 1998, it formed a joint venture with ICICI Bank named ICICI Prudential Mutual Fund which is located in Mumbai and is currently one of the largest asset management companies in India.

In 1999, it formed a joint venture with BOC International named BOCI-Prudential Asset Management to provide services for Mandatory Provident Fund scheme in Hong Kong.

In 2005, it formed a joint venture with CITIC Group named CITIC-Prudential Fund Management Company which is based in Shanghai.

In 2009, it established Eastspring Al-Wara' Investments Berhad in Malaysia to enter the Islamic Finance business.

In 2011, the investment management arm was rebranded to have its own separate brand name, Eastspring Investments. There were various reasons for the business to operate under its own brand name. Fifty percent of its assets under management from third parties rather than Prudential itself. There were also legal constraints on using the name "Prudential" to label the firm or its products as Prudential Financial, a non-related US company already had the legal rights to use the name. Finally the business had little name recognition in the United Kingdom and at the time, Prudential already had an investment management arm set up there named M&G.

In July 2018, it acquired 65% of TMB Asset Management from TMBThanachart Bank in Thailand. It made a further acquisition in Thailand in September 2019, where it acquired 50.1% of Thanachart Fund Management from Thanachart Bank for $137m In 2022, all Thailand entities were merged into one entity forming Eastspring Asset Management (Thailand) Company Limited.

== Business overview ==
Eastspring is focused on 10 markets in Asia and is headquartered in Singapore. Although its business is mainly in Asia, it has additional distribution offices in North America and Europe.

Eastspring focuses on four asset classes: Equity, Fixed Income, Multi Asset Solutions and Quantitative.
