= Invest Financial Corporation =

- Type: Private company
- Industry: Financial services
- Founded: 1982
- Founder: Dan McConnell
- Defunct: 2018
- Fate: Acquired
- Successor: LPL Financial
- Headquarters: Tampa, Florida, United States
- Key people: Steve H. Dowden, President & CEO
- Products: Financial services, stocks & bonds, mutual funds, fixed & variable annuities
- Revenue: $237 million USD (2012)
- Number of employees: 165 (2018)
- Website: www.investfinancial.com

Invest Financial Corporation was an American broker/dealer that operated between 1982 and 2018 when it was acquired by LPL Financial.

Invest supervised and supported both financial institutions and independent registered representatives who offered advisory services, investment and insurance products. Invest was formed in 1982 under Dan McConnell and was the first firm to offer securities inside a bank lobby.

By 2018, Invest had over $24 billion in assets managed by over 1,200 Advisers who are registered with Invest. Invest’s total registered advisers accounted for 1,136 full-time advisers and 274 part-time advisers in approximately 150 Financial Institutions. Invest Corporate Office was located in Tampa, Florida and employed over 165 staff members who supported financial advisers.

== History ==
Formed and solely owned by Dan McConnell in 1982, Invest Financial was later bought by Brentwood Securities. Brentwood changed its name to Investment Services for America (ISFA) – ISFA Holding Company. Kemper Financial, a major shareholder of ISFA sold Invest to First American National Bank in 1996. First American National Bank was then bought by AmSouth Bank in mid-1999.

In 2000, Invest was sold by AmSouth Bank to National Planning Holdings (NPH) and is still a subsidiary of the corporation. Under the NPH umbrella, in 2004, Invest implemented EOE software and E-Sign technology. EOE is a network of online forms, electronic blotters, and basic compliance checks that representatives use when working with clients. E-Sign, a part of EOE, allows representatives to get client signatures for documentation on an electronic pad, eliminating paperwork.

=== Key dates ===
- 1982 – Founded and solely owned by Dan McConnell, DBA Evergreen Securities. Bought by Brentwood Securities. Changed name to Investment Services for America (ISFA) – ISFA Holding Company. ISFA Holding bought by Coast Federal Savings and Loan and other Savings and Loans.
- 1985 – Kemper Financial becomes major shareholder of ISFA.
- 1992 – Invest exceeds 1000 reps
- 1996 – Zurich Kemper Investments sells Invest to First American National Bank. Invest acquires broker dealer ICA.
- 1999 – First American National Bank bought by AmSouth Bank; Rob Jacobsen is first Invest rep to exceed $1 Million.
- 2000 – AmSouth Bank sells Invest to National Planning Holdings.
- 2004 – Electronic Order Entry (EOE) and E-Signature (E-Sign) are introduced.
- 2005 – Invest exceeds $100 Million mark in revenues
- 2007 – Acquired PFIC Contracts
- 2008 – Paperless mutual fund processing.
- 2009 – Steve Dowden becomes CEO
- 2011 – Over 20 Representatives reach $1 Million
- 2018 – February 14, 2018, Invest closes after being sold to LPL Financial.

== Affiliations ==
Invest Financial Corporation was a subsidiary of National Planning Holdings, Inc. (NPH) a broker-dealer holding company headquartered in Santa Monica, California. NPH was the holding company for four broker-dealers – Invest, National Planning Corporation, Investment Centers of America, and SII Investments, Inc. NPH was an affiliate of Jackson National Life Insurance Company (Jackson), headquartered in Lansing, Michigan.

NPH and Jackson were indirect subsidiaries of Prudential plc, a company incorporated and with its principal place of business in the United Kingdom.

=== Other ===
Invest had relationships with two independent clearing firms in the U.S. for brokerage accounts and processing trades – National Financial Services, LLC, a wholly owned subsidiary of Fidelity Investments and Pershing, LLC, a subsidiary of the Bank of New York Company, Inc.
