= Castle Park View =

Apartment building in Bristol, England

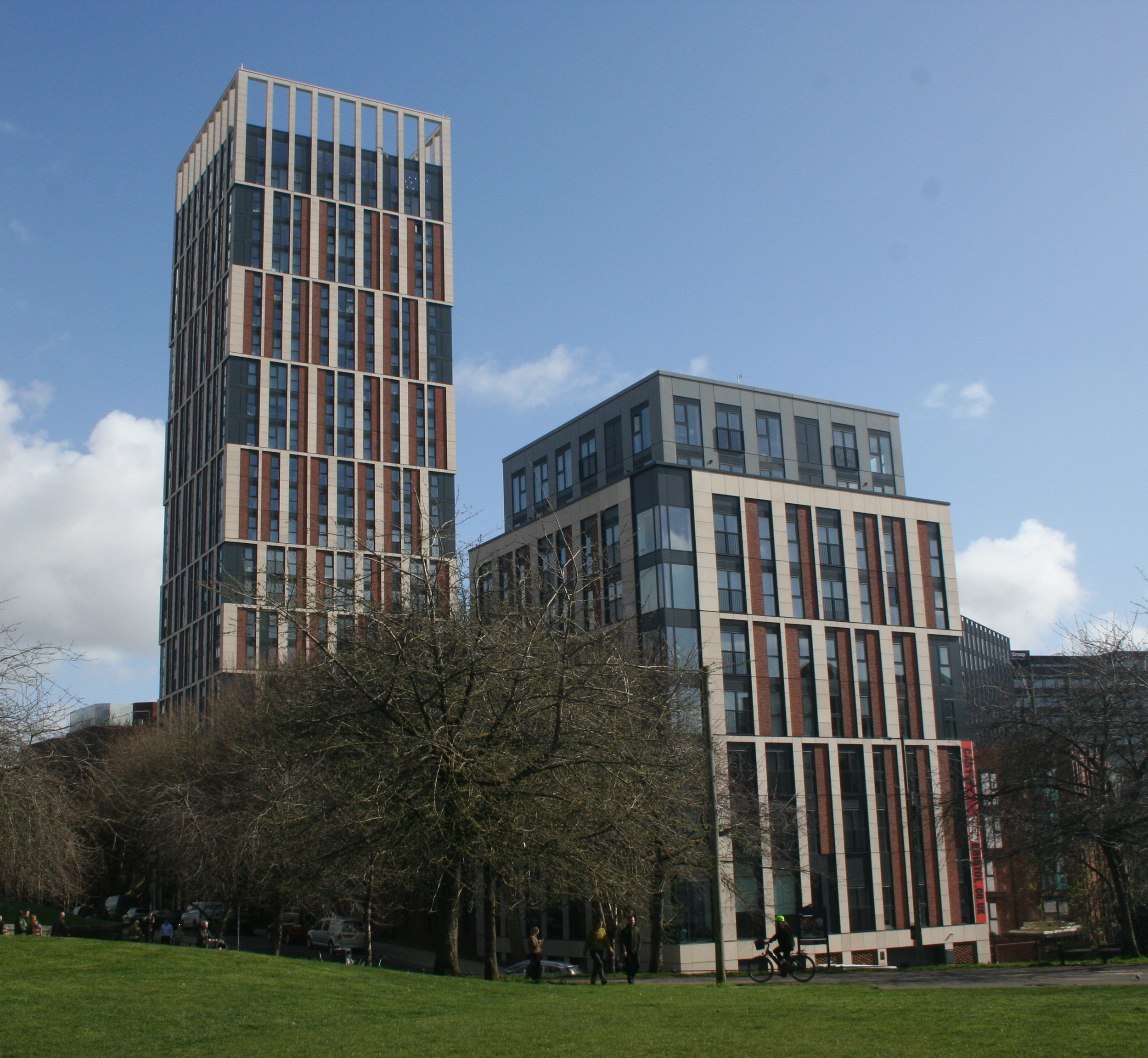
- Interactive map of the Castle Park View area

General information
- Status: Completed
- Type: Apartment complex
- Architectural style: Contemporary modern
- Location: Castle Street and Tower Hill, Bristol, England
- Coordinates: 51.455°N 2.5854°W
- Construction started: 2019
- Topped-out: 2020
- Completed: 2022
- Opened: 2022
- Cost: £96 million
- Operator: M&G Real Estate (300 private rent); Abri Housing Association (75 affordable homes)

Height
- Architectural: 86.6 m (284 ft)
- Roof: 80.4 m (264 ft) (Note: Calculated from the 86.6 m tower height given in the 2017 Tall Buildings Assessment and the 6.17 m difference between the top of the structure and roof level reported in 2020 (98.37 m and 92.2 m respectively).)

Technical details
- Floor count: 26
- Floor area: 29,373 m^{2} (316,170 sq ft)

Design and construction
- Architecture firm: Chapman Taylor; Novell Tullett (landscaping)
- Developer: Linkcity (Bouygues UK)
- Structural engineer: Arup
- Services engineer: Hydrock
- Quantity surveyor: Currie & Brown
- Main contractor: Bouygues

Other information
- Number of units: 375

Castle Park View is a high-rise residential development at the south-eastern edge of Castle Park in Bristol, England, located on the site of the former Central Ambulance Station. Completed in 2022, it comprises five blocks containing 375 flats in total, arranged around a courtyard and anchored by a 26-storey tower designed by Chapman Taylor. Of the flats, 300 are for private rent and 75 are affordable homes.

The tower is 86.6 m (284 ft) high, or 98.37 m (322.7 ft) above ordnance datum (AOD). The tower overtopped the spire of St Mary Redcliffe during construction and is Bristol's tallest occupied building, as well as the first of the new wave of city-centre high-rises to be completed after the relaxation of earlier guidance on tall buildings.

== History ==
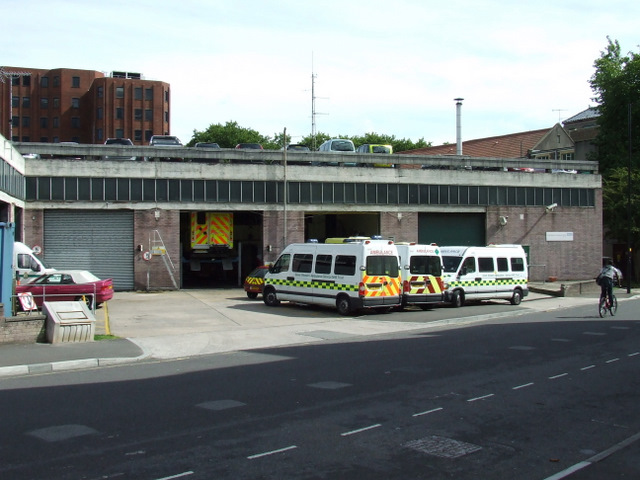
The Central Ambulance Station, designed by City Architect Albert H. Clarke and opened in 1966, which formerly occupied the site

The site stands between Castle Street, Tower Hill, Queen Street, and Marybush Lane, on land long associated with the former castle precinct and later with the city's post-war rebuilding. Before redevelopment it was occupied by the Central Ambulance Station, begun in 1958 and opened in 1966. By the 2010s the plot, jointly owned by Bristol City Council and Homes England, had lain vacant for some years following the station's redundancy and demolition.

Redevelopment of the site was contentious from the outset. Because it was publicly owned and in the city centre, the level of affordable housing became a central issue. Early versions of the scheme offered about 12 per cent affordable housing, well below Bristol's policy target for central sites. Negotiations eventually increased this to 20 per cent, amounting to 75 homes.

Planning permission for the Chapman Taylor scheme was granted in late 2017. The proposal was supported in principle by the Bristol Civic Society, which favoured housing-led reuse of the derelict site, but the society, together with the Old Market Community Association, objected to the scale of the approved scheme. It argued that the tower would intrude on the street scene, diminish the Old Market Conservation Area, dominate views from Castle Park, and dwarf the cupola of the former Methodist Central Hall. By mid-2018 the consented scheme was under offer to M&G Real Estate as a forward-funded development reportedly valued at about £100 million.

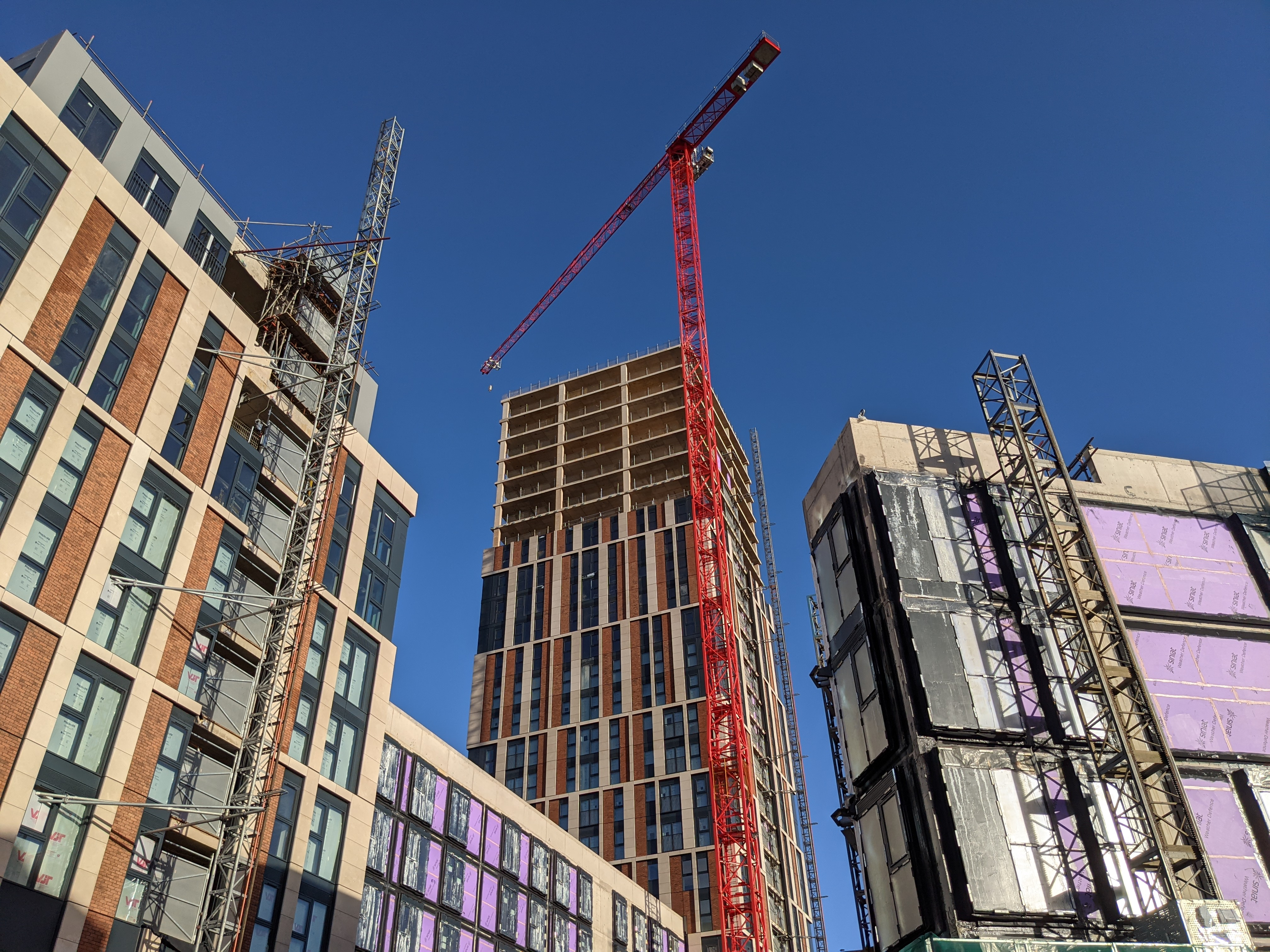
The complex under construction in December 2020

Construction began in 2019. Because the site lies within the former setting of Bristol Castle and beside the culverted segment of the River Frome and castle moat, the groundworks were archaeologically monitored. Excavation exposed substantial 17th-century masonry north of the moat, including a long sandstone-rubble wall with reused dressed stone, nearly 20 metres in recorded length and, in places, standing to about 6 metres high, together with shorter cross-walls and cellar remains. The wall appears to have formed the rear line of post-Civil War tenements laid out along the edge of the former moat.

By the end of 2019 the tower had risen above the restored spire of St Mary Redcliffe, ending a height record that had stood since 1872. The structure topped out in 2020, show flats were unveiled in 2021, and the completed scheme was handed over in 2022.

=== 2025 fire ===
At roughly 17:20pm BST on 20 May 2025, the Avon Fire and Rescue Service (AF&RS) were called to a fire that broke out in a block of flats located on the Castle Park View development facing Marybush Lane. The fire service sent teams from the Temple, Bedminster, Southmead, Kingswood, Patchway and Avonmouth areas to aid in the situation. 10 residents on the fourth floor were rescued who were then treated for smoke inhalation; all residents of the development were accounted for with no other injuries were reported. The fire was put out shortly there after, however, 188 evacuated residents across 75 flats were unable to return to their homes for the next few days due to the development not having any power or water, in addition to suffering from water damage according to the tower block managers, Abri Housing Association. The stated cause of the fire was attributed to the accidental ignition of a charging electric bike or e-scooter.

== Architecture ==
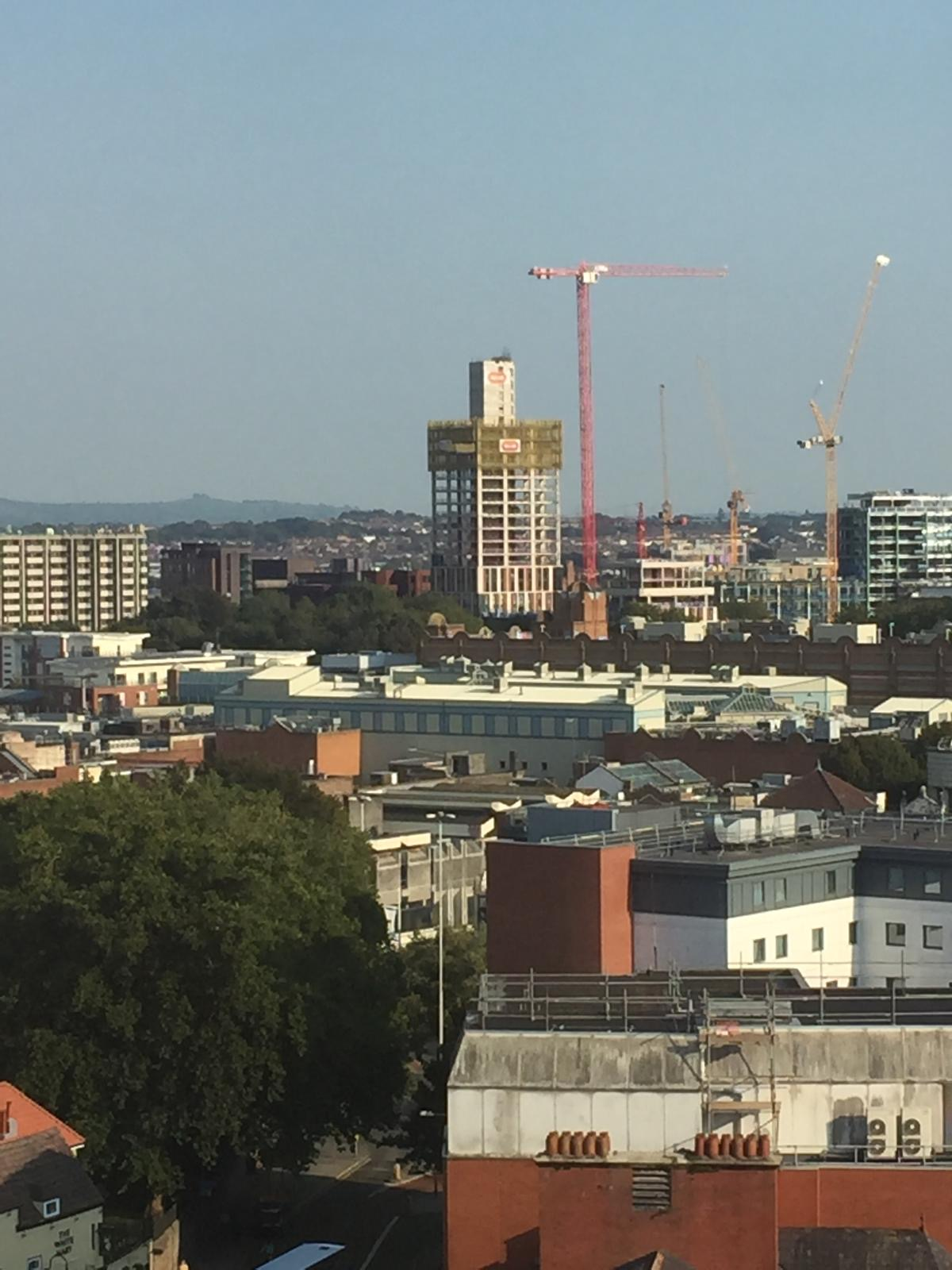
The tower under construction in its wider setting

Castle Park View consists of a group of apartment blocks arranged around a central courtyard, with the main 26-storey tower and a lower block of about 10 storeys linked by intermediate ranges that continue the frontage towards Castle Park. Block C is the 86.6 m (284 ft) tower, which also measures about 98 m (322 ft) AOD. From the onset the scheme was planned as a major element in the reshaping of the eastern side of the city centre around Castle Park and Temple Way.

The massing was shaped by the constrained site. The ground falls by about 6 m (20 ft) from Castle Street to Marybush Lane, while the east-west line of the culverted former castle ditch, or moat, helped determine the disposition of the blocks, with undercroft parking and servicing beneath the northern range and the southern blocks stepping down the slope to admit more light to the central courtyard. The scheme was set out with Block A at 10 storeys, Block B at 6 storeys, Block D at 5 storeys, and Block E at 6 and 7 storeys, with the tower (Block C) placed on the northern part of the site to preserve views and reduce overshadowing of both Castle Park and the internal amenity space.

The façades are treated in strong vertical bays, combining pale framing members of moca creme stone, brick-faced cladding, and dark window bands. Chapman Taylor linked the long northern frontage with the line of the old castle wall, while the 6-metre castellated crown at the summit was intended as an allusion to the fortifications that once occupied the site.

Parts of the façade were altered during construction to meet the stricter fire-safety regime that followed the Grenfell Tower fire. Glazed spandrel panels originally proposed for parts of the envelope were replaced with non-combustible metal panels, and the brick-faced cladding system was designed to satisfy the requirements for high-rise residential construction.

Castle Park View was the first commercial development to connect to Bristol's district heat network. Heat is drawn from the Floating Harbour by a water-source heat pump at Castle Park and distributed to connected buildings through underground pipes. The scheme also incorporated photovoltaic panels and brown roofs intended to support biodiversity.

== Use and reception ==
The completed development contains 300 private-rented flats and 75 affordable homes. Of the affordable homes, 17 were assigned for shared ownership and 58 for rent through Bristol's HomeChoice system, in a separate block managed by Abri. When the first lettings were announced in 2022, the asking rents for the private units drew criticism in the context of Bristol's housing crisis.

From the planning stage onward, the tower stood at the centre of Bristol's argument over tall buildings. The Bristol Civic Society and the Old Market Community Association objected that a 26-storey tower on the site would harm the street scene and detract from the Old Market Conservation Area. The Bristol Civic Society remained critical after consent was granted. Writing in the society's magazine Better Bristol, John Frenkel argued that the site was more suited for a dense low-rise scheme stepping down from the Lower Castle Street blocks towards the river, and that the approved development would instead dominate the south-eastern corner of Castle Park. In 2024 the campaign group Bristol Views cited Castle Park View as the first completed example of the city's new generation of high-rises and called for a halt to further tall buildings. Nick Thursby, one of the directors at Chapman Taylor, stated he was proud of the tower and justified it as "no taller than some of its neighbouring buildings [in Bristol]," believing it respectfully fitted the city's skyline.

Another point of criticism concerned the treatment of the affordable block. During development the scheme was presented as avoiding the visible separation associated with some mixed-tenure schemes, but after completion residents in the affordable block complained that they were excluded from several communal amenities in the main tower, including the dining room, concierge, and rooftop terrace.

Its design has also been criticised. The tower was nominated in the longlist for the 2024 Carbuncle Cup, an annual competition meant to award the ugliest building in the United Kingdom completed within the last 12 months, with the tower described as "looking like a giant Travelodge gone wrong".

== See also ==
- List of tallest buildings and structures in Bristol
