= PPM America, Inc. =

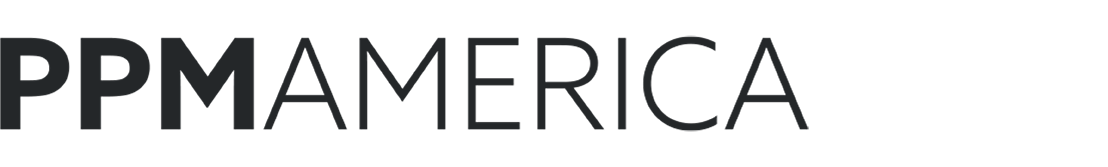
- Company type: Subsidiary
- Industry: Investment Management
- Founded: 1990; 36 years ago
- Headquarters: 225 West Wacker Drive, Chicago, Illinois, U.S.
- AUM: US$ 70 billion (June 30, 2023)
- Number of employees: 220 (2023)
- Parent: Jackson National Life
- Website: www.ppmamerica.com

PPM America, Inc. is a U.S.-based investment management firm that is registered with the SEC as an investment advisor. It managed $9.7 billion assets in 1990 and in 2014 managed $106 billion in assets.

== Overview ==
It is a subsidiary of U.K.-based Prudential plc, one of the largest publicly traded financial firms, in the top 50 worldwide. A large share of its assets under management are investments of Jackson National Life, another Prudential plc subsidiary. In 2015, Clark Manning is chairman of its board of directors. However, an ADV filing indicates Manning was deleted and Michael Andrew Wells was added, in role of director and chairman of the board, as of 1/2011, reported 3/31/2011.

It has a long-term lease of space within the 31-story 225 West Wacker Drive building, a "beige-and-glass tower" built during 1985-89.

== History ==
The firm was plaintiff in 1994 court case PPM America, Inc. v. Marriott Corp., 4th Circuit. This was due to events beginning in 1992 by Marriott Corp. to split into two entities, giving all $2.4 billion of its debt to one of them, the less profitable, to be burdened with interest costs at 2/3 its cash flows. This was unanticipated, and caused immediate drop in market value of the debt by 30 percent. In 1993, a revised restructuring plan was announced that moved $450 million debt to the other entity, which was accepted by all creditors but PPM America, Inc., which held $120 million of debt issued in April, 1992. Marriott sued for securities fraud.

The firm built a distressed securities investment group during the 1990s, which was characterized as a vulture investor for specializing in bankrupt or bankruptcy-risk firms. In 1999, it had positions in about 40 such firms, with $900 million invested, with a large enough percentage stake in about a third of those firms for it to have control or very significant influence on workout terms. Comparable investors included: Cerberus Capital Management, Oaktree Capital Management, Contrarian Capital Management, Canyon Partners, Appaloosa Management, DDJ Capital Management.

It was listed among the Chicago Tribune's survey of employees of area as a "top" workplace in 2011, amidst 17 in the small business category. In 2013, the firm had 227 employees and was rated best of 39 "top" small business workplaces in the survey.
