= Mike Wells (businessman) =

- Born: Michael Andrew Wells; April 9, 1960 (age 66); Canada
- Education: San Diego State University
- Occupation: Businessman
- Title: Group CEO, Athora
- Term: 2022-
- Spouse: married
- Children: 2

Michael Andrew Wells (born April 9, 1960) is an American businessman. He was the chief executive of Prudential plc, a British multinational life insurance and financial services company, from 2015 to 2022. Wells joined Athora, a European savings and retirement group, in July 2022, where he is Group CEO.

== Early life ==
Wells graduated from San Diego State University with a Bachelor of Science degree.

== Career ==
After graduating, Wells spent ten years working for a variety of financial services firms in the US, including Wood Logan, Smith Barney, McGinness & Associates and Dean Witter.

Wells joined the Prudential Group in 1995 as president of Jackson National Life Distributors, part of the Group's US arm, Jackson National Life. He spent 20 years in a variety of senior positions at Jackson. He was appointed as Jackson's CEO in January 2011, at which time he also joined the board of Prudential, Jackson's UK-based parent company. During Wells's four-year tenure as CEO of Jackson, it became the largest seller of variable annuities in the US.

In June 2015, Wells succeeded Tidjane Thiam (who left to become CEO of Credit Suisse) as Prudential Group CEO on a pay package worth up to £7.5 million. In March 2016, he announced Prudential's first full-year results since taking over as CEO, showing that the group made operating profits of £4 billion in 2015, 22% higher than the year before. He sought to reassure shareholders over business in Asia, and China in particular, in 2016. "I think China and Asia in general are misread by the West," he told CNBC. "The consumers have money, are spending...all of the key metrics around our average client are very resilient."

In April 2017, Wells was voted number one insurance CEO in the Institutional Investor All-Europe Executive Team rankings.

In April 2018, Wells became a member of the International Advisory Panel of the Monetary Authority of Singapore.

In March 2018, Wells announced that M&GPrudential was to be demerged from the Group; the demerger was completed on October 21, 2019.

Wells retired as CEO of Prudential on March 31, 2022.

In July 2022, Wells joined Athora, a European savings and retirement services group backed by Apollo Global Management, where he is Group CEO. His appointment at Athora was confirmed in September 2022 following the receipt of regulatory approvals.

== Personal life ==
Wells was born in Canada but has US citizenship. He is married with two adult sons. Wells owns a Tennessee cattle ranch and collects Gibson guitars.
