= Nic Nicandrou =

Chief Financial Officer - Prudential Plc

Nicolaos Andreas Nicandrou was the chief executive officer of Prudential Corporation Asia, a subsidiary of Prudential plc. He was formally the chief financial officer of Prudential plc in the United Kingdom.
