= One Redcliff Street, Bristol =

Office building in Bristol, England

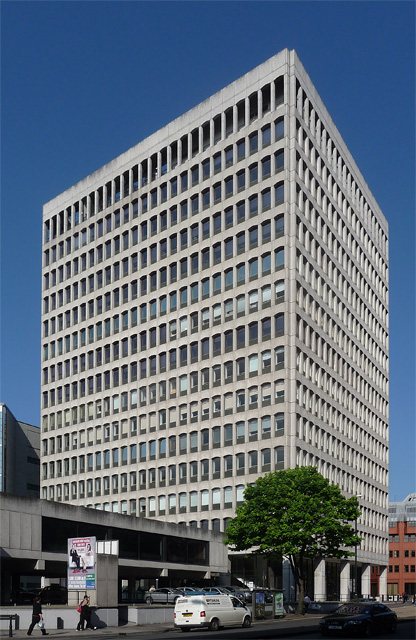
- One Redcliff Street seen from Victoria Street

- Location within Bristol
- Former names: Robinson Building
- Alternative names: 1 Redcliff Street

General information
- Status: Completed
- Type: Office
- Architectural style: Modernist
- Location: 1 Redcliff Street, Redcliffe, Bristol BS1 6TP
- Coordinates: 51.453°N 2.591°W
- Construction started: 1961
- Completed: 1963
- Renovation cost: £15 million (2016)
- Client: E. S. & A. Robinson
- Landlord: Schroders (as of 2024)

Height
- Height: 64 metres (210 ft)

Technical details
- Structural system: Reinforced concrete, clad in concrete panels
- Floor count: 16

Design and construction
- Architects: John E Collins; Colin Beales
- Architecture firm: Group Architects DRG
- Structural engineer: Sir Robert McAlpine
- Other designers: Climate control by GN Haden & Sons
- Quantity surveyor: E. T. Wraight
- Main contractor: Sir Robert McAlpine

One Redcliff Street, Bristol, England, formerly known as the Robinson Building, is a modernist high-rise built in 1964 as the headquarters of local paper and packaging manufacturer E. S. & A. Robinson. The company had been based on the site since 1846.

The names of the building and its associated street are often misspelt as "Redcliffe" from confusion with the alternate rendering of the word, used for the enveloping Redcliffe district.

== History ==
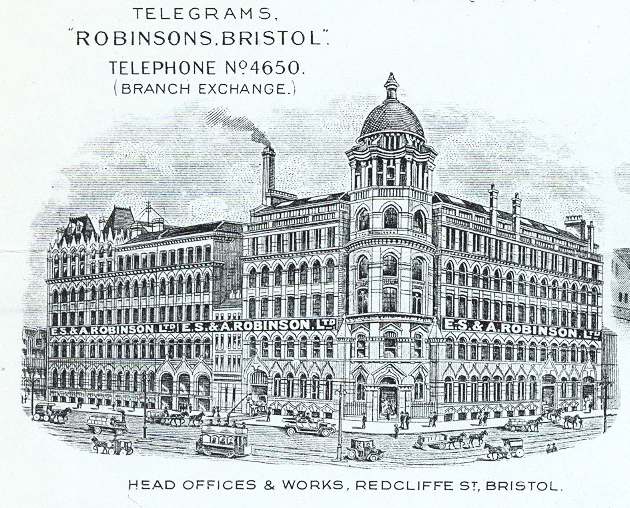
Illustration of the E. S. & A. Robinson building on Redcliff Street in Bristol, constructed 1876 and demolished in 1961.

E. S. & A. Robinson commissioned the tower after bombing in the Bristol Blitz damaged their former Victorian neo-gothic offices. The firm required space for over 1,000 employees and conference facilities, prompting a state-of-the-art design with open-plan floors and air conditioning, among the first of its kind in Britain. A temporary full-scale mockup of the building's façade was constructed in 1962 before work began in earnest, completing in 1963. Staff moved into the completed tower in 1964.

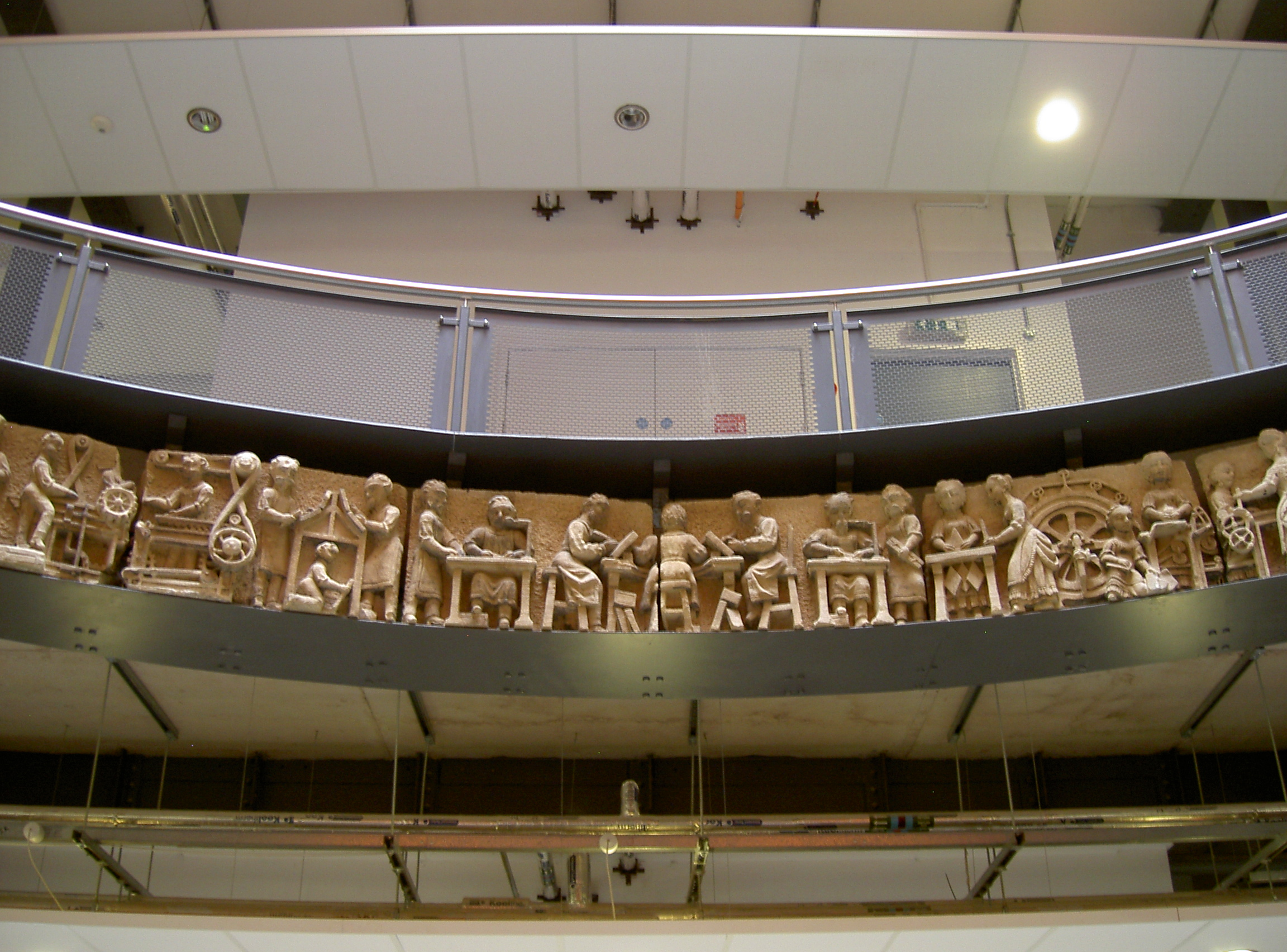
The frieze from the original building, now in the Robinson Building, Bedminster.

A frieze from the original building depicting industrial workers was preserved and donated to Bristol Museums upon demolition in 1961, and was later relocated to the atrium of the former Robinson warehouse in Bedminster following its conversion into apartments.

Following a 1966 merger, the building became part of the Dickinson Robinson Group, before ownership passed to successive landlords.

The building was considered for the Statutory List of Buildings of Special Architectural or Historic Interest in 2007, but the application was refused.

In 2016, a £15 million refurbishment added a 16th floor and created new reception and client areas for law firm TLT LLP. The redesign introduced sustainable features such as rooftop solar panels and improved thermal efficiency. The firm now occupies approximately 90,000 sq ft across multiple floors.

== Design ==
The building was designed in a utilitarian modernist style, with an exposed concrete frame clad in prefabricated panels. Conference and training rooms are housed in a podium structure and a fully glazed foyer set behind external columns. The building features structural mullions and precast wall panels finished with white Carrara marble aggregate. Bronze-framed glazing is recessed behind the façade. Its segment-headed windows intentionally emulate the Victorian warehouse vernacular of post-war Bristol, in a nod to the Robinson company's heritage.

Though its boxy form and its height were divisive, it exemplified 1960s attitudes toward urban renewal and functionalist architecture and was the first building of its kind in Bristol. Although receiving positive feedback from Basil Spence, who called it “a gift to the city”, the design was executed entirely by the in-house team at Group Architects DRG (Dickinson Robinson Group). Group Architects DRG was later acquired by BGP Group Architects.

== Tenants ==
One Redcliff Street is home to several major firms. Law firm TLT LLP occupies the 4th, 7th, 8th and 10th–16th floors of the building and Patent & Trade Mark Specialists Withers & Rogers LLP occupies the 9th and part of the 5th with the rest of the floor being vacant. The 2nd floor is occupied by HP Inc.. Refurbished upper floors were offered for lease in 2024, featuring exposed service ceilings and flexible office configurations. Other tenants include Booking.com and Aon.

== See also ==
- List of tallest buildings and structures in Bristol
- E. S. & A. Robinson
