= Steve Lockshin =

Financial advisor and author

- Born: 1966 (age 59–60)
- Occupations: financial advisor, entrepreneur and financial author

Steve Lockshin is an American financial advisor, entrepreneur and financial author that has focusing on ultra high-net-worth clients and estate planning.

He is a founder of a number of companies, such as Fortigent (formerly Convergent Wealth Advisors and CMS Financial Services) in 1994, Advizent in 2012 (which shut down a year later), and Advice Period in 2013 (which was named "Best Wealth Planning Firm" at Family Wealth Report Awards 2019).

He is an early investor in a number of fintech firms, such as Betterment, Quovo, Wealthbox, and Advizr. He has appeared widely in the finance and business press, and at conferences in the financial services and fintech industries. He has served on CNBC's Digital Financial Advisor Council.

Lockshin has criticized the financial services industry for its inherent conflicts of interest, its over-reliance on active investing, its low standards, and its excessive fees. (He contends that estate planning and tax planning are much more important for clients.) He argues that many investment advisors should not be trusted. He is critical of broker-dealers because they are not required to act in their clients best interests, unlike a registered investment advisor who is a fiduciary.

== Career ==
Lockshin was CEO for Convergent Wealth Advisors for 18 years (and chairman through 2014), during which time the company became one of the largest RIAs in the industry. In 2011, while he was at Convergent, he was named the "No. 1 Independent Financial Advisor" in the United States by the financial weekly newspaper Barron's. Lockshin resigned as Convergent chairman in 2014, after the suicide of its CEO David Zier.

== Awards and Recognitions ==
Lockshin has been recognized repeatedly by Barron's for his excellence as a financial advisor, including as #1 in California twice and #1 nationally. His awards and recognitions include:

- Barron’s Top Financial Advisors 2013 – State by State (#1 in California)
- Barron’s Top Independent Advisors 2012 (#2 Nationally)
- Barron’s Top Financial Advisors 2012 – State by State (#1 in California)
- Barron’s Top Independent Financial Advisors 2011 (#1 Nationally)
- Barron’s Top Independent Financial Advisors 2010 (#5 Nationally)
- The Wealth Management Industry Award for RIA Thought Leader of the Year for 2019

== Writing ==
Lockshin has written articles for CNBC, and writes a regular column in Barron's called The Tech Whisperer. He wrote the book Get Wise to Your Advisor, which exposes conflicts of interest in the financial advice industry, and argues that individual investors, even very wealthy ones, are often not well-served by their advisors.

He has made a number of predictions about the future of the financial services industry, including that over the next few years there will be a rapid evolution of fintech, and that this will result an increased focus on and need for "unconflicted advice." He predicts that investment automation will be disruptive, making it ever harder for investment advisors to compete with robo advice and AI, and the big financial firms who use them. He has said that the financial services industry is having a "Kodak moment," meaning that much of the industry, and especially individual investment advisors, are ignoring technological changes just like Kodak ignored the photography industry transitioning from film to digital.
