= BGP McConaghy Architects =

British architectural firm

- Formerly: R. A. Gallannaugh & Partners (1950 – 1967); Beardsworth Gallannaugh & Partners (1967 – 1975); BGP Group Architects (1975 – 1999)
- Company type: Private (to 2002); Private limited company (2002 – 2016)
- Industry: Architecture
- Founded: 1950 (as R. A. Gallannaugh & Partners), 2012 as BGP McConaghy Architects
- Founder: Roger A. Gallannaugh
- Defunct: 1 November 2016
- Fate: Dissolved
- Headquarters: Bristol, England
- Area served: United Kingdom
- Key people: Roger A. Gallannaugh (partner); Neville Beardsworth (partner, 1967 – 1999); Ian E. McConaghy (director, 2002 – 2016)
- Services: Architectural design; Urban planning; Conservation

BGP McConaghy Architects was an architectural firm based in Bristol, England. Its history dates back to the late-1940s firm of R. A. Gallannaugh & Partners; Through successive mergers and re-brandings the practice operated under several names, including Beardsworth Gallannaugh & Partners and BGP Group Architects, before adopting the title BGP McConaghy Architects in 1999. The company was formally incorporated in 2002 and dissolved in 2016.

== History ==
=== R. A. Gallannaugh & Partners ===
R. A. Gallannaugh & Partners was established in Weston-super-Mare in 1950. The firm first came to wider notice when partner Neville Beardsworth received a Ministry of Housing and Local Government gold medal for the Woolavington Estate in Bridgwater in 1967.

=== Beardsworth Gallannaugh & Partners ===
Following Beardsworth's admission to the partnership, the practice adopted the joint title Beardsworth Gallannaugh & Partners (BG&P). BG&P became closely associated with the phased redevelopment of Nailsea town centre in North Somerset, designing retail, residential and office components between 1971 and 1976. In 1976, the architects oversaw construction of the five-storey tower block in Nailsea town centre, the town's tallest building. In 1974 the practice completed a Bristol office block incorporating an early whole-building heat-recovery system, highlighted in Concrete Quarterly as a response to the 1973 oil crisis.

=== BGP Group Architects ===
In mid-1975 BG&P merged with DRG Group Architects, designers of One Redcliff Street, forming BGP Group Architects. In the same year the new firm's Bristol United Press Building on Temple Way received a Royal Institute of British Architects regional commendation for its planning, detailing, and public engagement. Embracing historic fabric as well as new commissions, in November 1984 BGP Group Architects relocated from their 1974 Welsh Back offices into a newly refurbished Georgian townhouse on Old Market Street, marking their contribution to Bristol's conservation year. Projects of the BGP era ranged from commercial interiors to large-scale industrial work, including the £16 million modernisation of Courage Brewery next to Bristol Bridge in 1986. and the 88,500 sq ft Courage offices in Staines-upon-Thames (1987). The glass-clad Spectrum building at the end of the M32, completed 1984, attracted both praise and criticism but consolidated the firm's reputation for speculative office design. In 1992 BGP absorbed Bristol practice Peter Smith & Partners, broadening expertise in conservation and leisure work. Notable commissions in the 1990s included the restoration of the Talbot Building, a Bristol Byzantine landmark damaged in the Bristol Blitz (1993), and an award-winning renovation of the 18th-century Belvedere folly at Alderley, Gloucestershire (1998).

=== BGP McConaghy Architects ===
In March 1999 BGP merged with Worcester practices Rowe Elliott & Partners and McConaghy Rowe to create BGP McConaghy Architects. The new partnership led by Gerald Wood, Roger Gallannaugh, Ian McConaghy and Henry Lugton combined Bristol and Worcester offices and continued BGP's focus on sports and educational facilities. Early commissions included the Jessop Stand at Bristol County Ground and a £2 million stand at Sixways Stadium for Worcester Rugby Club. BGP McConaghy Architects Ltd was incorporated on 29 April 2002. The company ceased trading and was formally dissolved on 1 November 2016.

== Notable projects ==
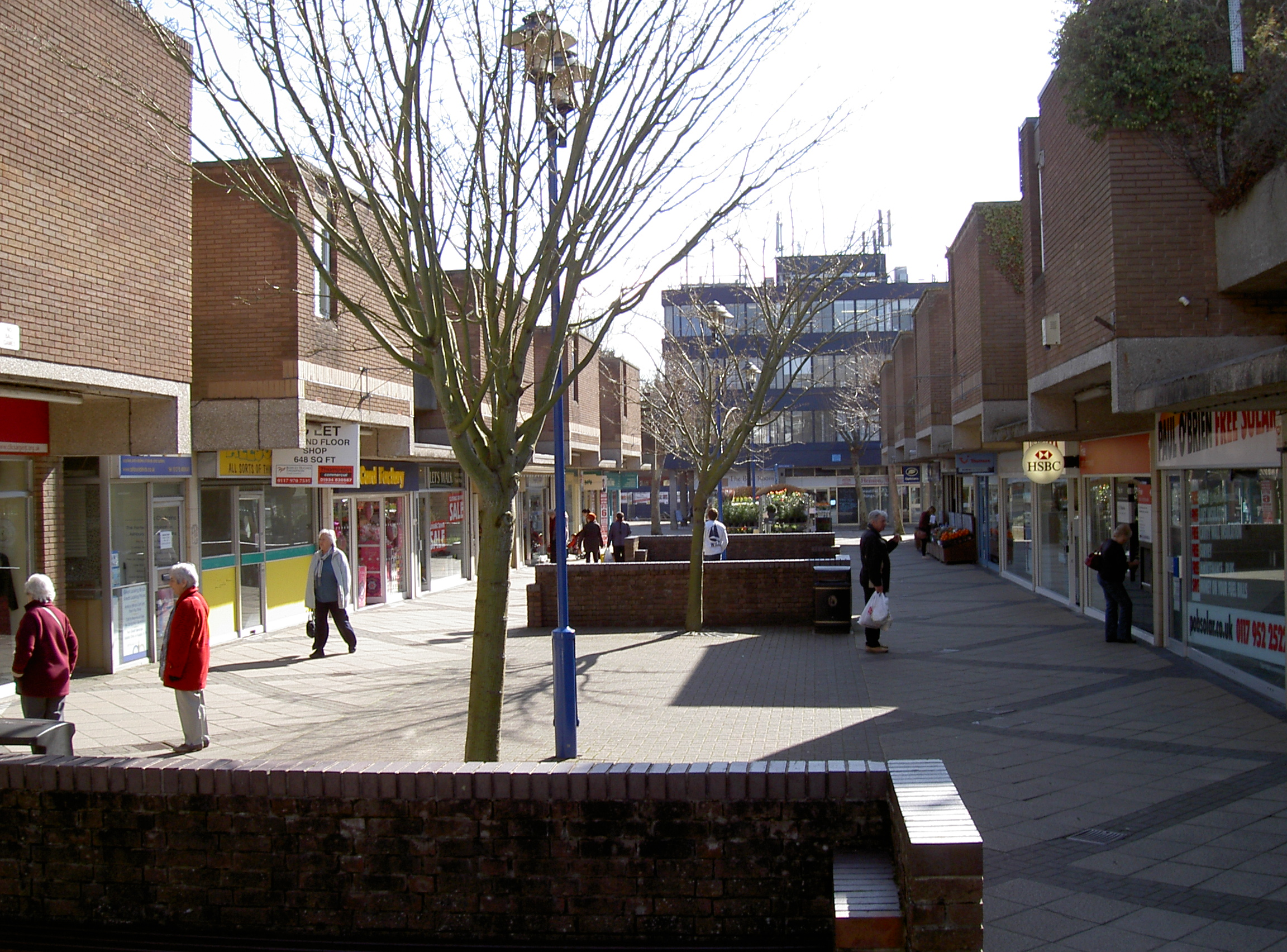
Nailsea town centre, North Somerset (1971–1976)

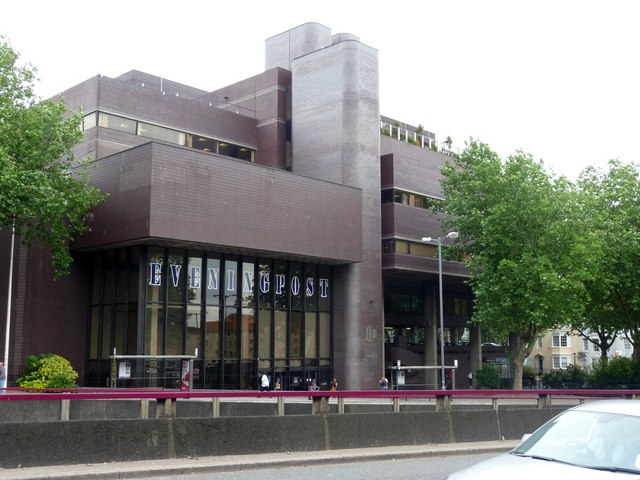
One Temple Way, Bristol (1974)

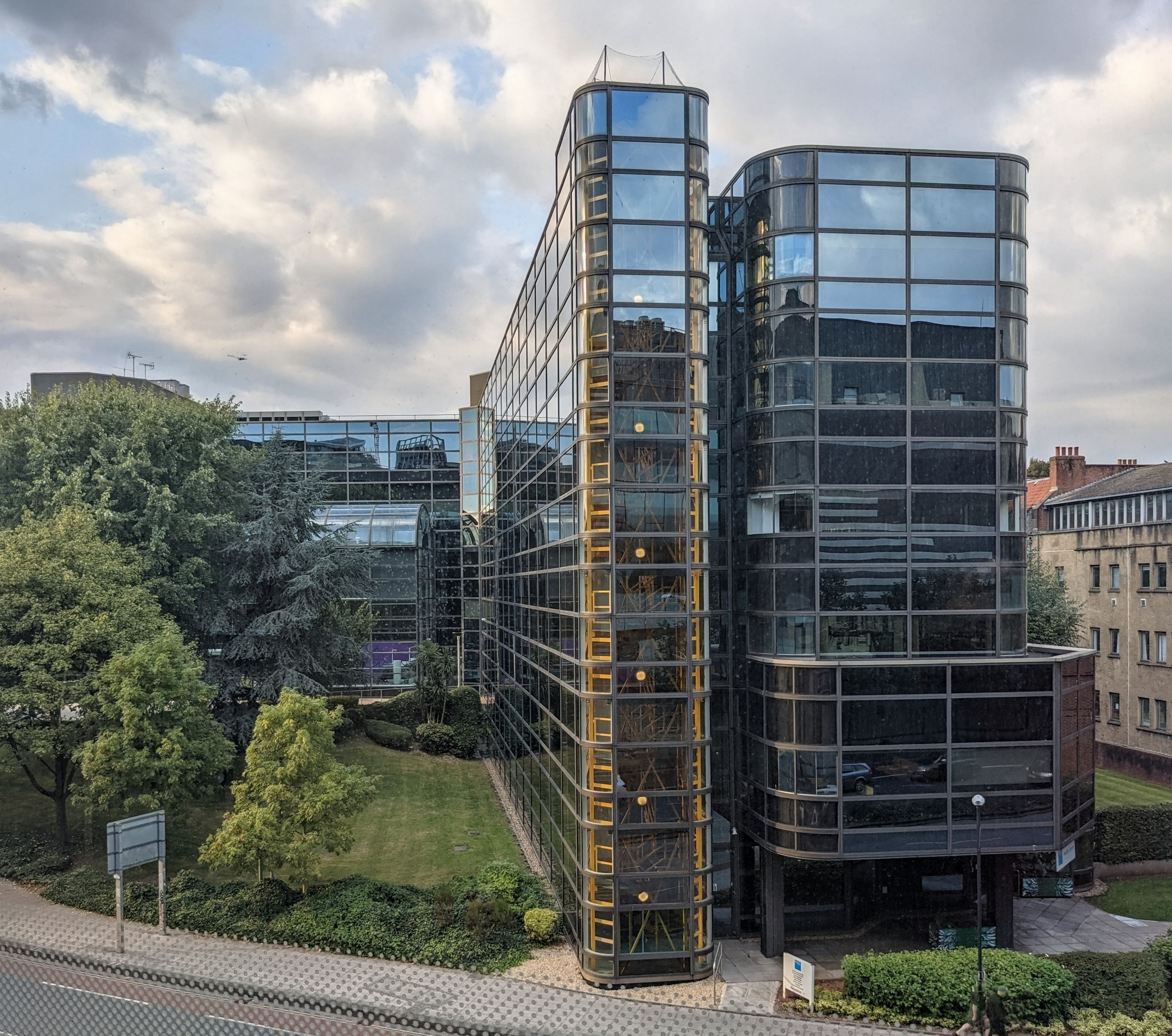
Spectrum, Bristol (1984)

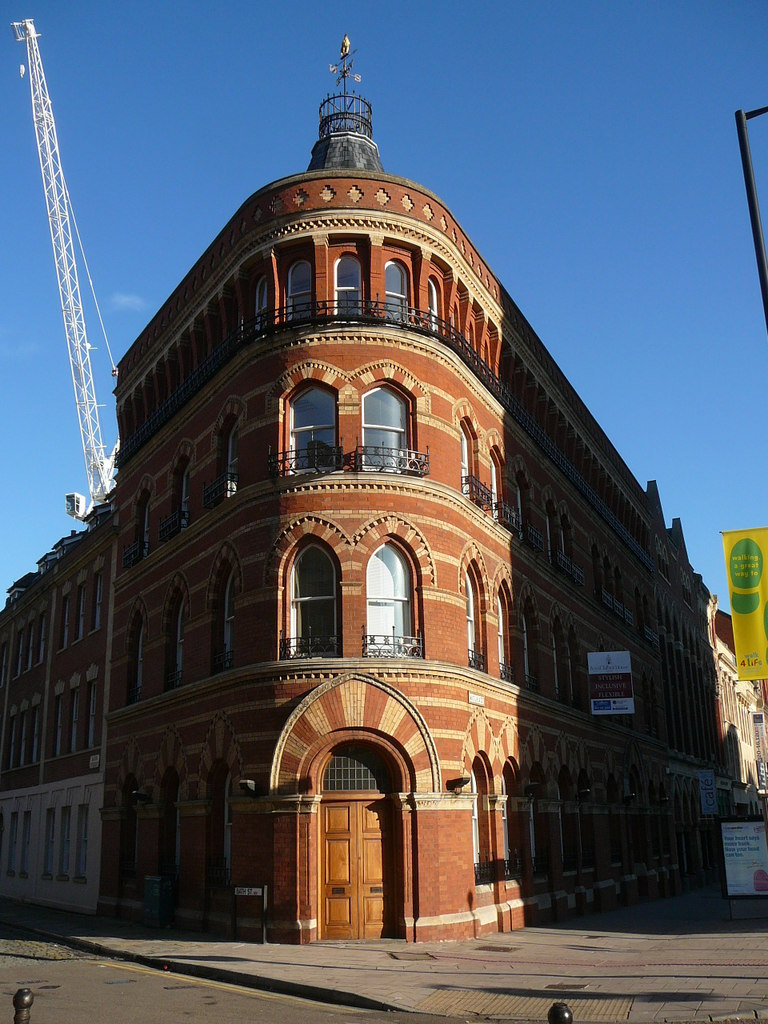
Talbot Building restoration, Bristol (1993)

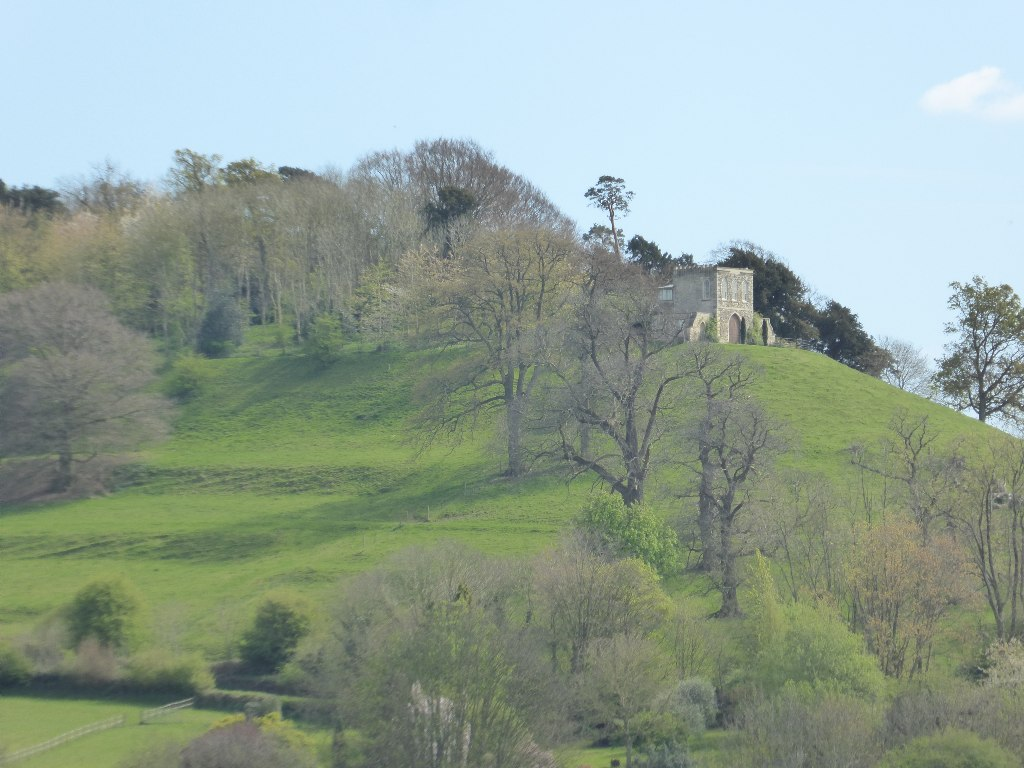
Belvedere folly restoration, Alderley, Gloucestershire (1998)

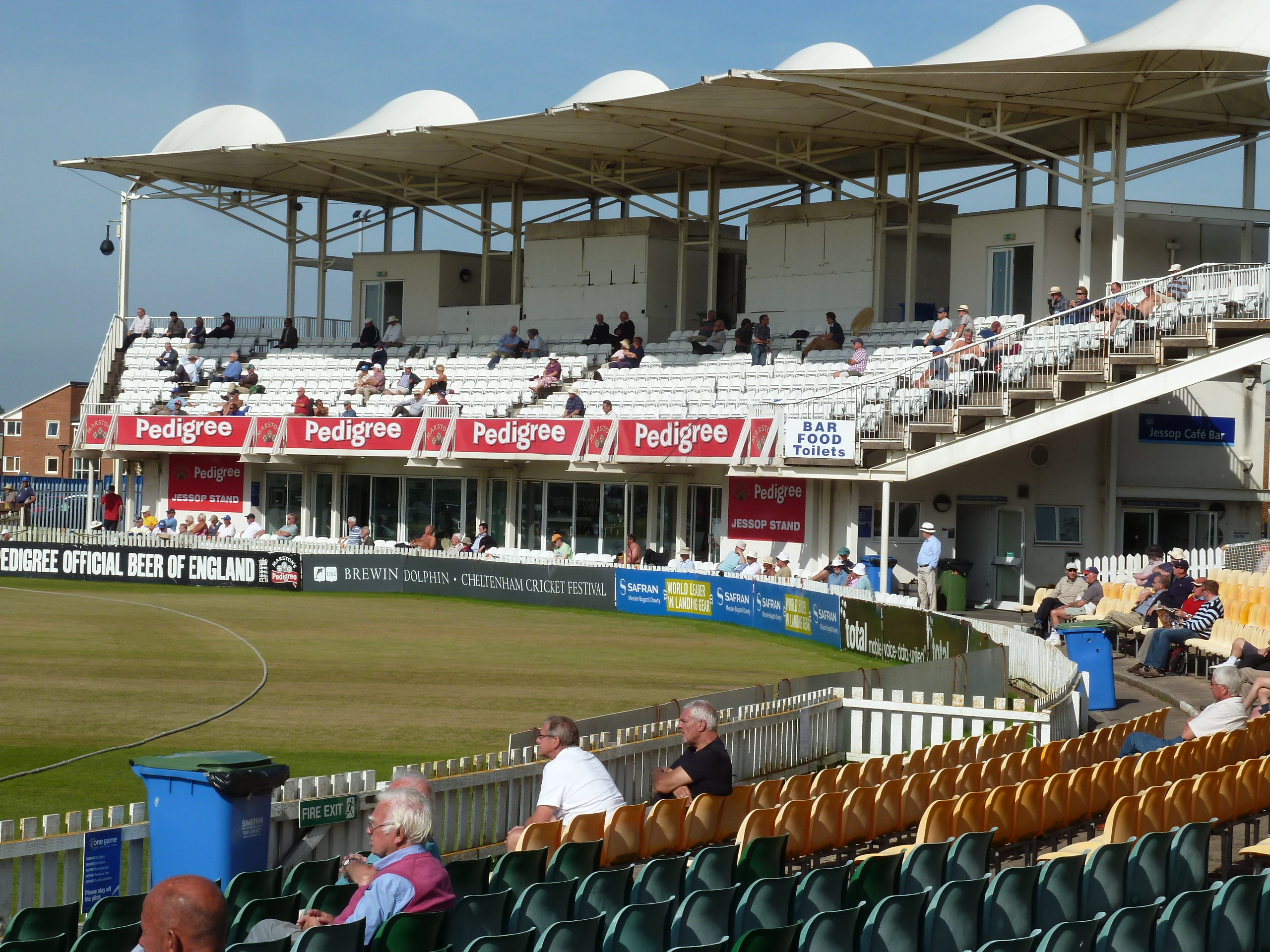
Jessop Stand, Bristol County Ground (1999)
