= Fortigent =

- Industry: financial services
- Founded: 1994; 31 years ago
- Successor: LPL Financial Holdings
- Headquarters: Rockville, Maryland
- Key people: Jamie McIntyre; Steve Lockshin

Fortigent, LLC is an American wealth management and technology services firm.

== History ==
It began in 1994 when Jamie McIntyre and Steve Lockshin collaborated to create CMS Financial Services, a wealth management, consulting and performance reporting firm based in Rockville, Maryland. CMS Financial Solutions focused on implementing absolute return and hedge fund strategies as a means of diversifying portfolios, and quickly became one of the largest independent consultants in equity risk management. Continuing with this unique approach to wealth management, performance reporting and consulting, CMS continued to grow and evolve, and by 1999 assets under management exceeded $1 billion. CMS Financial Services’ portfolio accounting and performance reporting quickly became an industry leader, and in 1995 CMS created a partnership with Arthur Andersen to provide these services to their clients nationwide.

In January 2001, CMS Financial Services was acquired by Convergent Wealth Advisors, formerly known as Lydian Trust Company (which itself was acquired by City National Bank (California) in 2007). After the acquisition in 2001, CMS Financial Services changed its name to Lydian Wealth Management in early 2003, but retained the same services and business platform, while the Fortigent platform continued to evolve and expand under Lydian Trust Company.

In 2005 Fortigent spun off from Lydian Trust Company and was formally introduced as an outsourced wealth management and technology platform for third-party advisors targeting high net worth clients.

Fortigent was bought by LPL Financial Holdings in April 2012 and moved its operations from Maryland to Charlotte, North Carolina in 2015 after a $9 Million restructuring.
