= M&G Real Estate =

Real estate investment company

- Formerly: Prudential Property Investment Managers
- Company type: Subsidiary
- Industry: Property development
- Founded: 1848; 177 years ago
- Headquarters: London, United Kingdom
- Area served: United Kingdom, Europe and Asia
- Products: Asset management and property management
- Number of employees: 200 (2023)
- Parent: M&G Investments
- Website: www.mandg.com/realestate

M&G Real Estate, formerly Prudential Property Investment Managers, is a global real estate investment manager, providing integrated services for fund management, asset management and property management. M&G Real Estate is part of M&G Investments which used to be part of Prudential until 2019. M&G Real Estate is a real estate investment manager in the United Kingdom, Europe and Asia. M&G Real Estate is headquartered in London.

M&G Real Estate began its real estate investment activities in 1848, and is today one of the largest real estate investment groups in the United Kingdom. There are over 200 employees; Alex Jeffrey was appointed chief executive in July 2012 and he was replaced by Tony Brown in 2018.

== History ==
- 1848: Prudential Mutual Assurance Investment and Loan Association established.
- 1879: Prudential moved into Holborn Bars, a purpose built office complex designed by Alfred Waterhouse, now a popular architectural landmark.

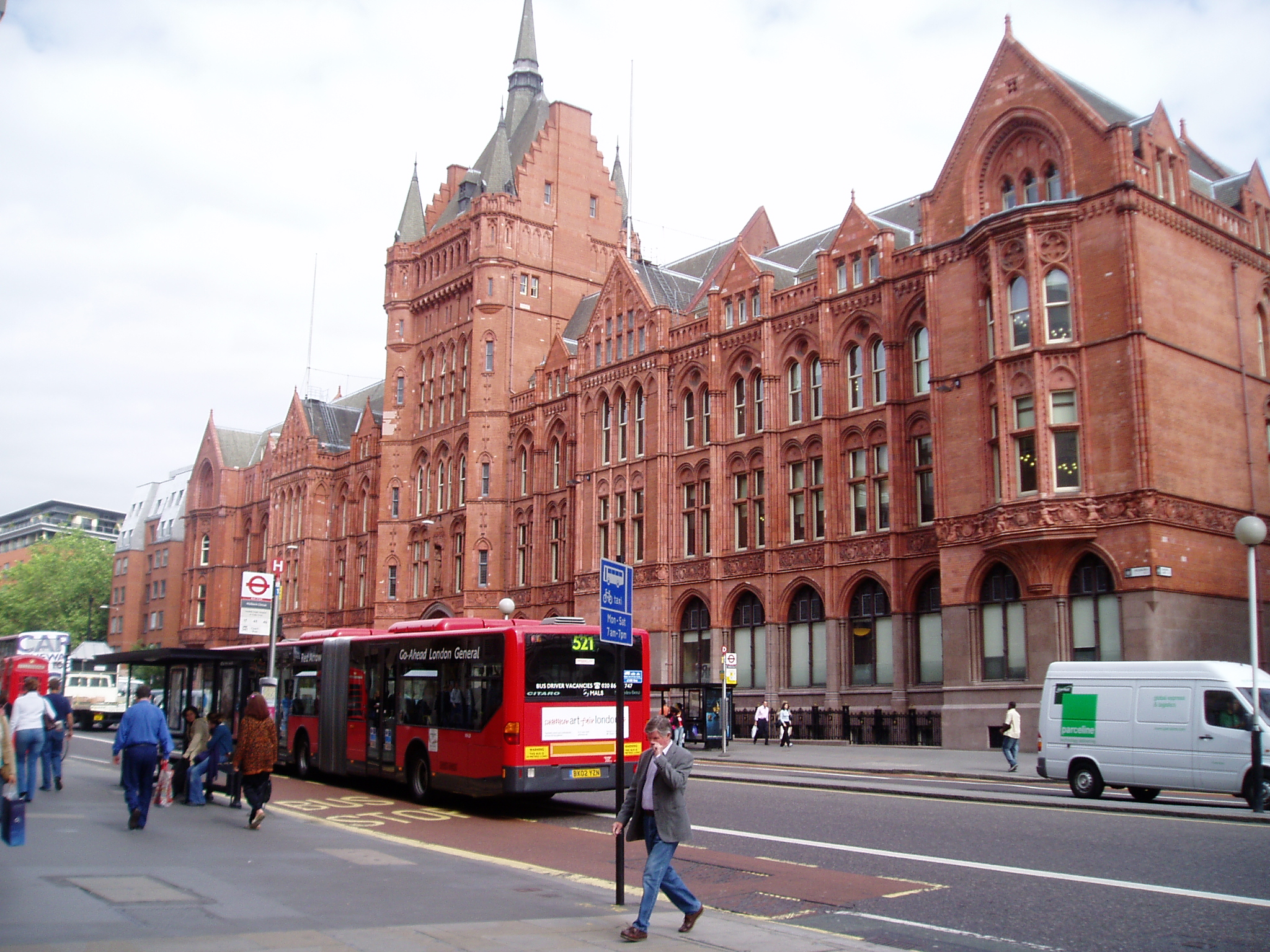
Holborn Bars

- 1920s / 1930s: Since equities collapsed in the Great Depression, many corporations diversified their holdings by investing heavily in property. During these years, Prudential made major real estate investments.
- 1982: The Prudential Estates department of Prudential Assurance Company, a forerunner of M&G Real Estate, became PPM Property
- 2001: Prudential Portfolio Managers (PPM) was integrated with Prudential's newly acquired fund management arm M&G
- 2006: Prudential Property Investment Managers was formally rebranded as PRUPIM.
- 2013: M&G Investments changes the name of PRUPIM to M&G Real Estate

== Portfolio ==
M&G Real Estate owns or co-owns properties including Manchester Arndale, Finsbury Circus, Westfield Fashion Square, Westfield Garden State Plaza, Bluewater, Cribbs Causeway and Fremlin Walk, Maidstone.

== Sustainability ==
M&G Real Estate has been active in the sustainability movement. It achieved full ISO 14001 accreditation for its entire property portfolio.
