= Richard Woolnough =

Richard Woolnough (born 1964) is a fund manager with M&G in the United Kingdom who in 2014 was the highest paid person in Prudential plc, M&G's former parent company, earning at least £15.3 million in pay and bonuses, compared to the £11.8 million earned by the chief executive Tidjane Thiam that year. Woolnough was paid £17.5 million in 2013.

Woolnough was born in Chesterfield and educated at the London School of Economics. Before starting at M&G, Woolnough worked for Lloyds Merchant Bank, the Italian insurer Assicurazioni Generali, Old Mutual and SG Warburg. Woolnough runs four funds at the investment manager M&G, which was demerged from Prudential plc in 2019.
