= QNB Bank =

American community bank based in Pennsylvania

- Type: Private company
- Industry: Financial services
- Founded: 1877; 149 years ago
- Headquarters: Quakertown, Pennsylvania, United States
- Number of locations: 14
- Key people: David W. Freeman, President/CEO
- Products: Banking services
- Number of employees: 238 (2026)
- Parent: QNB Corp.
- Website: qnbbank.com

QNB Bank, also known simply as QNB, is an independent American bank headquartered in Quakertown, Pennsylvania. It has 14 locations serving Bucks, Montgomery, and Lehigh counties in Pennsylvania. QNB Bank also has two loan production offices located in Horsham, Montgomery County, and Wyomissing, Berks County.

== History ==
QNB was founded in 1877 as The Quakertown National Bank. In 2008, the Bank converted from a National Bank to a State Bank. As the Bank no longer held a national charter, it rebranded and changed its name to QNB Bank.

Throughout the Bank's 149-year history, only seven presidents have served.

=== Presidents ===
- Dr. Joseph G. Thomas (1877–1908)
- Charles C. Haring (1909–1934)
- Hercules H. Reinhart (1934–1943)
- Dr. Calvin W. Moyer (1943–1966)
- Philip D. Miller (1966–1985)
- Thomas J. Bisko (1985–2010)
- David W. Freeman (2010–Present)

== Operations ==
QNB Bank offers full-service commercial and retail banking services. In addition, securities and advisory services are offered through LPL Financial (LPL), a registered investment advisor and broker-dealer (Member FINRA / SIPC.) Insurance products are offered through LPL or its licensed affiliates. QNB Bank and QNB Financial Services (QNBFS) are not registered as a broker-dealer or investment advisor. Registered representatives of LPL offer products and services using QNBFS, and may also be employees of QNB Bank. These products and services are being offered through LPL or its affiliates, which are separate entities from, and not affiliates of, QNB Bank or QNBFS. Securities and insurance offered through LPL or its affiliates are: Not Insured by FDIC or Any Other Government Agency, Not Bank Guaranteed, Not Bank Deposits or Obligations, and May Lose Value.
