= One Angel Court =

Highrise office building in London

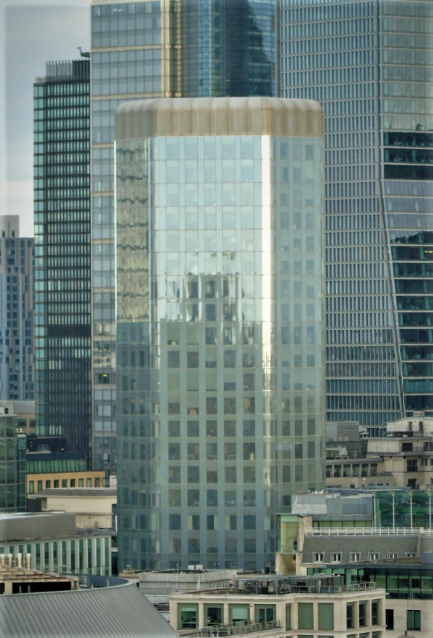
- Interactive map of the One Angel Court area

General information
- Type: Office
- Location: London, England
- Coordinates: 51.515139°N 0.087237°W
- Completed: 1979, renovated 2017

Height
- Roof: 101 m (331 ft)

Technical details
- Floor count: 27

Design and construction
- Architecture firm: Fitzroy Robinson & Partners, renovated by Fletcher Priest

One Angel Court sometimes known as just Angel Court, particularly when referring to the development as a whole, is a highrise office building in the City of London. Originally completed in 1980, it was renovated in 2017. The building stands at 101 m (331 ft).

== History ==
The development was designed by Fitzroy Robinson & Partners for the Clothworkers' Company. In 2017, the building underwent significant refurbishment under developer Stanhope with designs provided by Fletcher Priest Architects. The structure was taken from 21 to 27 storeys with the new exterior purely glass.

== Design ==
One Angel Court sits on an irregular, near-rectangular plot bounded by Throgmorton Street to the south, Copthall Avenue to the north and Angel Court to the west. The tower, just north of centre, rises in 101 m (331 ft).

== See also ==
- Stock Exchange Tower
- List of tallest buildings and structures in London
