= LPL Financial =

Independent broker-dealer in the United States

LPL Financial Holdings Inc.
- Type: Public
- Traded as: Nasdaq: LPLA; Russell 1000 Component
- Industry: Financial services
- Founded: 1989; 37 years ago
- Headquarters: San Diego, California, United States
- Key people: Rich Steinmeier, CEO; Matt Audette, President and CFO
- Revenue: ▲US$10 billion (2023)
- AUM: $1.9 Trillion
- Number of employees: 8,400 (2023)
- Subsidiaries: LPL Financial LLC; LPL Insurance Associates, Inc. Fortigent LLC; The Private Trust Company
- Website: www.lpl.com

LPL Financial Holdings Inc. (commonly referred to as LPL Financial) was founded in 1989 and has been described as the largest independent broker-dealer in the United States. As of 2026, the company had more than 32,000 financial advisors, approximately US$2.3 trillion in client assets, including US$1.4 trillion in advisory assets. LPL Financial has main offices in Boston, Fort Mill, Austin, and San Diego. The company is a member of FINRA and the SIPC.

== History ==
LPL Financial was formed in 1989 through the merger of two brokerage firms: Linsco (established as Life Insurance Securities Corp in 1968) and Private Ledger (established in 1973).

In November 2010, LPL Financial Holdings completed its initial public offering on the Nasdaq under the ticker symbol LPLA. The company’s shares were initially priced at $30 per share.

On August 15, 2017, LPL Financial Holdings Inc. signed and closed a transaction to purchase the independent broker-dealer network of National Planning Holdings, Inc. (NPH). NPH was the holding company for four independent broker-dealer firms: INVEST Financial Corporation, National Planning Corporation, Investment Centers of America, and SII Investments.

On May 2, 2018, LPL Financial agreed to a $26 million settlement arising from unregistered securities. The same year, it agreed to pay a $2.75 million fine and perform a look-back review of certain complaints primarily related to anti-money laundering (AML) reporting and customer complaint reporting. On December 3, 2018, LPL Financial Holdings Inc. reported its acquisition of AdvisoryWorld, a technology company serving the wealth management industry. Founded in 1987, the company's products include proposal generation, portfolio and investment analytics and portfolio modeling capabilities.

On June 26, 2019, LPL Financial settled with the Commonwealth of Massachusetts for $1.1 million and underwent a review of certain internal controls. The Massachusetts Securities Division (MSD) had investigated and charged LPL over compliance matters related to licensing of advisors/supervisors and late reporting. On December 26, 2019, LPL Financial paid a fine of $300,000 as part of a settlement with FINRA primarily related to its systems and procedures related to Uniform Gifts to Minors Act (UGMA) and Uniform Transfer to Minors Act (UTMA) accounts. The settlement was based on internal controls and was not related to any investor harm.

On August 18, 2020, LPL Financial Holdings Inc. reported its purchase of E.K. Riley Investments, LLC, a broker-dealer and registered investment advisor (RIA) based in Seattle. E.K. Riley served more than $2 billion of client assets and expected approximately 90% of its advisors to join LPL.

On August 20, 2020, LPL Financial Holdings Inc. reported it had completed its purchase of the San Diego–based firm Lucia Securities, a broker-dealer and Lucia Wealth Services, a registered investment advisor (RIA).

On October 27, 2020, LPL Financial Holdings Inc. announced its acquisition of Blaze Portfolio, a Chicago-based fintech firm founded in 2010. LPL stated that it would continue offering Blaze Portfolio as a stand-alone product while integrating its trading capabilities into the firm’s advisor platform. The transaction was signed and closed on October 26, 2020. LPL Financial paid approximately $12 million and agreed to a potential contingent payment of up to $5 million, subject to milestones and customary purchase price adjustments. On December 30, 2020, LPL Financial paid a fine of $6.5 million as part of a settlement with the Financial Industry Regulatory Authority (FINRA). As part of the settlement, LPL Financial consented to the findings that they had failed to supervise and failed to maintain adequate records. FINRA alleged that inadequate record keeping had exposed customers to losses through a Ponzi scheme created by one of its representatives.

In 2021, LPL Financial reported surpassing $1 trillion in brokerage and advisory assets and exceeded 20,000 financial advisors. In a 2022 article, Barron’s described LPL Financial as “the leading independent broker-dealer” in the United States.

In April 2021, LPL acquired Waddell & Reed's wealth management business.

LPL Financial joined the Fortune 500 list at number 466 in 2021 and rose to 392 in 2024. In August 2024, LPL Financial settled with the SEC for a $50 million fine for failure in electronic record keeping.

In 2024, Rich Steinmeier was named chief executive officer of LPL Financial.

In 2025, LPL Financial announced its acquisition of Commonwealth Financial Network, one of the largest independently owned wealth management firms in the United States. LPL stated that the combined organization would support more than 29,000 financial advisors.
