= Morgan McKinley =

Irish professional services recruitment firm

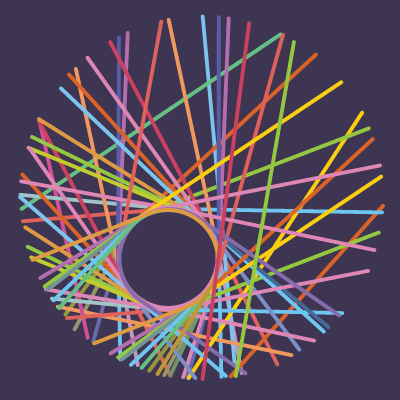
- Company type: Privately held
- Industry: Professional Services
- Founded: 1988
- Headquarters: 6 Lapp's Quay, Cork, Ireland
- Key people: Gerald Fitzgerald (CEO)
- Services: Recruitment, human resource consulting and outsourcing
- Website: morganmckinley.com

Morgan McKinley is an Irish professional services recruitment consultancy. Founded in 1988, the company has operations in the U.K, Australia, China, Hong Kong, Canada, Singapore, Ireland and Japan. It is headquartered in Cork, Ireland.

== History ==
Morgan McKinley was founded in the UK in 1988 by Pat Fitzgerald. In 2008 The Premier Group, a recruitment company founded in Ireland in 1988, acquired the business for €60 million and rebranded all of its Irish and international recruitment operations Morgan McKinley.

In 2009 Irish Taoiseach Enda Kenny opened Morgan McKinley’s Shanghai office.

In 2021, Morgan McKinley acquired Cork-based outsourcing firm, Abtra.

== Publications ==
The company publishes the London Employment Monitor which is used as an indicator of the jobs market in the City of London. The company also publishes the Irish Employment Monitor which tracks employment trends in the Republic of Ireland.
