= M&G =

British fund management company

M&G plc

- Headquarters building, London
- Formerly: M&G Prudential Limited (2018–2019); M&G Prudential plc (July–September 2019)
- Type: Public
- Traded as: LSE: MNG; FTSE 100 component
- ISIN: GB00BKFB1C65
- Industry: Financial services
- Founded: 1931; 95 years ago (demerged 2019)
- Headquarters: London, England, UK
- Key people: Edward Braham (chair); Andrea Rossi (CEO)
- Brands: M&G Investments; M&G Real Estate
- Revenue: ▲£4,425 million (2025)
- Operating income: ▲£1,310 million (2025)
- Net income: ▲£314 million (2025)
- AUM: ▲£375.9 billion (2025)
- Number of employees: 8,282 (2025)
- Website: group.mandg.com

M&G plc is a global investment manager headquartered in the City of London. Since its de-merger from Prudential plc, it has been listed on the London Stock Exchange and is a constituent of the FTSE 100 Index.

== History ==
=== Pre-2000 ===
Municipal & General Securities Company Limited launched the First British Fixed Trust in 1931. It held the shares of 24 companies in a fixed portfolio that was not changed for the fixed lifespan of 20 years. The trust was relaunched as the M&G General Trust and later renamed as the Blue Chip Fund.

M&G Investments introduced its savings or "thrift" plans in 1954.

In March 1999 M&G Investments, which by then was the UK's largest unit trust group, was acquired by Prudential plc.

=== 2000–2020 ===
In May 2016, it announced it was to launch a direct online investment service for retail investors to invest directly in its range of funds.

In July 2016, M&G Investments suspended redemptions on its £4.4 billion Property Portfolio fund following heavy withdrawals after the referendum on the UK's exit from the European Union.

In August 2017, Prudential plc (the parent company of M&G Investments) announced it would merge M&G Investments with its Prudential UK and Europe businesses to form a new division. The division would be called M&GPrudential, which the firm described as a savings and investments business. In August 2019, it announced that it would de-merge the investment business as "M&G plc". The de-merger was completed in October 2019.

In December 2019, M&G was forced to gate a £2.5 billion property fund after liquidity was challenged. The company said it was due to Brexit and Election uncertainty.

=== 2020–2021 ===
In 2020, it announced its intention to acquire Ascentric, a digital wealth management platform, from its competitor Royal London. In August 2021, M&G acquired Sandringham Financial Partners. Sandringham will be part of M&G Wealth. The acquisition will bring more than £2.5 billion of assets under advice to M&G plc.

== Current operations ==
The company operates two fully owned subsidiaries: M&G Real Estate, providing global real estate investment services, and Infracapital, a specialised infrastructure investment firm.

== Sponsorship ==
M&G was the official sponsor of the RHS Chelsea Flower Show until 2022.

== Notable current and former employees ==
The group chief executive John Foley joined former M&G parent Prudential in 2000 as deputy group treasurer, subsequently leading the combination of M&G Investments with Prudential’s UK insurance business. In 2015, Foley became chief executive. In 2017, he executed the merger of the company with M&G Investments and Prudential UK, and managed the enlarged M&G through the demerger from Prudential plc in 2019, after the decision was made to shift the focus on Asia and Africa. In April 2022, M&G announced Foley's retirement after 22 years to leave once his successor has been found.

In September 2022, the company announced the appointment Andrea Rossi as its new CEO, starting on 10 October on a salary of £875,000 and a bonus package. Upon appointment, Rossi said that he would not pursue a break-up of the business.

- Ian Fairbairn – rower; Summer Olympics (1924)
- Anne Richards – CEO of Fidelity International (2017–present)
- Richard Woolnough – fund manager at M&G Investments; highest paid fund manager in 2014
