= Jackson National Life =

American financial services company

Jackson National Life Insurance Company
- Trade name: Jackson
- Type: Public
- Traded as: Nasdaq: JXN; S&P 600 component
- Industry: Financial services
- Genre: Financial
- Founded: 1961
- Founder: A.J (Tony) Pasant
- Headquarters: Lansing, Michigan, U.S.
- Number of locations: Lansing, Michigan; East Lansing, Michigan; Nashville, Tennessee; Chicago, Illinois; Purchase, New York
- Area served: Nationwide
- Key people: Laura Prieskorn; CEO
- Products: Retirement; Annuity
- Services: Annuities
- Total assets: US$ 297.6 billion (2020)
- Number of employees: 4,800 (2015)
- Subsidiaries: Jackson National Life Insurance Company of New York; Jackson National Asset Management, LLC; Jackson National Life Distributors LLC; Brooke Life Insurance; PPM America, Inc.; Curian Capital, LLC; Life of Georgia; Securities of Denver Insurance; PGDS (US One); Jackson Charitable Foundation Inc.
- Website: jackson.com

Jackson National Life Insurance Company (often referred to as simply Jackson) is an American company that provides annuities for retail investors and fixed income products for institutional investors. Jackson subsidiaries and affiliates provide specialized asset management and retail brokerage services. Prior to being spun off in 2021, Jackson was a subsidiary of the British insurer, Prudential plc, which acquired the company for $608 million in 1986. The company is unrelated to the American insurance conglomerate, Prudential Financial.

Founded in 1961, Jackson is headquartered in Alaiedon Township, Michigan, near Lansing.

== History ==
Jackson was named after Andrew Jackson, the seventh President of the United States. Jackson was founded in 1961 in Jackson, Michigan, and moved to its headquarters in Lansing, Michigan in 1976. In the early years, the company focused on offering term insurance to individuals as an alternative to whole life products. Jackson was an early adopter of the independent distribution model, eliminating its captive agency sales force in 1970 to sell products through independent agents. By 1984, Jackson had grown to $1 billion in assets. The company's growth attracted the attention of Prudential plc, which acquired Jackson in 1986.

In 1995, the company launched its first variable annuity and began selling guaranteed investment contracts and funding agreements through its Institutional Products Department. In 1996, Jackson introduced its first fixed index annuity (FIA).

In March 2003, Jackson entered the registered investment adviser channel with the launch of Curian Capital LLC. Jackson's acquisitions of Life Insurance Company of Georgia in 2005 and SRLC America Holding Corp. (SRLC) in 2012 each added 1.5 million in-force life insurance and annuity policies to Jackson's books.

Prudential announced on 28 January 2021 its intention to demerge Jackson, resulting in two separately listed companies. Prudential shareholders as of 2 September 2021, were entitled to receive one share of Jackson’s Class A common stock for every 40 Prudential ordinary shares held on that date. Since the spinoff the Jackson shares trade on the New York Stock Exchange under the ticker “JXN”.
