= Prudential plc =

British multinational life insurance and financial services company

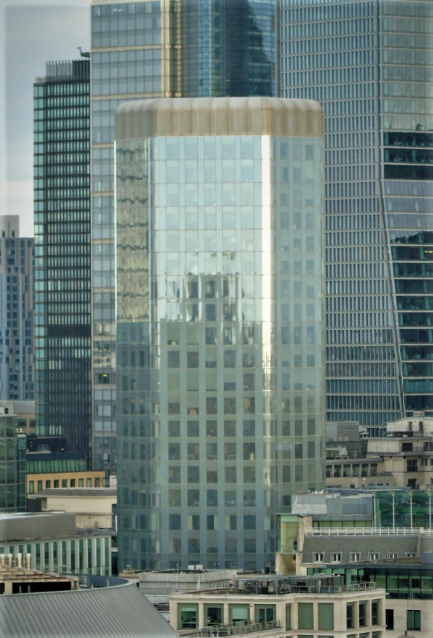
- Headquarters at One Angel Court, London
- Formerly: Prudential Corporation Public Limited Company (1978–1999)
- Type: Public
- Traded as: LSE: PRU; NYSE: PUK; SEHK: 2378; FTSE 100 Component
- Industry: Insurance; Asset management
- Founded: 1848; 178 years ago, in London
- Headquarters: London, England, UK; Hong Kong
- Area served: Worldwide
- Key people: Sir Douglas Flint; (chair); Anil Wadhwani; (CEO)
- Services: Insurance; General insurance; Health insurance; Vehicle insurance; Travel insurance; Home insurance; Life insurance; Mortgage loans; Investment management; Asset management; Mutual funds
- Revenue: ▲$11.080 billion (2025)
- Operating income: ▲$4.941 billion (2025)
- Net income: ▲$4.119 billion (2025)
- Total assets: ▲$212.195 billion (2025)
- Total equity: ▲$21.360 billion (2025)
- Number of employees: 22,308 (2013)
- Subsidiaries: Eastspring Investments; ICICI Prudential Life Insurance; ICICI Prudential Mutual Fund
- Website: prudentialplc.com

Prudential plc is a British multinational insurance and asset management company headquartered in London and Hong Kong. It was founded in London in May 1848 to provide loans to professional and working people.

Prudential has dual primary listings on the London Stock Exchange and Hong Kong Stock Exchange, and is a constituent of the FTSE 100 Index. It also has secondary listings on the New York Stock Exchange and Singapore Exchange.

== History ==
=== Early history ===
The company was founded in Hatton Garden in London in May 1848 as The Prudential, Investment, Loan, and Assurance Association and in September 1848 changed its name to The Prudential Mutual Assurance, Investment, and Loan Association, to provide loans to professional and working people. In 1854, the company began selling the relatively new concept of Industrial Branch insurance policies to the working class population for premiums as low as one penny a week through agents acting as door to door salesmen. The army of premium collection agents was for many years identified with the Prudential as the "Man from the Pru". The company moved to its long-time home at Holborn Bars in 1879 and converted to a limited company in 1881. The building was designed by Alfred Waterhouse, and is built of terracotta manufactured by Gibbs and Canning of Tamworth (c.1878): two of the same driving forces behind the Natural History Museum in London.

=== 20th century ===
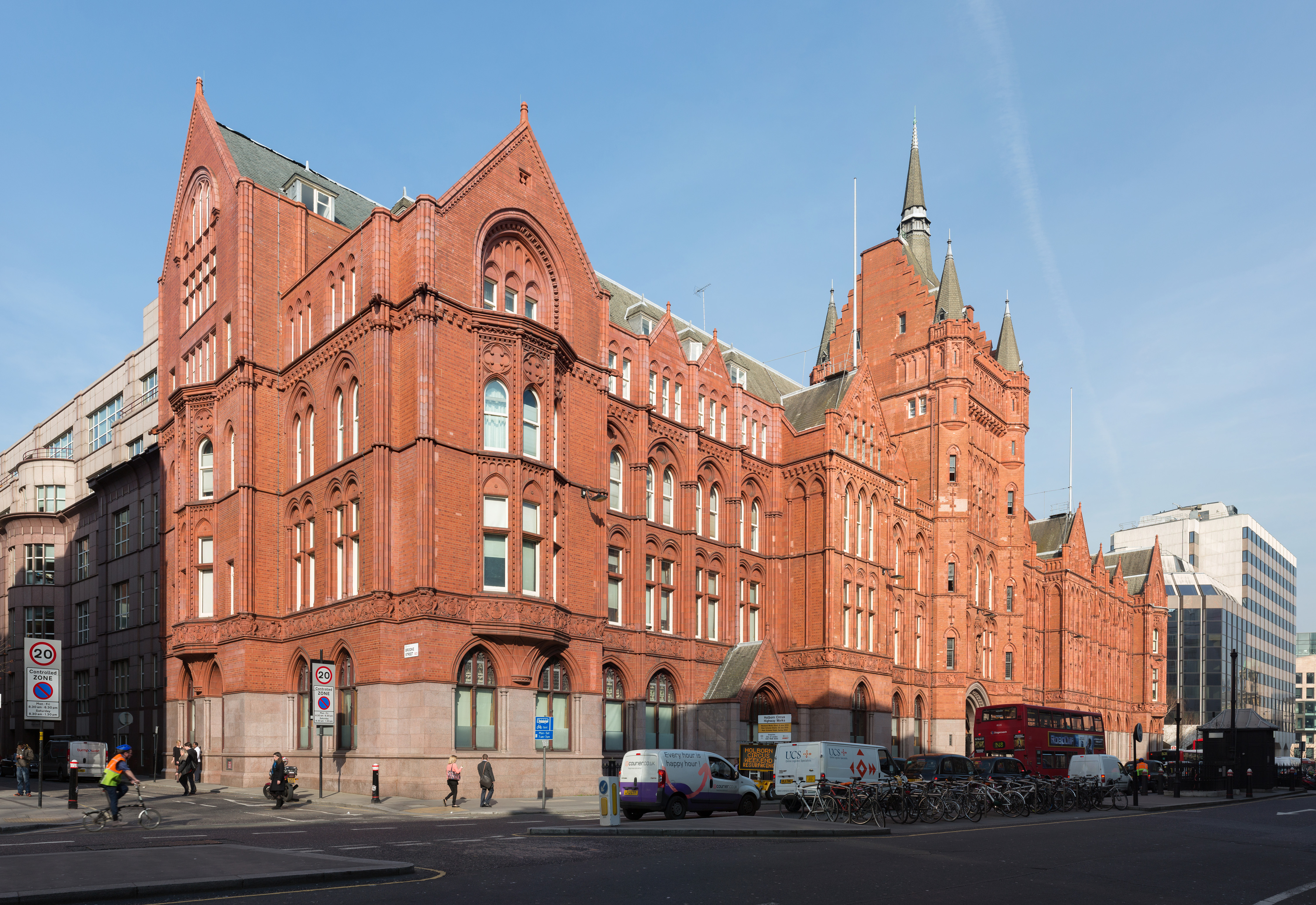
Holborn Bars—Traditional home of Prudential

The company was first listed on the London Stock Exchange in 1924.

In the mid-1980s, financial deregulation allowed financial institutions to own estate agencies, and Prudential decided to follow early market entrants such as Provident Financial Group plc (Whitegates) and Lloyds Bank (Black Horse Agencies), in summer 1985 by purchasing a long-established and successful Huntingdon-based firm of estate agents, Ekins, Dilley and Handley, for £12 million. This was originally intended as an experiment allowing the company a new route to market for mortgage-linked endowment policies; however after many other financial institutions followed suit, Prudential rapidly started to embark on an acquisition trail which would quickly see it become market leader in terms of number of offices. Acquisitions included Chestertons Residential and Earl & Lawrence in August 1986, Edward Bailey & Son in January 1987, The Channel Island Estate Agency Property Shop in February 1987, and Rogers & Clark in May 1987. This was however done at great cost. Although a typical cost of establishing a new estate agency branch was around £75,000–£100,000, Prudential paid a total of £125 million for 337 of its branches: an average cost per branch of £371,000.

In 1986, Prudential acquired the American insurer Jackson National Life. In the same year, amongst many other acquisitions, Prudential Property Services acquired the fifty-two strong chain of Reeds Rains for £24 million.

The collapse of the housing market in the south of England in 1989 brought about a slump in income at Prudential Property Services, which during the first half of 1990 lost £23 million. Prudential had been closing branches, with 100 closing between December 1988 and May 1990. After these losses were announced, another 175 branches closed in July 1990. In May 1991 Prudential sold the remainder of the chain for a total of £13.5 million, representing a 90% loss on the cost of acquisition. Some branches were purchased by their original owners for fractions of the price they had received from the Prudential just a few years earlier. For example, the Prudential Property Services office in Hanwell was originally an independent agency, purchased by Prudential for £200,000: it was subsequently sold off to Rolfe East Estate Agents for £1. The western division of Prudential Property Services was sold to Scottish Widows to join their Connells Estate Agents chain. The northern division was sold in a £3.4 million management buyout reverting to the name, Reeds Rains, the south east division was sold to become Arun Estates, and Chestertons and another region were sold to the Woolwich Property Services.

In 1997, Prudential acquired Scottish Amicable, a business founded in 1826 in Glasgow as the West of Scotland Life Insurance Company, for £1.75 bn.

In 1998, Prudential set up Egg, an internet bank in the UK. The subsidiary reached 550,000 customers within nine months, but had difficulty achieving profitability. In June 2000, an initial public offering of 21% was made to allow for further growth of the internet business, but in February 2006 Prudential decided to repurchase the 21% share of Egg. Egg was subsequently sold to Citibank in January 2007. In 1999, M&G, a UK fund management company, was acquired. In June 2000, the company was first listed on the New York Stock Exchange to help focus on the US market.

=== 21st century ===
In February 2002, Churchill bought Prudential's general insurance business.

In October 2004, Prudential launched a new subsidiary, PruHealth, a joint venture with Discovery Holdings of South Africa selling private medical insurance to the UK market. In April 2008, Prudential outsourced its back office functions to Capita: about 3,000 jobs were transferred (1,000 in Stirling, 750 in Reading and 1,250 in Mumbai). This significant outsourcing deal, worth an estimated £722m over a 15-year contract, built on Prudential's existing relationship with Capita, who took over its Belfast operation in 2006 along with about 450 employees in a smaller operational restructure.

On 1 March 2010, Prudential announced that it was in "advanced talks" to purchase the pan-Asian life insurance company of AIG, American International Assurance (AIA) for approximately £23 billion. The deal later collapsed, and AIA ended up raising money in an IPO.

In December 2013, Prudential announced the purchase of Ghana's Express Life Company. Express Life was subsequently rebranded as Prudential Ghana. In April 2014, Prudential launched two corporate responsibility initiatives to support education in Ghana: the Prudential Scholarship Programme for more than 500 senior high school students, in partnership with the NGO Plan Ghana; and a scheme to support actuarial science graduates. In September 2014, Prudential purchased Kenyan life insurer Shield Assurance and rebranded it as Prudential Kenya, further expanding the company's presence in Africa. Prudential has since entered six other African countries – Uganda in 2015, Zambia in 2016, Nigeria in 2017, Cameroon, Côte d'Ivoire and Togo in 2019.

On 10 March 2015, it was announced that the CEO, Tidjane Thiam, would leave Prudential to become the next CEO of Credit Suisse. On 1 May 2015, it was announced that Mike Wells, head of the company's US business, would succeed Tidjane Thiam as CEO, on a pay package worth up to £7.5 million.

In August 2017, it was announced that Prudential was to combine its asset manager, M&G, and Prudential UK & Europe to form M&GPrudential.

In November 2017, Prudential announced the change in the name of its joint venture with Chinese investment company CITIC to "CITIC Prudential Life Insurance Company Limited".

In March 2018, Prudential announced that it would demerge M&GPrudential from the Group; the demerger was completed on 21 October 2019.

In 2021, the company demerged its US business Jackson National Life leaving it focused solely on African and Asian markets.

As of March 2022, 60 percent of Prudential's head office staff were based in Hong Kong, and fewer than 200 employees were in London.

In January 2026, the company announced that Douglas Flint will become the company's new board chair from 28 May, assuming the role from Shriti Vadera, Baroness Vadera. Flint will join the board as a non-executive director from March 2026.

== Operations ==
The company has two business units:

- Prudential Corporation Asia: based in Hong Kong, the business is the largest UK life assurer in Asia. It has had a presence in the continent since 1923 when an overseas agency for life assurance was created in India. Although this was subsequently nationalised, Prudential relaunched in India in 2000 as ICICI Prudential, a 26% joint venture with ICICI Bank. As CITIC Prudential Life, a 50–50 joint venture, they were the first UK company to re-establish a life business in mainland China in 2000. There are also businesses in Cambodia, mainland China, Hong Kong, India, Indonesia, Laos, Malaysia, Myanmar, the Philippines, Singapore, Taiwan, Thailand and Vietnam. Prudential's Asian asset management business, Eastspring Investments, has total funds under management of US$247.8 billion.
- Since 2014 Prudential has been building a multi-product, multi-distribution business in Africa, with operations now in eight countries across the continent, including Nigeria, Ghana, Togo, Cameroon and over one million customers. Nairobi has been the regional office for Prudential's Africa business since 2021.

== Prudential RideLondon ==
Prudential were the inaugural sponsor of RideLondon, an annual two-day cycling festival, held for the first time in 2013. The 2017 Prudential RideLondon-Surrey 100 set a new fundraising record for the event, with £12.75 million raised for charity, bringing the total raised by the event to more than £53 million in its first five years.

The event was developed by the Mayor of London and his agencies and is organised by the London & Surrey Cycling Partnership. The main events are a 100-mile professional road race through Surrey and London, and an amateur race along the same route. Participants in the amateur race typically raise money for good causes. The 20,709 finishers in the 2014 event raised more than £10 million for charity. Prudential ended its title sponsorship of RideLondon in 2020.

== Senior management ==
Key individuals are:

Chair of the Board of Directors	Shriti Vadera
Chief Executive Officer	Anil Wadhwani
Chief Financial Officer	Ben Bulmer
Group Chief Risk and Compliance Officer	Avnish Kalra

== See also ==
- Invest Financial Corporation
- Prudential Staff Union
- Richard Woolnough
