= Allen Kendrick =

American missionary and minister (1811–1859)

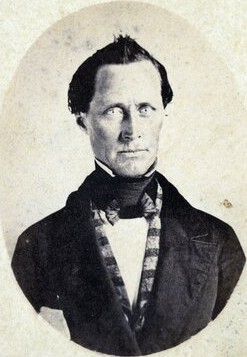
- Kendrick around 1856
- Born: 3 March 1811; Lauderdale County, Alabama, U.S.
- Died: 1 December 1859 (aged 48); Hamburg, Tennessee, U.S.
- Burial place: Oak Hill Christian Church Cemetery, Kendrick, Alcorn, Mississippi, U.S.
- Education: Franklin College
- Spouse: Nancy Ann Rose (m. 1845; died 1898)
- Children: Mansel Kendrick; Allen Rose Kendrick; Carroll Kendrick, Pauline Kendrick
- Parents: Jesse Kendrick (father); Mary Parker (mother)
- Relatives: Carroll Kendrick, John Parker, Daniel Parker, Parker Family

Ecclesiastical career
- Religion: Christianity (Churches of Christ)
- Writings: Millennial Harbinger (contributor); Gospel Advocate (contributor); Christian Journal (publisher); Ecclesiastic Reformer (publisher)

Allen Kendrick (March 3, 1811 – December 1, 1859) was a clergy member within the Restoration Movement, a Christian movement that began in the early 19th century, led by Barton W. Stone and Alexander Campbell. Kendrick was a land speculator and businessman as well as a minister, writer, and publisher in the Christian Church (Disciples of Christ).

== Early life and education ==
Allen Kendrick was born on March 3, 1811, in Lauderdale County, Alabama, and was the brother of fellow Christian Church minister, writer, editor, and publisher Carroll Kendrick. His parents were Jesse Kendrick and Mary Jane Parker Kendrick. His parents were divorced in Tippah County, Mississippi in 1841. His father Jesse Kendrick moved to Miller County, Missouri. His grandfather was John Parker, who was killed in the Fort Parker massacre. His son was politician Carroll Kendrick.

Kendrick grew up on Cypress Creek, and was a boyhood friend of Tolbert Fanning. The Christian movement came to the Shoals area under the influence of the Lynn and Chisholm family who had brought the concept of New Testament Christianity to the area from their Kentucky home around the time of Kendrick's birth. In the fall of 1826, both Allen and Tolbert were converted to Christ under the preaching of B.F. Hall and James E. Matthews. It was not long before both were preaching in the area.

He left home when he was sixteen years old over a disagreement with his father for joining the Christian Church. He would later move to Kentucky and increase his relationship with the movement initiated by Barton W. Stone. Kendrick was educated at Franklin College. The churches that he pastored included the First Christian Church at Philadelphia, Pennsylvania in 1839, the Central Christian Church at Lexington, Kentucky, and the Christian Church at Louisville, Kentucky in the 1840s. He was also an evangelist preaching throughout Tennessee, Kentucky, and Mississippi.

He was married to Nancy Hughes Rose near Louisville, Kentucky, on June 17, 1845. His wife's family were early settlers of Louisville. They had four children: three sons and one daughter. They were: Mansel Kendrick, born March 12, 1846; Allen Rose Kendrick, born July 27, 1849; Carroll Kendrick, named for his uncle, born May 24, 1852; and Pauline, born April 9, 1854. Mansel and Allen Kendrick became ministers in the Christian Church. The Kendrick family was highly esteemed and influential in the Christian church movement. They influenced and baptized thousands of people.

== Writing, publishing, and land speculation in North Mississippi ==
Kendrick wrote sermons, poetry, and reports for Christian periodicals, including the Millennial Harbinger, the Gospel Advocate. With his brother, Carroll Kendrick, he published at least two Christian Church periodicals, the Christian Journal (1845–1846) and the Ecclesiastic Reformer. He corresponded with leaders in the Christian Church movement such as Alexander Campbell and Barton W. Stone.

Kendrick was one of the largest land speculators in northern Mississippi after the 1832 Chickasaw land cession. He began buying land in 1838, and his last purchase was recorded in September, 1855. He owned over 5,000 acres. He earned an annualized profit of 20 percent from buying and selling land during a period of 17 years. In a 1849 letter he stated that he had property valued at around $69,000 (about $2,865,731 in today's dollars). The community of Kendrick on the northeastern Mississippi and Tennessee border in Alcorn County, Mississippi is named after him.

== Later life and death ==
Allen and Nancy Kendrick lived many years in the area they settled on the northeastern Mississippi and Tennessee border. They founded the Oak Hill Christian Church in Kendrick, Mississippi on the state line. Allen preached there and is buried in the Oak Hill Christian Church Cemetery. Allen Kendrick died at the age of 48 on December 1, 1859, at Hamburg, Tennessee. Nancy survived her husband nearly forty years, and died October 3, 1898. She was buried by the side of her husband.
