= Carroll Kendrick (minister) =

American missionary and minister (1815–1891)

- Kendrick around 1870
- Born: 29 December 1815; Maury County, Tennessee, U.S.
- Died: 2 October 1891 (aged 75); Downey, Los Angeles, California, U.S.
- Burial place: Evergreen Cemetery, Los Angeles, California, U.S.
- Education: Bacon College (M.D.) (now Transylvania University), Franklin College (Hon. M.A.)
- Spouse: Mary Wade Forbes (m. 1840; died 1884)
- Children: 9
- Parents: Jesse Kendrick (father); Mary Parker (mother)
- Relatives: Allen Kendrick, Carroll Kendrick, John Parker, Daniel Parker, Parker Family

Ecclesiastical career
- Religion: Christianity (Churches of Christ)
- Writings: Millennial Harbinger (contributor); Gospel Advocate (contributor); Ecclesiastic Reformer (editor); Christian Philanthropist (editor); Christian Journal (editor); Live Religious Issues of the Day: Rules and Principles for Bible Study (1890); Rules for Bible Study (1946)

Carroll Kendrick (December 29, 1815 – October 2, 1891) was a clergy member within the Restoration Movement, a Christian movement that began in the early 19th century, led by Barton W. Stone and Alexander Campbell. Kendrick was a physician as well as a minister, editor, and publisher in the Christian Church (Disciples of Christ).

== Early life and education ==
Carroll Kendrick was born on December 29, 1815, in Maury County, Tennessee. He lived in Alabama, Kentucky, and Texas before moving to California. His brother was fellow Christian Church minister Allen Kendrick. His parents were Jesse Kendrick and Mary Jane Parker Kendrick. His parents were divorced in Tippah County, Mississippi in 1841. His father Jesse Kendrick moved to Miller County, Missouri. His mother was a sister of Daniel Parker, noted predestinarian Baptist minister. His grandfather was John Parker, who was killed in the Fort Parker massacre. His nephew and namesake was politician Carroll Kendrick. Kendrick married Mary Wade Forbes near Stanford, Kentucky, on October 15, 1840. They had nine children. Kendrick was educated at Bacon College (now Transylvania University), Harrodsburg, Kentucky, and received an honorary M.A. from Franklin College.

He moved to Texas in 1851 as a missionary and supported his family by farming, practicing medicine, and preaching. Kendrick was a prominent revivalist and was largely responsible for beginning the practice of holding camp meetings for Christian churches in Texas; he conducted meetings through East Texas and on the Western frontier. He lived at Palestine, Salado, Bryan, and Bastrop. He moved to Oakland, California in 1874, before moving to Southern California in 1879.

== Writing, publishing, and editing ==
Kendrick wrote for many Christian periodicals, including the Millennial Harbinger, the Gospel Advocate, the Ecclesiastic Reformer, and the Christian Philanthropist. With his brother, Allen Kendrick, he was founding publisher and editor of the Christian Journal (1845-1846) the Ecclesiastic Reformer in Kentucky before he moved to Texas. He became the first Christian Church publisher of a religious periodical in Texas in 1855 when he published the Christian Philanthropist, which merged with the Tennessee Gospel Advocate in September 1856. The Philanthropist was reissued for several months beginning in August 1866 but was again merged with the Advocate, and Kendrick conducted the Texas department. He wrote a volume called Live Religious Issues of the Day: Rules and Principles for Bible Study (1890). Part of this work was reprinted as Rules for Bible Study in 1946.

== Death ==
Carroll Kendrick died at the age of 75 on October 2, 1891 at Downey City, California. He was buried near central Los Angeles, California in Evergreen Cemetery.
