= Richardson Affair =

The phrase, the Richardson Affair, has been used to refer to at least two separate incidents in political and military history:

- Richardson Affair in Japanese history - The Namamugi Incident (生麦事件 Namamugi-jiken?) (also known sometimes as the Kanagawa Incident, and as the Richardson Affair) was a samurai assault on British people in Japan on September 14, 1862.
- Richardson Affair in US history - The Richardson Affair in US history involved the efforts in the late 1890s by Representative James D. Richardson (1843-1914) to privately copyright a series of published Presidential proclamations.
