= Elkhart High School (Texas) =

Location
- 9002 S State Hwy 19; Elkhart, Anderson County, Texas 75839-9701; United States; 31.6557°N 95.5821°W

Information
- School type: Public, high school
- Locale: Rural: Distant
- School district: Elkhart ISD
- Superintendent: Kyle Johnson
- NCES School ID: 481839001732
- Principal: Brandi McEnturff
- Faculty: 33.71 (on an FTE basis)
- Grades: 9–12
- Enrollment: 309 (2023–24)
- Student to teacher ratio: 9.17
- Colors: Red and royal blue
- Athletics conference: UIL Class 3A
- Mascot: Elks
- Website: Elkhart High School

Elkhart High School is a public high school located in Elkhart, Texas. It is part of the Elkhart Independent School District located in southeastern Anderson County and classified as a 3A school by the UIL. During 2023-2024, Elkhart High School had an enrollment of 309 students and a student to teacher ratio of 9.17. The school received an A from the Texas Education Agency for the 2024–2025 school year.

== Athletics ==
The Elkhart Elks compete in the following sports:

Cross Country, Volleyball, Football, Basketball, Powerlifting, Golf, Tennis, Track, Softball, Baseball, and Fishing.

== Band ==
The Elkhart High School Big Red Band earned the ranking of fourth place at the UIL Area D Marching Contest during the 2022–23 school year.

== Notable alumni ==
- Tye Sheridan (2014), actor
- Jeff Wilson (2014), football player for the Miami Dolphins
