= Copyright status of works by the federal government of the United States =

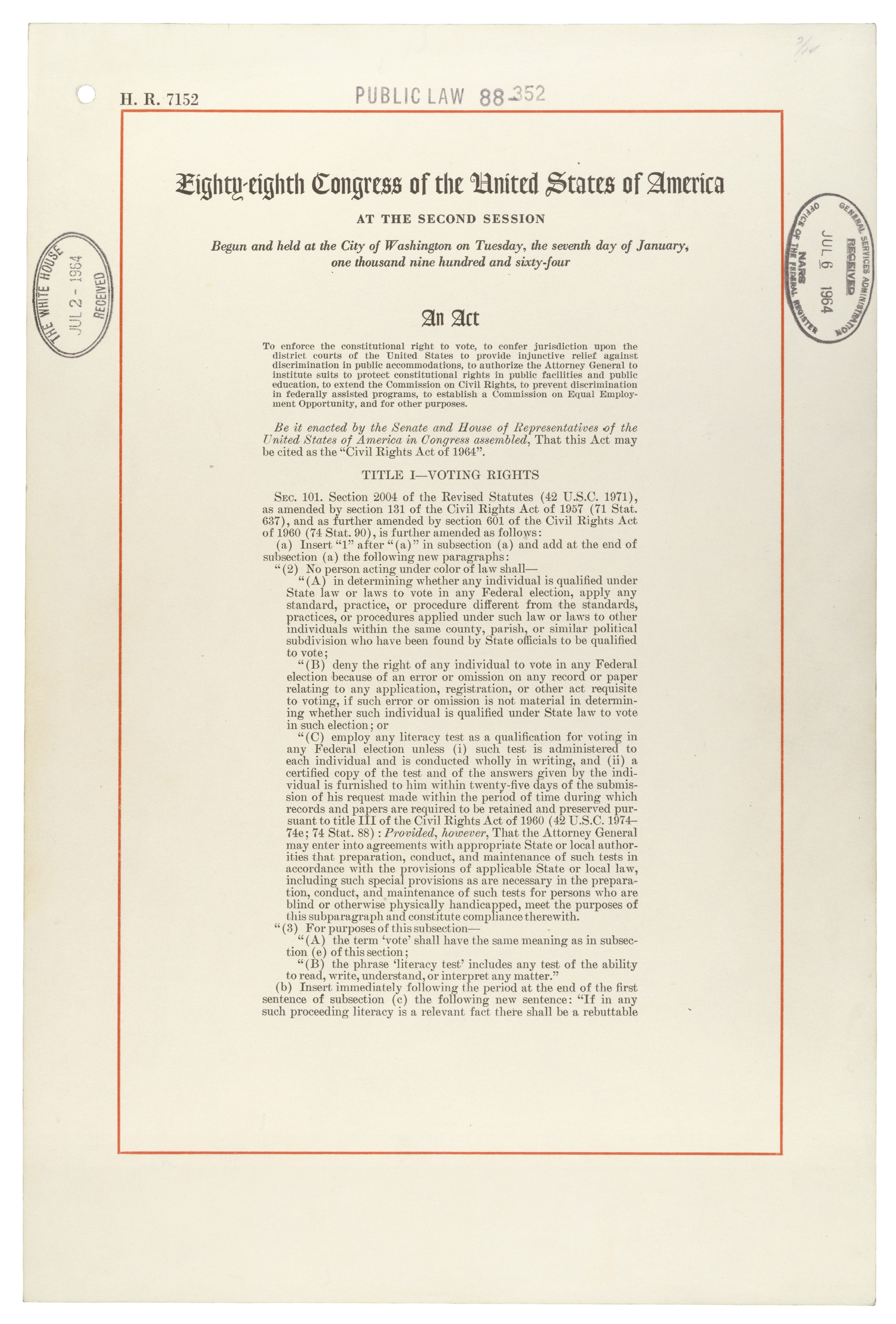
First page of the Civil Rights Act of 1964

Works by the federal government of the United States are not protected by copyright and therefore in the public domain. More specifically, the Copyright Act of 1976 which is codified in Title 17 of the United States code states in section 105: "copyright protection under this title is not available for any work of the United States Government". In section 101, "work of the United States Government" is defined as "a work prepared by an officer or employee of the United States Government as part of that person's official duties."

This act only applies to U.S. domestic copyright as that is the extent of U.S. federal law. The U.S. government asserts that it can still hold the copyright to those works in other countries.

Publication of an otherwise protected work by the U.S. government does not put that work in the public domain. For example, government publications may include works copyrighted by a contractor or grantee, copyrighted material assigned to the U.S. government, or copyrighted information from other sources. Further, the copyright status of works by subnational governments of the United States is governed by its own set of laws.

== History ==
The first Federal statute concerning copyright in government publications was the Printing Law enacted in 1895. Section 52 of that Act provided that copies of "Government Publications" could not be copyrighted.

Prior to 1895, no court decision had occasion to consider any claim of copyright on behalf of the government itself. Courts had, however, considered whether copyright could be asserted as to the text of laws, court decisions, governmental rules, etc., and concluded that such material were not subject to copyright as a matter of public policy. But other material prepared for state governments by their employees – notably the headnotes, syllabi, annotations, etc. prepared by court reporters – had been held copyrightable on behalf of the states.

The Copyright Act of 1909 was the first copyright statute to address government publications. Section 7 of the Act (later codified as Section 8 of title 17 U.S.C.) provided that "No copyright shall subsist ... in any publication of the United States Government, or any reprint, in whole or in part, thereof".

=== Copyright in government works prior to 1895 ===
Prior to the Printing Act of 1895, no statute governed copyright of U.S. government works. Court decisions had established that an employee of the Federal government had no right to claim copyright in a work prepared by him for the government. Other decisions had held that individuals could not have copyright in books consisting of the text of Federal or state court decisions, statutes, rules of judicial procedures, etc., i.e., governmental edicts and rulings. Copyright was denied on the grounds of public policy: such material as the laws and governmental rules and decisions must be freely available to the public and made known as widely as possible; hence there must be no restriction on the reproduction and dissemination of such documents.

While copyright was denied in the text of court decisions, material added by a court reporter on his own – such as leadnotes, syllabi, annotations, indexes, etc. – was deemed copyrightable by him, although he was employed by the government to take down and compile the court decisions. These cases may be said to have established the principle that material prepared by a government employee outside of the scope of the public policy rule was copyrightable; and that the employee who prepared such material on his own could secure copyright therein.

There appears to be no court decision before 1895 dealing directly with the question of whether the United States government might obtain or hold copyright in material not within the public policy rule. But the question did arise with respect to state governments. In the nineteenth century much of the public printing for the states was done under contract by private publishers. The publisher would not bear the expense of printing and publishing, however, unless he could be given exclusive rights. To enable the state to give exclusive rights to a publisher, a number of states enacted statutes providing that court reporters or other state officials who prepared copyrightable material in their official capacity should secure copyright in trust for or on behalf of the state. Such copyrights for the benefit of the state were sustained by the courts.

Two cases before 1895 may also be noted with regard to the question of the rights of individual authors (or their successors) in material prepared for, or acquired by, the United States government. In Heine v. Appleton, an artist was held to have no right to secure copyright in drawings prepared by him as a member of Commodore Perry's expedition, since the drawings belonged to the government. In Folsom v. Marsh, where a collection of letters and other private writings of George Washington had been published and copyrighted by his successors, the purchase of the manuscripts by the United States government was held not to affect the copyright. The contention of the defendant that the government's ownership of the manuscripts made them available for publication by anyone was denied.

=== The Printing Law of 1895 ===
The Printing Law of 1895, which was designed to centralize in the Government Printing Office, the printing, binding, and distribution of federal government documents, contained the first statutory prohibition of copyright in federal government publications. Section 52 of that law provides for the sale by the Public Printer of "duplicate stereotype or electrotype plates from which any Government publication is printed", with the proviso "that no publication reprinted from such stereotype or electrotype plates and no other Government publication shall be copyrighted".

The provision in the Printing Act concerning copyright of government works was probably the result of the "Richardson Affair", which involved an effort in the late 1890s by Representative James D. Richardson (1843–1914) to privately copyright a government-published set of presidential proclamations.

=== The Copyright Act of 1909 ===
Section 7 of the Copyright Act of 1909 (later codified as Section 8 of title 17 U.S.C.) provided that "No copyright shall subsist ... in any publication of the United States Government, or any reprint, in whole or in part, thereof ..." Section 7 also contained a "savings clause", which stated that "The publication or republication by the Government, either separately or in a public document, of any material in which copyright is subsisting shall not be taken to cause any abridgment or annulment of the copyright or to authorize any use or appropriation of such copyright material without the consent of the copyright proprietor." The committee report on the bill that became the Act of 1909 explains that the savings clause was inserted "for the reason that the Government often desires to make use in its publications of copyrighted material, with the consent of the owner of the copyright, and it has been regarded heretofore as necessary to pass a special act every time this was done, providing that such use by the Government should not be taken to give to anyone the right to use the copyrighted material found in the Government publication".

=== The Copyright Act of 1976 ===
The Sections of the Copyright Act that now govern U.S. government work were enacted in 1976 as part of the Copyright Act of 1976. The House Report to the enacted legislation stated that "the basic premise of section 105 of the bill is the same" as section 8 of the former title 17.

==== Derivative works consisting predominantly of government works ====
Section 403 of the 1976 Act introduced a new provision concerning documents consisting preponderantly of one or more government works. In essence, such works would be denied copyright protection unless the required copyright notice included a statement specifically identifying those parts of the work that were not U.S. government work, and therefore subject to copyright protection. According to the House Report, this provision was

aimed at a publishing practice that, while technically justified under the present law, has been the object of considerable criticism. In cases where a federal government work is published or republished commercially, it has frequently been the practice to add some "new matter" in the form of an introduction, editing, illustrations, etc., and to include a general copyright notice in the name of the commercial publisher. This in no way suggests to the public that the bulk of the work is uncopyrightable and therefore free for use.

"To make the notice meaningful rather than misleading", section 403 of the 1976 Act required that, when the copies consist "'preponderantly of one or more works of the United States Government', the copyright notice (if any) identify those parts of the work in which copyright is claimed. A failure to meet this requirement would be treated as an omission of the notice", resulting, absent the application of some exception, in the loss of copyright protection.

=== Derivative works after the Berne Convention Implementation Act of 1988 ===
The Berne Convention Implementation Act of 1988 amended the law to make the use of a copyright notice optional on copies of works published on and after March 1, 1989 and also revised Section 403. After the adoption of this act, a copyright notice was no longer necessary to secure copyright protection. Including the notice, however, does continue to confer certain benefits, notably in the challenging a defendant's claim of innocent infringement, where the question of proper notice may be a factor in assessing damages in infringement actions. Under the revised Section 403, these benefits are denied to a work consisting predominantly U.S. government works "unless the notice of copyright appearing on the published copies or phonorecords to which a defendant in the copyright infringement suit had access includes a statement identifying, either affirmatively or negatively, those portions of the copies or phonorecords embodying any work or works protected under this title".

== Limitations ==
=== Works produced by contractors ===
Unlike works of the U.S. government, works produced by contractors under government contracts are typically protected under U.S. copyright law. The holdership of the copyright depends on the terms of the contract and the type of work undertaken. Contract terms and conditions vary between agencies; contracts to NASA and the military may differ significantly from civilian agency contracts.

Civilian agencies and NASA are guided by the Federal Acquisition Regulations (FAR). There are a number of FAR provisions that can affect the ownership of the copyright. FAR Subpart 27.4—Rights in Data and Copyright provides copyright guidance for the civilian agencies and NASA. Additionally, some agencies may have their own FAR Supplements that they follow.

Under the FAR general data rights clause (FAR 52.227-14), the government has unlimited rights in all data first produced in performance of or delivered under a contract, unless the contractor asserts a claim to copyright or the contract provides otherwise. Unless provided otherwise by an Agency FAR Supplement, a contractor may assert claim to copyright in scientific and technical articles based on or containing data first produced in the performance of a contract and published in academic, technical or professional journals, symposia proceedings, or the like. The express written permission of the Contracting Officer is required before the contractor may assert or enforce the copyright in all other works first produced in the performance of a contract. However, if a contract includes Alternate IV of the clause, the Contracting Officer's approval is not required to assert claim to copyright. Whenever the contractor asserts claim to copyright in works other than computer software, the government, and others acting on its behalf, are granted a license to reproduce, prepare derivative works, distribute, perform and display the copyrighted work. For computer software produced under FAR contract, the scope of the government's license does not include the right to distribute to the public, but for "commercial off the shelf software", the government typically obtains no better license than would any other customer.

=== Transfers ===
The federal government can hold copyrights that are transferred to it. Copyright law's definition of work of the United States government does not include work that the government owns but did not create. For example, in 1837, the federal government purchased former U.S. President James Madison's manuscripts from his widow, Dolley Madison, for $30,000. If this is construed as covering copyright as well as the physical papers, it would be an example of such a transfer.

"Semper Supra", the official song of the United States Space Force, is an example of a work whose copyright was transferred to the federal government. It was composed in 2022 by James Teachenor and Sean Nelson, who gifted the copyright to the Department of the Air Force.

=== Exemptions ===
Works by certain independent agencies, corporations and federal subsidiaries may not be considered "government works" and may, therefore, be copyrightable. For instance, material produced by the United States Postal Service are typically subject to normal copyright. Most USPS materials, artwork, and design and all postage stamps as of January 1, 1978, or after are subject to copyright laws. Works of the former United States Post Office Department are in the public domain (due to its former position as a cabinet department).

15 U.S.C. § 290e authorizes U.S. Secretary of Commerce to secure copyright for works produced by the Department of Commerce under the Standard Reference Data Act. National Defense Authorization Act (NDAA), FY2020, granted civilian members of the faculty at twelve federal government institutions the authority to retain and own copyright of works produced in the course of employment for publication by a scholarly press or journal.

=== State, territorial, and local governments ===
The lack of copyright protection for works of the United States government does not apply to works of U.S. subnational governments. Thus, works created by a state or local government may be subject to copyright. Some states have placed much of their work into the public domain by waiving some or all of their rights under copyright law. For example, the constitution and laws of Florida have placed its government's works in the public domain. Unorganized territories (such as American Samoa and the former Trust Territory of the Pacific Islands) are treated, for copyright purposes, as the U.S. government. Their works therefore fall under § 105 and lack copyright protection.

=== Other restrictions ===
Certain works, particularly logos and emblems of government agencies, while not copyrightable, are still protected by other laws that are similar in effect to trademark laws. Such laws are intended to protect indicators of source or quality. For example, some uses of the Central Intelligence Agency logo, name, and initialism are regulated under the CIA Act of 1949 (50 U.S.C. § 403m).

== Edicts of government ==
The United States Copyright Office considers "edicts of government", such as judicial opinions, administrative rulings, legislative enactments, public ordinances, and similar official legal documents, not copyrightable for reasons of public policy. This applies to such works whether they are federal, state, or local as well as to those of foreign governments.

== See also ==
- Classified information in the United States
- Public.Resource.Org
- Comparison of free and open-source software licenses
- Creative Commons licenses and List of free-content licenses
- Copyright status of works by subnational governments of the United States
- Freedom of Information Act
- List of public domain projects
- Open data in the United States
- Public domain

=== In other countries ===
- Crown copyright
- National Data Sharing and Accessibility Policy – Government of India
