= Kendrick, Mississippi =

- Unincorporated community
- Location within Mississippi Location within the United States
- Country: United States
- State: Mississippi
- County: Alcorn
- Elevation: 459 ft (140 m)
- Time zone: UTC-6 (Central (CST))
  - Summer (DST): UTC-5 (CDT)
- Area code: 662
- GNIS feature ID: 672096

Kendrick is an unincorporated community in the U.S. state of Mississippi, in Alcorn County. Kendrick is located about 7 miles (11 km) east of the seat of Alcorn County, Corinth, 6 miles (10 km) south of the Tennessee border, and 18 miles (29 km) west of the Alabama border. A post office operated under the name Kendrick from 1889 to 1943. Kendrick was named for the Allen Kendrick and Carroll Kendrick family.
