= John Parker (pioneer) =

American frontiersman, soldier, surveyor, minister and diplomat (1758–1836)

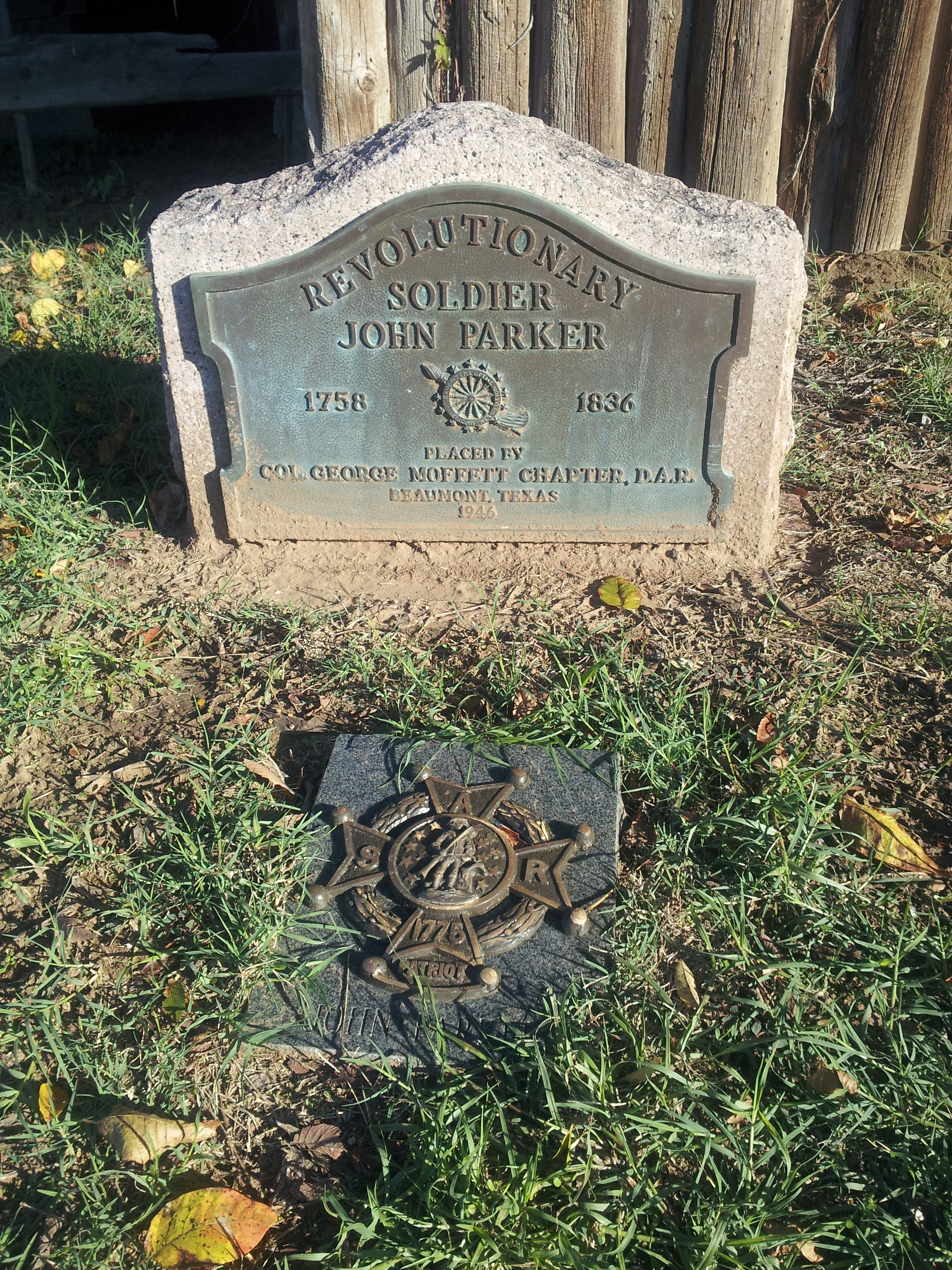
- A marker to John Parker at Old Fort Parker
- Born: September 6, 1758; Baltimore County, Maryland
- Died: May 19, 1836 (aged 77); Fort Parker, Texas
- Children: Daniel Parker, James W. Parker
- Relatives: Rachel Parker, Cynthia Ann Parker, John Richard Parker, Peta Nocona, Quanah Parker Carroll Kendrick, Allen Kendrick
- Military career
- Allegiance: United States (1777–1794); Texas (1833–1836)
- Branch: Continental Army (1777–1783); Georgia Militia (1785–1794); Texian Militia (1833–1836); Texas Rangers (1833–1836)
- Conflicts: American Revolutionary War; Chickamauga Wars; Comanche Wars; Fort Parker massacre †

John Parker (September 6, 1758 – May 19, 1836) was an American frontiersman, soldier, surveyor, minister and diplomat. He was born in 1758 in Baltimore County, Maryland. At a young age, Parker's family moved from Maryland to Virginia, where they took part in scouting the frontier in present-day Kentucky and Tennessee alongside Daniel Boone and other American pioneers. After the outbreak of the American Revolutionary War in 1776, frontier conflicts between Patriot settlers and British-allied Indians erupted, which led to the deaths of several of Parker's family members and friends. Parker enlisted in the Continental Army and participated in numerous Patriot campaigns in the western theater of the American Revolutionary War.

During the conflict, Parker married a woman named Sarah White in November 1779. Parker eventually returned to Virginia, where White gave birth to a son named Daniel in Culpeper County on April 6, 1781. After the war ended in 1783, conflicts on the frontier continued as American settlers expanded westward, and Parker moved with his family to Georgia in 1785. There, he enlisted in the Georgia Militia and participated in raids against the Cherokee during the Chickamauga Wars. During the Northwest Indian War, Parker worked for the federal government as a diplomat and surveyor. In 1803, Parker was given a land grant near Nashville as reward for his service during the Revolutionary War and moved there with his family.

By 1817, he had eleven children, many of whom had already established families of their own. Parker was also rewarded with additional land grants for his services in the Northwest Indian War in the Ohio Country, moving again to Crawford County, Illinois, where he became a minister in the Predestinarian church. In 1824, White died, and Parker remarried to Sarah Duty (whose daughters had already married some of Parker's sons) a year later. Parker was eventually recruited by Stephen F. Austin, on the behalf of the Mexican government, to settle in Texas as one of a group of settlers (referred to as "Texians") known as the "Old Three Hundred". After extensive negotiations with Austin, Parker agreed to settle in Texas in 1833.

From 1834 to 1836, Parker, by now a member of the Texian Militia, negotiated with local Indian tribes, scouted the Texas frontier, and constructed Fort Parker near the Navasota River in Limestone County. The fort, located near present-day Groesbeck, Texas, was situated near the boundaries of the Comancheria and built to protect Texian settlers against Comanche raids. While in Texas, Parker joined the Texas Rangers unit of the Texian Militia. In May 1836, the Comanche, along with allied Kiowa, Caddo, and Wichita tribals, launched a large-scale raid on Texian frontier settlements, including Fort Parker. On May 19, after 100–600 Indian raiders had overrun outlying blockhouses and settlements, they assaulted Fort Parker itself.

Parker unsuccessfully attempted to rally local settlers into resisting the raiders before ordering as many women and children as possible to be escorted away from the area, guarded by several hand-picked men. Parker subsequently led a sortie against the raiders before escaping back into the fort, which was soon overran by the Indians, who captured Parker alive and ritually tortured and scalped him, killing him. Though Duty was wounded in the raid, she managed to escape along with a son, warning nearby settlers of the raid. Four of Parker's sons were killed by the raiders, while five members of the Parker family were captured; these included Parker's granddaughter Cynthia, who was adopted into the Comanche.
