= Franklin College (Tennessee) =

Defunct private college in Davidson County, Tennessee, US

- Type: Private liberal arts college
- Established: January 30, 1844
- Founders: Rev. Tolbert Fanning
- Religious affiliation: Christian Church
- Location: Davidson County, Tennessee

Franklin College was a private liberal arts college in Davidson County, Tennessee, founded by Rev. Tolbert Fanning in 1844. It closed at the outbreak of the American Civil War. Enrollment had been between 100 and 130 boys. Agriculture was part of its curriculum and a farm was connected to it.

== History ==
Franklin College was founded by Rev. Tolbert Fanning on January 30, 1844, in Davidson County, Tennessee, where the Nashville International Airport is presently located, as part of the 19th-century Restoration Movement. Fanning served as president of the college until 1861. Operations were disrupted when a majority of the students joined the Confederate army during the American Civil War. The college building burned down around this time and the students relocated to Hope Institute nearby. Minerva College was a sister school established in 1849 for female students

== Notable alumni ==
Alumni of the college included Andrew J. Caldwell, James B. Frazier, Joseph B. Killebrew, T. B. Larimore, David Lipscomb, William Lipscomb, Samuel R. Lowery, James D. Richardson, William R. Cox, Robert Toombs, J. E. Scobey, and K. M. Van Zandt.
