= Samuel R. Lowery =

American lawyer

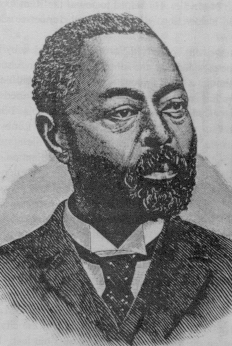
- Born: December 9, 1830 or 1832; Davidson County, Tennessee
- Died: c. 1900
- Occupations: Preacher, Lawyer
- Political party: Republican

Samuel R. Lowery (December 9, 1830 or 1832 – c. 1900) was an American preacher and lawyer. In 1880, he was admitted to practice before the United States Supreme Court upon the motion of Belva Ann Lockwood.

== Early life ==
Samuel R. Lowery was born December 9, 1830 or 1832 near Nashville, Tennessee. His father, Peter, was an African American slave and his mother was a Cherokee Indian. His mother died when Samuel was eight years old. Together with his father, Peter Lowery, Lowery worked at Franklin College and studied under the Christian preacher, Tolbert Fanning. At sixteen he taught in school for four years. In 1849, his father purchased his family's freedom and joined the Church of the Disciples and became the church's first black preacher. Samuel also converted and began preaching. In 1857, he moved to Cincinnati, Ohio and continued preaching there. In 1858 he married and moved to Chatham, Ontario (the West Canada) where he remained for three years before returning to the US and moving to a farm given to him by his father near West Lancaster in Fayette County, Ohio.

In 1863, after the Emancipation Proclamation was issued, he went to Nashville to preach to the black soldiers and freedmen in the area. At the time, Colonel R. K. Crawford of the 40th United States Colored Troops was in command and Lowery was denied commission as chaplain of the regiment. Instead, he was transferred to the 9th United States Heavy Artillery U.S. Colored Troops where he received a commission as chaplain. He also was a teacher for the 2nd U. S. Colored Light Artillery U.S. Colored Troops, Battery A.

== Teaching and law ==
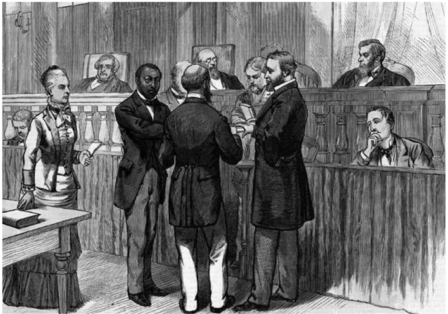
Illustration from Frank Leslie's Illustrated Newspaper showing Samuel Lowery's Supreme Court bar admission

After the war, he moved his family to Rutherford County, Tennessee where he continued to teach and preach. Lowery and his father founded a black university, the Tennessee Manual Labor University in 1867 in Ebenezer, Tennessee near Murfreesboro based on the model of Franklin College. He also began studying law.

The school began to struggle in 1872, with reasons given including financial improprieties and the Ku Klux Klan. The accusations of financial improprieties were based on an 1872 fundraising tour of the north by Lowery and another teacher, Daneil Wadkins. The pair, who were black and Republican, were not supported by white, largely Democratic, Disciples who frequently criticized the school and reportedly felt that success in the black school would undermine white superiority. Lowery and Wadkins were accused of mismanaging the funds and expelled from the church. Without support, further fundraising efforts failed and the school closed in 1874.

Lowery moved back to Nashville, where he was admitted to the bar and began practicing law. In 1875, he moved to Huntsville, Alabama. Lowery was sponsored to the Supreme Court Bar by Belva Ann Lockwood, the first woman admitted to the bar, February 2, 1880. Lowery has been wrongly claimed as the fifth Black attorney admitted to the Supreme Court Bar and first to argue a case before that court, despite never arguing any cases before the Supreme Court. The first Black attorney to argue before the Supreme Court was instead Everett J. Waring in Jones v. United States (1890).

== Silk cultivation and industry ==
About 1874, his ten-year-old daughter, Annie L. Lowery, attended an exhibition of silkworms by Lewis Theobald and persuaded her father to buy some silkworm eggs. Annie began to raise silkworms on white mulberry trees at their home in Huntsville. Annie died in 1877, and Samuel continued her work. He met with other major silk manufacturers in the United States, including Frank Cheney, brother of Ward Cheney and John Kyle of Paterson, New Jersey. In 1875, Lowery established the Lowery Industrial Academy, and later founded the S. R. and R. M. Lowery Industrial Silk Culture and Manufacturing Company. Lowery believed that black workers in the south would be ideal workers in the industry, comparing the work to work in cotton fields.

In 1879, Lowery was the editor of a newspaper, the National Freeman, in Huntsville. In 1880 he established a cooperative community in Jefferson County, Alabama called Loweryvale. He spent much of his later career advocating the silk industry. He won awards for his silk at international exhibitions in Louisville in the 1880s, New Orleans in 1884, and Omaha in 1898. He also traveled to Washington DC a number of times to seek federal aid for the industry. In August 1900, Lowery traveled to Boston for the meetings led by Booker T. Washington which founded the National Negro Business League. Lowery died around that year, and his silk farm continued at least until November 1902.
