= Printing Act of 1895 =

American copyright law

- Other short titles: Public Printing Act of 1895
- Long title: An Act Providing for the public printing and binding and the distribution of public documents.
- Enacted by: the 53rd United States Congress
- Effective: January 12, 1895

Citations
- Statutes at Large: 28 Stat. 601

Legislative history
- Introduced in the House as H.R. 2650; Passed the House on; Passed the Senate on; Signed into law by President Grover Cleveland on January 12, 1895

The Printing Act of 1895 was a law designed to centralize in the United States Government Printing Office the printing, binding, and distribution of U.S. Government documents. The Act revised public printing laws and established the roles of the Federal Depository Library Program (FDLP) and the Government Printing Office (GPO) in distributing government information. The act also assigned leadership of the program to the Superintendent of Public Documents, who would be under the control of the GPO.

The Printing Act is also significant because it contained the first statutory prohibition of copyright in Government publications.

== The Richardson Affair and prohibition on copyright of government works ==
Section 52 of the Printing Act, which is still in force, provides for the sale by the Public Printer of "duplicate stereotype or electrotype plates from which any Government publication is printed", with the proviso "that no publication reprinted from such stereotype or electrotype plates and no other Government publication shall be copyrighted."

This prohibition was probably the result of the "Richardson Affair", which involved Representative James D. Richardson (1843–1914) who, at the time, was the Chairman of the Joint Committee on Printing.

At the time when the Printing Act was being considered, the Joint Committee on Printing was in the process of preparing for publication a compilation of the "Messages and Papers of the Presidents of the United States."

In the Printing bill as presented by the Joint Committee to the House, section 53 (which later became section 52 of the Law of 1895) provided for the sale of duplicate plates by the Public Printer, this provision apparently having been suggested by Mr. Richardson with a view to facilitating the private republication of the Presidential Messages. Section 53 was attacked on the floor of the House on the ground that private persons might assert copyright claims upon republishing Government documents from the plates." It was then proposed that a proviso be added to section 53 "that no publication reprinted from such stereotype or electrotype plates shall be copyrighted." The opposition was not satisfied with that but accepted a further proposal that the proviso be extended by inserting the words "and no other Government publication." The bill was passed with the proviso in that form.

Perhaps the opposition had anticipated and sought to forestall what happened subsequently: After several volumes of the Presidential Messages were compiled by Mr. Richardson and Congress authorized them to be printed and distributed by the Government Printing Office, some of the volumes were printed with a copyright notice in the name of Mr. Richardson.

When this was questioned in Congress, Representative Richardson said that he was not claiming copyright as against the Government but only against third persons, and that his claim was limited to the original matter created by his editorial work. Other members of Congress expressed the view that he had no right to claim copyright in the product of his editorial work since it was produced for a publication authorized by Congress. Subsequently the Senate Committee on Printing reviewed the matter and expressed its opinion that the proviso in section 52 precluded Mr. Richardson's claim of copyright.
