= Carroll Kendrick =

American politician

- c. 1916

President pro tempore of the Mississippi State Senate
- In office January 1916 – January 1920
- Preceded by: A. C. Anderson
- Succeeded by: J. D. Fatheree

Member of the Mississippi Senate from the 37th district
- In office January 1912 – January 1920
- Succeeded by: Edward Strickland
- In office January 1904 – January 1908
- In office 1890 – January 1900

Member of the Mississippi House of Representatives from the Tishomingo County district
- In office January 1884 – January 1888

Personal details
- Born: May 24, 1852 Hardin County, Tennessee, U.S.
- Died: February 17, 1923 (aged 70)
- Party: Democratic
- Relatives: Allen Kendrick, Carroll Kendrick

Carroll Kendrick (May 24, 1852 – February 17, 1923) was a Mississippi state legislator in the late 19th and early 20th centuries. He was the President Pro Tempore of the Mississippi State Senate from 1916 to 1920.

== Biography ==
Carroll Kendrick was born on May 24, 1852, near Hamburg, in Hardin County, Tennessee. He was the son of Allen Kendrick and Nancy (Rose) Kendrick. He was named for his uncle, Christian Church minister Carroll Kendrick. He graduated from the Iuka Normal Institute with an A. B., and from Hiram College with a M. A. degree. In 1873, he graduated from the University of Louisville with an M. D. degree. During Reconstruction, he was a member of the Ku Klux Klan.

== Political career ==
From 1884 to 1888, he served in the Mississippi House of Representatives, representing Tishomingo County as a Democrat. He was then in the Mississippi State Senate, representing the state's 37th district, which was composed of the state's Tishomingo, Alcorn, and Prentiss counties, from 1890 to 1900. He was re-elected in 1903, for the 1904–1908 term, and in 1911, for the 1912–1916 term. In 1907, he was the president of Mississippi's state Medical Association. Kendrick was re-elected to the Senate for the 1916–1920 term, in which he also served the position of president pro tempore. Kendrick died on February 17, 1923.
