= Jeff Wilson (American football) =

American football player (born 1995)

Jeff Wilson Jr.
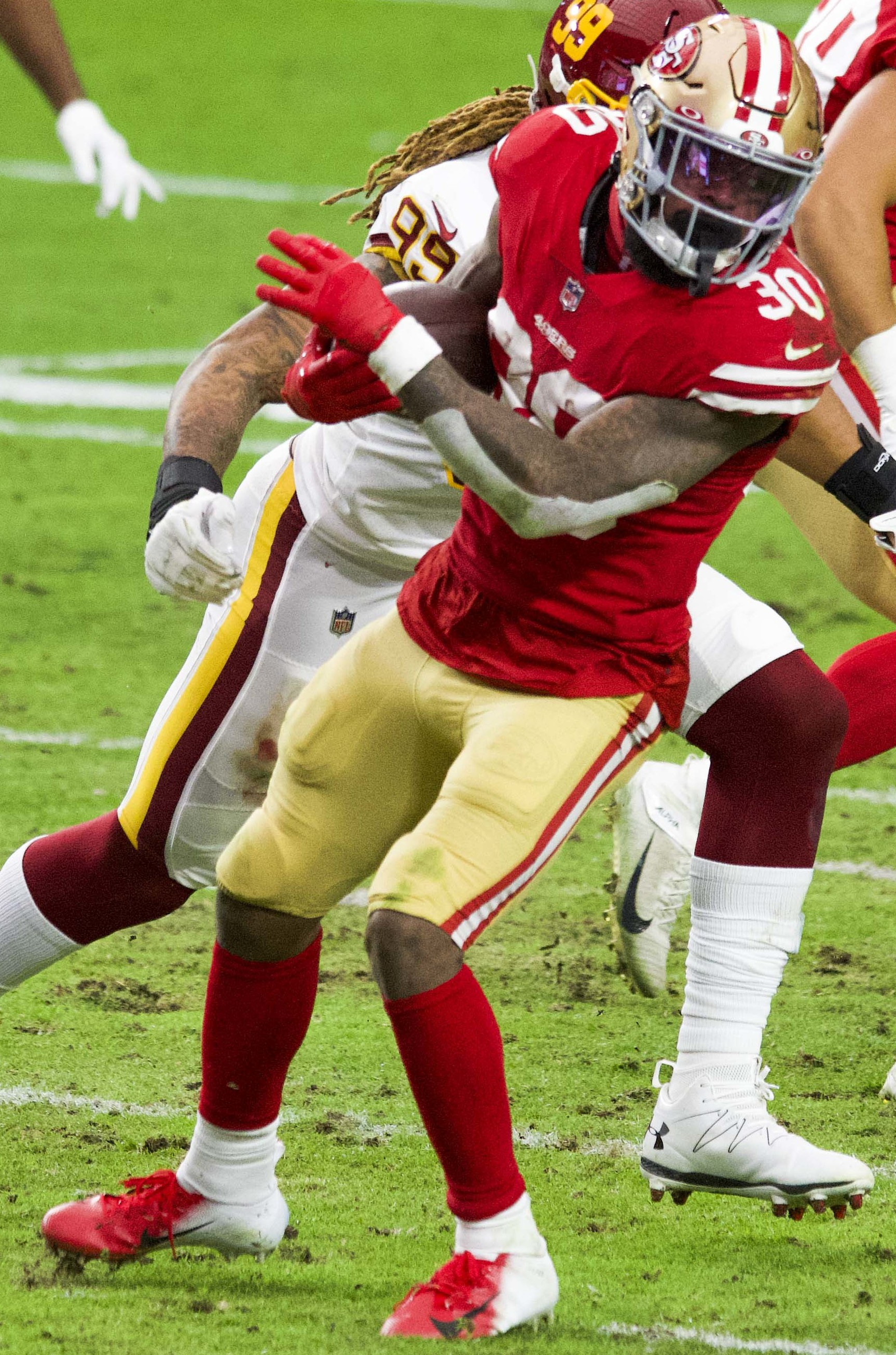
- Wilson with the San Francisco 49ers in a 2020 game against the Washington Redskins

Profile
- Position: Running back

Personal information
- Born: November 16, 1995 (age 30); Palestine, Texas, U.S.
- Listed height: 6 ft 0 in (1.83 m)
- Listed weight: 213 lb (97 kg)

Career information
- High school: Elkhart (Elkhart, Texas)
- College: North Texas (2014–2017)
- NFL draft: 2018: undrafted

Career history
- San Francisco 49ers (2018–2022); Miami Dolphins (2022–2024); San Francisco 49ers (2025)*; Miami Dolphins (2025)
- * Offseason or practice squad member only

Awards and highlights
- Second-team All-CUSA (2017)

Career NFL statistics as of 2025
- Rushing yards: 2,370
- Rushing average: 4.5
- Rushing touchdowns: 18
- Receptions: 74
- Receiving yards: 585
- Receiving touchdowns: 5
- Stats at Pro Football Reference

Jeffery Wilson Jr. (born November 16, 1995) is an American professional football running back. He played college football for the North Texas Mean Green and signed with the San Francisco 49ers as an undrafted free agent in 2018. Wilson has also played for the Miami Dolphins.

== Early life ==
Wilson attended and played high school football at Elkhart High School in Elkhart, Texas. He was named an Associated Press Class 2A first-team all-state as a senior after rushing for 2,749 yards and 36 touchdowns. A two-star running back recruit, Wilson committed to North Texas over offers from Louisiana-Monroe, New Mexico State, and Texas State.

== College career ==
Wilson appeared in 41 games (29 starts) during his four-year career at North Texas.

As a senior in 2017, Wilson started 11 games, rushing for 1,215 yards (6.5 YPC) and 16 touchdowns, and recorded 24 receptions for 168 yards. He was named Second-Team All-Conference USA for his efforts.

Wilson finished his college career with 562 carries for 3,205 yards and 32 touchdowns to go along with 70 receptions for 527 yards and two touchdowns. Wilson ranked third in rushing touchdowns (32) and fourth in rushing yards (3,205) in school history.

=== College statistics ===
Season	Team	Conf	Class	Pos	GP	Rushing				Receiving			
Season	Team	Conf	Class	Pos	GP	Att	Yds	Avg	TD	Rec	Yds	Avg	TD
2014	North Texas	CUSA	FR	RB	9	50	224	4.5	1	5	41	8.2	1
2015	North Texas	CUSA	SO	RB	10	154	829	5.4	1	12	71	5.9	0
2016	North Texas	CUSA	JR	RB	11	169	936	5.5	14	29	247	8.5	1
2017	North Texas	CUSA	SR	RB	11	188	1,215	6.5	16	24	168	7.0	0
Career					41	561	3,204	5.7	32	70	527	7.5	2

== Professional career ==
Pre-draft measurables
Height	Weight	Arm length	Hand span	40-yard dash	10-yard split	20-yard split	20-yard shuttle	Three-cone drill	Vertical jump	Broad jump	Bench press
5 ft 11 1/2 in (1.82 m)	210 lb (95 kg)	31 1/2 in (0.80 m)	9 1/4 in (0.23 m)	4.57 s	1.60 s	2.58 s	4.29 s	7.20 s	35.0 in (0.89 m)	9 ft 2 in (2.79 m)	15 reps
All values from NFL Combine/Pro Day

=== San Francisco 49ers (first stint) ===
==== 2018 season ====
Wilson signed with the San Francisco 49ers as an undrafted free agent on May 1, 2018. He was waived on September 1, but was signed to the practice squad the next day.

Wilson was promoted to the active roster on November 24 and made his NFL debut the following day against the Tampa Bay Buccaneers. Wilson finished the 27–9 road loss with seven carries for 33 yards. During Week 13 against the Seattle Seahawks, he had 15 carries for 61 yards and eight receptions for 73 yards in the 43–16 road loss. In the next game against the Denver Broncos, Wilson recorded 23 carries for 90 yards and a six-yard reception during the 20–14 victory. The following week against the Seahawks, he rushed seven times for 46 yards.

Wilson finished his rookie year with 66 carries for 266 yards and 12 receptions for 98 yards in six games and two starts.

==== 2019 season ====
On August 31, 2019, Wilson was waived by the 49ers and was signed to the practice squad the next day.

Wilson was promoted to the active roster after Tevin Coleman was injured in the season opener against the Buccaneers. During Week 2 against the Cincinnati Bengals, Wilson had 10 carries for 34 yards and two touchdowns in the 41–17 road victory. In the next game against the Pittsburgh Steelers, he rushed eight times for 18 yards and two touchdowns during the 24–20 victory. During a Week 11 36–26 victory over the Arizona Cardinals, Wilson scored the game-winning touchdown on a 25-yard reception from Jimmy Garoppolo for his first NFL receiving touchdown.

Wilson finished his second professional season with 27 carries for 105 yards and four touchdowns along with three receptions for 34 yards and a touchdown in 10 games and no starts. The 49ers reached Super Bowl LIV, but lost 31–20 to the Kansas City Chiefs. During the Super Bowl, Wilson had a 20-yard reception.

==== 2020 season ====
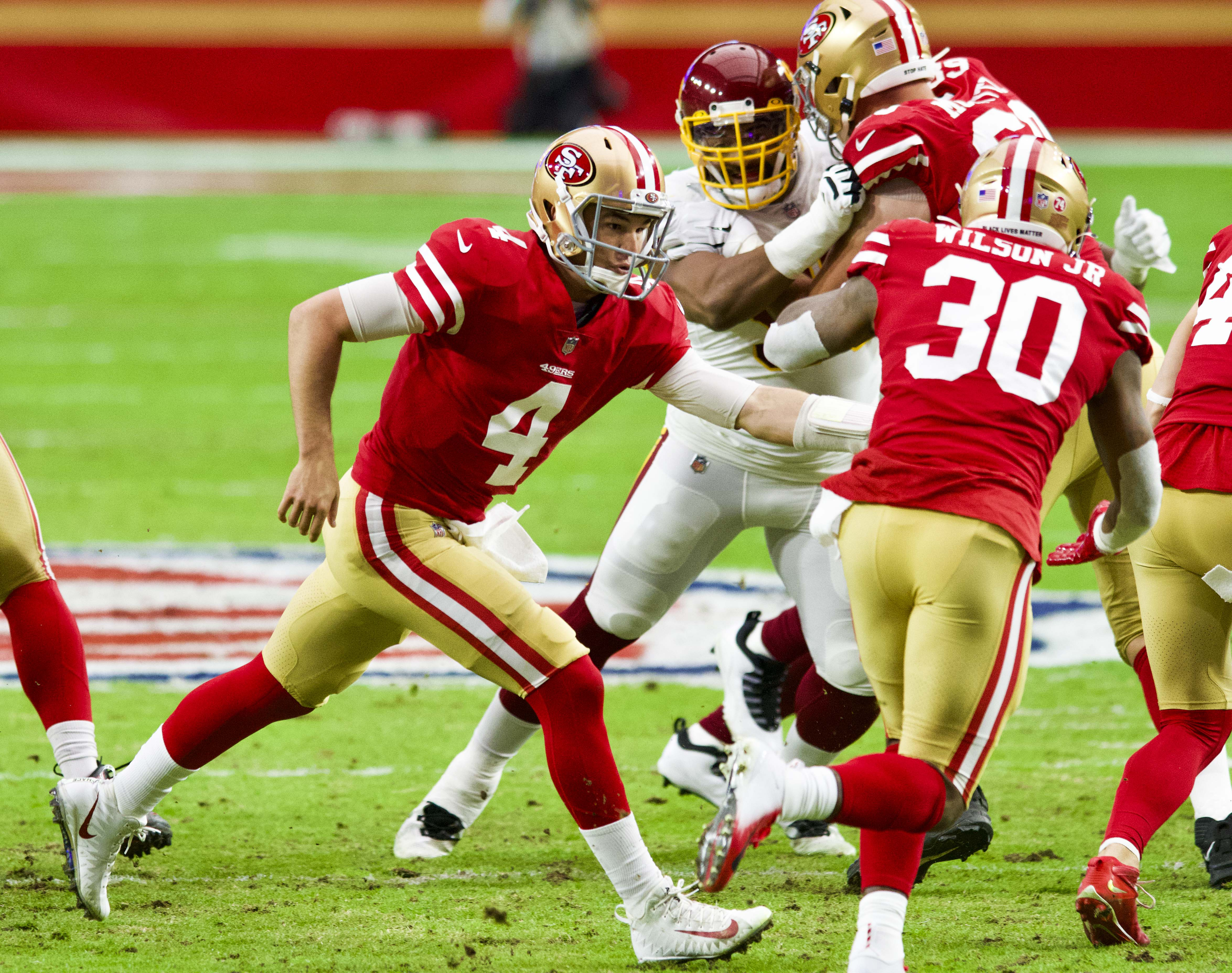
Wilson (#30) in 2020

On April 20, 2020, Wilson was re-signed by the 49ers to a one-year contract. He was placed on the reserve/COVID-19 list by the team on July 30, and was activated five days later.

During a Week 3 36–9 road victory against the New York Giants, Wilson rushed for 15 yards and a touchdown and caught three passes for 54 yards and a touchdown. During Week 7 against the New England Patriots, he recorded 17 carries for 112 yards and three touchdowns to go along with two receptions for eight yards before leaving the eventual 33–6 road victory with a high-ankle sprain. Wilson was placed on injured reserve on October 31. He was activated on November 28.

During a Week 14 23–15 loss to the Washington Football Team, Wilson had 11 carries for 31 yards and a touchdown to go along with a 13-yard reception. In the next game against the Dallas Cowboys, he rushed 16 times for 60 yards and a touchdown during the 41–33 road loss. The following week against the Cardinals, Wilson recorded carrier highs with 22 carries for 183 yards to go along with a 21-yard touchdown reception in the 20–12 road victory. In the regular-season finale against the Seahawks, he had 20 carries for 76 yards and a touchdown to go along with three receptions for 12 yards and a touchdown during the 26–23 loss.

Wilson finished the 2020 season with 126 carries for 600 yards and seven touchdowns to go along with 13 receptions for 133 yards and three touchdowns in 12 games and three starts.

==== 2021 season ====
Wilson signed a one-year contract extension with the 49ers on January 26, 2021.

On May 25, 2021, it was announced that Wilson tore his meniscus and would miss four to six months. He was placed on the reserve/PUP list on August 31. Wilson was activated on November 6.

Wilson made his season debut in Week 10 against the Los Angeles Rams on Monday Night Football and rushed 10 times for 28 yards during the 31–10 victory. During a Week 15 31–13 victory over the Atlanta Falcons, Wilson recorded 21 carries for a season-high 110 yards and a touchdown to go along with two receptions for nine yards. In the next game against the Tennessee Titans on Thursday Night Football, he had 14 carries for 45 yards and a touchdown to go along with three receptions for 12 yards during the 20–17 road loss.

Wilson finished the 2021 season with 79 carries for 294 yards and two touchdowns to go along with seven receptions for 31 yards in nine games and four starts.

==== 2022 season ====
On March 29, 2022, Wilson re-signed with the 49ers.

During a Week 4 24–9 victory over the Rams on Monday Night Football, Wilson rushed 18 times for 74 yards and his first touchdown of the season. In the next game against the Carolina Panthers, he had 17 carries for 120 yards and a touchdown to go along with a 12-yard reception during the 37–15 road victory.

=== Miami Dolphins (first stint) ===
==== 2022 season ====
On November 1, 2022, the 49ers traded Wilson to the Miami Dolphins in exchange for a fifth-round pick in the 2023 NFL draft.

Wilson made his Dolphins debut during a Week 9 35–32 road victory over the Chicago Bears, recording nine carries for 51 yards to go along with three receptions for 21 yards and a touchdown. In the next game against the Cleveland Browns, Wilson had 17 carries for 119 yards and a touchdown to go along with two receptions for 24 yards during the 39–17 victory. Two weeks later against the Houston Texans, he recorded 13 carries for 39 yards and a touchdown to go along with a 13-yard reception in the 30–15 victory. During a Week 16 26–20 loss to the Green Bay Packers, Wilson rushed nine times for 37 yards and a touchdown.

In 16 games and seven starts on the 49ers and Dolphins rosters during the 2022 season, Wilson accumulated 176 carries for 860 yards and five touchdowns to go along with 22 receptions for 185 yards and a touchdown. During the Wild Card Round against the Buffalo Bills, he had 10 carries for 23 yards and a touchdown to go along with a 13-yard reception during the 34–31 road loss.

==== 2023 season ====
Wilson signed a two-year contract extension with the Dolphins on March 16, 2023. He was placed on injured reserve on August 31. Wilson was activated on October 21.

Wilson made his season debut in Week 7 against the Philadelphia Eagles and finished the 31–17 road loss with a four-yard reception.

Wilson finished the 2023 season with 41 carries for 188 yards and 14 receptions for 85 yards in 10 games and no starts. During the Wild Card Round against the Chiefs, he had a six-yard reception in the 26–7 road loss.

==== 2024 season ====
Wilson finished the 2024 season with 16 carries for 57 yards and three receptions for 19 yards in nine games and no starts.

=== San Francisco 49ers (second stint) ===
On August 10, 2025, Wilson re-signed with the 49ers. He was released on August 26 as part of final roster cuts.

=== Miami Dolphins (second stint) ===
On August 28, 2025, Wilson signed with the Dolphins' practice squad. Nine days later, he was elevated from the practice squad for the season-opener.

== NFL career statistics ==
=== Regular season ===
Year	Team	Games		Rushing					Receiving					Fumbles	
Year	Team	GP	GS	Att	Yds	Avg	Lng	TD	Rec	Yds	Avg	Lng	TD	Fum	Lost
2018	SF	6	2	66	266	4.0	18	0	12	98	8.2	24	0	3	2
2019	SF	10	0	27	105	3.9	25	4	3	34	11.3	25T	1	0	0
2020	SF	12	3	126	600	4.8	34	7	13	133	10.2	21	3	2	2
2021	SF	9	4	79	294	3.7	17	2	7	31	4.4	11	0	1	0
2022	SF	8	6	92	468	5.1	41	2	10	91	9.1	16	0	2	2
2022	MIA	8	1	84	392	4.7	28	3	12	94	7.8	14	1	1	0
2023	MIA	10	0	41	188	4.6	15	0	14	85	6.1	12	0	0	0
2024	MIA	9	0	16	57	3.6	14	0	3	19	6.7	7	0	0	0
2025	MIA	3	0	0	0	0.0	0	0	0	0	0.0	0	0	0	0
Career		75	16	531	2,370	4.5	41	18	74	585	7.9	25T	5	9	6

=== Postseason ===
Year	Team	Games		Rushing					Receiving					Fumbles	
Year	Team	GP	GS	Att	Yds	Avg	Lng	TD	Rec	Yds	Avg	Lng	TD	Fum	Lost
2019	SF	1	0	0	0	0.0	0	0	1	20	20.0	20	0	0	0
2021	SF	2	0	0	0	0.0	0	0	0	0	0.0	0	0	0	0
2022	MIA	1	1	10	23	2.3	6	1	1	13	13.0	13	0	0	0
2023	MIA	1	0	0	0	0.0	0	0	1	6	6.0	6	0	0	0
Career		5	1	10	23	2.3	6	1	3	39	13.0	20	0	0	0
