= The Compilation of the Messages and Papers of the Presidents =

Series of documents from American presidents

The Compilation of the Messages and Papers of the Presidents is an eleven-volume series comprising proclamations, special messages, and inauguration speeches from several presidents throughout United States history. There are ten numbered volumes each covering a set of presidents between the years of 1787 and 1902 and an eleventh index volume.

The initial set was copyrighted in 1897 by James D. Richardson, a representative from the state of Tennessee, and was published in 1911 by the Bureau of National Literature and Art. The private copyright of these public documents became a political dispute known as the Richardson Affair and copyright of such works was prohibited in 1895, eventually leading to a comprehensive prohibition on copyright of works of the federal government.

There is also a supplement version that covers individual presidents in depth and was published, also by the Bureau of National Literature, but in 1917. A typical volume has the Seal of the President emblazoned in the front and the back. The original first edition was printed in 1899 by the Government Printing Office. In 1911, there was a third printing and contained 20 volumes. There was no eleventh volume in the first printing. The index is contained in the tenth volume. These volumes are brown and have no seal.

== Contents ==
=== Volume one ===
The original first edition was printed in 1899 by the Government Printing Office. Only 6,000 copies were printed and presented to members of Congress and Senate. Two thousand for the use of the Senate and four thousand for the use of Congress. In 1911, there was a third printing and contained 20 volumes. There was no eleventh volume in the first printing. The index is contained in the tenth volume. These volumes are brown and have no seal.

The first edition of the series was first presented to Congress and the press on May 1, 1896, to much public acclaim. On May 22, Congress ordered 15,000 copies of the publication to be printed and distributed among the general public. It covers the terms of George Washington, John Adams, Thomas Jefferson, and James Madison between 1797 and 1817.

=== Volume two ===
Volume Two covers the presidential terms of James Monroe, John Quincy Adams, Andrew Jackson, and a little of Martin Van Buren. The Treasury Department at Washington, D.C. is illustrated as the frontispiece and includes the portraits of John Quincy Adams, Andrew Jackson, and Martin Van Buren.

=== Volume three ===
Volume Three finishes the office of Andrew Jackson and covers the term of Martin Van Buren. These occur between 1837 and 1841.

=== Volume four IV ===
- Part 1: William Henry Harrison, March 4 to April 4, 1841
- Part 2: John Tyler, April 4, 1841, to March 4, 1845
- Part 3: James K. Polk, March 4, 1845, to March 4, 1849

=== Volume five V ===
- Parts 1 and 2: Zachary Taylor, March 5, 1849, to July 9, 1850, and Millard Fillmore, July 10, 1850, to March 4, 1853
- Part 3: Franklin Pierce, March 4, 1853, to March 4, 1857
- Part 4: James Buchanan, March 4, 1857, to March 4, 1861

=== Volume six VI ===
- Part 1: Abraham Lincoln, March 4, 1861, to April 15, 1865
- Part 2: Andrew Johnson, April 15, 1865, to March 4, 1869

=== Volume seven VII ===
- Part 1: Ulysses S. Grant, March 4, 1869, to March 4, 1877
- Part 2: Rutherford B. Hayes, March 4, 1877, to March 4, 1881

=== Volume eight VIII ===
- Part 1: James A. Garfield: March 14 to September 19, 1881
- Part 2: Chester A. Arthur, September 19, 1881, to March 4, 1885
- Part 3: Grover Cleveland, March 4, 1885, to March 4, 1889

=== Volume nine lX ===
- Part 1: Benjamin Harrison, March 4, 1889, to March 4, 1893
- Part 2: Grover Cleveland, March 4, 1893, to March 4, 1897

=== Volume ten X ===
- Part 1: Messages, Proclamations, Etc., Omitted From Volumes I to IX
- Part 2: William McKinley: Messages, Proclamations, and Executive Orders Relating to the Spanish–American War
1. Supplemental Volume:
- Part 1: William McKinley, March 4, 1897, to September 14, 1901: Additional Messages, Proclamations, Executive Orders, and Last Public Utterance to the People at Buffalo
- Part 2: Theodore Roosevelt: Messages, Proclamations, and Executive Orders to the End of the Fifty-seventh Congress, First Session
