= Elkhart Independent School District =

School district in Texas, United States

Location
- Elkhart, Texas ESC Region 7 USA

District information
- Type: Public Independent school district
- Motto: Academic Excellence Through Innovative Instruction
- Grades: EE through 12
- Superintendent: John Reese Briggs
- Schools: 4
- NCES District ID: 4818390

Students and staff
- Students: 1,197 (2023–2024)
- Teachers: 92.92 (on an FTE basis) (2023–2024)
- Staff: 81.29 (on an FTE basis) (2023–2024)
- Student–teacher ratio: 12.88 (2023–2024)

Other information
- Website: www.elkhartisd.org

Elkhart Independent School District is a public school district based in Elkhart, Texas,United States. The district is located in southwest Anderson County and extends into northern Houston County. A small portion of the district extends to the city of Palestine.

In 2023, the girls' powerlifting team won the 3A Div 2 state championships under the leadership of Mr. Ricardo Rodriguez and Mrs. Melissa Rodriguez. These coaches are known for their two state championships and a national championship.

In 2009, the school district was rated "academically acceptable" by the Texas Education Agency.

The district superintendent is Dr. Lamont Smith, who was selected to lead the district in 2018. The school was founded on March 8, 1888, and served as a coeducational school

== Schools ==
Elkhart ISD has five schools:

- Elkhart High School (grades 9-12)
- Elkhart Middle School (grades 6-8)
- Elkhart Intermediate School (grades 3-5)
- Elkhart Elementary School (early childhood education- grade 2)
- Elkhart DAEP (kindergarten-grade 12)
