= South Kentucky College =

College in Kentucky, USA

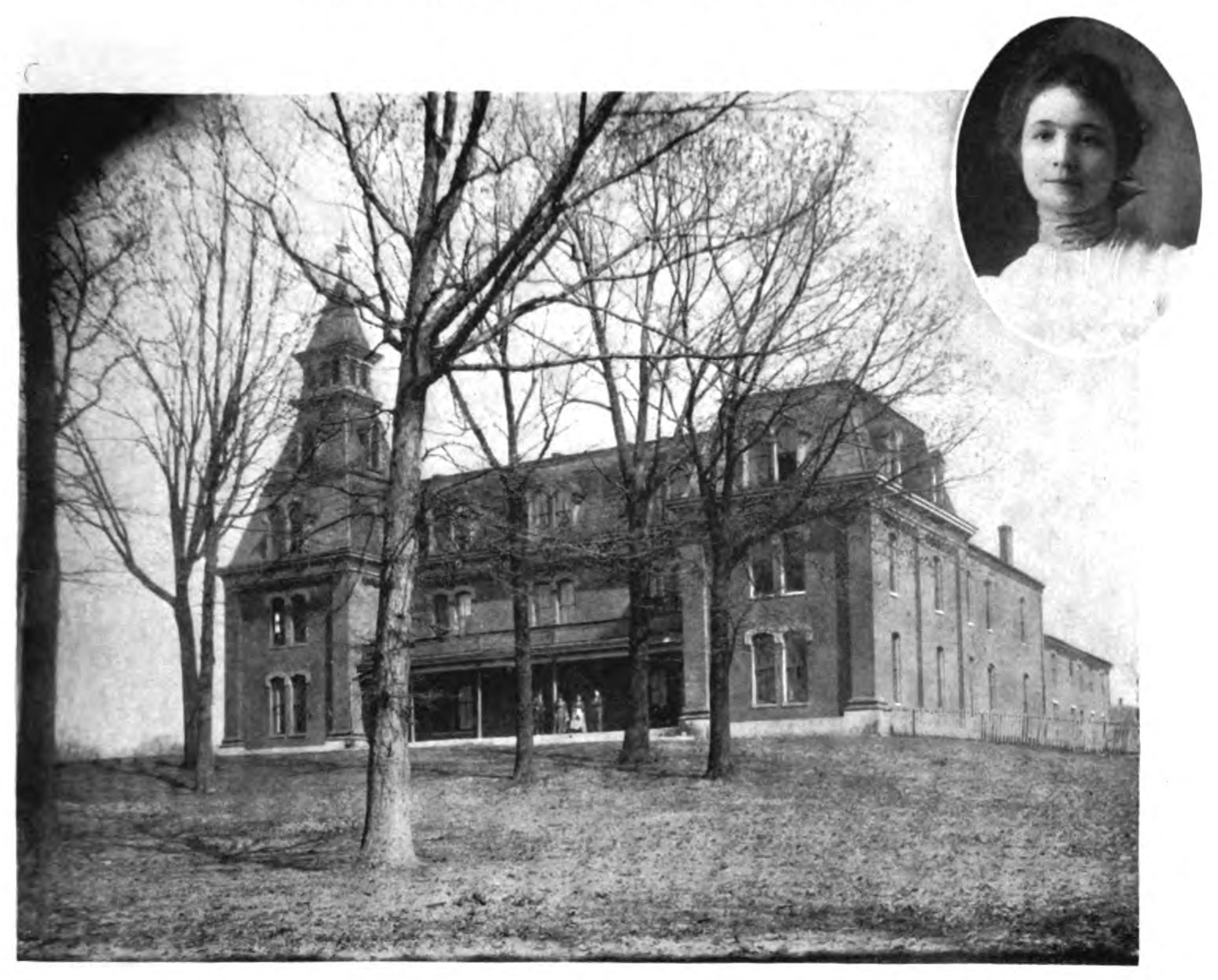
- South Kentucky College (1879), right corner features teacher Sophia H. Schooler
- Belmont Hill, Hopkinsville, Kentucky, U.S.

Information
- Established: 1849
- Closed: 1914

South Kentucky College, originally South Kentucky Institute and later renamed McLean College, was a finishing school for girls founded in 1849 that became a co-educational college before closing by 1914, located in Belmont Hill in Hopkinsville, Kentucky. It was the second all-female institution of higher learning in the state, after the Kentucky Female Orphan School (now Midway University).

== History ==
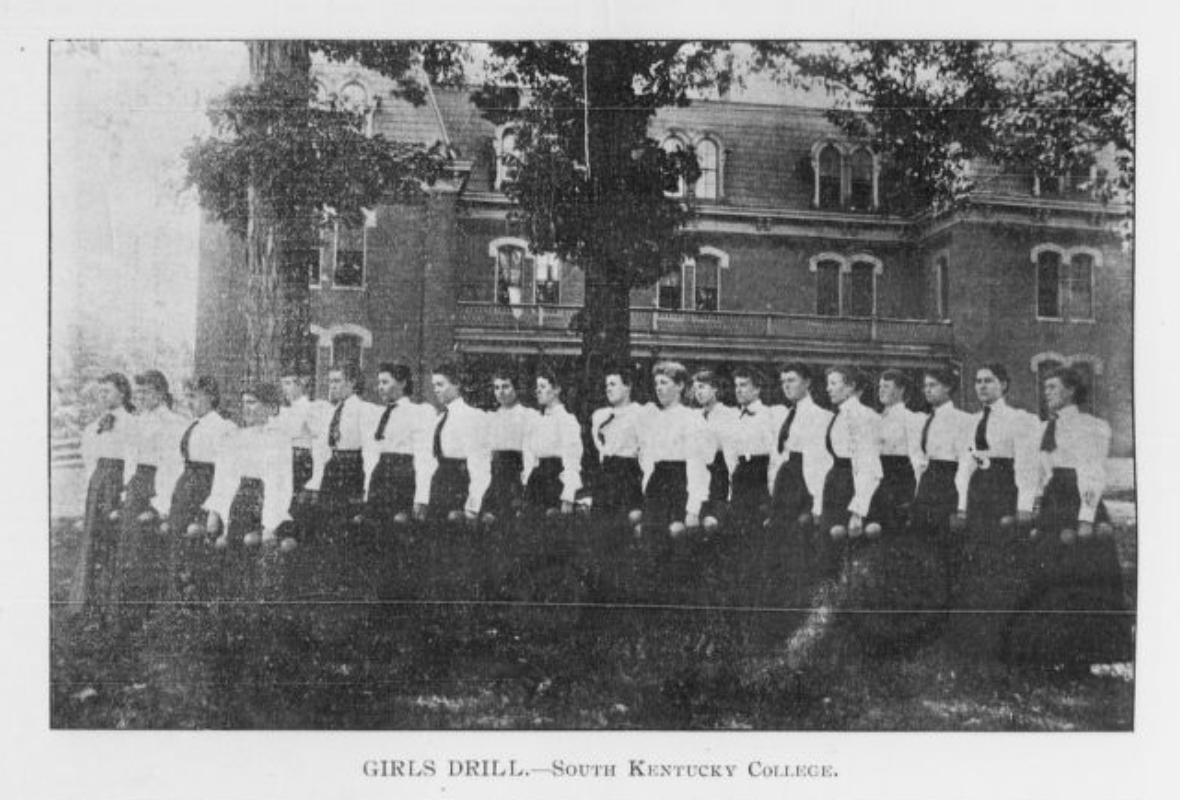
"Girls Drill", South Kentucky College (1897)

The South Kentucky Institute received its charter from the state legislature in February 1849, under the leadership of nine trustees. All of the trustees at the time of founding were affiliated with the Christian Church, also known as the Church of the Disciples. John M. Barnes served as the first president. The school was established in Hopkinsville, Kentucky in autumn 1849 as a finishing school for girls, located in the basement of the Christian Church in downtown. After the death of president Barnes in 1851, the second president of the school was Enos Campbell. In 1858, South Kentucky College built its first campus, designed by architect Nathan Kelley. By 1879, the school instruction included vocal, music, elocution, and physical education. The school began admitting men in 1880 and was officially renamed South Kentucky College by the state. From 1884 to 1891, James Edward Scobey served as president of the school.

In 1908, the school was renamed to McLean College, in honor of the missionary Archibald McLean. A 1912 fire destroyed the school, and the rebuilding effort extinguished its finances. In 1913, the campus was plagued with typhoid. The school was acquired by Transylvania University in January 1914. Transylvania University subdivided the school's land and sold it as housing lots. In 1949, the school campus property was bought by the city school system and opened as Belmont Elementary School.

Sophia H. Schooler taught elocution and physical culture at the school. Elizabeth M. Herman headed the music department.

== Legacy ==
The Kentucky Department of Libraries and Archives at the Kentucky State Archives hold records of the school. A postcard of the college exists in the Special Collections, at Western Kentucky University.

== Alumni ==
- Logan Feland

== See also ==
- Hopkinsville High School
