= Two-Seed-in-the-Spirit Predestinarian Baptists =

Christian denomination in the United States

Two-Seed-in-the-Spirit Predestinarian Baptists are part of a larger sub-group of Baptists that is commonly referred to as "anti-mission" Baptists. This sub-group includes the Duck River and Kindred Baptists, Old Regular Baptists, some Regular Baptists and some United Baptists. Only a minuscule minority of Primitive Baptists adhere to the Two-Seed doctrine. The primary centers of Two-Seedism were in Northern Alabama, Arkansas, Eastern Tennessee, Florida, Georgia, Illinois, Indiana, and Texas. As of 2002, five churches or congregations of this faith and order still existed in Alabama, Indiana, Tennessee, and Texas.

== Origins ==
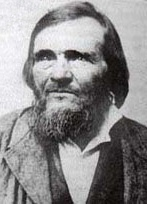
Elder Daniel Parker

Baptists first appeared in North America in the early 17th century. Through the influence of the Philadelphia Baptist Association (org. 1707), the influx of members to the churches from the Great Awakenings, and the union of the disparate Regular and Separate Baptists, by the early 19th century Baptists would become an important American denomination. This growth was not without its pangs, and by 1820 these Baptists were embroiled in an intense and sometimes bitter "missions" controversy. Much of the controversy centered around the newly formed Baptist Board of Foreign Missions.

Elder Daniel Parker (1781–1844) was one of the earlier ministers to speak out against the "missions" movement. In 1820, he released a booklet entitled "A Public Address to the Baptist Society, and Friends of Religion in General, on the Principle and Practice of the Baptist Board of Foreign Missions for the United States of America." The Baptist Board of Foreign Missions, organized at Philadelphia in 1814, is best known as the Triennial Convention, but its official name was the "General Missionary Convention of the Baptist Denomination in the United States." Objections by Baptists to the Convention were based on both soteriology and ecclesiology. Parker was a strict predestinarian, but his chief objections in the booklet are based on ecclesiology - for example, "They have violated the right or government of the Church of Christ in forming themselves into a body and acting without of the union." Several important preachers on the east coast led in the "anti-missions" movement, but Elder Parker was the leader on the frontier, and probably spoke best to the common man.

It appears that during this time, Parker was also formulating views on God and man that he would first release in his Views on the Two Seeds (1826). Parker taught that all persons are either of the "good seed" of God or of the "bad seed" of Satan (the children of the good seed are roughly equivalent to the "elect" of Calvinism, and those of the bad seed similar to the "non-elect"), and were predestined that way from the beginning. Therefore mission activity was not only unbiblical, but as a practical matter useless, since the "decision" was already made prior to birth.

It seems that Parker spread his "two seeds" far and wide, and a goodly number of the "anti-missions" movement accepted his doctrine, though it never achieved anything near majority status. In 1834, Daniel Parker and others migrated to the Texas frontier. Texas was still part of Mexico and the government would not allow organization of Protestant (non-Catholic) churches in the region. Elder Parker determined to organize a church before he arrived in Texas. The Pilgrim Predestinarian Regular Baptist Church was constituted July 26, 1833 in Illinois. It still exists today, near Elkhart, Texas, though as "Primitive" rather than "Two-Seed." Daniel Parker's name is almost synonymous with "anti-missions", but he was one of the important frontier preachers in Texas, leading in the organization of about nine churches in the eastern part of the state.

After the "missionary" and "anti-missionary" controversy brought division among Baptists, the "anti-missionaries" were called by names such as Old School, Old Regular, Predestinarian, and Primitive (as well as the pejorative "hardshells"). The Two-Seed churches were often connected with the Primitive Baptists and seem to have been so until late in the 19th century. By that time, most Primitive Baptists had excluded the "Two-Seeders" for holding heretical doctrines. However, in southern Georgia, at least, according to historian John G. Crowley, one may still find Two-Seed doctrines expounded by Primitive Baptists "if one knows where to go and what to listen for." Though they hold much in common with Primitive Baptists and often are so identified by outsiders, the Two-Seed churches do not consider themselves Primitive Baptists.

== Following Parker's death ==
The Two-Seed theological stance is known in some circles as Hyper-Calvinism, i.e., only evangelize to those who can be discerned as being members of the elect. This group is extremely conservative. As one observer noted, "'Innovations' have never touched these people." In 1845, shortly after Parker's death, this group experienced its first major schism. Central Kentucky's Elder Thomas P. Dudley, a member of a church of the Licking Creek Association, produced a work on "Two Souls" to supplement Parker's on the two seeds.

Baptism is by immersion. The only other ordinance this group practices is the Lord's Supper with foot washing. One commentator stated that this group was "so Calvinistic that they would exclude John Calvin himself."

The 1906 Census of Religious Bodies, there were nineteen churches in Tennessee, ten in Arkansas, nine in Kentucky, five in Georgia, four in Indiana, three in Florida, two each in Alabama and Texas, and one in Missouri with a total membership of 781. The Bear Creek, Bethlehem, Caney Fork, Drakes Creek, Elm Fork, Lookout Mountain, Pilgrims Rest, Richland Creek, and Suwannee River associations were affiliated with this movement. The New Hope Predestinarian Baptist Association of Illinois existed in 1877, but, was evidently extinct by 1906.

In 1936, this body reported two churches in urban settings and fourteen in rural areas. The membership stood at 201. One of the urban churches (in Alabama) had 57 members and was certainly the largest single congregation. Local churches existed in Alabama, Tennessee, and Kentucky. Previously churches existed in Arkansas, Florida, Georgia, Illinois, and Missouri. Three associations were also enumerated: Caney Fork, Drakes Creek, and Richland Creek. In 1916, there had been nine associations. For some reason, the congregations in Texas and Indiana are not included in the 1936 report (they were still in existence) although they had been listed in 1906 and 1916. Likewise, the Eel River Association, which folded in 1941, is omitted. Therefore, the figure of 201 adherents in 1936 is lower than it should have been.

== Current ==
Remnants of Two-Seed doctrine can still be heard among a few Primitive Baptists. In 2003, there appeared to be four remaining churches of the Two-Seed-in-the-Spirit Predestinarian Baptists (two in Texas, and one each in Indiana and Tennessee) with approximately 80 members. Two of the churches participate together in the Trinity River Association, and two are independent.

Baptist historian Albert W. Wardin Jr. reported the following statistics in an article published in the June 22, 2002, issue of Baptist History and Heritage:

The U.S. religious census of 1906 recorded 781 members with 279 in Tennessee in nineteen churches, the most in any state. Thirty years later, Tennessee had ninety-eight members in nine churches. Today, nationwide there are only five congregations left. Two are members of the Trinity River Association which includes the Little Hope Church near Jacksboro, Texas, and the Otter Creek Church in Putnam County, Indiana, with a total membership in 2001 of forty members. The Little Hope Church split in the 1940s, and the division meets in a home near Bryson, Texas. Another congregation, Mt. Moriah in Limestone County, Alabama, has only three members, existing practically in name only. The fourth congregation is the Concord Church in the Highland District near McMinnville, Tennessee, with ten members and an average attendance each Sunday from twelve to fifteen. Like other Primitive Baptists, it has no Sunday school and uses no musical instruments in worship. The Lord's Supper is observed annually with foot washing. Wine is used in the supper. It belongs to no association.

In 2011, Valdosta State University announced that Dr. John G. Crowley, an assistant professor of history there, was writing the first comprehensive history of the Two-Seed movement.

== Cultural references ==
In his 1945 supplement to The American Language, H. L. Mencken singled out the Two-Seed-in-the-Spirit Predestinarian Baptist Church as an example of the proliferation of "dissenting" Christian denominations in the United States.

American novelist Kurt Vonnegut Jr. refers to the sect in his early novel God Bless You, Mr. Rosewater (1965), when the title character claims that he is a member.

== Sources cited ==
- Carroll, Ref. H. K., D.D. "Greetings." in The Baptist World Alliance Second Congress Philadelphia, June 19–25, 1911. Record of Proceedings Published under the Auspices of the Philadelphia Committee. Philadelphia, PA: Harper and Brothers Company, 1911, p. 185-188.
- Clark, Elmer Talmadge. The Small Sects in America. Nashville, TN: Cokesbury Press, 1937.
- Crowley, John G. Primitive Baptists of the Wiregrass South: 1815 to the Present. Gainesville, FL: University Press of Florida, 1999. Hardcover ISBN 978-0-8130-1640-5 Paperback ISBN 978-0-8130-4468-2
- Evans, M. G. "Immersionists and Church Union" in Twenty-ninth Annual Session of the Baptist Congress Held in the First Baptist Church, At Atlantic City, N. J.—November 14, 15, and 16, 1911. Chicago, IL: University of Chicago Press, pp. 137–141.
- "Crowley Studies Rare Religion". Tuesday, June 7, 2011.
- Miller, Terry E. "Voices from the Past: The Singing and Preaching at Otter Creek Church." The Journal of American Folklore, Vol. 88, No. 349 (July-Sept. 1975), pp. 266–282.
- Sparks, Elder John. The Roots of Appalachian Christianity: The Life and Legacy of Elder Shubal Stearns. Lexington, KY: University Press of Kentucky, 2001.
- "Two-Seed-in-the-Spirit Predestinarian Baptists". in United States Department of Commerce and Labor. Bureau of the Census. E. Dana Durand, Director. Special Report—Religious Bodies, 1906: Part II Separate Denominations: History, Description, and Statistics. Washington, DC: Government Printing Office, 1910, Vol. 2, pp. 155–157.
- "Two-Seed-in-the-Spirit Predestinarian Baptists". in United States Department of Commerce. Bureau of the Census. Dr. T. H. Murphy, Supervisor. Religious Bodies, 1936: Volume II Part 1 Denominations A to J: Statistics, History, Doctrine Organization and Work. Washington, DC: Government Printing Office, 1941, Vol. 2, Part 1 pp. 234–236.
- Wardin, Albert W., Jr. ″Two-Seed-in-the-Spirit Predestinarian Baptists: a Small Baptist Body.″ Baptist History and Heritage. June 22, 2002

== Denominational overviews ==
- Clark, Elmer Talmadge. The Small Sects in America. Nashville, TN: Cokesbury Press, 1937, pp. 248–249.
- ———. "Two-Seed-in-the-Spirit Predestinarian Baptists" in The Small Sects in America. Revised edition. New York, NY: Abingdon-Cokesbury Press, 1949, pp. 203–204.
- May, Lynn E., Jr. "Two-Seed-in-the-Spirit Predestinarian Baptists." in Encyclopedia of Southern Baptists. Nashville, TN: Broadman Press, 1958, Vol. 2, p. 1433.
- Mayer, Frederick Emanuel. "Two-Seed-in-the-Spirit Predestinarian Baptists." in The Religious Bodies of America. St. Louis, MO: Concordia Publishing House, 1954, p. 271, col. 1.
- Mead, Frank S., rev. by Samuel S. Hill. Handbook of Denominations in the United States. 8th ed. Nashville, TN: Abingdon Press, 1985, p. 57.
- "The Old Two-Seed-in-the-Spirit Predestinarian Baptists". in United States Department of Commerce and Labor. Bureau of the Census. The Census Bulletin. Issue No. No. 375, May 12, 1893: Statistics of Churches. Washington, DC: Government Printing Office, 1893, pp. 38–41.
- "Two-Seed-in-the-Spirit Predestinarian Baptists". in United States Department of Commerce and Labor. Bureau of the Census. E. Dana Durand, Director. Special Report—Religious Bodies, 1906: Part II Separate Denominations: History, Description, and Statistics. Washington, DC: Government Printing Office, 1910, Vol. 2, pp. 155–157.
- "Two-Seed-in-the-Spirit Predestinarian Baptists". in United States Department of Commerce. Bureau of the Census. Rogers, Sam. L., Director. Religious Bodies, 1916: Part II Separate Denominations: History, Description, and Statistics. Washington, DC: Government Printing Office, 1919, pp. 150–152.
- "Two-Seed-in-the-Spirit Predestinarian Baptists". in United States Department of Commerce. Bureau of the Census. Murphy, Dr. T. H., Supervisor. Religious Bodies, 1936: Volume II Part 1 Denominations A to J: Statistics, History, Doctrine Organization and Work. Washington, DC: Government Printing Office, 1941, Vol. 2, Part 1 pp. 234–238.
- "Two-Seed-in-the-Spirit Predestinarian Baptists". in Watson, E. O., ed. Year Book of the Churches 1921-22. Washington, DC: Hayworth Publishing Company, 1922, pp. 40–41.
