= Elkhart, Texas =

- Town
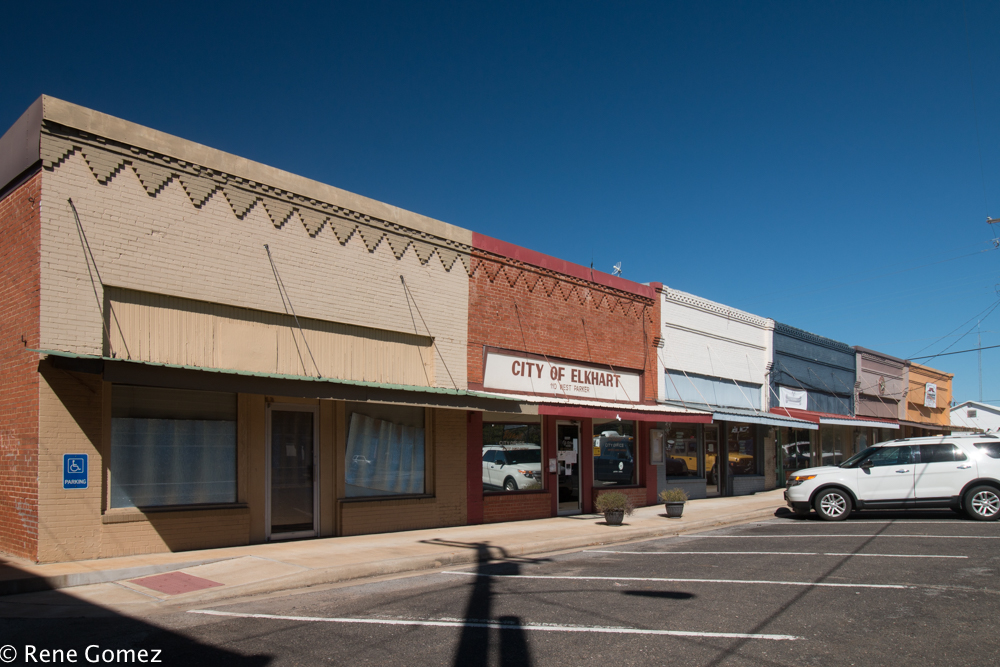
- Downtown Elkhart

- Logo

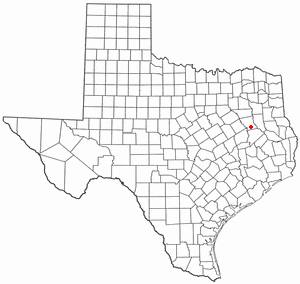
- Location of Elkhart, Texas

- Coordinates: 31°37′30″N 95°34′46″W
- Country: United States
- State: Texas
- County: Anderson

Government
  - Type: Type A Mayor & Council

Area
  - Total: 1.54 sq mi (3.99 km^{2})
  - Land: 1.54 sq mi (3.99 km^{2})
  - Water: 0 sq mi (0.00 km^{2})
- Elevation: 407 ft (124 m)

Population (2020)
  - Total: 1,287
  - Density: 843.4/sq mi (325.65/km^{2})
- Time zone: UTC-6 (Central (CST))
  - Summer (DST): UTC-5 (CDT)
- ZIP code: 75839
- Area codes: 903, 430
- FIPS code: 48-23140
- GNIS feature ID: 2412476
- Website: www.cityofelkharttx.gov

Elkhart is a town in the U.S. state of Texas, in Anderson County. Elkhart's population was estimated at 1,250 in March 2024.

== History ==
Elkhart's early history includes Daniel Parker's Pilgrim Predestinarian Baptist Church, formed in Crawford County, Illinois, in 1833, because the government of Mexico would not allow the Baptist church's organization within their borders. Daniel and his father, John Parker, led their congregation to Texas, settling in Austin's Colony in 1834. While John Parker's group settled and established Fort Parker (Limestone County), Daniel's group settled first in the territory that became Grimes County and later moved to the area around Fort Houston (Anderson County). Daniel Parker spent his time traveling and preaching in the homes of his scattered congregation. In 1836, the threats of General Santa Anna's troops in April 1836 and the attack of Fort Parker in May 1836 sent the remnant of John Parker's group to seek protection near Fort Houston. The Pilgrim Church resumed meetings in February 1837, and resolved in 1839 to build a church house, selecting 2.5 acres "on the north side of the bluff of the Harrison Fork of Bayou Blue near Daniel Parker's house". They constructed a log house and cleared a burial ground, where Daniel Parker was buried in 1844. The church, now called Old Pilgrim Church, which has been replaced several times since the first log house, was the center of the community called Parker's Settlement, or just Pilgrim.

About the same time Parker's followers were getting established, the first Methodist sermon was given by Rev. William Stevenson, whose members built their church about 1840, one mile west of Pilgrim Baptist Church.

The community was granted a post office in March 1850, named Elkheart (later changed to Elkhart), which was located 4 miles south of Elkhart's current location and named for a Native who had helped the early settlers.

As the Houston to Palestine rail was being finished in 1872, Elkhart shifted north to the train depot, thus it began to be considered the "railroad village" associated with the Parker settlement.

== Geography ==
Elkhart is located in southern Anderson County. U.S. Route 287 passes through the town, leading north 10 miles (16 km) to Palestine, the county seat, 12 miles (19 km) south to Grapeland, and 25 miles (40 km) south to Crockett, the seat of Houston County. According to the United States Census Bureau, the town has a total area of 1.5 square miles (3.9 km^{2}), all land.

== Demographics ==
Historical population
Census	Pop.	Note	%±
1940	751		—
1950	776		3.3%
1960	780		0.5%
1970	997		27.8%
1980	1,317		32.1%
1990	1,076		−18.3%
2000	1,215		12.9%
2010	1,371		12.8%
2020	1,287		−6.1%
U.S. Decennial Census

Elkhart racial composition as of 2020 (NH = Non-Hispanic) (Note: Note: the US Census treats Hispanic/Latino as an ethnic category. This table excludes Latinos from the racial categories and assigns them to a separate category. Hispanics/Latinos can be of any race.)
Race	Number	Percentage
White (NH)	969	75.29%
Black or African American (NH)	125	9.71%
Native American or Alaska Native (NH)	5	0.39%
Asian (NH)	6	0.47%
Pacific Islander (NH)	2	0.16%
Some Other Race (NH)	9	0.7%
Multiracial (NH)	44	3.42%
Hispanic or Latino	127	9.87%
Total	1,287	

As of the 2020 United States census, 1,287 people, 453 households, and 316 families were residing in the town.

At the census of 2000, 1,215 people, 473 households, and 321 families lived in the town. The population density was 783.0 inhabitants per square mile (302.3/km^{2}). The 532 housing units had an average density of 342.8 units per square mile (132.4 units/km^{2}). The racial makeup of the town was 89.05% White, 8.15% African American, 0.41% Native American, 0.82% from other races, and 1.56% from two or more races. Hispanics or Latinos of any race were 3.05% of the population. Among the population in 2020, its racial and ethnic makeup remained predominantly non-Hispanic White, though Black or African Americans were the second-largest group.

The median income in the town for a household was $25,927 and for a family was $33,977 in 2000. Males had a median income of $27,841 versus $21,705 for females. The per capita income for the town was $13,809. About 12.9% of families and 20.0% of the population were below the poverty line, including 24.1% of those under 18 and 32.5% of those 65 or over. In 2020, the median household income was $37,159, and 19.9% of its population lived at or below the poverty line.

== Education ==
The town of Elkhart is served by the Elkhart Independent School District.

== Notable people ==
- F. Tillman Durdin, journalist
- Tye Sheridan, actor
- Jeff Wilson, NFL running back for the Miami Dolphins
