= Tolbert Fanning =

- Tolbert Fanning
- Born: May 10, 1810; Cannon County, Tennessee
- Died: May 3, 1874 (aged 63); Nashville, Tennessee
- Occupation(s): Restoration Movement preacher, writer, educator
- Spouse: Charlotte Fall

Tolbert Fanning (May 10, 1810 – May 3, 1874) was one of the most influential leaders of what came to be called the American Restoration Movement. Born in what would later become Cannon County, Tennessee. He was man of many talents in both religion and agriculture: preacher, college founder and professor, journalist, writer, and editor. For his era he was considered an innovative farmer writing and co-editing magazines, Agriculturalist from 1840-1845 and The Naturalist from 1846-1850. His greatest influence was as much from his successful publications The Christian Review and Gospel Advocate, as much as from his circuit preaching. The most influential publication he founded, Gospel Advocate, inspired a former Franklin college student, David Lipscomb, who would follow Fanning as its editor. Fanning’s magazine provided a platform for purveying views and opinions relating to doctrine and church practice. It was through this influence that led to the 1906 identification of the Church of Christ as a distinct religious body, 33 years after Fanning's death.

== Early life ==
As a boy Fanning lived on the plantations of Alabama and moved to Nashville, Tennessee to attend the former University of Nashville.

== Contributions to Restoration Movement ==
Fanning is said to have converted under the influence of preachers Ephraim D. Moore and James E. Matthews. He was baptised a member of the church in response to a sermon preached by Matthews seven miles north of Florence, Alabama, around October 1, 1827.

Fanning soon after his arrival in Nashville became one of the recognized leaders of the Restoration Movement, an attempt to purge the Christian religion of its many denominations and restore it to the original doctrines and practices of the church in the 1st century.

Fanning founded a girls' school in Franklin, Tennessee in 1837, the year of his graduation from Nashville University. He founded Franklin College in 1840, notable alumni of which include David Lipscomb, T. B. Larimore, E. G. Sewell, Edward Ward Carmack, J. E. Scobey, Samuel R. Lowery. and William Lipscomb. He was president of the college until 1861.

Along with the Gospel Advocate, Tolbert Fanning was also the editor of The Religious Historian published from 1872 until his death in 1874.

== Legacy ==
Fanning's major legacy within the Restoration Movement lay with his advocacy of education. He was an important mentor to David Lipscomb and thought by many to be the source of many his protégé's more pacifist views. ‘Letter to President of the Confederacy.’ “Gospel Advocate, 8:417-418, July 3, 1866.” Lipscomb University has a dormitory named in honor of him.

Following the American Civil War, Fanning was instrumental in resisting the missionary societies and the use of instrumental music, issues which would eventually lead to the schism, recognized by the U.S. Census in 1906, in which the Church of Christ was first recognized as a separate body from the more liberal Disciples of Christ.

== Books ==
- "The True Method of Searching the Scriptures" by Tolbert Fanning. 67 pages. Cobb Publishing, McLoud, Oklahoma, 2016
- The Hazard of the Die: Tolbert Fanning and the Restoration Movement by James R. Wilburn. 288 pages with index. Sweet Publishing Company, Austin, Texas, 1969
- Tolbert Fanning vs. Robert Richardson: battling for the birthrights of the "People of the Book" by Darren Ross Johnson. 1999.

Preceded by none	Editor of the Gospel Advocate; 1855–1866? With: William Lipscomb 1855–1861	Succeeded by David Lipscomb
