= William Lipscomb (clergyman) =

American minister of the Restoration Movement

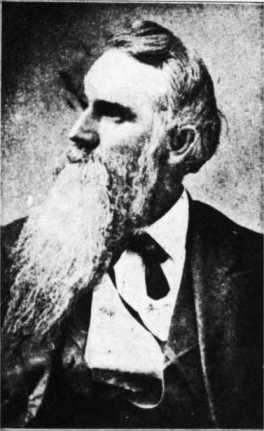
- Born: July 20, 1829; Franklin County, Tennessee, U.S.
- Died: 1908 (aged 78–79)
- Resting place: Mount Olivet Cemetery; Nashville, Tennessee, U.S.
- Occupation: Led the American Restoration Movement

William Lipscomb (July 20, 1829 – 1908) was a figure of the American Restoration Movement and co-editor of the Gospel Advocate.

== Life ==
Lipscomb was born in Franklin County, Tennessee.

The Gospel Advocate was founded by Nashville-area Restoration Movement preacher Tolbert Fanning in 1855. William Lipscomb, who was a student of Fanning, served as co-editor until the American Civil War forced them to suspend publication in 1861. After the end of the Civil War, publication resumed in 1866 under the editorship of Fanning and William Lipscomb's younger brother David Lipscomb; Fanning soon retired and David Lipscomb became the sole editor.

Lipscomb is buried in Mount Olivet Cemetery in Nashville, Tennessee.
