= Elmer Talmage Clark =

American writer, editor and denominational executive

Elmer Talmadge Clark (September 9, 1886 in Arkansas – August 29, 1966) was an American writer, editor and denominational executive for the Methodist Church and supporting groups related to the Methodist Church. Most of his writings are interpretative of the religion and promotional booklets.

== Education ==
He attended Hendrix College and Birmingham–Southern College, which awarded him a B.A. degree. He received an M.A. from George Peabody College for Teachers, then attended Temple University where he earned a B.D. and Th.D. He was later awarded honorary degrees by Florida Southern College (LL.D.) and Southwestern University (Litt.D.)

== Career ==
Clark served the Methodist Episcopal Church, South (MECS) and the Methodist Church for a total of 58 years until his retirement in 1952. He worked for the St. Louis Conference and at denominational headquarters in Nashville, Tennessee and New York City. He was a historian of the denomination, serving as leader of the Association of Methodist Historical Societies for two decades, and was a prolific writer of books and tracts. From 1939 until 1952 he served as editor of World Outlook (now New World Outlook).

He was a frequent correspondent of Duke University President William Preston Few. The Elmer T. Clark Papers were received by the Duke University Archives as a transfer in 1973, 1986.

== Bibliography ==
This is only a few of the many titles Elmer T. Clark wrote and published:

Social Studies of the War 1919, (reprint from Kessinger Publishing 2010)

The Chiangs of China New York : Abingdon-Cokesbury Press; 1st Edition 1943 (ASIN: B0006AQ7CE Amazon Standard Identification Number)

Healing Ourselves: The First Task Of The Church In America Cokesbury Press 1924 (Reprint: Kessinger Publishing 2010)

The Small Sects in America. Nashville, TN: Cokesbury Press, 1937.

The Small Sects in America. Revised edition. New York, NY: Abingdon-Cokesbury Press, 1949.

The Small Sects in America – Originally published in 1937. Reprint date: 7/1/1999 DIANE Publishing Company.
