= James E. Scobey =

American educator (1834–1923)

James Edward Scobey
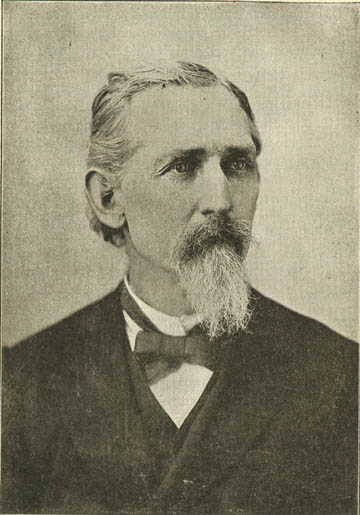
- Portrait of James Edward Scobey (1897)
- Born: January 3, 1834; Lebanon, Tennessee, U.S.
- Died: July 6, 1923 (aged 89); Nashville, Tennessee, U.S.
- Education: Franklin College

James Edward Scobey (January 3, 1834 - July 6, 1923) was an American educator who led several schools in the United States.

== Early life and career ==
Scobey was born in Lebanon, Wilson County, Tennessee on January 3, 1834. He studied at Franklin College on the outskirts of Nashville, Tennessee. He began his teaching career in 1855 in his home county. He taught for five years at Union Academy, six miles east of Lebanon. He opened a school on the turnpike between Lebanon and Nashville in February 1867. He dubbed his establishment "Oakland School," and he taught here until 1872.

In 1872, Scobey joined Murfreesboro Female Institute, also known as the Scobey School. He remained employed by this educational establishment until 1884. Later in 1884, he became the president at South Kentucky College in Hopkinsville, Kentucky. In 1891, Scobey moved to Franklin, Tennessee and started working for Williamson County.

== Personal life ==
He married and had several children, some of whom followed him into the teaching profession. After his first wife's death, he married again.

Teacher and state legislator Edward Sweatt was his maternal grandfather.

== Death ==
Scobey died of old age on July 6, 1923. He is buried in the Mount Olivet Cemetery (Nashville).

== Publications ==
- Franklin College and Its Influences
