= Daniel Parker (Baptist) =

American leader in the Primitive Baptist Church

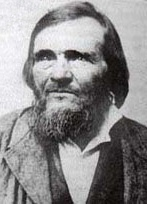
- Title: Elder

Personal life
- Born: April 6, 1781 Culpeper County, Virginia
- Died: December 3, 1844 (aged 63) Elkhart, Texas
- Resting place: Pilgrim Cemetery, Elkhart, Texas
- Spouse: Martha "Patsy" Dixon (m. 1802)
- Children: 11
- Parents: John Parker (father); Sarah Parker (mother)

Religious life
- Religion: Protestantism
- Denomination: Baptist
- Church: Turnbull Baptist Church; Pilgrim Predestinarian Regular Baptist Church
- Philosophy: Predestination, Serpent seed
- Sect: Primitive Baptist; Two-Seed-in-the-Spirit Predestinarian Baptists
- Initiation: Baptized; January 19, 1802

Member of the Illinois Senate from the Crawford County district
- In office December 2, 1822 – December 4, 1826
- Preceded by: Joseph Kitchell
- Succeeded by: William Beatty Archer

Daniel Parker (April 6, 1781 – December 3, 1844) was an American minister in the Primitive Baptist Church in the Southern United States and the founder of numerous churches including Pilgrim Primitive Baptist Church at Elkhart, Texas, the location of the Parker family cemetery. As an elder, Parker led a group who separated from that church and formed the Two-Seed-in-the-Spirit Predestinarian Baptists. Parker is one of the earliest documented proponents of the doctrine of Serpent Seed among Protestant Christianity.

== Early life ==
Daniel Parker was born on April 6, 1781, in Culpeper County, Virginia. He was the oldest son of John Parker, a former Continental soldier, and Sarah (White) Parker. The family moved to Elbert County, Georgia around 1785. Daniel professed conversion before the Nail's Creek Baptist Church in Franklin County, Georgia, and was baptized on January 19, 1802. He married Patsy Dixon on March 11, 1802. In 1803, John & Sarah, Daniel & Patsy, and other Parker family members moved to Dickson County, Tennessee. Before the Parkers moved to Tennessee, the Nail's Creek church had licensed Daniel to the ministry. In August 1803, Daniel and Patsy settled on Turnbull Creek. The Turnbull Baptist Church was organized by fourteen members (mostly the Parker family) in the home of John Parker in April 1806. The Turnbull Church ordained Daniel Parker as a minister of the gospel on May 28, 1806. Daniel and Patsy moved to Crawford County, Illinois in December 1817, shortly before Illinois entered the Union.

Daniel Parker's son, Dickson (or Dickinson) Parker, was a veteran of the Battle of San Jacinto.

== Religious leadership ==
Elder Parker was one of the earlier ministers to speak out against the "missions" movement. In 1820, while living in Vincennes, Indiana, he released a booklet entitled "A Public Address to the Baptist Society, and Friends of Religion in General, on the Principle and Practice of the Baptist Board of Foreign Missions for the United States of America." The Baptist Board of Foreign Missions, organized at Philadelphia in 1814, is best known as the Triennial Convention, but its official name was the "General Missionary Convention of the Baptist Denomination in the United States." Objections by Baptists to the Convention were based on both soteriology and ecclesiology. He was a strict Predestinarian, but his chief objections in the booklet are based on ecclesiology – for example, "They have violated the right or government of the Church of Christ in forming themselves into a body and acting without of the union." Several important preachers on the east coast led in the "anti-missions" movement, but Parker was the leader on the frontier, and probably spoke best to the common man.

It appears that during this time, Parker was also formulating views on God and man that he would first release in his Views on the Two Seeds (1826). He taught that all persons are from the moment of conception either of the "good seed" of God or of the "bad seed" of Satan (the children of the good seed are roughly equivalent to the "elect" of Calvinism, and those of the bad seed similar to the "non-elect"), and were predestined that way from the beginning; nothing a person can do can change one from God's seed to Satan's or vice versa. Therefore, mission activity was not only unbiblical and sinful but, as a practical matter, useless since the "decision" was already made prior to birth. Many consider his theory a type of Manichaeism.

Parker's two-seeds doctrine identified the serpent as the father of Cain and the originator of a wicked impure seedline. That this was unrelated to race theory can be seen in the fact that the Pilgrim Church contained both whites and blacks in the membership. Parker may have incorporated the Serpent seedline doctrine into his opposition to foreign Christian missionary activity, but “an examination of Parker’s writings reveals, contrary to the traditional view, that Parker was not opposed to missions. Rather, he was opposed to any mission plan which was not under the government and direction of the churches, an example of which was the societal mission plan of the Triennial Convention. Parker’s opposition was against this plan of the Triennial Convention and not against missions proper.” Parker was labeled a heretic by the main body of Baptists for his teaching the two-seeds doctrine. The influences on Parker's beliefs are unknown, so he may have arrived at his version of the Serpent seedline doctrine independently. Parker's teachings coincided with the promotion of the earliest form of Polygenism in the United States by the Kentuckian Charles Caldwell, who believed non-white races could not have descended from Adam. Although it was not widely accepted, Parker's teaching became well known among Calvinistic Baptists in Kentucky. "Two-Seed Predestinarian Baptists always remained a small group. The U.S. religious census of 1906 recorded 781 members. In 1938 there were 98 members."

Parker's views on the "two seeds" were spread rapidly and became infamous among the Primitive Baptist churches. Many members of the "anti-missions" movement accepted his doctrine, though it never achieved anything near majority status. In 1834, he and many of his followers left the United States and migrated to the Texas frontier. Texas was still part of Mexico and the government would allow no organization of Protestant churches in the region. Parker determined to organize a church before he arrived in Texas. The Pilgrim Predestinarian Regular Baptist Church was constituted July 26, 1833, in Illinois. It still exists today, near Elkhart, Texas, though as "Primitive" rather than "Two-Seed." Daniel Parker's name is almost synonymous with "anti-missions", but he was one of the important frontier preachers in Texas, leading in the organization of about nine churches in the eastern part of the state.

== Death ==
He died December 3, 1844, at the age of 63 and was buried in the Pilgrim Cemetery in Elkhart, Texas; his wife Patsy survived him by less than two years and is buried with him.

== See also ==
- John Parker
- Fort Parker massacre
- Serpent Seed
