= Hamburg, Tennessee =

- Unincorporated community
- Location within Tennessee Location within the United States
- Coordinates: 35°05′41″N 88°18′15″W
- Country: United States
- State: Tennessee
- County: Hardin
- Elevation: 390 ft (120 m)
- Time zone: UTC-6 (Central (CST))
  - Summer (DST): UTC-5 (CDT)
- Area code: 731
- GNIS feature ID: 1286632

Hamburg is an unincorporated community in Hardin County, Tennessee. Hamburg is located on the west bank of the Tennessee River, south of Savannah.
