= James D. Richardson =

American politician and 1st lieutenant 45th Tennessee CSA (1843–1914)

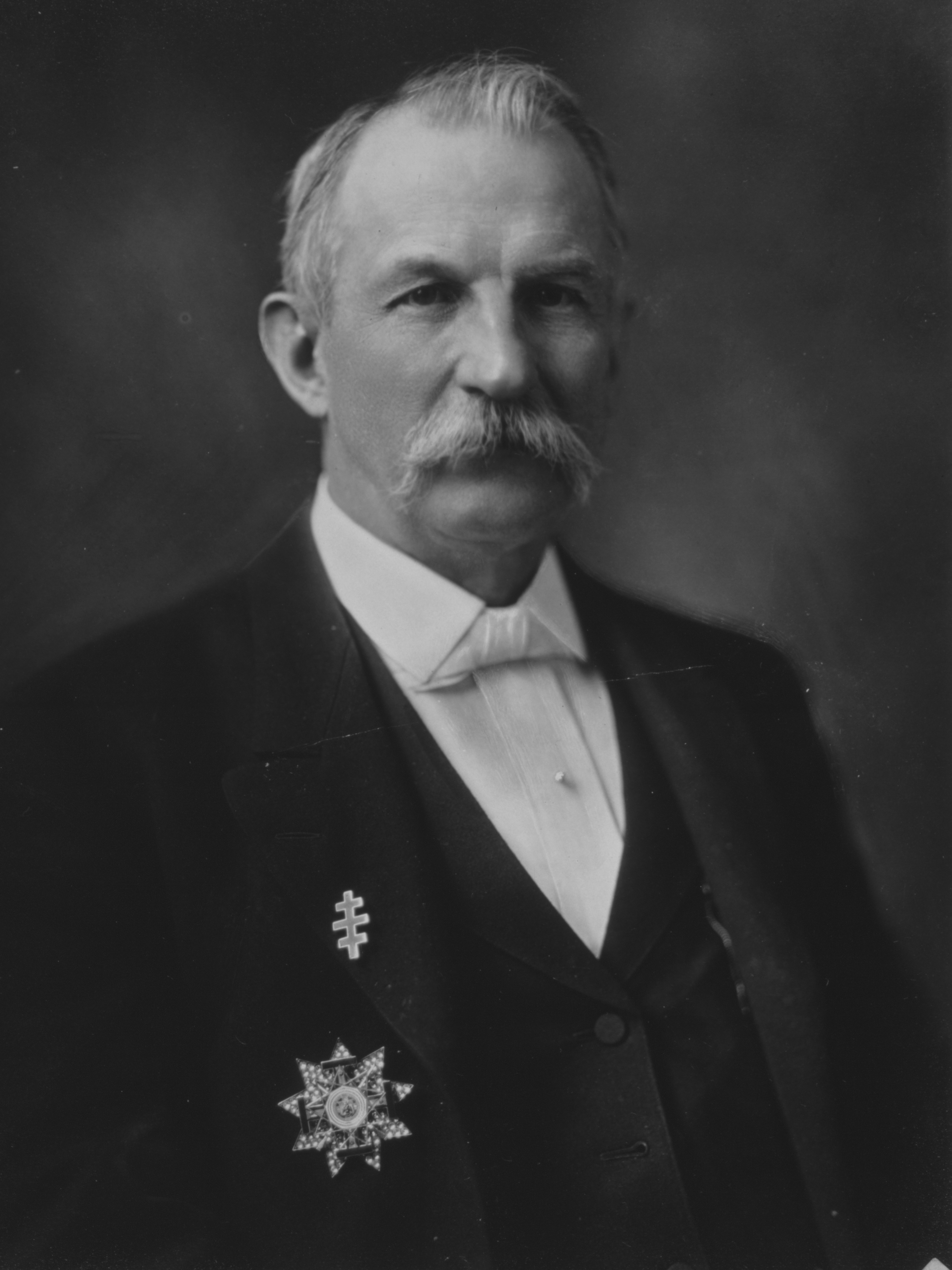
- Richardson in Masonic regalia, c. 1909

House Minority Leader
- In office March 4, 1899 – March 3, 1903
- Preceded by: Joseph Weldon Bailey
- Succeeded by: John Sharp Williams

Leader of the House Democratic Caucus
- In office March 4, 1899 – March 3, 1903
- Preceded by: Charles Frederick Crisp
- Succeeded by: John Sharp Williams

Chairman of the House Democratic Caucus
- In office March 4, 1897 – March 3, 1899
- Speaker: Thomas Brackett Reed
- Preceded by: David B. Culberson
- Succeeded by: James Hay

Member of the U.S. House of Representatives from Tennessee's 5th district
- In office March 4, 1885 – March 3, 1905
- Preceded by: Richard Warner
- Succeeded by: William C. Houston

Member of the Tennessee Senate
- In office 1873–1875

Member of the Tennessee House of Representatives
- In office 1871–1873

Personal details
- Born: March 10, 1843 Rutherford County, Tennessee
- Died: July 24, 1914 (aged 71) Murfreesboro, Tennessee
- Party: Democratic
- Spouse: Alabama Rebecca Pippen
- Children: 5
- Education: Franklin College

James Daniel Richardson (March 10, 1843 – July 24, 1914) was an American politician and a Democrat from Tennessee for Tennessee's 5th congressional district in the United States House of Representatives from 1885 through 1905. During the Civil War, he entered the Confederate Army before graduating from college and served nearly four years, the first year as a private and the remaining three years as adjutant of the Forty-fifth Regiment, Tennessee Infantry.

== Early life and education ==
James Daniel Richardson was born in Rutherford County, Tennessee, son of John Watkins and Augusta M. Starnes Richardson. He attended the country schools and Franklin College, near Nashville. He married Alabama Pippen on January 18, 1865, and they had five children, Annie Augusta, Ida Lee, James Daniel, Allie Sue, and John Watkins. Before graduating from college, Richardson enlisted in the Confederate States Army during the American Civil War, and served nearly four years. The first year he was a private and the remaining three years as a first lieutenant and the adjutant of the 45th Tennessee Infantry Regiment.

== Career ==
Richardson studied law; was admitted to the bar and commenced practice January 1, 1867, in Murfreesboro, Tennessee. He was elected to the Tennessee House of Representatives, serving from 1871 to 1873, and then to the Tennessee Senate, serving from 1873 to 1875. He was a delegate to the Democratic National Conventions in 1876, 1896, and 1900, and presided as permanent chairman at the 1900 convention.

Elected as a Democratic to the Forty-ninth and to the nine succeeding Congresses, Richardson served from March 4, 1885, to March 3, 1905. He was among the earliest U.S. House Minority Leaders, holding that position from 1899 to 1903, during the 56th and 57th United States Congresses.

Pursuant to an act of Congress on August 20, 1894, Richardson was charged with compiling the "Messages and Papers of the Presidents," a multi-volume work including every single important document from the federal Government, from the early days of President Washington through the second administration of Grover Cleveland, plus some papers from the administration of William McKinley.

== Death ==
Richardson died on July 24, 1914 (age 71 years, 136 days) in Murfreesboro, Tennessee. He is interred at Evergreen Cemetery.

== Personal life ==
James Richardson was a freemason and was raised in Mt. Moriah Lodge 18, in Murfreesboro, on October 12, 1867. He was elected the Grand Master of the Grand Lodge of Tennessee in 1873. He also became the eleventh Sovereign Grand Commander of the Scottish Rite's Supreme Council for the Southern Jurisdiction. He held this office from 1900 until his death until 1914.

Richardson was also the Provincial Grand Master of the Royal Order of Scotland from 1903 to 1914.

Masonic offices
Preceded by D. R. Grafton	Grand Master of the Grand Lodge of Tennessee; 1873	Succeeded by Andrew J. Wheeler
U.S. House of Representatives
Preceded by Richard Warner	Member of the U.S. House of Representatives from Tennessee's 5th congressional district 1885-1905	Succeeded by William C. Houston
Preceded by David B. Culberson	Democratic Caucus Chairman of the United States House of Representatives; 1897–1899	Succeeded by James Hay
Preceded by Joseph Weldon Bailey	Minority Leader of the United States House of Representatives; 1899–1903	Succeeded by John Sharp Williams
