= A Is for Atom =

1953 educational film directed by John Sutherland

- Directed by: Carl Urbano; Art Direction: Gerald Nevius; Lew Keller
- Written by: True Boardman
- Produced by: John Sutherland; George Gordon (Associate Producer)
- Narrated by: John (Bud) Hiestand
- Music by: Eugene Poddany
- Animation by: Arnold Gillespie; Emery Hawkins
- Backgrounds by: Tony Rivera (Production Design)
- Distributed by: John Sutherland Productions
- Release date: July 2, 1953
- Running time: 14:45 min:sec
- Country: United States
- Language: English

A Is for Atom (1953) is a 14-minute promotional animated short documentary film created by John Sutherland and sponsored by General Electric (GE). The short documentary, which is now in the public domain, explains what an atom is, how nuclear energy is released from certain kinds of atoms, the peacetime uses of nuclear power, and the by-products of nuclear fission. The film is Sutherland's most-decorated film, having won numerous honors at film festivals.

The film also received a theatrical release, opening at the Pantages and Hillstreet Theatres in Los Angeles on July 2, 1953. The distributor was Al O. Bondy, who made the short available for free.

== Synopsis ==
A narrator is relating what is an atom and how atomic energy can be harnessed by man to produce "limitless" energy. Dr. Atom (a caricature with an atom for a head) then explains the similarities between the Solar System and atomic structure. He then goes on to relate how the atom is made up of protons, neutrons, and electrons. After this, the narrator explains how there are more than 90 elements with many possible isotopes for each.

The history of atomic energy is then over viewed beginning with the discovery of artificial transmutation. This then led to the discovery of nuclear fission and eventually nuclear weapons and nuclear energy using the chain reaction of radioactive material. The Oakridge uranium factory is then discussed as well as the first nuclear reactor and the first uses of plutonium. The future of fantastical nuclear power plants is then explained. The short ends on the uses of radio isotopes in medicine and agriculture.

The film includes a blue "nuclear giant" character, very similar to Dr. Manhattan from the graphic novel Watchmen.

== Re-release and update ==
A is for Atom was re-released by General Electric in 1964. John Sutherland Studios was contracted by GE to modernize the film. Changes included tighter editing, new music, new narration (Bud Hiestand did the voice-over on the original) and a focus on nuclear power as opposed to nuclear bombs.

== See also ==
- Destination Earth
- "Our Friend the Atom"
- Your Safety First
- Atoms for Peace
