= William Harcourt Ranking =

English physician (1814–1867)

William Harcourt Ranking FRCP (1814 – 4 June 1867) was an English physician, medical editor, and photographer.

After studying anatomy and physiology at the Webb Street School of Anatomy and Medicine, Southwark, W. Harcourt Ranking matriculated in October 1831 at St Catharine's College, Cambridge, where he graduated M.B. in 1837 and M.D. in 1843. He visited Paris before he was appointed physician to the Bury and Suffolk General Hospital in 1840. In 1847 he was appointed physician to the Norfolk and Norwich Hospital. He was elected FRCP in 1860. He contributed to the study of scrofula by translating Jean Lugol's 1844 treatise Recherches et observations sur les causes des maladies scrofuleuses. Ranking also lectured on diphtheria.

He was chiefly known to the profession for his editorship of the Half-Yearly Abstract of the Medical Sciences from 1845 to 1864 (in conjunction with C. B. Radcliffe after 1852) and as joint editor of the Provincial Medical and Surgical Journal from 1849 to 1852.

The half-yearly abstract of the medical sciences: being a digest of British and Continental medicine, and the progress of medicine and the collateral sciences was published from 1845 to 1873. It was published in London by John Churchill & Sons and in Philadelphia by Lindsay & Blakiston.

In 1853 the title of the Provincial Medical and Surgical Journal became The British Medical Journal. As editor of the journal, Ranking was co-editor with J. H. Walsh. Ranking and Walsh's editorship was preceded by that of Robert Streeten and followed by that of John Rose Cormack.

Ranking was a co-proprietor in the privately owned Heigham Hall Lunatic Asylum, Norwich, a director of Norwich Union Life Assurance Society, and a member of the Botanical Society of London. He was the second president of the Norwich Photographic Society. (The Society's first president was Thomas D. Eaton (1800–1871).)

Dr. Ranking was reported in photographic journals as active in the Norwich Photographic Society from 1855 to 1857. He gave an account of his chosen format, the waxed paper process, and showed ‘excellent views’.
In the 1856 Norwich Photographic Society exhibition he showed 12 prints from wax paper negatives ...

In 1843 in Marylebone, London, he married Louise Leathes Mortlock, a daughter of Sir John Cheetham Mortlock, of the Mortlock banking family. William and Louise Ranking were the parents of four daughters.

== Selected publications ==
- Lugol, Jean Guillaume Auguste (1844). Researches and observations on the causes of scrofulous diseases. Translated from the French, with an introduction, and an essay on the treatment of the principal varieties of scofula, by W. Harcourt Ranking. London: John Churchill.
- Ranking, W. H. (25 August 1860). "Pneumothorax without urgent symptoms, followed by recovery : subsequent death of the patient from dissecting aneurism of the aorta. Transactions of Branches. Cambridge and Huntingdon Branch". The British Medical Journal: 665–666.
- Ranking, W. H. (31 August 1861). "Case of general paralysis of the insane: with remarks. Transactions of Branches. East Anglian Branch". The British Medical Journal: 227–230.
