= The BMJ =

British peer-reviewed medical journal

- Discipline: Medicine
- Language: English
- Edited by: Kamran Abbasi

Publication details
- Former names: Provincial Medical and Surgical Journal, British Medical Journal, BMJ
- History: 1840–present
- Publisher: BMJ Publishing Group Ltd (United Kingdom)
- Frequency: Fortnightly in print, daily online
- Open access: Immediate, research articles only
- License: Creative Commons Attribution Non-commercial License
- Impact factor: 55.1 (2025)

Standard abbreviations
- ISO 4: BMJ

Indexing
- CODEN: DXRA5
- ISSN: 0959-8138 (print); 1756-1833 (web)
- LCCN: 97640199
- JSTOR: 09598138
- OCLC no.: 32595642

Links
- Journal homepage; Online archive

The BMJ is a biweekly peer-reviewed medical journal, published by BMJ Publishing Group Ltd, which in turn is wholly owned by the British Medical Association (BMA). The BMJ has editorial freedom from the BMA. It is one of the world's oldest general medical journals. Previously called the British Medical Journal, the title was officially shortened to BMJ in 1988, and then changed to The BMJ in 2014. The current editor-in-chief of The BMJ is Kamran Abbasi, who was appointed in January 2022.

== History ==
The journal began publishing on 3 October 1840 as the Provincial Medical and Surgical Journal and quickly attracted the attention of physicians around the world through its publication of high-quality original research articles and unique case reports. The BMJ's first editors were P. Hennis Green, lecturer on the diseases of children at the Hunterian School of Medicine, who also was its founder, and Robert Streeten of Worcester, a member of the Provincial Medical and Surgical Association council.

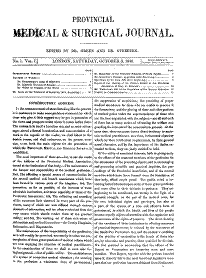
Cover of the 1st issue of the Provincial Medical and Surgical Journal

The first issue of the Provincial Medical and Surgical Journal (PMSJ) was 16 pages long and contained three simple woodcut illustrations. The longest items were the editors' introductory editorial and a report of the Provincial Medical and Surgical Association's Eastern Branch. Other pages included a condensed version of Henry Warburton's medical reform bill, book reviews, clinical papers, and case notes. There were 2 1/2 columns of advertisements. Inclusive of stamp duty it cost 7d, a price that remained until 1844. In their main article, Green and Streeten noted that they had "received as many advertisements (in proportion to the quantity of letter press) for our first number, as the most popular Medical Journal [The Lancet], after seventeen years of existence."

In their introductory editorial and later statements, Green and Streeten defined "the main objects of promotion of which the Provincial Medical and Surgical Journal is established". Summarized, there were two clear main objectives: the advancement of the profession, especially in the provinces, and dissemination of medical knowledge. Green and Streeten also expressed an interest in promoting public well-being, as well as maintaining 'medical practitioners, as a class in that rank of society which, by their intellectual acquirements, by their general moral character, and by the importance of the duties entrusted to them, they are justly entitled to hold'.

In April 1842 the journal was retitled the Provincial Medical Journal and Retrospect of the Medical Sciences, but two years later it reverted to the PMSJ under the sole editorship of Streeten. In 1857 the BMJ first appeared, when the PMSJ was merged with the Associated Medical Journal (Volumes 1–4; 1853–1856), which had itself evolved from the London Medical Journal (Volumes 1–4; 1849–1852) under the editorship of John Rose Cormack.

The BMJ published the first centrally randomized controlled trial. The journal also carried seminal papers on the causal effects of smoking on health and lung cancer and other causes of death in relation to smoking.

For a long time, the journal's sole competitor was The Lancet, also based in the UK, but with increasing globalization, The BMJ has faced tough competition from other medical journals, particularly The New England Journal of Medicine and the Journal of the American Medical Association, now known as JAMA.

In 1980, the journal split in two parts - British medical journal (Clinical research edition) [ISSN 0267-0623] and British medical journal (Practice observed edition) [ISSN 0267-0631].

== Journal content ==
The BMJ is an advocate of evidence-based medicine. It publishes research as well as clinical reviews, recent medical advances, and editorial perspectives, among others.

A special "Christmas Edition" is published annually on the Friday before Christmas. This edition is known for research articles which apply a serious academic approach to investigating less serious medical questions. The results are often humorous and widely reported by the mainstream media.

The BMJ has an open peer review system, in which authors are told who reviewed their manuscript. About half of all submitted articles are rejected without external review. Manuscripts chosen for peer review are then reviewed by external experts, who comment on the importance of the work and its suitability for publication, before the final decision on a manuscript is made by the editorial ("hanging") committee, so called because of its similarity to committees that decide which works of art should be hung in an exhibition. The acceptance rate is less than 7% for original research articles.

At the beginning of February 2021, The BMJ introduced a charge of £299 for publishing obituaries. This was widely criticized on social media, by the British Medical Association among others, because of the large number of medical staff being killed by COVID-19. The decision was explained, but reversed, by the end of the month.

=== Rapid Recommendations ===
In response to the many problems with traditional medical guidelines, the journal introduced BMJ Rapid Recommendations, a series of trustworthy guidelines focused on the most pressing medical problems.

=== Rapid Responses ===
The BMJ publishes most e-letters to the journal on its website under the heading Rapid Responses, organized as a fully moderated Internet forum. Comments are screened for unacceptable content, such as libel or obscenity, and contributors may not remove or edit contributions once they have been published. As of January 2013, 88,500 rapid responses had been posted on the BMJ's website.

== Indexing and citations ==
The BMJ is included in the major indexes PubMed, MEDLINE, EBSCO, and the Science Citation Index. The journal has long criticized the misuse of impact factors to award grants and in the recruitment of researchers by academic institutions.

The five journals that cited The BMJ most often in 2008 were (in order of descending citation frequency) The BMJ, the Cochrane Database of Systematic Reviews, The Lancet, BMC Public Health, and BMC Health Services Research. In the same year the five journals most often cited in articles published in The BMJ were The BMJ, The Lancet, The New England Journal of Medicine, Journal of the American Medical Association and the Cochrane Database of Systematic Reviews.

== Impact ==
In the 2025 Journal Citation Reports The BMJ's impact factor was reported to be 55.1. ranking it 4th among the research journals in the general medical category. However, The BMJ in 2013 reported that it had become a signatory to the San Francisco Declaration on Research Assessment (commonly known as the Dora Agreement), which deprecates the inappropriate use of journal impact factors and urges journal publishers to "greatly reduce the emphasis on the journal impact factor as a promotional tool, ideally by ceasing to promote the impact factor or by presenting it in the context of a variety of journal-based metrics."

== Cello scrotum hoax article ==
In 1974, Elaine Murphy submitted a brief case report under her husband's name John which suggested a condition known as "cello scrotum", a fictional condition that supposedly affected male cellists. It was originally submitted as a joke in response to "guitar nipple", a condition similar to jogger's nipple in which some forms of guitar playing causes irritation to the nipple, which Murphy and her husband believed was also a joke. The case report was published in The BMJ, and although not widely cited, it was cited occasionally, often by sceptics, because, for example, "when the cello is held in typical playing position, the body of the instrument is not near the scrotum."

In 2009, 35 years after the original case report was published, Murphy wrote a letter to The BMJ revealing that the report had been a hoax.

== Website and access policies ==
The BMJ went fully online in 1995 and archived all its issues on the World Wide Web. In addition to the print content, the site contains supporting material for original research articles, additional news stories, and electronic letters to the editors.

In 1999, all content of The BMJ was made freely available online; however, in 2006 this changed to a subscription model. Original research articles continue to be available free, but from January 2006 all other "added value" contents, including clinical reviews and editorials, require a subscription. The BMJ allows complete free access for visitors from economically disadvantaged countries as part of the HINARI initiative.

In October 2008 The BMJ announced that it would become an open access journal for research articles. A subscription continued to be required for access to other articles.

== Editions ==
The BMJ is principally an online journal, and only the website carries the full text content of every article. However, print editions are produced, targeting different groups of readers with selections of content, some of it abridged, and different advertising. The print editions are:

- General Practice (weekly) for general practitioners
- Clinical Research (weekly) for hospital doctors
- Academic (monthly) for institutions, researchers, and medical academics

The BMJ also publishes a number of overseas/ foreign language editions: Argentine (in Spanish), Greek, Romanian, Chinese, and Middle Eastern (in English). There is also the Student BMJ, an online resource for medical students and junior doctors, which publishes an annual print edition each September.

=== Other services and information ===
The BMJ offers several alerting services, free on request:

- This Week In The BMJ: A weekly table of contents email, latest research, video, blogs and editorial comment.
- Editor's choice: The Editor-in-Chief or an Associate Editor introduces a selection of the latest research, medical news, comment, and education each week.
- Today on bmj.com A daily alert with links to a short selection of articles published in The BMJ in the previous 24 hours.

== Editors ==
- P. Hennis Green and Robert Streeten (1840–1844)
- Robert Streeten (1844–1849)
- W.H. Ranking and J.H. Walsh (1849–1853)
- John Rose Cormack (1853–1855)
- Andrew Wynter (1855–1861)
- William Orlando Markham (1861–1866)
- Ernest Hart (1866–1869)
- Jonathan Hutchinson (1869–1871)
- Ernest Hart (1871–1898)
- Sir Dawson Williams (1898–1928)
- Norman Gerald Horner (1928–1946)
- Hugh Clegg (1947–1965)
- Martin Ware (1966–1975)
- Stephen Lock (1975–1991)
- Richard Smith (1991–2004)
- Kamran Abbasi (Acting E-i-C) (2004– 2005)
- Fiona Godlee (2005–2021)
- Kamran Abbasi (2022–present)
