= Frank Spooner Churchill =

American physician

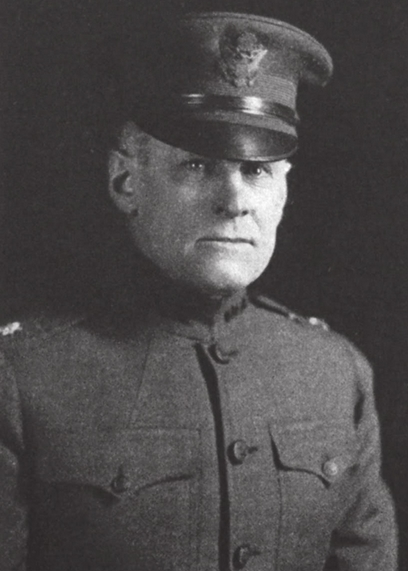
- Churchill in army uniform, c. 1917
- Born: August 26, 1864; Milton, Massachusetts, United States
- Died: February 27, 1946 (aged 81); Boston, Massachusetts, United States
- Education: Harvard University
- Medical career
- Profession: Physician
- Field: Paediatrics

Frank Spooner Churchill (August 26, 1864 – February 27, 1946) was an American paediatrician who took a special interest in infant feeding. A graduate of Harvard University, as a paediatrician Churchill took a particular interest in public health, early child health and in breastfeeding. Much of his research centered around the untoward effects of lack of breast milk or inadequate modified milk.

He became the chief editor of the American Journal of Diseases of Children and the president of the American Pediatric Society. After the First World War, he went on to hold senior positions with a number of child health boards and organisations.

== Early life ==
Frank Spooner Churchill was born on August 26, 1864, in Milton, Massachusetts. He graduated from Harvard University with an AB in 1886, before receiving his MD in 1890.

== Career ==
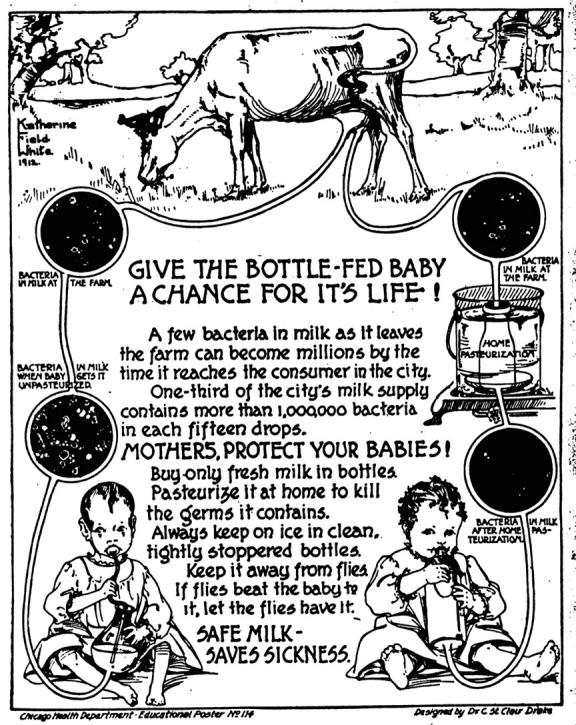
"Give The Bottle-Fed Baby a Chance For It's Life!" Chicago Health Department poster, Ladies Home Journal, 1900

Churchill's hospital appointments included attending paediatrician at the Cook County Hospital and Presbyterian Hospital and president of the medical staff at Children's Memorial Hospital from 1909–1917. He was also an associate professor of paediatrics at Rush Medical College. In 1912, he was resident physician to the American Geographic Society of New York's expedition to the west coast.

Between 1911 and 1919 he was chief editor of the American Journal of Diseases of Children, and in 1916–17 was president of the American Pediatric Society.

He left his position at Children's Memorial Hospital in 1917 to serve as a major in the United States Army during the First World War. After the war he became more involved in public health. He held senior positions with Chicago Board of Health, the Chicago Milk Commission, the Infant Welfare Society of Chicago and the Juvenile Psychopathic Institute.

=== Breastfeeding ===
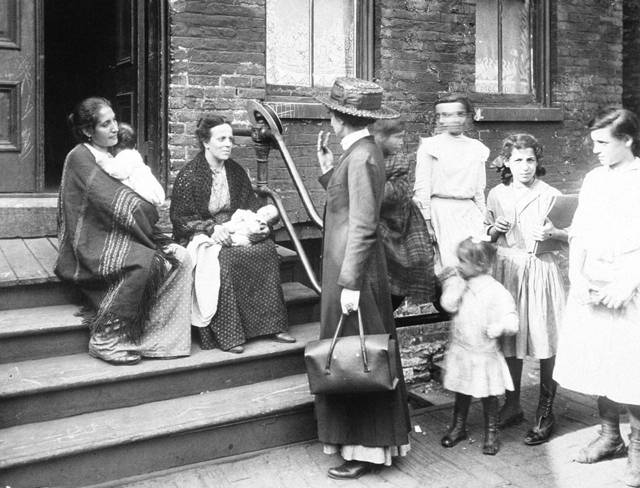
A nurse of the Infant Welfare Society of Chicago talks with mothers of infants in 1911.

Churchill established the first infant's clinic at Children's Memorial Hospital and was an advocate of breast feeding but believed that the milk could be spoiled if it was taken at the wrong frequency or if the mother was nervous or anxious, rendering her "utterly unfit to serve the purpose of a cow". Also an advocate of modified cow's milk (formula milk), he concluded that modified milk could only be afforded by an elite few but was beneficial as it was more closer to breast milk than the alternatives.

His 1896 study, "Infant Feeding", gave a number of case studies of infant feeding and the progress of the child and asked what was the best food for infants in the first year of life? Churchill stated categorically that "there can be and is but one answer, average breast milk". In the 1910s, he advocated the employment of wet nurses by hospitals.

=== Further paediatric work ===
In 1912, Churchill demonstrated, using the Wassermann test, the underestimated existence of congenital syphilis in Chicago hospitals.

Before the Second World War, he invited into his home Jewish psychiatrists from Germany and Austria who had an interest in childhood development and were refugees from the Nazis. He asked the U.S. government to establish guidance clinics for children across Europe in order to treat the psychological effects of the war before they became permanent.

== Death ==
Churchill died in Boston, Massachusetts, on February 27, 1946.

== Publications ==
- "Infant Feeding", Chicago Medical Recorder, February 10, 1896, pp. 102–114.
- Medical Disease of Infancy and Childhood. 2nd edition. Cassell, London, 1898. (With Dawson Williams)
- "Observations on Infant Feeding, with Report of Cases", Journal of the American Medical Association, Vol. XLIV, No. 21 (May 27, 1905), pp. 1653–1659. doi:10.1001/jama.1905.92500480001001
- "The Wassermann Reaction in Infants and Children: A Clinical Study", American Journal of Diseases of Children. Vol. III, No. 6 (1912), pp. 363–397. doi:10.1001/archpedi.1912.04100180024002.
