= John Sutherland =

John Sutherland may refer to:

== Politicians ==
- John Sutherland (New South Wales politician) (1816–1889), member of the NSW Legislative Assembly and Council
- John Sutherland (Canadian senator) (1821–1899), Canadian Senator from Manitoba
- John Sutherland (Manitoba politician) (1837–1922), provincial politician in Manitoba, Canada
- John Sutherland (British politician) (1854–1918), Scottish Liberal politician

== Nobility ==
- John of Sutherland (1344–1361), Scottish noble
- John Sutherland, 7th Earl of Sutherland (died 1460), chief of the Clan Sutherland
- John Sutherland, 8th Earl of Sutherland (died 1508), chief of the Clan Sutherland
- John Sutherland, 9th Earl of Sutherland (died 1514), chief of the Clan Sutherland

== Film and television ==
- John Sutherland, character in Altars of Desire
- John Sutherland (producer) (1910–2001), producer who played the adult Bambi in the 1942 film, Bambi
- John Harrison (director) (born 1948), who is sometimes credited as John Sutherland

== Academics ==
- John Sutherland (AI researcher)
- John Sutherland (physician) (1808–1891), physician and promoter of sanitary science
- John Sutherland (Canadian writer) (1919–1956), Canadian poet, literary critic, and magazine editor
- John Sutherland (author) (born 1938), English academic, newspaper columnist and author
- John Sutherland (chemist) (born 1962), British chemist
- John Derg Sutherland (1905–1991), Scottish psychoanalyst
- John W. Sutherland (born 1958), professor of environmental and ecological engineering at Purdue University
- John Francis Sutherland (1854–1912), Scottish physician

== Others ==
- Jock Sutherland (1889–1948), American football coach
- John Steven Sutherland (born 1983), American musician, lead singer for the B3 boy band
- J. W. Sutherland (John Waters Sutherland, 1870–1946), mining engineer and metallurgist in Western Australia
- John Sutherland (footballer) (1904–1966), Australian rules footballer
- John Sutherland, Ontario crown attorney; former director of the Special Investigations Unit

== See also ==
- Jonathan Sutherland (born 1977), Scottish television and radio presenter
