= Haddy =

Haddy is a surname and a given name. Notable people with the name include:

Surname:

- Anne Haddy (1930–1999), Australian actress, TV presenter and voice artist
- Arthur Haddy OBE (1906–1989), English recording engineer
- R. J. Haddy, special effects artist and airbrush dealer

Given name:

- Haddy Dandeh-Jabbie, Gambian women's rights activist, public speaker and lawyer
- Haddy Jallow (born 1985), Gambian-Swedish actress, winner of Sweden's top film award
- John Haddy James (1788–1869), English physician
- Martin Haddy Khallidden (born 1998), Bruneian footballer
- Haddy Njie (born 1979), Norwegian singer, songwriter, writer and journalist

== See also ==
- Haddy Collider, fictional villain in Kiya & the Kimoja Heroes
- Haddy charr, Salvelinus killinensis, a fish found in some lakes in Scotland
