= Glorious Purpose (Loki season 1) =

- Loki episode
- Promotional poster
- Episode no.: Season 1 Episode 1
- Directed by: Kate Herron
- Written by: Michael Waldron
- Cinematography by: Autumn Durald Arkapaw
- Editing by: Paul Zucker
- Original release date: June 9, 2021
- Running time: 52 minutes

Cast
- Derek Russo as Hunter U-92; Josh Fadem as Martin

Episode chronology
← Previous —	Next → "The Variant"
- Loki season 1

"Glorious Purpose" is the first episode of the first season of the American television series Loki, based on Marvel Comics featuring the character Loki. It follows an alternate version of the character who is arrested by the mysterious Time Variance Authority (TVA) after creating a new timeline during the events of Avengers: Endgame (2019). The episode is set in the Marvel Cinematic Universe (MCU), sharing continuity with the films of the franchise. It was written by head writer Michael Waldron and directed by Kate Herron.

Tom Hiddleston reprises his role as Loki from the film series, with Gugu Mbatha-Raw, Wunmi Mosaku, Eugene Cordero, Tara Strong, and Owen Wilson also starring. Waldron was hired in February 2019 to write the episode and serve as head writer of the series, with Herron joining in August. Filming took place at Pinewood Atlanta Studios, with location filming in the Atlanta metropolitan area.

"Glorious Purpose" was released on Disney+ on June 9, 2021. It became the most-watched Disney+ premiere and received critical acclaim, with praise in particular going to Hiddleston and Wilson's on-screen chemistry together.

== Plot ==
During the Battle of New York in 2012, Loki escapes with the Tesseract, creating a branched timeline. (Note: As depicted in the film Avengers: Endgame (2019).) At the Gobi Desert, he is quickly arrested by officers of the Time Variance Authority (TVA) and brought to their headquarters, where he cannot use his magic. TVA mascot Miss Minutes tells Loki that a past multiversal war between timelines was ended by the Time-Keepers by establishing a singular timeline and that to prevent another such war, the Time-Keepers created the TVA and its employees to maintain this timeline, the "Sacred Timeline". The TVA does this by "resetting" branched timelines and the "variants" that cause them.

Loki faces trial for "crimes against the Sacred Timeline", with Ravonna Renslayer as the judge. He initially does not take the proceedings seriously before blaming the Avengers, whose own time-traveling caused him to come into contact with the Tesseract. Renslayer dismisses these claims, explaining that the Avengers' actions followed the Sacred Timeline while Loki's did not. She finds him guilty and sentences him to be reset, but TVA agent Mobius M. Mobius intervenes as he thinks this variant Loki could be of use to them. In the Time Theater, Mobius questions Loki's past misdeeds and revisits moments from Loki's life, such as his defeat at the hands of the Avengers. (Note: As depicted in the film The Avengers (2012).) Loki says he wants to rule so he can free his would-be subjects from the burden of making wrong choices. Mobius questions if Loki enjoys hurting others, but Loki rails against the TVA's supposed control of the timeline and insists that he has the power to make his own choices. To refute this, Mobius reveals that in Loki's intended future, he inadvertently causes the death of his adoptive mother Frigga. (Note: As depicted in the film Thor: The Dark World (2013).)

Loki attempts to escape but discovers that the TVA has amassed numerous Infinity Stones, which do not work at TVA headquarters. Overwhelmed by the TVA's power, he returns to the Time Theater and views the rest of his intended future, including his improved relationship with his adoptive brother Thor, the death of his adoptive father Odin, (Note: As depicted in the film Thor: Ragnarok (2017).) and his own death at the hands of Thanos. (Note: As depicted in the film Avengers: Infinity War (2018).) Loki realizes that he cannot return to his timeline and despondently confesses to Mobius his wrongdoings are born from desperation for control over his life. Hearing Loki's self-reflection, Mobius convinces him to help hunt the killer of several TVA officers, who has been stealing the technology they use to reset timelines, and reveals that this fugitive is another variant of Loki.

== Production ==
=== Development ===
By September 2018, Marvel Studios was developing a limited series starring Tom Hiddleston's Loki from the Marvel Cinematic Universe (MCU) films. Loki was confirmed to be in development by Disney CEO Bob Iger in November. Michael Waldron was hired as head writer in February 2019, and was also set to write the first episode of the series, with Kate Herron hired to direct the series in August. Herron and Waldron executive produce alongside Hiddleston and Marvel Studios' Kevin Feige, Louis D'Esposito, Victoria Alonso, and Stephen Broussard. The first episode is titled "Glorious Purpose", which is taken from a phrase that Loki says in the episode as well as in his MCU film appearances.

=== Writing ===
This episode picks up with the 2012 version of Loki from Avengers: Endgame (2019) who creates a branched timeline, which means he has not experienced the events from Thor: The Dark World (2013) to Avengers: Infinity War (2018). Waldron knew early on that the character would need to experience those events in some way to start him on a different journey that the writer hoped would be "equally fulfilling" as the character's storyline in the films. Finding the right moments from his life for Loki to witness was very important to the creative team. As part of Herron's pitch to Marvel, she had referenced a scene from Minority Report (2002) where John Anderton sees a projection of his wife as something that Loki should experience. She felt approaching Loki's history this way was "such a smart storytelling device" and a good way to inform the audience of his history if they were less familiar with the character. Including the death of Frigga was "a very important moment for him to see" according to Herron because that character was "his heart", while Hiddleston suggested including Odin saying "I love you my sons". The goal was to also show Loki having "some wins and show that he had room for change and growth". Waldron and his writers' room felt that Loki's realization of his overall purpose in his life was reminiscent to Buzz Lightyear's realization of him being a toy and not a space ranger in Toy Story (1995).

Herron called the episode's Miss Minutes informational video "genius" because it was able to bring levity along with the necessary "world-building" in a quick way to explain who the TVA are, adding it was "a really smart way to... see the TVA through Loki's eyes" and have the audience learning the rules of the TVA along with him. Revealing that the Infinity Stones are powerless in the TVA was meant to establish the organization as "the real power in the universe" after the Stones were previously believed to be the greatest power. Herron felt that doing this established a "completely new terrain" for the MCU with "new rules and new power". Waldron chose to show that Loki was the criminal known as D. B. Cooper as a way to pay homage to a viral fan theory that Don Draper from the series Mad Men (2007-2015) was destined to become Cooper. This moment was also chosen to provide an example of a moment when the audience might have thought the Time Variance Authority (TVA) would have intervened in his life but did not. Herron had envisioned the episode as the prologue of the series, with the second episode "The Variant" more of the first chapter.

=== Casting ===
The episode stars Tom Hiddleston as Loki, Gugu Mbatha-Raw as Ravonna Renslayer, Wunmi Mosaku as Hunter B-15, Eugene Cordero as Casey, Tara Strong as the voice of Miss Minutes, and Owen Wilson as Mobius M. Mobius. Also appearing are Derek Russo as Hunter U-92 and comedian Josh Fadem as Martin. Additionally, members of the Avengers appear in archive footage from Avengers: Endgame, with other MCU cast members appearing in footage from different films such as Rene Russo as Frigga, Anthony Hopkins as Odin, Clark Gregg as Phil Coulson, and Josh Brolin as Thanos. Herron, a comedy fan, was looking to find comedians who would be fun to include in the series, and called casting Fadem in the episode "a miracle".

=== Filming ===
Filming took place at Pinewood Atlanta Studios in Atlanta, Georgia, with Herron directing, and Autumn Durald Arkapaw serving as cinematographer. Location filming took place in the Atlanta metropolitan area. A practical set was utilized for when Loki and Mobius step out of the elevator and walk down a long hallway, which was done so Herron and Arkapaw could film it with long takes. Herron felt having this set gave a "level of reality" to the TVA to make it "feel like a real, living space".

The opening sequence features footage from Avengers: Endgame shot by directors Anthony and Joe Russo. Herron chose different takes and angles of the footage from those used in the film and also filmed some new material for the sequence, such as Loki waving to the Hulk in the elevator, so the sequence would be told more from Loki's point of view than the version in Endgame was. Despite these changes, which reminded her of the point of view use in Rashomon (1950), Herron felt the sequence would have a familiar cadence for the audience. When Loki is arrested by the TVA, Hunter B-15 hits him with a Time Stick which knocks Loki into slow-motion. The scene was filmed multiple times, including once with the two characters together, once each for the characters separately, and at least once with Hiddleston filmed at slow motion. The different elements were then combined using visual effects. For the later scene when Loki forces B-15 to jump around in time, Mosaku had to film around 25 takes in different locations that were later combined with visual effects.

The stack of paper that Loki is asked to sign when he arrives at the TVA includes everything that he has ever said. There was a lot of debate among the creative team over how big the stack should be, with the props department taking everything that Loki says in the MCU films and extrapolating that using mathematics to create a stack that seemed like it could realistically be everything the character has ever said. Herron acknowledged that there would be "much-heated debate on Reddit about the size of that paper". When incorporating footage of Loki's life from past MCU films, Herron tried to make it a "play of his life" rather than a clip show. She played the footage on her computer on set for Hiddleston to react to during filming. Herron changed the aspect ratio for the D. B. Cooper flashback to full screen since it is a "big cinematic moment" that was previously unseen. An additional flashback was filmed in which Loki claims the throne of Asgard but is defeated by Throg. Herron found the scene "quite funny" and "beautifully written", but it was cut from the episodes because the D. B. Cooper scene was already a funny flashback and having another one did not fit with the tone of the overall sequence which was leading to Loki witnessing Frigga's death. Footage of this scene was used in the series' marketing, with some commentators referring to the version of Loki in the footage as "King Loki".

Arkapaw enjoyed working on the Time Theater set, one of her favorite sets for the series, because it created the "opportunity to feel textural and moody, and create symmetry". The set featured a Brutalist ceiling, with lights that moved, which Arkapaw wanted to incorporate after seeing cinematographer Roger Deakins utilize moving light in Blade Runner 2049 (2017). Arkapaw's gaffer and key grip figured out how to move the lights without causing shadows between each of the sections of lighting to make it appear as if the lights were moving at the same time, which resulted in a "very subtle" effect. She noted these movements were timed to the dialogue, mostly noticeable while the actors are sitting.

=== Animation and visual effects ===
Titmouse, Inc. animated the Miss Minutes informational video, with Herron enjoying that the hand-drawn animation was used since it was a style no longer used frequently. The video was inspired by the Mr. DNA cartoon in Jurassic Park (1993) and public service announcements from "all the eras" that inspired Herron. Strong, who voices Miss Minutes, enjoyed the Mr. DNA comparison because the TVA and Jurassic Park both had the "juxtaposition of very high-end, modern technology with very basic, classic '60 and '70s animation". Commentators noted some animation inspirations included 1950s public service announcements for the car industry (the Miss Minutes video begins similarly to Walt Disney's Magic Highway U.S.A., while it has similar character designs, tone, and narration style to Your Safety First produced by Automobile Manufacturers of America); the 1950s Disney space documentaries created by Ward Kimball; the "mid-century modern" animation pioneered by United Productions of America; and the Warner Bros. Cartoons Merrie Melodies cartoon Duck Dodgers in the 24½th Century (1953).

Visual effects for the episode were created by Method Studios, Lola Visual Effects, FuseFX, Crafty Apes, Cantina Creative, Industrial Light & Magic (who also provided animation), Luma Pictures, and Rise.

=== Music ===
The music of the Miss Minutes information video, like its visuals, was also inspired by the Wonderful World of Disney videos, with composer Natalie Holt expanding her "creepy theremin layers" of the TVA themes when the Time-Keepers are shown in the video; Holt created the music in the style of Bernard Herrmann. Holt was "really keen" to write the music for this as well as the D. B. Cooper scene, noting these moments would normally be left to the series' music supervisor to source existing music cues.

== Marketing ==
After the episode's release, Marvel announced merchandise inspired by the episode as part of its weekly "Marvel Must Haves" promotion for each episode of the series, including Funko Pops, apparel, accessories, the young adult novel Loki: Where Mischief Lies, and posters. The merchandise was centered on the TVA, Mobius, and Miss Minutes. Marvel also released a promotional poster for "Glorious Purpose", which featured a quote from the episode.

== Release ==
"Glorious Purpose" was released on Disney+ on June 9, 2021. The episode, along with the rest of Loki's first season, was released on Ultra HD Blu-ray and Blu-ray on September 26, 2023. The release also includes deleted scenes from the season, including one from this episode featuring Chris Hemsworth as the voice of Throg.

== Reception ==
=== Audience viewership ===
Disney CEO Bob Chapek announced that "Glorious Purpose" was the most-watched series premiere for the streaming service in its opening week. Viewer tracking application Samba TV reported that "Glorious Purpose" was the most-watched Marvel Disney+ series premiere in its first day in the United States with 890,000 households watching the episode, as well as the best five-day viewership for Disney+ with 2.5 million household views. These were ahead of the premieres for WandaVision (759,000 households first day; 1.6 million five-day) and The Falcon and the Winter Soldier (655,000; 1.8 million). Nielsen Media Research, who measure the number of minutes watched by United States audiences on television sets, listed Loki as the third-most watched original series across streaming services for the week of June 7–13, with 731 million minutes viewed, which was equated to over 14 million Disney+ accounts watching the premiere. The minutes viewed were more than the premieres of The Falcon and the Winter Soldier (495 million minutes) and WandaVision (434 million).

=== Critical response ===
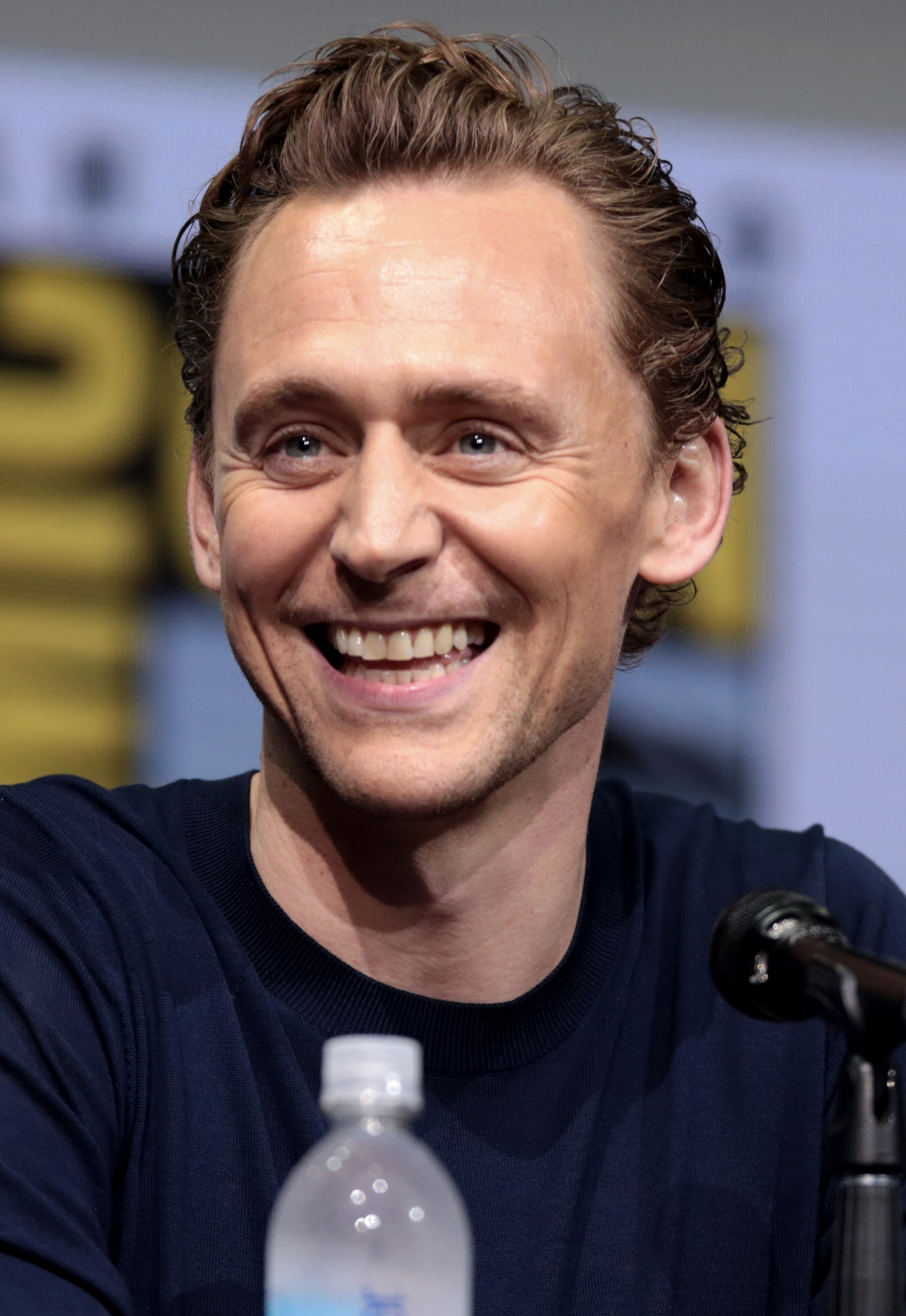
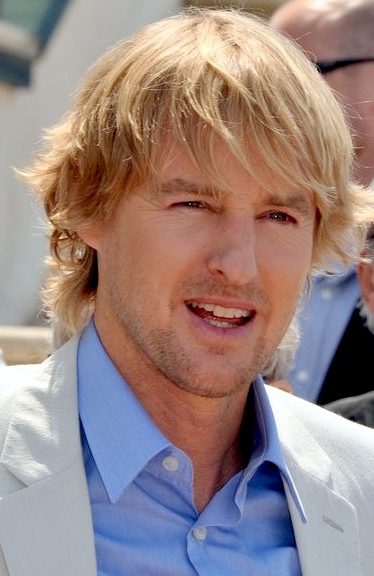
Critics highlighted the chemistry between Tom Hiddleston (L) and Owen Wilson (R) in the episode

The review aggregator website Rotten Tomatoes reported a 97% approval rating with an average score of 7.7/10 based on 36 reviews. The site's critical consensus reads: "Though "Glorious Purpose" bears the burden of a tremendous amount of exposition, there's no denying the joy of Tom Hiddleston and Owen Wilson's budding chemistry."

Giving "Glorious Purpose" an "A−", Caroline Siede at The A.V. Club felt the series was going to be "a hell of a fun ride" based on the humor of the episode which she felt was better than the "strained attempts" in The Falcon and the Winter Soldier. Though she felt the episode was mostly exposition with not much to the story, including clips from past MCU films, Siede never felt like the episode dragged since "part of the fun is in watching the franchise revisit and recontextualize its own past". She felt the premiere combined the "tactile worldbuilding of Guardians of the Galaxy with the offbeat humor of Ant-Man and the meaty character reflections of Iron Man 3". Alan Sepinwall of Rolling Stone felt the premiere struggled to "shoulder the burden" of everything that Waldron and Herron were trying to accomplish, but found the performances of Hiddleston and Wilson prevented the episode from "collaps[ing] under the weight" of all its exposition. Overall, he felt "Glorious Purpose" was "as good a starting place as any for Loki's first adventure as an MCU protagonist" and believed the series was "starting off to be more entertaining, and weirder" than The Falcon and the Winter Soldier's early episodes.

Siddhant Adlakha, writing for IGN, felt the episode had "a number of laughs and fun concepts, [but was] one where the drama doesn't always neatly fit together". Adlakha enjoyed Hiddleston and Wilson's "classic two-man act", but felt the dramatic segments that broke up their banter were "far less compelling" and made the episode feel like a clip show. Praise was also given to Holt's music that "adds a sense of strangeness and possibility" and Kasra Farahani's production design, with Adlakha giving "Glorious Purpose" a 7 out of 10. In her recap of the episode for Entertainment Weekly, Lauren Morgan said, "the first episode shows that there is a lot of life left in Loki and the new Disney+ series promises to examine aspects of the God of Mischief that we never saw in the films". She believed Hiddleston was "having a blast" in the role and the pairing of him with Wilson was "nothing short of inspired", since she was never sure who had the upper hand or was telling the truth in their exchanges. Additionally, Morgan called the TVA sets a "visual feast".

=== Accolades ===
Kasra Farahani won for Excellence in Production Design for a One-Hour Period or Fantasy Single-Camera Series at the 2022 Art Directors Guild Awards. Waldron was nominated for Best Writing in a Streaming Series, Drama at the 2nd Hollywood Critics Association TV Awards for his work on the episode. For the 74th Primetime Creative Arts Emmy Awards, Farahani, Natasha Gerasimova, and Claudia Bonfe were nominated for Outstanding Production Design for a Narrative Contemporary Program (One Hour or More); Christine Wada, Nora Pederson, Tamsin Costello, and Carol Beadle were nominated for Outstanding Fantasy/Sci-Fi Costumes; and Holt was nominated for Outstanding Music Composition for a Series (Original Dramatic Score).

== See also ==
- "Glorious Purpose", title of the second season's final episode
