= Webster Technique =

Chiropractic adjustment technique

The Webster Technique is a method within the field of chiropractic that proponents claim can assist in rotating a breech baby. The scientific studies on this technique are minimal in number and weak in conclusion, such that some chiropractic colleges and regulatory groups disallow their members from advertising the technique at all.

== Origin ==
The Webster Technique first appeared in 1986 as developed by its namesake, Larry Webster, D.C. Webster was the founder of the International Chiropractic Pediatric Association (ICPA). This organization strives to "promote and defend" the use of chiropractic for children and pregnant women.

The ICPA offers a "Diplomate in Chiropractic Pediatrics" as an additional certification to be earned after a Doctor of Chiropractic degree. This program consists of classroom learning and, same as a standard chiropractic college, the program "has no hospital affiliation and provides no hands-on clinical experience."

After Webster's death in 1997, Jeanne Ohm worked with Webster's widow to formalize a certification program specifically for the Webster Technique. This certification of proficiency can be attained after a 12-hour course.

== Method ==
Advocates of the Webster Technique claim that it is “a specific chiropractic adjustment to eliminate sacral subluxation and improve nerve system function in the pelvis”." They suggest that these potential subluxations can lead to the baby being unable to properly rotate. Thus, the Webster Technique is meant to "open up" the pelvis and "provide space" for the baby to move and continue development. The technique itself consists of chiropractic adjustments to the lower back as well as abdominal massage.

== Regulations ==
On 7 March 2016 the Royal Australian and New Zealand College of Obstetricians and Gynaecologists addressed the Webster Technique:

RANZCOG supports the Chiropractic Board of Australia in its clear position that chiropractic care must not be represented or provided as a treatment to the unborn child as an obsteric breech correction technique. Chiropractors should not be using the "Webster Technique" or any other inappropriate breech correction technique to facilitate breech version as there is insufficient scientific evidence to support this practice.

According to the Australian Skeptics The Skeptic magazine's June 2020 issue, as of May 2020 there were still at least 51 Australian chiropractors who advertise the Webster Technique, despite having been previously reported to the Australian Health Practitioner Regulation Agency.

In British Columbia, the College of Chiropractors of B.C. has adjusted their policies on chiropractors making efficacy claims, specifically around pregnancy. They allowed their practitioners until 30 January 2020 to update their marketing materials or potentially face discipline.

The college's website states they have

become concerned with statements made by some registrants which suggest that chiropractic care has the ability to turn a breech baby in utero and promote easier birth experiences. These claims are not well supported by evidence and are therefore misleading to the public.

They are no longer permitted to claim they can "move a fetus out of the breech position", "give a fetus more room to develop", or that they can "help pregnant women avoid birth by caesarean section", among other things.

The college has updated the chiropractors' professional conduct handbook such that the Webster Technique may only be advertised as "a specific chiropractic sacral analysis and diversified adjustment for all weight-bearing individuals", with nothing specific to pregnancy mentioned.

== See also ==
- external cephalic version
