= Herbert R. Spencer =

British obstetrician (1860-1941)

Professor Herbert R. Spencer MD MRCS LSA FRCP
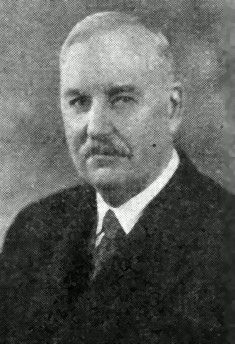
- Born: 16 January 1860; Atherstone
- Died: 28 August 1941 (aged 81)
- Education: University College Hospital
- Known for: External cephalic version; History of medicine
- Medical career
- Profession: Obstetrician
- Notable works: "The Dangers and Diagnosis of Breech Presentation, and its Treatment by External Version Towards the End of Pregnancy", 1901.; Tumours Complicating Pregnancy, Labour, and the Puerperium: Being the Lettsomian Lectures &c, 1920.

Herbert Ritchie Spencer FRCP (16 January 1860 – 28 August 1941) was professor of obstetrics at University College London.

Spencer wrote numerous articles and books on gynaecological and obstetric topics, as well as on the history of midwifery and the English anatomist and physiologist William Harvey. In 1901, he published an article on breech birth, where he discussed its dangers and encouraged antenatal screening by examining the abdomen for difficult foetal positions, and advised on its management with particular reference to the external cephalic version.

He was active amongst various medical societies and was president of the Obstetric and Gynaecology section of the British Medical Association (BMA), president of the Obstetrical Society of London, president of the Obstetrics and Gynaecology section at the Royal Society of Medicine (RSM), and later president of the History of Medicine Society of the RSM. In addition, he was an examiner for both the Royal College of Physicians and the Royal College of Surgeons and the universities of Oxford, Cambridge, and London.

== Early life ==
Herbert Spencer was born on 16 January 1860, in Atherstone, Warwickshire; one of at least two children of Henry Spencer, a railway contractor. Spencer was named after his uncle, the philosopher and political theorist Herbert Spencer.

He attended Atherstone Grammar School and in 1879, gained admission to medicine at University College London, achieving the LSA and MRCS in 1883. He received honours in the MBBS finals in 1884 and his MD in 1886.

== Career ==
After a tour of Australasia and Europe, Spencer took up an assistant post in the midwifery department of University College Hospital, under the influence of the then eminent accoucheur, Sir John Williams, followed by an appointment as assistant obstetric physician in 1887. In 1893, he was given the position of Professor of Obstetric Medicine by University College, where he remained until 1925.

Spencer was an examiner for the Royal College of Physicians, the Royal College of Surgeons and for the Universities of Oxford, Cambridge, and London.

He was as a lifelong friend of T. W. P. Lawrence FRCP and Sir Dawson Williams.

=== External cephalic version ===
In 1901, he published an article on the complications of breech birth, where he advocated routine examination of the pregnant abdomen and described how to turn a baby should it be in the feet or bottom first position.

The procedure of external cephalic version (ECV) had previously been described by François Mauriceau in the 17th century as “a little more difficult than turning an omelette in a frying pan”, and in 1807, the German Justus Heinrich Wigand published a more detailed account. Adolphe Pinard, in France, increased its acceptance further despite many sceptics.

=== Societies ===
In 1905, he was president of the Obstetric and Gynaecology section of the British Medical Association (BMA). Two years later, he became the president of the Obstetrical Society of London which later was one of the societies that merged into the Royal Society of Medicine (RSM) when Spencer became the president of the Obstetrics and Gynaecology section at the RSM. In 1923, he presided over the Medical Society of London, where three years earlier he had given the Lettsomian lecture.

== Medical historian ==
Spencer was a noted medical historian. He was a particular student of the work of William Harvey who described the circulation of blood in 1628, and gave the Harveian Oration in 1921 on the subject of "Harvey as Obstetric Physician and Gynaecologist" which G. H. Brown described as also establishing Harvey as "an obstetrician of the first rank". In 1927, he gave the Fitzpatrick Lecture on "The History of British Midwifery (1650–1800)", and he was president of the History of Medicine Society of the Royal Society of Medicine from 1928–1930. He assembled an important collection of early writings on obstetrics.

== Death and legacy ==
Spencer died on 28 August 1941, at Flat 4f, 73 Bickenhall Mansions, Marylebone Road, London. He left an estate of £46,355.

== Selected publications ==
=== Books ===
- Tumours Complicating Pregnancy, Labour, and the Puerperium: Being the Lettsomian Lectures &c. Harrison & Sons, London, 1920.
- Caesarean Section. 1925.
- The History of British Midwifery from 1650 to 1800. Bale & Danielsson, London, 1927. (Fitzpatrick Lectures)

=== Articles ===
- Spencer, HR (1901). "The Dangers and Diagnosis of Breech Presentation, and its Treatment by External Version Towards the End of Pregnancy". Br Med J. 1 (2107): 1192–6. doi:10.1136/bmj.1.2107.1192. PMC 2401048. PMID 20759619..
- Spencer, Herbert R. (1904). "Fibromyoma of the Intra-Abdominal Portion of the Round Ligament of the Uterus.*". BJOG: An International Journal of Obstetrics and Gynaecology. 5 (2): 119–135. doi:10.1111/j.1471-0528.1904.tb07186.x. S2CID 71859294..
- Spencer, Herbert R. (1906). "A Second Case of Abdominal Ovariotomy during Labour, with Remarks.*". BJOG: An International Journal of Obstetrics and Gynaecology. 9 (3): 180–183. doi:10.1111/j.1471-0528.1906.tb08673.x. S2CID 71971010..
- Spencer, Herbert R. (1907). "II. Fibro-Myomatous Uterus weighing over seven pounds, removed from a woman aged 22.*". BJOG: An International Journal of Obstetrics and Gynaecology. 12 (3): 218–219. doi:10.1111/j.1471-0528.1907.tb15427.x. S2CID 72173058..
- Spencer, Herbert R. (1923). "Adenoma of the Vaginal Fornix simulating Cancer of the Cervix.1". BJOG: An International Journal of Obstetrics and Gynaecology. 30 (Obstet Gynaecol Sect): 44–46. doi:10.1111/j.1471-0528.1923.tb06243.x. PMC 2103524. PMID 19983114..
- Spencer, Herbert R. (1923). "A Congenital Deformity of the Posterior Lip of the Cervix". BJOG: An International Journal of Obstetrics and Gynaecology. 30 (2): 202–203. doi:10.1111/j.1471-0528.1923.tb06634.x. S2CID 72528256..
