= Norman Gerald Horner =

English physician, surgeon, and medical editor (1882–1954)

Norman Gerald Horner FRCP FRCS
- Born: 1 January 1882; Tonbridge, England
- Died: 7 March 1954 (aged 72); London, England
- Education: Gonville and Caius College, Cambridge
- Occupations: medical doctor; medical editor
- Known for: editorship of the British Medical Journal, 1926–1946

Norman Gerald Horner (1 January 1882 – 7 March 1954) was a physician, surgeon, and medical editor.

== Biography ==
After education at Tonbridge School, N. Gerald Horner matriculated in October 1899 at Gonville and Caius College, Cambridge, graduating there B.A. in 1902, M.B. and B.Chir. in 1910, M.A. in 1919, and M.D in 1922. At St Bartholomew's Hospital, he qualified M.R.C.S. and L.R.C.P. in 1906. After qualification, he was, for a brief time, a house surgeon at the Westminster Hospital and then was appointed a house physician to St Bartholomew's Hospital.

He edited the St. Bartholomew’s Hospital Journal, and subsequently wrote for the Hospital, edited by Sir Henry Burdett, to whom Horner was eventually assistant. He combined these literary activities with interludes of general practice and clinical assistantships at Bart’s and at the Children’s Hospital in Shadwell.

He was from 1911 to 1915 an assistant editor at The Lancet under the editorship of Sir Samuel Squire Sprigge. Horner served from 1914 to 1919 as a captain in the RAMC and during WW I was in France for two years. On the editorial staff of the British Medical Journal, he was from 1917 to 1928 an assistant editor (under Sir Dawson Williams) and from 1928 to 1946 editor-in-chief, as successor to Williams, who died in 1928. Horner retired in 1946 at age sixty-five and was succeeded as editor-in-chief by Hugh Clegg, CBE, FRCP.

Horner was elected FRCP in 1939 and FRCS in 1942.

== Family ==
His father had been a surgeon and naturalist on two Arctic expeditions before settling down to general practice in Tonbridge, where he was medical officer at Tonbridge School.

N. Gerald Horner's father, Arthur Claypon Horner (died 1893), was the surgeon and naturalist on the Northwest Passage expedition of the Pandora in 1875. He was a noted coleopterist and a Fellow of the Entomological Society.

In 1911 in Kensington, London, N. Gerald Horner married Grace Malleson Fearon (1891–1950). They had one son.
