= Make Mine Freedom =

1948 propaganda cartoon

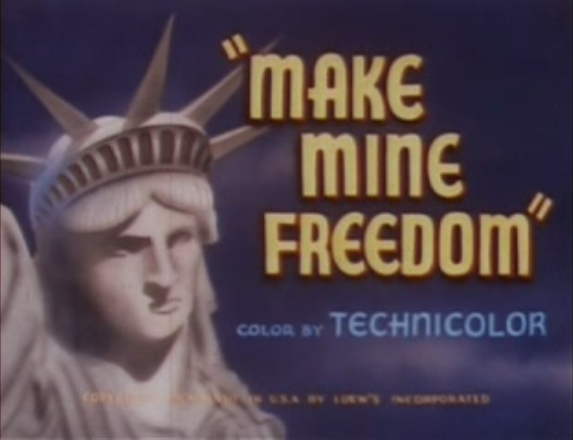
- Directed by: William Hanna; Joseph Barbera
- Produced by: John Sutherland
- Starring: Billy Bletcher; Frank Nelson; John Brown; Stan Freberg
- Narrated by: John Hiestand
- Music by: Paul Smith
- Production company: John Sutherland Productions
- Distributed by: Metro-Goldwyn-Mayer
- Release date: February 25, 1948
- Running time: 9 minutes 27 seconds
- Country: United States
- Language: English

Make Mine Freedom is a 1948 American animated anti-communist propaganda cartoon created by John Sutherland Productions for the Extension Department of Harding College (now Harding University). Financed with a grant from the Alfred P. Sloan Foundation, the cartoon was the first in a series of pro-free enterprise films produced by Sutherland for Harding. The cartoon depicts a satire of perceived life under collectivist ideology.

== Production background ==
Around 1947, the Sloan Foundation provided a grant of between $300,000 and $600,000 to Harding College to produce cartoons that promoted the American way and uplifted American business philosophy. Staff at Harding originally approached Walt Disney Productions, but were referred to John Sutherland, who left the company in 1940, shortly before the Disney animators' strike.

According to the film's original copyright entry, its original title was The Secret of American Prosperity, but this was later changed to Make Mine Freedom for the film's February 1948 release. The film debuted on February 25, 1948, and Harding president George S. Benson played the film at his inaugural Freedom Forum, a gathering of pro-business speakers, the following year.

== Plot ==
The film opens with a paean to American values, noting how America means different things to different people. The central conflict in the film concerns four composite characters, a worker, a capitalist, a politician, and a farmer, who all find themselves at odds with each other. A slick salesman approaches the men, offering them a solution to all their problems in the form of a magic tonic known as ISM, which he claims will "cure any ailment of the body politic." The bottles are labeled differently, such as "ISM for workers" offering higher wages and economic security, "ISM for farmers" offering bountiful crops and no inclement weather, and "ISM for management" disallowing strikes.

He offers the tonic to the men for free, but provides them a contract that requires them to–quite literally–sign away the freedom of themselves, their children, and their grandchildren. Upon hearing this, a sleeping man on a bench wakes up and approaches the group, announcing that he is John Q. Public. He asks to see the contract, examines it, and is astonished that the men would so readily sign away their freedoms. Public then regales the men with a tale of Joe Doakes (another generic American name), a lowly inventor in the 1890s, who became wealthy thanks to his inventions for the automotive industry. He had financial backing from his family and friends. Public explains that Doakes' success is due to the American system of free enterprise, and that being a capitalist is nothing to be ashamed of. He also notes that America enjoyed a standard of living after World War II unparalleled by any other country.

Public then invites the men to try ISM and see what its collectivist vision would allegedly bring. All four see themselves confronted by a loud voice of "The State" and a gigantic iron hand. The worker finds himself shackled to a machine and his cries that the "union will hear of this" are silenced in that there are no more unions save for one, a state-run union where membership is compulsory; the capitalist is ejected from his business as the State has nationalized it, and when he cries that he will take this to Supreme Court, the State says the judiciary now rubber stamps its dictates: "no more private property"; the farmer is also chained, where he says the State has been ordering him to cultivate crops unsuitable to this land, and as punishment for complaining, his farm is collectivized and he is stripped of his ability to vote; and the politician is sent to a labor camp where his last cries for people to unite are drowned out by the giant iron hand turning his head into a record player that spouts repetitive propaganda. Disgusted with the ISM, the men turn on the salesman and chase him out of town. The film ends with the four men following John Q. Public in a parade akin to the famous "fife and drummer" painting of the American Revolution. The five realize that ever-increasing abundance for all is the best way of ensuring American prosperity.

== Reception ==
The film found widespread adoration in Cold War America, but recent historians have criticized its propagandist nature and its subtle suggestion that communists should face mob violence.

Journalist George Sokolsky wrote favorably of the film shortly after its debut, praising the film in his syndicated column These Days. Sokolsky said that the film “explains why the United States is an excellent place in which to live—in fact a better place than those proletarian heavens that are so widely advertised by the speakers of utopias.” Sokolsky believed that the film needed to be shown in every American theatre and declared that the film “is propaganda that parents should take their children to see, because our children need to know beyond doubt [sic] that just being an American is a blessing.”

Historian Chase Winstead wrote in Invasion USA: Essays on Anti-Communist Movies of the 1950s and 1960s that "Make Mine Freedom has a serious point of view, and worse still, it's determined to make that point of view our point of view. Nicely animated (though not as fully as the MGM unit's other theatrical cartoons), it skates by on craft, while assuming that American audiences are a bunch of dummies to be gulled with visual and textual cliches that pass as wit."

In his book Paul Robeson and the Cold War Performance Complex, Tony Perucci notes that in Make Mine Freedom, "mob violence against Communist instigators is celebrated as patriotic. . .[w]ith Looney Tunes-style music, the raging mob attacks the Communist, running him out of town, as his screams fade into a patriotic fife and drum."
