= The Most Important Person =

American television series

- Genre: animated short
- Created by: Dan and Elaine Weisburd
- Opening theme: "The Most Important Person"

Production
- Running time: 3-5 minutes
- Production company: Sutherland Learning Associates

Original release
- Network: CBS, PBS
- Release: 1972 – 1975

The Most Important Person is an animation/live action series of 66 short subjects of important topics in the lives of children. They were produced in 1972 by Sutherland Learning Associates. From 1972 to 1975, these shorts were seen as part of CBS's Captain Kangaroo program.

== Production ==
The husband and wife team Dan and Elaine Weisburd were the creators behind The Most Important Person. They created, directed, wrote the stories, composed the songs, and recorded the voices for the series.

The series received funding from the United States Department of Health, Education and Welfare (HEW). According to The Encyclopedia of American Animated Television Shows, it was "the first television animation program to receive financial aid from the American federal government." A report to the United States House Committee on Appropriations stated that the series "was aimed at giving preschool children a feeling of self-assurance and a greater appreciation of their own physical well-being. The subjects covered in the series included relationships, self-concepts, feelings and attitudes, nutrition, learning and communication skills, and health." HEW provided $500,000 in funding for the series in fiscal years 1972 and 1973.

== Characters ==
The main characters were an ostrich named Fumble, the fur-covered Hairy, the loquacious Bird and two children, Mike and Nicola.

== Syndication ==
From 1975 to 1981, these shorts were later syndicated to local television stations, mostly independent stations that ran large amounts of animated cartoons and other children's programming. They also ran in the late 1970s on a few PBS stations running in-school programming. Some pre-1994 syndicated prints of The Underdog Show have also included Most Important Person shorts.

== Reception ==
A report to the United States House of Representatives Committee on Appropriations stated that "The Most Important Person" was among a group of educational television programs that "have been widely acclaimed as being excellent programs."

The series' theme song includes the line, "The most important person in the whole wide world is you." Journalist Anneli Rufus commented in her book Stuck regarding this line, "In principle, a nice heartwarming boost. In practice, overkill. A new generation was learning to look out for Number One." Tina Fey wrote in her book Bossypants, "Is this not the absolute worst thing you could instill in a child? They're the most important person? In the world? That's what they already think. You need to teach them the opposite." An Adventures in Odyssey book commented about the song, "What kind of a message is that? The most important person is you? That's not what God says. He wants us to think of others before ourselves."

== Spin-off ==
A later spin-off, The Kingdom of Could Be You, featuring the children from The Most Important Person, was also produced by Sutherland Learning Associates.
