= John Haddy James =

English physician

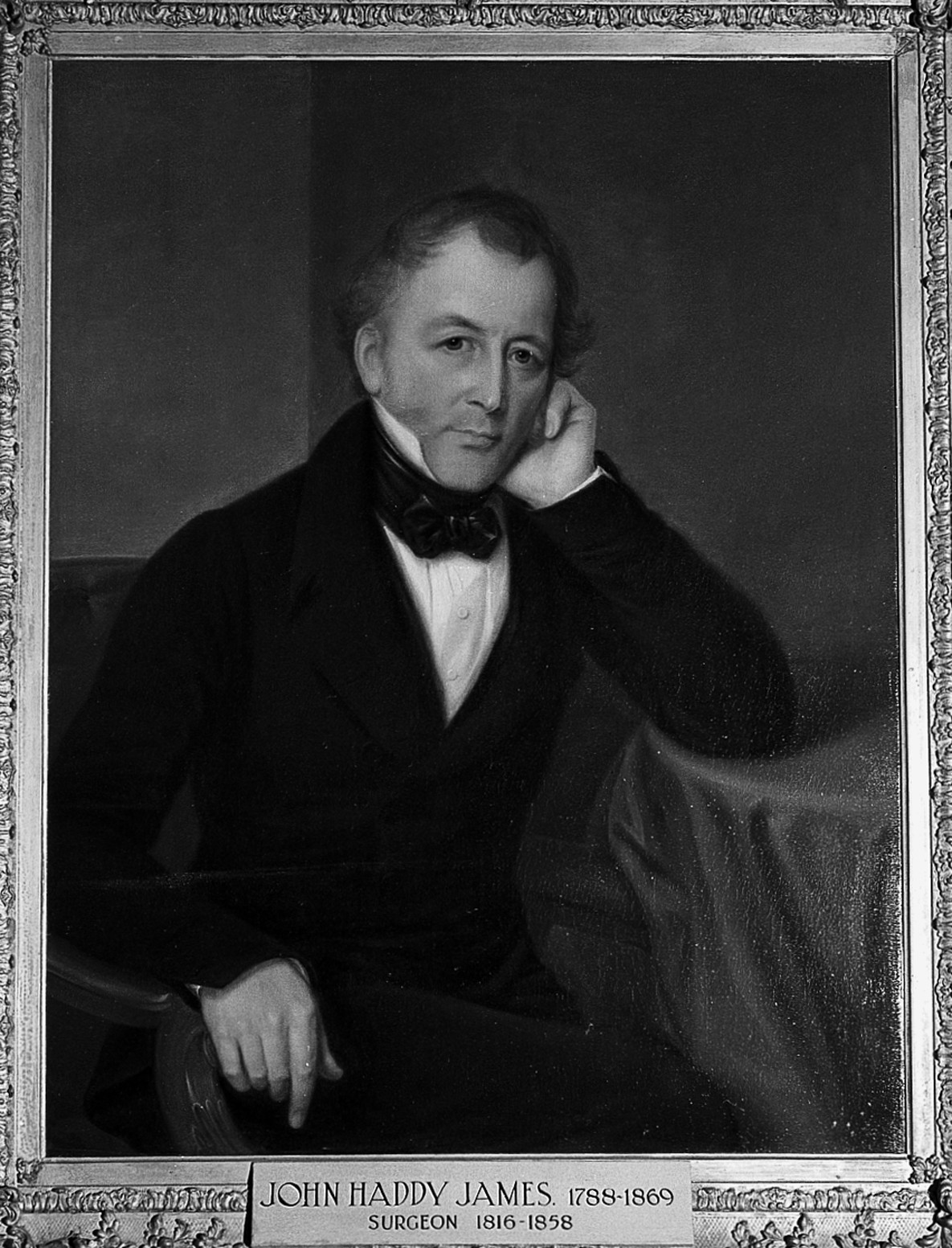
- Born: 6 July 1788; Exeter, England
- Died: 17 March 1869 (aged 80); Exeter, England
- Occupation: Physician

John Haddy James (6 July 1788 – 17 March 1869) was an English physician.

== Biography ==
James was the son of a retired Bristol merchant. He was born at Exeter on 6 July 1788. He attended the Exeter grammar school, and at sixteen was apprenticed (in 1805) to Benjamin Johnson, a surgeon, and from 1806 until 1808 to Mr. Patch, surgeon to the Devon and Exeter Hospital. From 1808 to 1812 he was a student at St. Bartholomew's Hospital, residing one of the years in Abernethy's house, and then becoming house-surgeon. He qualified M.R.C.S. in 1811, became assistant-surgeon to the 1st life-guards, and was present at Waterloo. Quitting the service in June 1816, he was elected at the same time (after two previous failures) surgeon to the Devon and Exeter Hospital, and commenced as a general practitioner in Exeter, his residence being in the Cathedral Close. At the hospital he gave lectures on anatomy and physiology, along with Barnes, and began the pathological museum, the catalogue of which occupied much of his leisure. He was a strong advocate of provincial as against exclusively metropolitan medical education, and became one of the original members of the Provincial Medical and Surgical Association. At its Liverpool meeting in 1839 he was chosen to give the retrospective address in surgery, and was made president of the Exeter meeting in 1842. He became a town councillor of Exeter in 1820, sheriff in 1826, and mayor in 1828, retiring from municipal business when the old corporation was dissolved in 1835. He was a man of great vigour, bodily and mental, dressed in the old fashion, and professed tory and staunch church principles. In professional matters he was cautious, opinionative, and conservative, a careful, although not an artistic, operator, a most assiduous note-taker (he left eleven manuscript folio volumes of cases written by himself), and gifted with a good memory, which made his large experience available. In 1843 he was nominated one of the first set of honorary fellows of the College of Surgeons under its new charter. In 1858 he resigned the surgeoncy of the Devon and Exeter Hospital (his son succeeding him), but retained until 1868 his favourite duty of curator of the museum, for which he had a house built in the grounds by private subscription in 1853. He died on 17 March 1869 at Southernhay, Exeter, after a lingering illness of five years.

James was twice married, first in 1822 to Elizabeth Wittal, who died in 1839, and again in 1840 to Harriet Hills of Exmouth, who survived him. He was the father of nine children by his first wife, only one of whom (his eldest son, a surgeon) died before him.

‘James of Exeter’ was well known in the profession at large, partly by the spread of his local fame, and partly as a writer on inflammation, and as one of the few surgeons who had tied the abdominal aorta for aneurism of the internal iliac (the patient died in less than three hours, see Med.-Chir. Trans. 1829, vol. xvi.) His writings on inflammation began in 1818, when he won the Jacksonian prize for an essay upon it, printed in 1821; 2nd edit. 1832. He constantly quoted John Hunter and Xavier Bichat, distinguished between the reparative and other effects of inflammation, and maintained that the extent of the process was limited by the quantity of plastic lymph effused. He published a number of other papers, ‘On the Results of Amputation,’ ‘On Hernia,’ ‘On the Scars after Burns,’ &c. (for complete list see Brit. Med. Journ. 1869, i. 319). His literary activity revived in his closing years (1865–9), during which he recurred to the subject of inflammation, made a qualified defence of bleeding, and wrote on ‘Chloroform versus Pain.’
