= John Sutherland (producer) =

American film producer (1910–2001)

- Born: September 11, 1910; Williston, North Dakota, U.S.
- Died: February 17, 2001 (aged 90); Van Nuys, California, U.S.
- Occupation: Film producer
- Years active: 1938–1991
- Spouse: Paula Winslowe (m. 1939; died 1996)
- Children: 4

John Elliot Sutherland (September 11, 1910 – February 17, 2001) was an American film producer.

== Biography ==
Sutherland was born on September 11, 1910, in Williston, North Dakota. His father, Ronald Duffas Sutherland, was a bank president overseeing several in North Dakota, South Dakota and Montana. However, the Dust Bowl caused the banking industry to collapse with a number of loan failures. His family moved to Great Falls, Montana to California. There, in 1937, Sutherland graduated from the University of California, Los Angeles with a bachelor's degree in politics and economics. While working as director of UCLA's drama and debate department, he met Walt Disney through a mutual acquaintance. Disney hired him on September 12, 1938, as an assistant director on Bambi (1942).

While working on the film, Sutherland was also assigned as a screenwriter. He later claimed: "While working on the screenplay, I happened to come up with the idea for the Thumper character, 'If you can't say something nice, don't say anything at all.'" Furthermore, Sutherland voiced the adult Bambi opposite his wife Paula Winslowe, who voiced Bambi's mother. Before the film's release, Sutherland left the Disney studios on September 28, 1940. A year later, Sutherland went to Washington, D.C. to serve as a director, writer, and producer for military training films. Meanwhile, he wrote a story treatment that served as the basis for Flight Command (1940).

In 1945, Sutherland founded his namesake production studio. His studio first produced the animated cartoon series Daffy Ditties for United Artists, beginning with The Cross-Eyed Bull (1945). Shortly after, Alfred P. Sloan pledged a grant through the Sloan Foundation to Harding College (now Harding University) in Searcy, Arkansas with the goal of producing a series of short films that exemplified the American way and free enterprise. Sloan initially approached Walt Disney Productions to produce the films, but Disney instead referred them to Sutherland. The series was titled Fun and Facts about American Business, with the first installment titled Make Mine Freedom (1948). The film entered production in September 1946, but after production delays, it was completed in early 1948. Seeking theatrical distribution, Harding president George S. Benson sold the film to Metro-Goldwyn-Mayer for one dollar. During the spring of 1948, it was screened in theaters, receiving a mixed audience response.

The second installment was titled Going Places (1948). However, MGM rejected to distribute the short claiming it had "insufficient entertainment value". Sloan then suggested distributing the film through schools and other educational institutions through Harding College. This release plan was implemented for subsequent films if rejected by MGM, in which Harding College partnered with the distribution company Modern Talking Pictures. Most notably, John Sutherland Productions released the short Fresh Laid Plans (1951), which raised political controversy as it satirized the proposed Brannan Plan. However, Sutherland denied this, stating it was an "attempt to point out the impossibility of planning our lives from a central authority."

Aside from the Sloan Foundation, Sutherland Productions contracted with other industrial corporations to sponsor their short films, including General Electric, United Fruit, American Telephone & Telegraph, Du Pont Motors, and the New York Stock Exchange. In 1952, MGM replaced their sales manager W. F. Rodgers with Charles M. Reagan, who declined to distribute their latest films Dear Uncle (1952) and The Devil and John Q (1952). Despite multiple re-edits, Benson blamed Sutherland claiming he had made the shorts more political than educational. Subsequently, Sutherland and Arnold J. Zurcher, the executive director for the Sloan Foundation, negotiated over the cost of future films but it ended in a stalemate.

Throughout the 1950s, John Sutherland Productions had attracted top animation talents, including Frank Armitage, Victor Haboush, Bill Melendez, Maurice Noble, Bill Scott, Frank Tashlin, and Carl Urbano. In 1959, Sutherland released the short film Rhapsody of Steel in collaboration with the U.S. Steel, with an instrumental score by Dimitri Tiomkin and the Pittsburgh Symphony. The film's art direction was done by Eyvind Earle, who had recently finished Sleeping Beauty (1959) and joined the studio. A review in Time magazine called Sutherland "a slick entertainer and a painless pedagogue", but noted "the picture's pace is brisk, its tricks of animation are better than cute, and the plug, when the sponsor slips it in on the final frame, is modestly understated."

During the 1960s, Sutherland founded Sutherland Learning Associates. In 1972, Sutherland produced The Most Important Person short films for the Head Start program that later aired on CBS's Captain Kangaroo. A spin-off series titled The Kingdom of Could Be You also aired on the program. In 1991, Sutherland closed down his studio. His final project was a proposed series of films about gaining confidence through knowledge. The project was funded but was never completed.

== Personal life and death ==
While in Los Angeles, Sutherland married Paula Winslowe on September 16, 1939, and had four children. He was a registered Republican.

Sutherland died on February 17, 2001, in his house in Van Nuys, at the age of 90. He was survived by his two sons and one daughter.

== Selected filmography ==
=== Live-action ===
==== Theatrical ====
- Too Many Winners (1947)
- Lady at Midnight (1948)

==== Television ====
- The Most Important Person (1972−1975)

=== Animation ===
==== Theatrical ====
- Bambi (1942) as Adult Bambi
- The Cross-Eyed Bull (1945) (Daffy Dittys short)
- The Flying Jeep (1945) (Daffy Dittys short)
- The Lady Said No (1946) (Daffy Dittys short)
- Choo Choo Amigo (1946) (Daffy Ditties short)
- Pepito's Serenade (1946) (Daffy Ditties short)
- The Traitor Within (1946)
- The Fatal Kiss (1947) (Daffy Ditties short)
- Chiquita Banana (1947−1949 commercial shorts)
- Make Mine Freedom (1948)
- Going Places (1948)
- Why Play Leap Frog? (1949)
- Meet King Joe (1949)
- Albert in Blunderland (1950)
- Inside Cackle Corners (1951)
- Fresh Laid Plans (1951)
- Career for Two (1951)
- Duck and Cover (1952)
- What Makes Us Tick (1952)
- Dear Uncle (1952)
- The Devil and John Q (1952)
- A Is for Atom (1953)
- It Never Rains Oil (1953)
- It's Everybody's Business (1954)
- Man-Made Miracles (1954)
- Destination Earth (1956)
- Bananas? Si, Señor! (1956)
- The Living Circle (1956)
- Breath of Life (1956)
- Living Unlimited (1956)
- Your Safety First (1956)
- The Dragon Slayer (1956)
- The Littlest Giant (1957)
- Working Dollars (1957)
- The Story of Creative Capital (1957)
- Fill 'Er Up (1959)
- Rhapsody of Steel (1959)
- Curtain Time (1960)
- Tomorrow and Mr. Jones (1960)
- A Missile Named Mac (1962)
- The Owl Who Gave a Hoot (1967)

== Bibliography ==
- Jack, Caroline (2015). "Fun and Facts about American Business: Economic Education and Business Propaganda in an Early Cold War Cartoon Series". Enterprise & Society. 16 (3): 491–520. doi:10.1017/eso.2014.37. JSTOR 26567932.
