= Provincial Medical and Surgical Association =

19th-century predecessor of the British Medical Association

The Provincial Medical and Surgical Association (PMSA) was founded by Sir Charles Hastings on 19 July 1832 at a meeting in the Board Room of the Worcester Infirmary. It was initially established for the sharing of scientific and medical knowledge. This is now the site of the University of Worcester's City Campus. An audience of 50 doctors was present to hear Hastings propose the inauguration of an Association both friendly and scientific for the sharing of knowledge between doctors. Ten years after its initial meeting the association's membership had grown to 1,350 and it had begun to publish a weekly journal, The Provincial Medical and Surgical Journal. In 1853 the PMSA extended its membership to London doctors and 1856 transformed itself into the British Medical Association.

== The Provincial Medical and Surgical Journal ==
The Provincial Medical and Surgical Journal (PMAJ) was launched in London on 3 October 1840 under the editorship of Drs. Peter Hennis Green and Robert James Nicholl Streeten.

On 3 April 1844 the Journal was relaunched as a new series devoted entirely to the interests of PMSA, and published under the control of its officers and Council, and the editorship of Dr. Streeten, the secretary of the Association.

The journal was merged with the Association Medical Journal and appeared as the British Medical Journal from 1857.
