= James Yearsley =

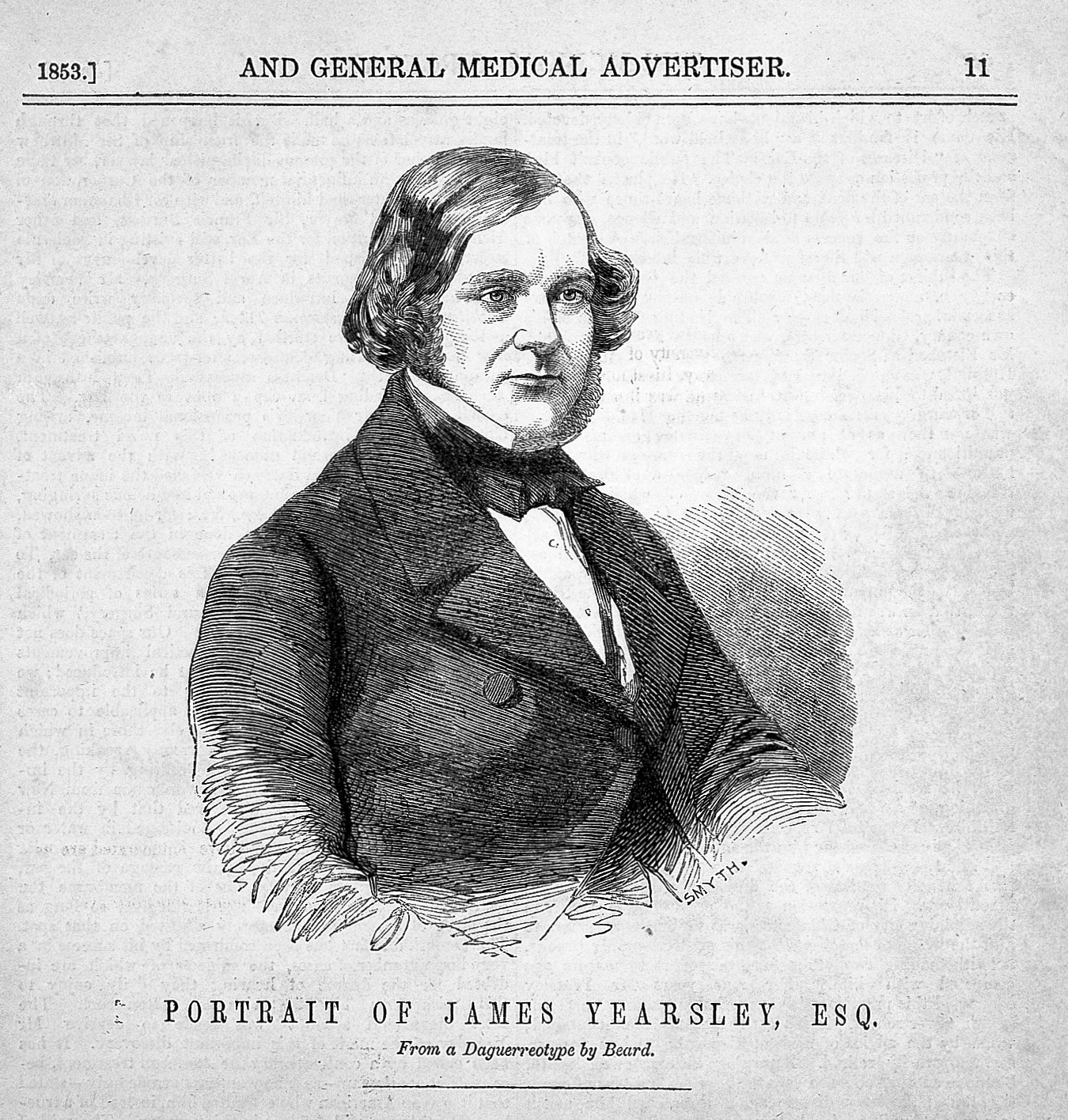
- Born: 17 May 1805; Cheltenham, Gloucestershire, England
- Died: 9 July 1869 (aged 64); Savile Row, London, England
- Occupation: Aural Surgeon

James Yearsley (1805–1869), Aural Surgeon, was born on May 17, 1805 to a hard working, north-country family who had settled in Cheltenham.

== Medical career ==
Adopting a medical career, he became a pupil of Ralph Fletcher of Gloucester, (a surgeon of considerable eminence in his profession, and of some note as a collector of pictures), and later married his daughter. Yearsley moved to London, where he entered himself a student at St. Bartholomew's Hospital. He was admitted a member of the Royal College of Surgeons of England and a licentiate of the Society of Apothecaries in 1827; later in life he added to these qualifications the licentiateship of the Royal College of Physicians, Edinburgh (1860), and he graduated M.D. at St. Andrews University in 1862.

After practising for a short time in Cheltenham, he established himself about 1829 as a general practitioner at Ross in Herefordshire. He removed to London about 1837, and started to practise as an aural surgeon. He opened an institution for the relief of diseases of the ear in Sackville Street, Piccadilly, and in 1846 he became surgeon to the Royal Society of Musicians. He founded a hospital specialising in the diseases of the ear, the Metropolitan Ear Nose and Throat Hospital in Kensington.

Yearsley deserves recognition as one who assisted in bringing aural surgery out of the degraded position it held at the beginning of the 19th century. He insisted strongly upon the connection between deafness and disease of the naso-pharynx. At first he practised freely the removal of the tonsils as an aid to recovery from deafness, but in later life experience led him to modify his views, and he performed tonsillectomy much less often. Yearsley learnt, too, the value of an artificial tympanum in the relief of certain forms of deafness, and he very justly recommended the use of the simplest form of film in preference to the more complex tympana employed by some of his contemporaries.

Yearsley was less scientific than either George Pilcher or Joseph Toynbee, and, though original in his views and bold in expressing his opinions, he too often spoilt his cause by his controversial temperament.

== As a publisher ==
He was the originator and proprietor of the Medical Circular from 1852 until it was consolidated with the Dublin Medical Press in January 1866. Jointly with two other members of his profession, Dr. Tyler Smith and Dr. Forbes Benignus Winslow, he founded the ‘'Medical Directory'’, becoming its sole proprietor on the retirement of his two partners.

=== Published works ===
Yearsley's works were:

1. ‘Improved Methods of treating Diseases of the Ear,’ London, 1840, 12mo.
2. ‘Contributions to Aural Surgery,’ London, 1841, 12mo.
3. ‘Stammering,’ &c., London, 1841, 8vo; 3rd edit. 1841.
4. ‘A Treatise on Enlarged Tonsils,’ London, 1842, 8vo; 3rd edit. 1848.
5. ‘On Throat Deafness,’ London, 1853, 8vo; 2nd edit. 1868.
6. ‘Deafness Practically Illustrated,’ London, 1854, 12mo.

== Death ==
Yearsley died at his house in Savile Row, London, on 9 July 1869, and was buried at Sutton Bonnington, in Nottinghamshire.

== References and Sources ==
Attribution

This article incorporates text from a publication now in the public domain: Lee, Sidney, ed. (1900). "Yearsley, James". Dictionary of National Biography. Vol. 63. London: Smith, Elder & Co.
