= Dawson Williams =

British physician and medical editor (1854–1928)

Sir Dawson Williams
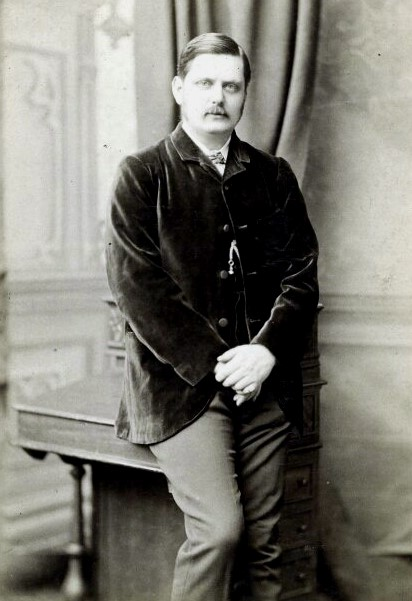
- Dawson Williams on a cabinet card, c. 1885.
- Born: 17 July 1854; Ulleskelf, Yorkshire, England
- Died: 27 February 1928 (aged 73); Bourne End, Buckinghamshire, England
- Resting place: Little Marlow Cemetery, Marlow, Buckinghamshire
- Education: University College London
- Scientific career
- Fields: Paediatrics

Sir Dawson Williams CBE FRCP (17 July 1854 – 27 February 1928) was a British physician and the longest serving editor of the British Medical Journal (BMJ).

He gave up his medical practice to edit the BMJ and published influential studies into "mental healing" and bogus medications that exposed numerous preparations as "valueless" and containing only minute quantities of what was claimed. He retired in 1928 after thirty years of editorship.

== Early life and education ==
Dawson Williams was born in Ulleskelf, Yorkshire, on 17 July 1854 to the reverend John Mack Williams, previously the rector of Burnby and of Irish and Welsh descent, and his wife Ellen Monsarrat, of Spanish and Huguenot descent. He was the eldest son of seven children, and educated at Pocklington Grammar School, subsequently going on to University College London (UCL) to study arts.

He stayed on at UCL to study medicine, graduating in 1878, and then taking up junior posts at UCL, the Victoria Hospital for Children and the Brompton Hospital. At one time, he aspired to join the Indian Medical Service, but changed direction to paediatrics.

In 1882, he married Catherine (died 1917), daughter of the Scottish land-owner Robert Kirkpatrick-Howat, and they had one daughter.

== Career ==
After ten years as physician to the East London Hospital for Children from 1884, Williams became full physician and then consultant.

He met his lifelong friend, Herbert R. Spencer at UCL, which consequently established a close tie between UCL and the BMJ. Spencer ultimately followed Williams to Harley Street, and Williams frequently published works by Spencer.

He wrote several articles including contributions to Clifford Allbutt’s System of Medicine, and in 1898, he published Medical Diseases of Infancy and Childhood. He was closely connected with the British Medical Journal throughout his career, being first a reporter, then principal sub-editor, and then assistant editor in 1895. He succeeded the editor, Ernest Hart, in 1898, following which he gave up much of his clinical practice, ultimately leaving it completely from 1902 to dedicate his whole time to the journal's editorship which he held for thirty years.

In 1904, Dawson commissioned Edward Harrison, a renowned pharmacist, to analyse the contents of a variety of proprietary drugs. The results, including the drug costs, were published in a series of articles that lasted until 1908, and exposed numerous medications as "valueless" and containing only minute quantities of what was claimed. Some of this work was reproduced in 1909 in Secret Remedies. What they Cost and What they Contain, which sold more than 60,000 copies within two years. A follow-up, More Secret Remedies (1912), was published but was less successful.

Some of his other BMJ editorial activities included publishing a series of specially commissioned articles on "mental healing", where significant contributions came from eminent medical professionals including Clifford Allbutt, Henry Morris, H. T. Butlin, and William Osler.

In 1917, he was succeeded as editor of the BMJ by Norman Gerald Horner, who had been his assistant.

== Later life ==
In 1919, he received the CBE. In 1921 he was knighted and also awarded the gold medal of merit of the British Medical Association.

During the last two decades of his life he suffered from the after-effects of a car accident and later from bronchitis and heart failure. He died on 27 February 1928, at his home near Bourne End, Buckinghamshire.

== Selected publications ==
- Medical Diseases of Infancy and Childhood. Cassell, London, 1898. (Second edition 1900 by Frank Spooner Churchill)
