= Medical Press and Circular =

Irish medical publication (1866–1961)

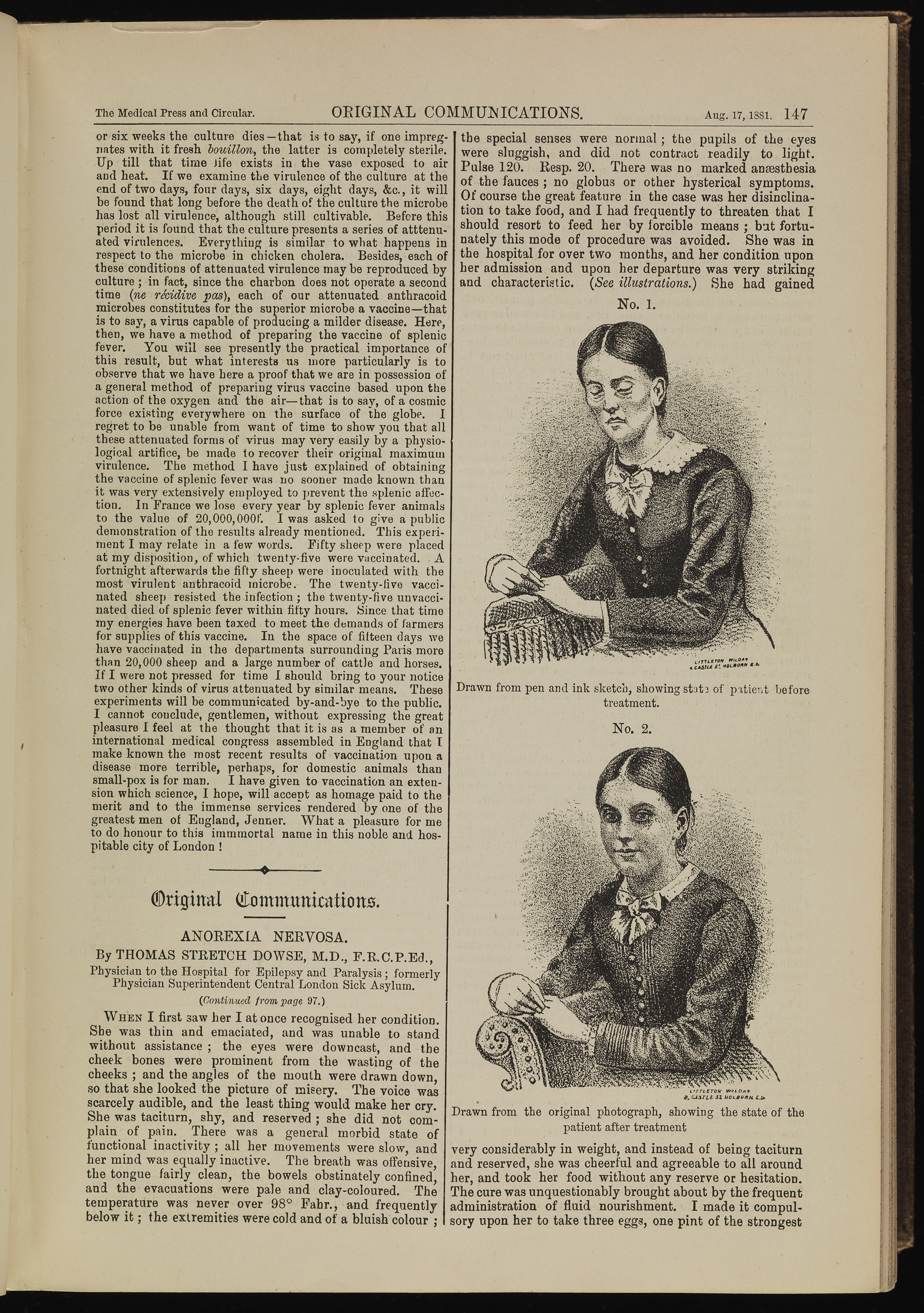
An entry from the 17 August 1881 edition of The Medical Press and Circular

Medical Press and Circular was a medical publication from Dublin, Ireland. It was established in 1866 with the merger of the Dublin Medical Press and the Medical Circular. Its masthead featured a Latin language version of the Cicero motto Salus Populi Suprema Lex ("the health of the people shall be the supreme law"). It ceased publication in 1961.

== Foundation ==
The Dublin Medical Press was a weekly medical publication established in 1839 by Arthur Jacob. Claiming to be the first publication of its kind in Ireland, its first issue contained veiled criticism of The Lancet's Erinensis column, pseudonymously written by an Irish doctor. It was co-edited by Jacob and his colleague Henry Maunsell, and was published by Fannin and Company in Dublin. After 3 months, circulation had reached 3,000 copies per week. Each edition was 16 pages in length and cost 6d (Irish pennies).

== Contents ==
The Press contained medical and scientific articles, as well as letters, news, and professional notices. On 12 March 1845, Francis Rynd published his article on his invention of the modern hypodermic needle in the Dublin Medical Press. In 1860, Arthur Jacob's son, Archibald Jacob, was appointed as editor and the publication increased in size to 22 pages. When a patient accused renowned eye surgeon William Wilde (father of Oscar Wilde) of rape in 1864–1865, the Press suffered criticism from the medical community for its coverage of the case. The Press became known for its opposition to pseudoscience and in 1865 published a list of 18 Irish and British newspapers which had agreed to refuse advertising of quackery. The publication challenged the logical fallacy of argument from authority, stating that "mere appeal to authority alone had better be avoided". The Press encouraged the acceptance of women in medicine, commending Eleanora Fleury who became the first female graduate of the Royal University of Ireland as well as graduating first in her class. The Press also argued against segregation of male and female medical students.

== Later years ==
In 1865, the title became Medical Press. It was soon purchased by James Yearsley and in January 1866 merged with his Medical Circular to become the Dublin Medical Press and Circular. In 1867, it was again renamed to Medical Press and Circular. In 1868, publication moved to Albert Alfred Tindall in London. Its focus moved away from Irish medicine and was sometimes referred to as the London Medical Press and Circular, although it continued to publish a dedicated Irish supplement . It maintained links with the Irish Medical Association until 1935, when it became the Irish Free State Medical Union. Archibald Jacob continued as editor of Medical Press and Circular until his death in 1901.
