= Infant Welfare Society of Chicago =

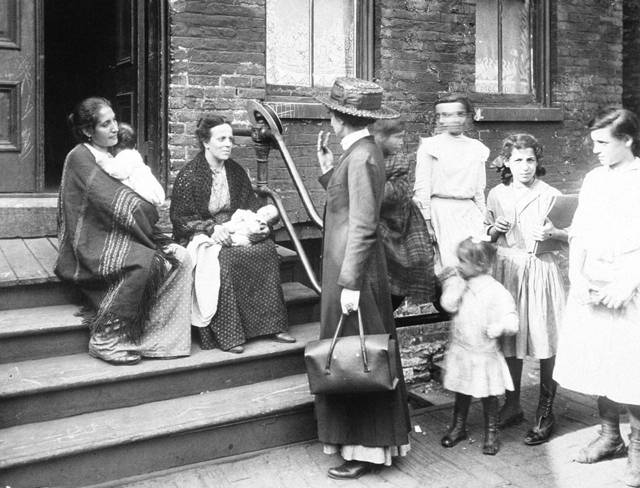
A nurse of the Infant Welfare Society of Chicago talks with mothers of infants in 1911.

The Infant Welfare Society of Chicago promotes the welfare of infants in the Chicago area of the United States. It was established in 1911 by the staff and volunteers of the Chicago Milk Commission.
