= Haddy Dandeh-Jabbie =

Gambian lawyer and women's rights activist

- Education: Bournemouth University; University of Westminster
- Occupations: lawyer, human rights activist, women's and children's rights activist

Haddy Dandeh-Jabbie also known as Haddy Dandeh is a Gambian women's rights activist, public speaker and lawyer who is well known for advocating for the women and children rights in Gambia. She currently serves as the President of the Female Lawyers Association of the Gambia (FLAG).

== Career ==
She obtained her Bachelor of Law from the Bournemouth University and received her Master of Law in 1998 from the University of Westminster in England. She also obtained her degree of utter barrister from the Sierra Leone Law School. Haddy has been a legal practitioner since 2001 and has been highly regarded for being one of the successful lawyer in Gambia. She also worked in the legal department of the Gambian mobile operator Comium in the legal as well as human resource department.

In October 2011, she was appointed as the vice president of the Female Lawyers Association of the Gambia. In 2015, she was part of the board of directors of Think Young Women organisation and in June 2017 became a prominent board member of ActionAid which is an international non-governmental organisation. In February 2016, she was promoted to the position as the President of the Female Lawyers Association of the Gambia succeeding Neneh Cham. She was appointed as the deputy lead counsel of Gambia by the Attorney General in January 2020.
