= John Francis Sutherland =

Dr John Francis Sutherland FRSE FRSS (1854–1912) was a Scottish physician, linked to senior civil service medical roles. His booklet "First Aid to Injured and Sick" was a best seller throughout the 20th century.

== Life ==
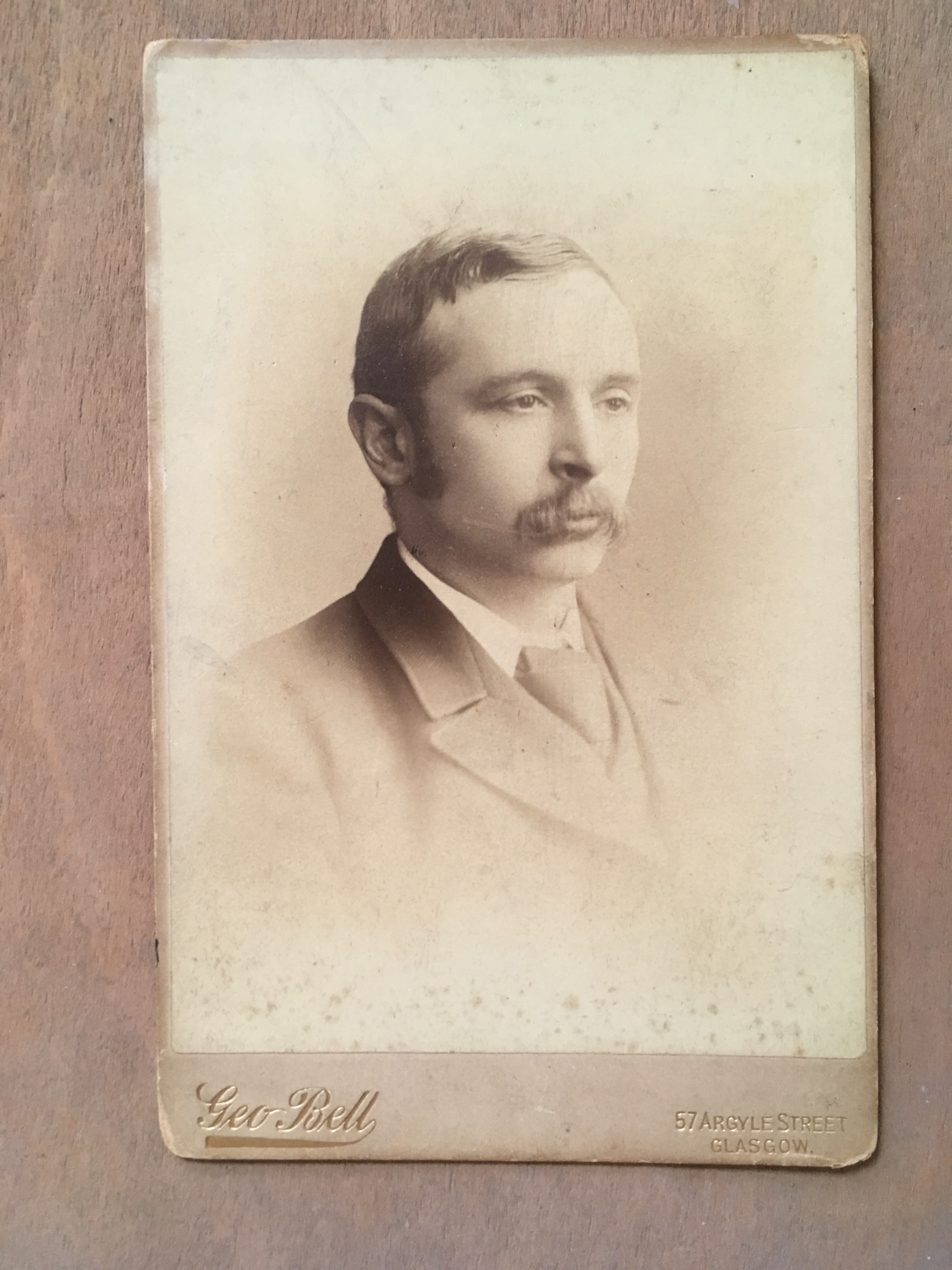
Dr J.F. Sutherland

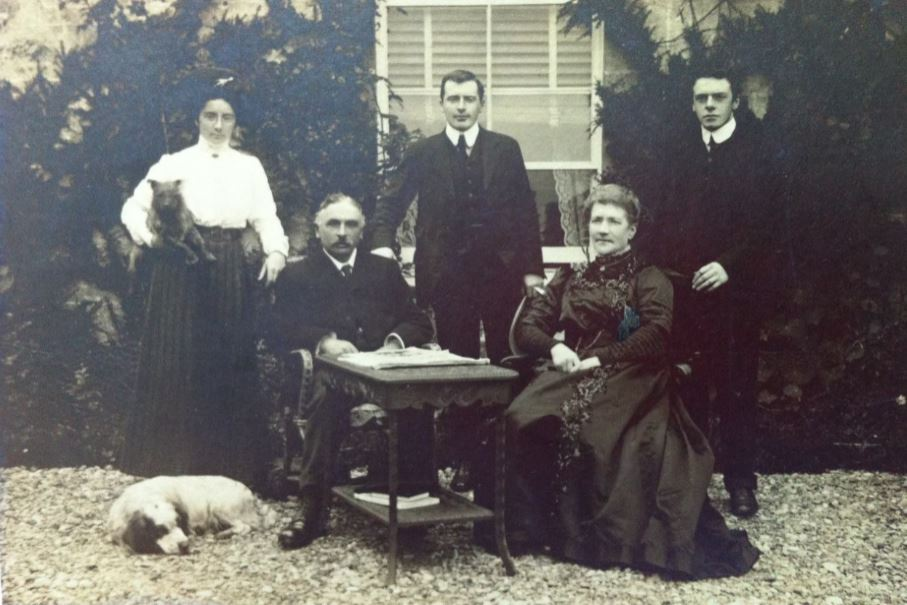
The Sutherland family in 1910. L to R: Joan, John Francis, Halliday, Jane, Francis (Dogs: Daddles (lying on ground) and Wasp (held by Joan))

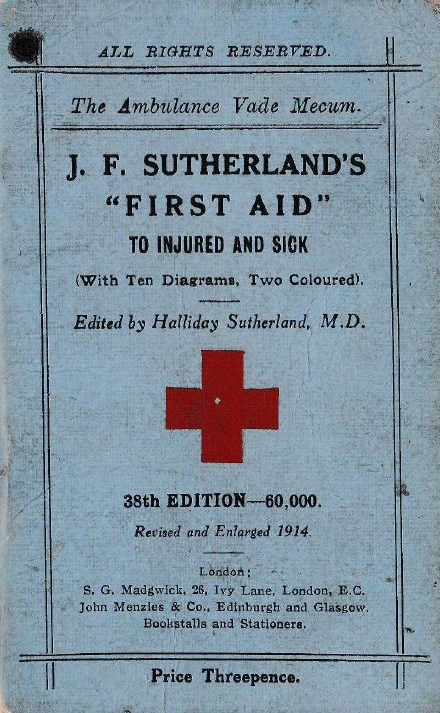
J.F. S First Aid to Injured and Sick

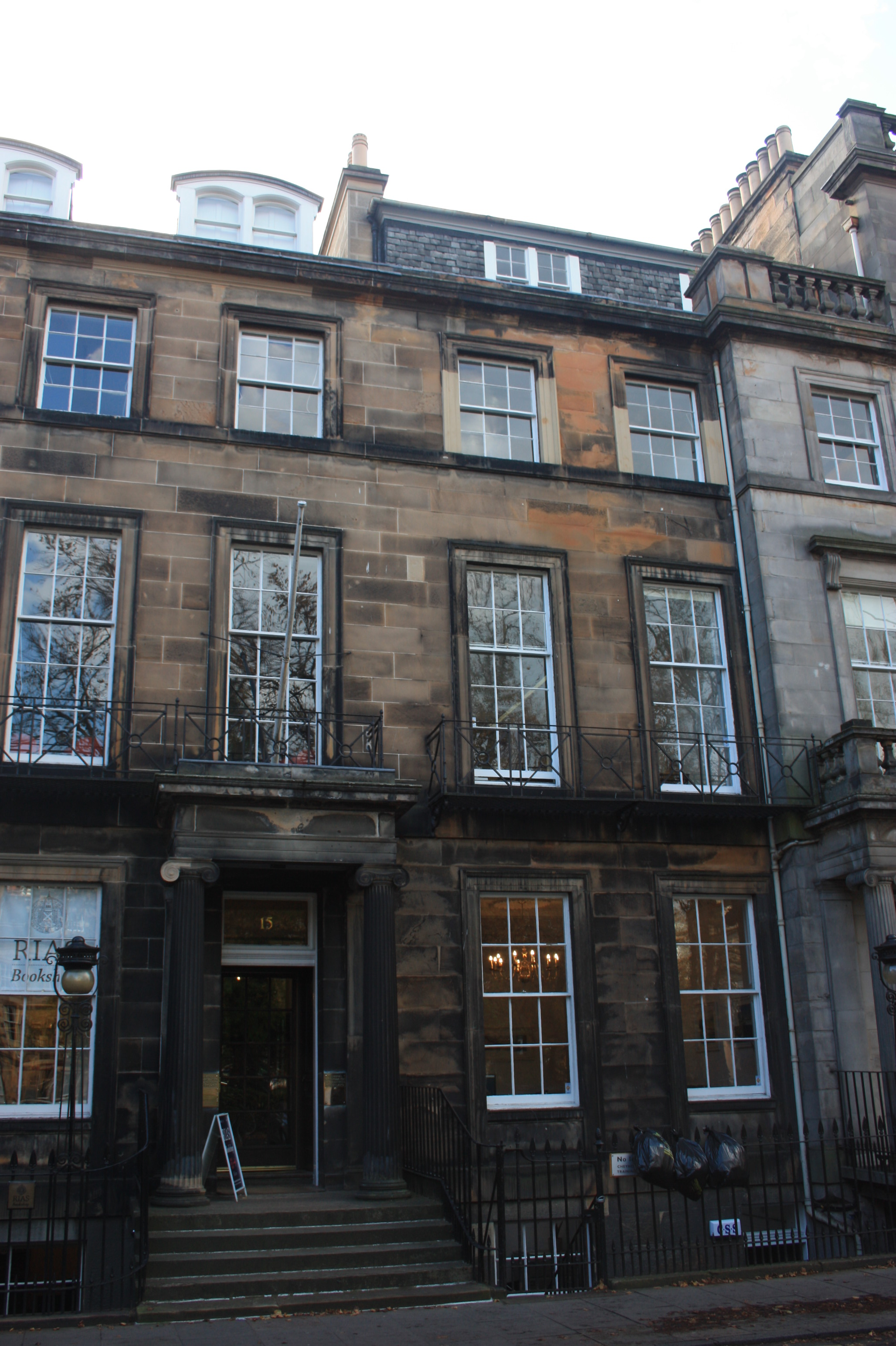
15 Rutland Square, Edinburgh

He was born in Lybster in Caithness in 1854. He studied medicine at the University of Edinburgh under Joseph Lister, graduating with an MB ChB around 1874. He did further postgraduate studies in Glasgow and Paris.

His first role was as Deputy Medical Officer on HMS Mars, a Royal Navy training ship in 1874. He then became Resident Medical Officer in the British Hospital in Paris, working with Sir John Rose Cormack, Edward Neech and Alan Herbert.

In 1880 he gained his doctorate (MD) and entered a new role as Medical Officer to HM Prisons, living at 19 Roslea Drive in the Dennistoun district of Glasgow, which was then a newly built tenemental flat. In 1897 he was promoted to Consulting Medical Officer for the newly constructed Barlinnie Prison. Working in this environment he gained a knowledge of insanity, inebriety and criminology. He served on the Committee for Habitual Offenders and Inebriates and did much to push for penal reform.

In 1896 he was elected a Fellow of the Royal Society of Edinburgh. His proposers were Sir Andrew Douglas Maclagan, Sir Arthur Mitchell, John Sibbald and Sir John Halliday Croom.

In 1895 he moved to Edinburgh as Deputy Commissioner of Lunacy (based at Craig House) initially living at 4 Merchiston Bank Avenue and later moving to 3 Moston Terrace in the Mayfield district.

He died at 15 Rutland Square in Edinburgh's West End, his home for his final years, in January 1912 aged 57. He is buried with his ancestors at Kildary in Easter Ross.

== Family and Private Life ==
He was married to Jane MacKay, daughter of John MacKay of Caithness, a Free Church minister. Their children were Halliday Sutherland, Francis Sutherland and Joan Sutherland. Halliday Sutherland's best-selling autobiography "The Arches of the Years" included recollections of his father in chapters entitled "The Terror of the Glen" and "Death on the Moors".

A keen church-goer he was a Deacon in the United Free Church of Scotland.

== Publications ==
- Hospitals: Their History, Construction and Hygiene (1880)
- The Insane in Private Dwellings and Licensed Houses (1897)
- Ambulance Vade Mecum: First Aid to Injured and Sick (running to at least 40 editions 1904 to 1957)
- Jurisprudence of Intoxication
- Recidivism: Habitual Criminality and Habitual Petty Deliquency (1908)
