= John Hiestand (actor) =

American actor (1907–1987)

- Born: January 16, 1907; Madison, Wisconsin, U.S.
- Died: February 5, 1987 (aged 80); Newport Beach, California, U.S.
- Occupation: Actor
- Spouse(s): Jeane Wood (1936-1952); Jeane McGee (1953-1987)
- Children: 2

John "Bud" Hallam Hiestand, also known as Bud Hallam (January 16, 1907 – February 5, 1987) was an American actor and announcer. He began his career acting on radio in the early 1930s and soon also began work as an announcer in shows and commercials. During World War II, he worked for the U.S. Office of War Information, becoming chief of theater operations in the southwest Pacific. After the war, he continued to appear as a radio announcer, but also acted in films and TV series from the 1930s to the 1980s, sometimes in the roles of narrator or radio or TV announcer.

== Early life ==
Hiestand was born in Madison, Wisconsin in 1907. He graduated from Stanford University with a BA in political science in 1930.

== Career ==
Hiestand started his career in radio in 1933, appearing first on station KHJ as an actor in a program called Catherine the Great, and soon became an announcer with station KFI. In 1936, he was described in the Los Angeles Times as "the blond Norse god of KFI-KECA". He also appeared on radio programs broadcast by Don Ameche, Al Jolson, Harriet Hilliard and Ozzie Nelson, and in such shows as Feg Murray's The Baker's Broadcast, Amos 'n' Andy and The Fred Allen Show. He recorded commercial advertisements for radio and TV, including during Rudy Vallée's radio program. In 1938, a columnist in the Los Angeles Daily News gave Hiestand an "honorable mention for doing a swell job of selling the sponsor's stuff ... [his] chores on the Vallee radioshow are pleasing to the ears ... simple, but effective commercials." In 1942, a reviewer wrote that he "made a splendid appearance on the stage" as announcer for a live performance by The Hour of Charm All-Girl Orchestra.

During World War II, Hiestand served in the U.S. Office of War Information producing The Philippine Hour, and he became chief of theater operations in the southwest Pacific. After the war, he appeared as the announcer in further radio shows like Kay Kyser's Kollege of Musical Knowledge, The Great Gildersleeve, The Mel Blanc Show, and Meet Corliss Archer.

He appeared in many films from the 1930s to the 1980s, often in the roles of narrator or radio or TV announcer. He also appeared in many TV series, including Gangbusters, The Public Defender, Telephone Time, Frontier Doctor, Surfside 6, Hazel, Bewitched, The Bold Ones, Temperatures Rising and The Waltons.

== Personal life ==
Hiestand married actress and writer Jeane Wood, daughter of film director Sam Wood, in 1936. They adopted a daughter in 1939. They divorced in 1952, and he married actress Jeane McGee in 1953. They had one daughter, and this marriage lasted until his death in 1987. Hiestand had a brother, Bob, who worked as a sound-effects engineer, and a sister, Betty, who was married to Glann Heisch, a radio producer. Hiestand collected world maps, and had over 800 in 1940.

== Filmography ==
=== Film ===
- Source
- Two Against the World (1936) - Radio Announcer 1 (uncredited)
- Stage Struck (1936) - Radio Announcer (uncredited)
- Black Legion (1937) - First Radio Announcer Breaking Story (uncredited)
- Mountain Justice (1937) - Radio Announcer at Ruth's Trial (uncredited)
- A Day at the Races (1937) - Radio Announcer (uncredited)
- The Singing Marine (1937) - Amateur Hour Radio Announcer (uncredited)
- Mr. Dodd Takes the Air (1937) - 3rd Radio Announcer (uncredited)
- Reported Missing! (1937) - Radio Announcer (uncredited)
- The Perfect Specimen (1937) - Radio Commentator (uncredited)
- Navy Blue and Gold (1937) - Commentator 1 (uncredited)
- Big Town Girl (1937) - Announcer (uncredited)
- Missing Witnesses (1937) - Radio Announcer (uncredited)
- Love and Hisses (1937) - Radio Announcer (uncredited)
- Man-Proof (1938) - Radio Reporter in Ring (uncredited)
- Happy Landing (1938) - Announcer (uncredited)
- Daredevil Drivers (1938) - KFWB Announcer (uncredited)
- A Slight Case of Murder (1938) - Radio Commentator (uncredited)
- Over the Wall (1938) - Radio Announcer at Governor's Broadcast (uncredited)
- Sinners in Paradise (1938) - Land Operator (uncredited)
- Kentucky Moonshine (1938) - Radio Announcer
- The Fighting Devil Dogs (1938) - Newscaster (voice, uncredited)
- Cowboy from Brooklyn (1938) - Rodeo Announcer (uncredited)
- Garden of the Moon (1938) - Nightclub Announcer (uncredited)
- Broadway Musketeers (1938) - Radio News Announcer (uncredited)
- Kentucky (1938) - Derby Radio Announcer (uncredited)
- I'm from Missouri (1939) - Announcer (not confirmed)
- Women in the Wind (1939) - Cleveland Radio Announcer (uncredited)
- Wyoming Outlaw (1939) - Broadcaster (uncredited)
- The House of Fear (1939) - Radio Broadcaster (uncredited)
- Second Fiddle (1939) - Radio Announcer
- The Man Who Wouldn't Talk (1940) - (uncredited)
- The Man I Married (1940) - American Broadcaster (uncredited)
- The Great Profile (1940) - Announcer (voice, uncredited)
- I Wanted Wings (1941) - Radio Announcer
- Rise and Shine (1941) - Announcer
- Louisiana Purchase (1941) - Radio Announcer (uncredited)
- Remember the Day (1941) - Radio Announcer (uncredited)
- My Favorite Blonde (1942) - Announcer (voice, uncredited)
- The Pride of the Yankees (1942) - Announcer (uncredited)
- Henry Aldrich, Editor (1942) - Announcer (uncredited)
- King of the Mounties (1942) - Lane
- The Meanest Man in the World (1943) - Announcer (uncredited)
- Riding High (1943) - Commentator (uncredited)
- True to Life (1943) - Narrator (uncredited)
- The Hucksters (1947) - Radio Announcer (uncredited)
- Make Mine Freedom (1948) - Narrator (voice, uncredited)
- Going Places (1948) - Narrator (uncredited)
- Meet King Joe (1949) - Narrator (voice)
- The Stratton Story (1949) - Ball Player with Bill Dickey (uncredited)
- You're My Everything (1949) - Announcer (uncredited)
- Mister 880 (1950) - Narrator (voice, uncredited)
- The Day the Earth Stood Still (1951) - TV Announcer on Truck (uncredited)
- The Pride of St. Louis (1952) - Announcer (uncredited)
- The Glass Web (1953) - Announcer
- Hell and High Water (1954) - American Announcer (uncredited)
- Good Morning, Miss Dove (1955) - Prison Guard (uncredited)
- The Square Jungle (1955) - Ring Announcer (uncredited)
- Ransom! (1956) - TV Announcer (uncredited)
- World Without End (1956) - TV Newscaster (uncredited)
- The Incredible Shrinking Man (1957) - KIRL TV Newscaster (uncredited)
- The Courtship of Eddie's father (1963) - Announcer (uncredited)
- The Man from Button Willow (1965) - Old Salt . Montgomerey Blaine (voice)
- Sergeant Deadhead (1965) - John Hiestand - Newscaster
- The Steagle (1971) - Matt Mayhew
- It's an Adventure, Charlie Brown (1983) - Announcer (voice, uncredited)

=== Television ===
- Gangbusters - The Dennis Case (1952) TV Episode....Lt. John Winters
- The Public Defender - Eight Out of a Hundred (1955) TV Episode....Dunsmore
- Our Miss Brooks - Here Is Your Past (1955) TV Episode....Jeff Cartwright
- My Little Margie - Margie's Elopement (1955) TV Episode....Private Detective
- Big Town - Out on Parole (1955) TV Episode....Governor Ryan
- The Man Behind the Badge - The Case of the Deadly Homburg (1955) TV Episode....Harry
- Waterfront - The Hideout (1955) TV Episode....Sam Jordan
- Telephone Time - Felix the Fourth (1956) TV Episode....uncredited
- How to Marry a Millionaire - The Three Pretenders (1957) TV Episode....Admiral
- M Squad - Killer in Town (1957) TV Episode....Police Driver
- The Life and Legend of Wyatt Earp - Siege at Little Alamo (1957) TV Episode....Mr. Jones - Woman Trouble (1957) TV Episode....Brother Dolph
- Alcoa Presents One Step Beyond - Night of April 14th (1959) TV Episode....Drunk
- Frontier Doctor - Man to Man (1959) TV Episode....Sheriff Beal
- Bachelor Father - Bentley and the Revolving Housekeepers (1957) TV Episode....Poker Pal 2 - Bentley and the Social Worker (1958) TV Episode....Poker Pal 1 - A Sister for Kelly (1958) TV Episode....Man 2 - Woman of the House (1958) TV Episode....Mr. Richardson - Peter Falls in Love (1958) TV Episode....Hal - Parent's Night (1958) TV Episode....Man - Bentley and the Teenage Siren (1958) TV Episode....Herb - A Phone for Kelly (1959) TV Episode....Ted - Bentley the Proud Father (1959) TV Episode....Committee Member - Kelly's Idol (1959) TV Episode....Harry
- The Texan - Showdown at Abilene (1959) TV Episode....Cain Mathews
- Leave It to Beaver - Wally, the Lifeguard (1960) TV Episode....Mr. Burton
- Surfside 6 - Anniversary Special (1962) TV Episode....Henry Tewksbury
- Room for One More - A Trip to the Beach (1962) TV Episode....Jason - Strength Through Money (1962) TV Episode....Jason - Love Thy Neighbor (1962) TV Episode....Jason - Our Man in Brazil (1962) TV Episode....Jason - What Is It? (1962) TV Episode....Mr. Jason - Danger: Man at Work (1962) TV Episode....Jason
- Grindl - The Ghastly Honeymoon (1963) TV Episode....Rev. Carstairs
- The Funny Company
- The Donna Reed Show - The Stamp Collector (1965) TV Episode....Mr. Simpson
- Hazel - A Lot to Remember (1965) TV Episode....Auctioneer
- Bewitched - And Something Makes Four (1969) TV Episode....Mr. Berkeley
- The Bold Ones - The Loneliness Racket (1970) TV Episode....Judge Miller
- Temperatures Rising - Operation Bingo (1972) TV Episode....Colonel (as John Heistand)
- The Fisher Family - Conspiracy of Silence (1973) TV Episode....H.C. Bigelow
- The Waltons - The Best Christmas (1972) TV Episode....Radio News Announcer (voice) - The Seashore (1977) TV Episode....Radio Announcer (voice) - The Rumor (1978) TV Episode....Radio Announcer (voice) - Day of Infamy (1978) TV Episode....Announcer (voice, as Bud Heistand) - The Last Ten Days (1981) TV Episode....Radio Announcer 2 (voice, as Bud Heistand)
