= John Rose Cormack =

Scottish physician and medical journalist

Sir John Rose Cormack FRSE FRCP

Personal details
- Born: 1 March 1815 Stow, Midlothian, Scotland
- Died: 13 May 1882 (aged 67) Paris, France
- Occupation: Physician

Sir John Rose Cormack (1 March 1815 – 13 May 1882) was a Scottish physician and medical journalist. He established several notable British journals: the Edinburgh Monthly Journal of Medical Science; the London Medical Journal; and the Associated Medical Journal (a predecessor of the British Medical Journal).

== Life ==
He was born in Stow in the Scottish Borders on 1 March 1815, the son of Helen Rose, sister of Sir John Rose of Holm, and local minister, Rev John Cormack DD. He attended the High School in Edinburgh and then studied medicine at the University of Edinburgh graduating with an MD in 1837, having won the Harveian Prize in 1836 and a gold medal in 1837 for his thesis on the presence of air (oxygen) in the organs of circulation.

Following graduation he visited Paris and then did a tour of both Italy and Spain before returning to Edinburgh to set up as a physician. He was appointed Physician to the Edinburgh Royal Infirmary in 1841 and in the same month founded the Edinburgh Monthly Journal of Medical Science. During this time he also operated a Dispensary from 131 Princes Street.

In 1842 he was elected a member of the Harveian Society of Edinburgh. In 1843, he was elected a Fellow of the Royal Society of Edinburgh; his proposer being Sir Robert Christison.

In 1847, he moved to Putney, London and founded both the London Medical Journal and the Associated Medical Journal.

In 1858, he moved to Paris, France, heading the Hertford British Hospital in that city. In the Siege of Paris (1870–1871) he showed exemplary effort tending the English and French wounded, often from his own house on Rue D’Agnesseau, the French government awarding him a Chevalier of the Legion of Honour in consequence, and a French MD degree. His pupils included Dr John Francis Sutherland.

He was knighted by Queen Victoria in 1872 for the same role.

== Family ==
He married Eliza Anne Hine in 1842 and they had seven daughters and four sons, four daughters and one son surviving him. One son, Dr Baillie Cormack, assisted him during the Siege of Paris and died in 1876.

== Freemasonry ==
Cormack was a Scottish Freemason. He was Initiated in Lodge Canongate Kilwinning, No. 2, on 30 November 1835. The entry in the Lodge's records state that he was 'M.D. Paris.'

== Death ==
He died of chronic disease of the prostate and bladder at his home on Rue St Honore in Paris on 13 May 1882.

== Positions held ==
- Senior President to the Edinburgh Royal Medical Society, 1837-

== Publications ==
- Translation of Georges Phillipe Trousseau’s Clinical Lectures (four volumes)
