= John Sutherland (footballer) =

Australian rules footballer, born 1904

Personal information
- Full name: John Stephen Sutherland
- Born: 3 August 1904; Barmah, Victoria
- Died: 21 June 1966 (aged 61); Fitzroy, Victoria
- Original team: Nathalia

Playing career^{1}
Years	Club	Games (Goals)
1925	Footscray	1 (0)
- ^{1} Playing statistics correct to the end of 1925.

John Stephen Sutherland (3 August 1904 – 21 June 1966) was an Australian rules footballer who played with Footscray in the Victorian Football League (VFL).
