= Destination Earth =

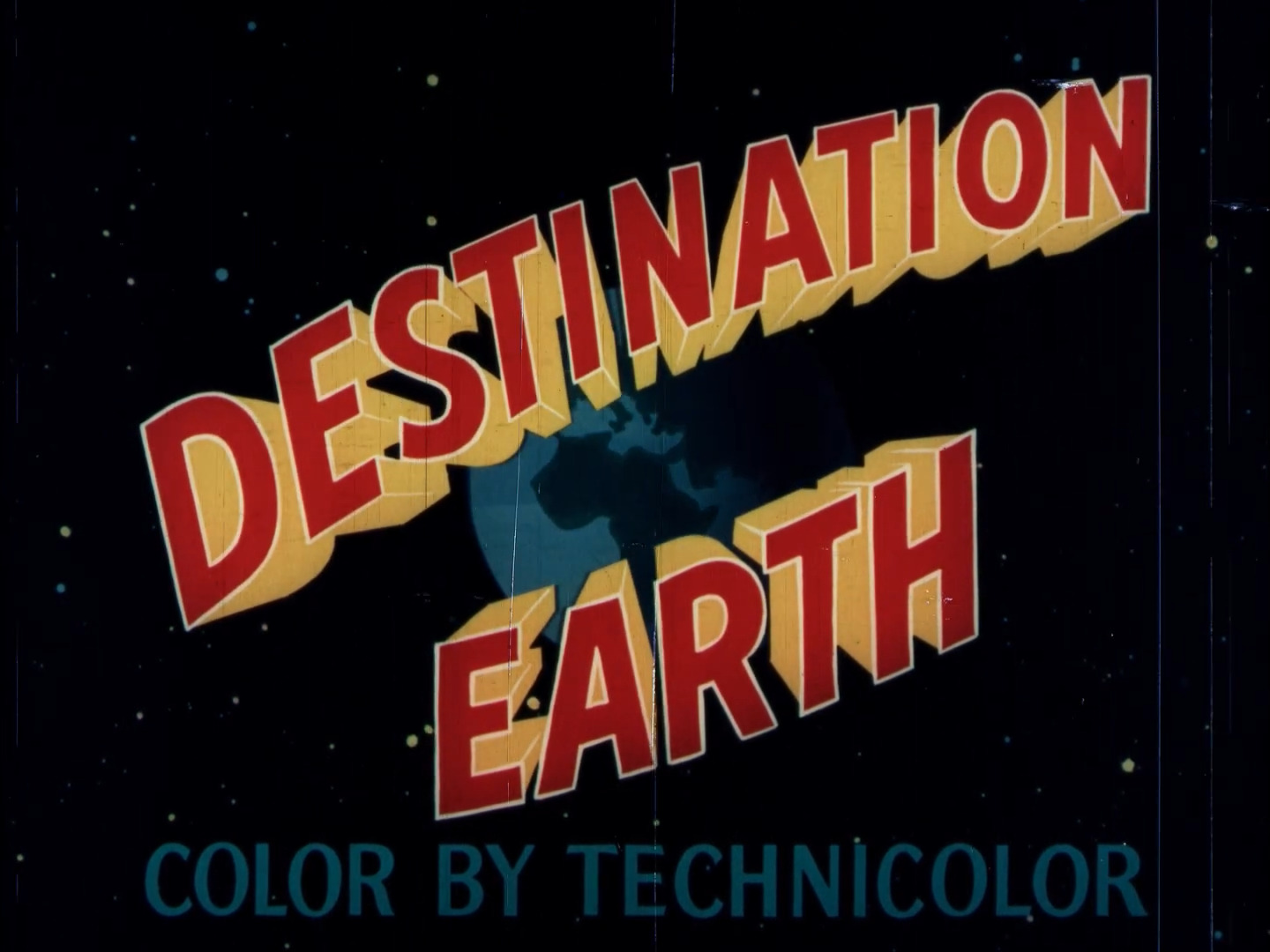
- Title card
- Directed by: Carl Urbano
- Written by: Bill Scott; Michael Amestoy; George Gordon
- Produced by: John Sutherland
- Animation by: George Cannata; Ken O'Brien; Bill Higgins; Tom Ray; Russ Von Neida
- Layouts by: Tom Oreb; Vic Haboush
- Backgrounds by: Joe Montell
- Color process: Technicolor
- Production company: John Sutherland Productions
- Distributed by: Film Counselors, Inc.
- Release date: 1956
- Running time: 14 minutes
- Language: English

Destination Earth (1956) by Carl Urbano

Destination Earth is a 1956 promotional cartoon created by John Sutherland and funded by the American Petroleum Institute. The short explains the fundamentals of the petroleum industry and how petroleum products enrich everyday life in the United States, as well as the benefits of a free market economy.

== Synopsis ==
Destination Earth begins on the planet Mars, where the emperor Ogg (reminiscent of Stalin) is addressing an arena of his subjects. Prior to this, Martian society is shown with virtually everything having puns akin to Ogg and billboards extolling "our glorious leader". The Martians are "invited" to attend a speech at a stadium, where one Martian who tries to run away is "convinced" otherwise by being fired at by laser rifles. During the speech, Ogg dictates his audience's reactions, through a remote-controlled teleprompt. The Martians are shown to have stony, unhappy expressions. Ogg then welcomes a bumbling subordinate Martian, Colonel Cosmic, onto the stage to share his discoveries from a mission to Earth.

In a flashback scene, Cosmic exalts Ogg's ingenious discoveries, such as Ogg-Energy (a Martian powered treadmill) and Ogg-Speed, which consists of poking the Martian in the behind with a needle to make him run faster. However, Ogg's method of powering his royal limousine with Ogg-Stick dynamite proves faulty, as the wheels burn due to friction causing the limousine to go out of control and send Ogg flying headfirst into a wall (eliciting a wild applause from the audience). Ogg orders Colonel Cosmic into space to find out other planets' energy sources, with Cosmic showing Ogg's "painstaking research" (blindly stopping his finger on a map of the Solar System and selecting Earth). The Martian sets off and lands in the United States. Using a Martian belt that makes him invisible, Cosmic can spy on Earthlings undetected. He ventures into a nearby city and becomes awestruck when he sees average citizens with "powerful and reliable automobiles" that make their daily lives easier. Colonel Cosmic realizes that Earth vehicles are lubricated with motor oil to prevent friction. The Martian then enters a library (thinking it is a heavily guarded base) and researches the "secrets" of the remarkable power source. Colonel Cosmic realizes that petroleum is hard to find, with only 1 in 9 wells striking oil, 1 in 44 wells turning a profit and 1 in 1000 wells making a tremendous discovery. Despite this, American investors have been willing to take such risks under the hopes of turning a profit, and how competition has encouraged maximization of petroleum. Colonel Cosmic also explains uses for petroleum besides cars such as plastics, jet fuel and heating oil. Colonel Cosmic grabs as many library books as he can and returns to his saucer, where he makes the return trip to Mars. Colonel Cosmic ends his speech by pointing two books, one titled "Oil" and the other "Competition". Ogg remarks that the "oil" book is beneficial for Mars, but not the "competition" one. The Martians excitedly leave the stadium and make plans for oil exploration on Mars, with other Martians such as a cook privatizing the diner he worked in. When Ogg is aghast what is happening, Colonel Cosmic pushes the button on Ogg's belt, rendering him invisible and saying that Ogg's despotism is at an end. Cosmic then tells the viewer that if one is willing to face competition and be innovative, it is "destination unlimited".
