= Chicago Milk Commission =

The Chicago Milk Commission (CMC) was formed in 1908 to combat the consumption of unpasteurized milk which was regarded as a leading cause of infant death in the Chicago area. It established "milk stations" throughout the city, which provided free pasteurized milk. The staff and volunteers of the CMC created the Infant Welfare Society of Chicago in 1911.

In 1916 the Milk Producers Association started a series of milk strikes, to increase the price paid by Chicago dealers. By 1917 the rising price of milk led to much reduced consumption (25% that year alone) causing concerns about child welfare. The CMC set the price to 13 cents per quart, for home delivery, a cent less than the prevailing price.
