= Your Safety First =

1956 short animated film

- Directed by: George Gordon
- Written by: Norman Wright
- Produced by: John Sutherland
- Music by: Eugene Poddany
- Animation by: Ken O'Brien; George Cannata; Fred Madison; Cal Dalton
- Layouts by: Gerald Nevius; Charles McElmurry
- Backgrounds by: Joe Montell
- Production company: John Sutherland Productions
- Distributed by: Automobile Manufacturers of America
- Release date: 1956
- Running time: 12:43 minutes
- Language: English

Your Safety First is a 1956 American promotional cartoon created by the Automobile Manufacturers of America. It was directed by George Gordon and written by Norman Wright. The 13-minute short film set in the year 2000 explains the history of the automobile and the improvements to comfort, performance, and safety that have been made over the years. It has been noted as a precursor to the animated TV series The Jetsons (1962–1963), which borrowed heavily on the ideas presented in the cartoon including a three-hour work day, automated flying cars, and robotic arms performing most tasks.

== Synopsis ==
Your Safety First opens with a newspaper from the distant future of October 5, 2000 with headlines reading "Space Travel to Mars" and "tax cuts". The protagonist of the short begins by debating whether to buy a new car or not as his family watches 3-D television. A show then comes on explaining the history of the automobile. The show within the show moves through the beginning of the 20th century starting with hand cranking cars and topless buggies. The clip moves through the decades explaining new inventions like windshield wipers and suspension systems. At the close of the short the character shown in the flashback history of the automobile jumps into a flying car and drives off.
