= Justus Heinrich Wigand =

Baltic German obstetrician

Justus Heinrich Wigand (13 September 1769 – 10 February 1817) was a Baltic German obstetrician born in Reval (Tallinn).

Wigand studied medicine at the Universities of Jena and Erlangen, earning his doctorate at the latter. From 1793 to 1814 he was a physician in Hamburg, and afterwards lived in Heidelberg, Schwetzingen and Mannheim.

He is remembered for introducing an assisted breech delivery procedure known as the "Wigand maneuver". His best written effort, "Die Geburt des Menschen" was published posthumously in 1820.

== Selected publications ==
- Von den Ursachen und der Behandlung der Nachgeburtszögerungen, 1803.
- Drey den medicinischen Facultäten zu Paris und Berlin zur Prüfung übergebene geburtshülfliche Abhandlungen, 1812.
- Die Geburt des Menschen in physiologisch- diätetischer und pathologisch- therapeutischer Beziehung, grösstentheils nach eigenen Beobachtungen und Versuchen dargestellt, 1820.
