= Erinensis =

Irish physician

Erinensis was the pseudonym used by Peter Hennis Green (1803–1870), an Irish medical doctor who edited medical journals and wrote many columns for The Lancet from the 1820s to the 1840s.

== Life ==
Green was born about 1803 in County Cork, Ireland, the son of a farmer. He entered Trinity College, Dublin in 1820. He graduated M.D. in 1827. He specialized in childhood diseases.

From about 1824 to 1836, under the pseudonym Erinensis, he was the Dublin correspondent of the Lancet. As such, he was "the author of a brilliant series of sketches and letters" on the Irish medical scene. He had a sharp eye for the pompous or ridiculous and was encouraged by Thomas Wakley, who had founded the journal in 1823.

James Fernandez Clarke, a medical journalist who worked on the Lancet in its early days, suggested in his autobiography that Erinensis was responsible for the power the Lancet wielded in the 1820s and 1830s. At the end of the 1830s Green spent some time studying childhood diseases in Paris, after which he published articles on them in the Lancet, under his own name.

In 1840 Green founded the Provincial Medical and Surgical Journal, a weekly, and worked as its responsible editor in London. He was then lecturer in diseases of childhood in the Hunterian School of Medicine, Haymarket. At the time a rift had developed between the Lancet and the Provincial Medical and Surgical Association, which no doubt Green wished to take advantage of. Shrewdly, he asked that a member of the Association's council join him as co-editor. However, during the 1840s disagreements arose between staff and the Association. Green left in 1849.

Erinensis's identity remained a secret until the publication of Sir Charles Cameron's History of the Royal College of Surgeons in Ireland, where he wrote that he obtained the information from James Wakley, proprietor of the Lancet.

== See also ==
- Medical Press and Circular

== References and sources ==
Notes

Sources

- Fleetwood, John F (1983). The History of Medicine in Ireland. Dublin: Skellig Press.
- John Fleetwood, The Irish Body Snatchers, Tomar Publishing, Dublin, 1988. ISBN 1-871793-00-9
- Medical journals and medical knowledge: historical essays, by William F. Bynum, Stephen Lock, Roy Porter.
- James F. Clarke, Autobiographical recollections of the medical profession, London, J. & A. Churchill, 1874.
