= Robert James Nicholl Streeten =

British physician and medical editor

Robert James Nicholl Streeten FLS (born 28 June 1800, London – 10 May 1849, Worcester) was a British physician and medical editor and secretary of the Provincial Medical and Surgical Association.

The eldest of eight (or perhaps nine) children of John Mitchell Streeten and Maria Streeten (née Crane), Robert J. N. Streeten was educated at home until he matriculated at the University of Edinburgh in 1820. After studying there until 1822, Robert Streeten studied in Paris in 1822–1823 and returned in 1823 to Edinburgh, graduating in 1824 M.D. Edin. with doctoral thesis De delirio tremente. At Edinburgh he became clinical clerk to the physician and botanist Robert Graham (whom he accompanied on a walking tour to the Highlands). Soon after taking his degree, Streeten was appointed a physician to the Worcester Royal Infirmary and was soon elected a member of "Physicians to the Dispensary" (i.e. Fellow of the Royal Public Dispensary of Edinburgh). In 1836 he became a member of the Botanical Society of Edinburgh. In 1846 he became a Fellow of the Linnean Society of London.

He took an active part in the formation of the Provincial Medical and Surgical Association, and contributed numerous papers to the 'Midland Medical and Surgical Reporter,' and to its successor the 'Provincial Medical and Surgical Journal,' published under the auspices of the Association, of which in 1843 he became Secretary, and soon after took upon himself the duties of responsible editor of the Journal. He was also author of some papers in the 'Transactions' of the Association, and in the 'British and Foreign Medical Review.'

Streeten was the editor-in-chief of the Provincial Medical and Surgical Journal from 1844 until his death in 1849.

- Provincial Medical and Surgical Journal, 1844

== Family life ==
In Worcestershire 1836, Robert Streeten married Sophia Sherwood (1815-1899), youngest daughter of the author Mary Martha Sherwood. As a teen, Sophia began assisting her mother in writing numerous children's books and novels, such as the later The De Cliffords: An Historical Tale (1847), and she soon struck out on her own account. In addition to a memoir about her mother, Sophia wrote a handful of historical or religious-themed novels. After Robert's death, she married another physician Hubert Edmund Charles Kelly in 1851. She died on 12 March 1899 in London.

== Selected publications ==
- with A. W. Davis: "On the Misseltoe." The Analyst: a quarterly journal of science, literature, natural history, and the fine arts, no. 6 (1835): 381–387.
- "On the Progressive Development of the Vegetable Organization." The Analyst: a quarterly journal of science, literature, natural history, and the fine arts, vol. 2, no. 11 (1835): 287–300.
