= List of Harding University alumni =

Harding University is a private university in Searcy, Arkansas. Following are some of its notable alumni.

== Academia ==
- C. Leonard Allen, historian and college administrator
- James D. Bales, professor and administrator
- Martin Doyle, ecologist at the Nicholas Institute for Environmental Policy Solutions of Duke University
- Henry C. Farrar, III, toxicology researcher at University of Arkansas for Medical Sciences
- Clifton L. Ganus Jr., theologian, educator, and president of Harding College
- George Howard, Hebraist and professor emeritus and head of the Department of Religion and Hebrew at the University of Georgia
- E. H. Ijams, president of Lipscomb University
- Annie May Alston Lewis, theological librarian
- Ed Madden, poet, gay rights activist, professor of English, and director of Women's and Gender Studies at the University of South Carolina
- J. Stanley Marshall, college administrator, former president of Florida State University
- Bruce McLarty, academic, minister, and president of Harding University
- Carroll D. Osburn, professor emeritus at Abilene Christian University and leading New Testament textual critic
- Edward Granville Sewell, mathematician and professor at University of Texas, El Paso
- Rubel Shelly, writer, minister, professor, and former president of Rochester College
- Richard Felix Staar, political scientist, historian, and fellow at Stanford
- Jason R. Wiles, associate professor of biology at Syracuse University

== Business ==
- LaMar Baker, businessman and politician
- Michael Blue, billionaire entrepreneur and co-founder of Privateer Holdings

== Entertainment ==
- Roxanne Beck, actress and screenwriter
- Stephen Mark Brown, opera tenor
- David Ray Campbell, screenwriter and producer
- Verna Howard, founder of the radio International Gospel Hour, originally based in Texarkana, Texas
- Korie Robertson, star of A&E's Duck Dynasty and wife of Willie Robertson
- Willie Robertson, star of A&E's Duck Dynasty, CEO of Duck Commander
- W. Stephen Smith, voice teacher and author, Northwestern University Professor of Voice and Opera
- Ray Walker, singer with The Jordanaires

== Law ==
- Jeremy Kernodle, United States district judge
- Ken Starr, attorney, judge, U.S. solicitor general, special prosecutor for the impeachment of Bill Clinton, president and chancellor of Baylor University

== Literature and journalism ==
- Tamera Alexander, author
- Jerry Mitchell, investigative reporter formerly with The Clarion-Ledger in Jackson, Mississippi
- Farrell Till, activist and editor of The Skeptical Review

== Military ==
- George Andrew Davis, Jr., Medal of Honor recipient; fighter pilot and flying ace of the United States Army Air Forces in World War II and the Korean War

== Politics ==
- Tim Barnes, Democratic politician from Tennessee
- George S. Benson, missionary, college administrator, and conservative political activist
- Mary Elizabeth Bentley, Republican member of the Arkansas House of Representatives
- Keith Brooks, member of the Arkansas House of Representatives
- Jim R. Caldwell, first Republican member of the Arkansas State Senate in the 20th century
- Jonathan Dismang, politician
- Timothy Chad Hutchinson, attorney and former member of the Arkansas House of Representatives
- Khalil Jahshan, political analyst, media commentator, and executive director of Arab Center Washington DC, a nonprofit think tank
- David Porter, Texas railroad commissioner
- Harmon Seawel, former member of the Arkansas House of Representatives
- Ryan Walters, former Oklahoma state secretary of education
- Thomas Philip Watson, politician
- Carlton Wing, member of the Arkansas House of Representatives

== Religion ==
- George S. Benson, missionary, college administrator, and conservative political activist
- Charles Coil, evangelist
- Roger Duke, theologian
- Gary Holloway, executive director of the World Convention of Churches of Christ
- Larry M. James, minister, social worker, and CEO of the Dallas housing enterprise CitySquare

== Sports ==
- Janet Cherobon-Bawcom, Olympian distance runner
- Tank Daniels, former NFL American football linebacker
- Scarborough Green, MLB outfielder
- Chad Marshall, Major League soccer player
- Bryce Mitchell, mixed martial arts fighter
- Jon Murray, university cross country coach
- Jim Nichols, football coach
- Ty Powell, professional football player
- Matt Riviera, professional wrestler
- Preacher Roe, Major League Baseball pitcher
- Arthur Hubert "Hubie" Smith, basketball coach
- Stephany Smith, women's basketball coach
- Ronnie Peacock, legendary Arkansas high school football coach

== Other ==
- Botham Jean, murder victim
