= David Burks =

American academic

Interim President of Harding University
- In office December 1, 2020 – June 1, 2022
- Preceded by: Bruce McLarty
- Succeeded by: Michael Williams

4th President of Harding University
- In office May 1987 – June 1, 2013
- Preceded by: Clifton Ganus
- Succeeded by: Bruce McLarty

2nd Chancellor of Harding University
- In office June 1, 2013 – December 1, 2020
- Preceded by: Clifton Ganus
- Succeeded by: Mike Williams

Personal details
- Born: May 13, 1943 (age 83); Ava, Missouri, U.S.
- Spouse: Leah Gentry (m. 1965)
- Parent: Basil Burks
- Education: Harding College (BS); University of Texas (MBA); Florida State University (PhD)

David B. Burks (born May 13, 1943) is an American academic and businessman. He was the fourth President of Harding University in Searcy, Arkansas from 1987 to 2013, after which he became the institution's second chancellor. Burks was the dean of the university's School of Business from 1977 until becoming president.

Beginning in late 2020, Burks served as Harding's interim president while a committee searched for former President Bruce McLarty's permanent successor. He was replaced by Mike Williams in June 2022.

== Early life and career ==
Burks was born on May 13, 1943, in Ava, Missouri and grew up in Truth or Consequences, New Mexico. Enrolling at Harding College in 1961, Burks only planned to stay for a single year. His professors eventually convinced him to remain the school; as a senior, he served as president of the Student Association. After graduating in 1965, Burks married Leah Ann Gentry.

Burks briefly worked for Exxon Corporation in Houston, Texas before returning to Harding in 1967 to serve as the Director of Placement and to teach business. He eventually received an MBA from the University of Texas and a PhD from Florida State University.

In 1974, Burks was appointed the dean of Harding's School of Business. As a professor and dean, he received the university's Distinguished Teacher Award in both 1974 and 1986.

== Presidency (1987-2013) ==
The Board of Trustees designated Burks as then-President of Harding Clifton Ganus's successor in May 1986. After beginning the role in May 1987, Burks was officially inaugurated as President of Harding University on September 18, 1987.

On October 28, 2011, Burks announced that he would retire as president following the 2012–2013 school year. John Simmons, chairman of the Board of Trustees, led the committee to find Burks' successor, who was announced to be Bruce McLarty on November 1, 2012. McLarty took over the presidency on June 1, 2013. At this time, Burks became Chancellor, replacing Ganus. In November 2020, McLarty was removed as president and Burks took his place on an interim basis.

On October 27, 2021, Harding's Board of Trustees announced that McLarty's permanent successor would be Michael D. Williams, who has served as president of Faulkner University in Montgomery, Alabama since 2015. Burks' term as interim president ended on June 1, 2022.
