= Zambia Medical Mission =

2004 Medical Mission Team

The Zambia Medical Mission is an annual medical outreach conducted in the remote villages of southern Zambia. The outreach is affiliated with the Churches of Christ and is locally operated from the Namwianga Mission just outside Kalomo, Zambia. The Zambia Medical Mission is a non-profit organization based in Abilene, Texas. It is one of the largest recurring medical missions in the world.

Each July the medical mission team consisting of approximately 240 American and Zambian volunteers traverse rural Zambia providing medical care, food relief, AIDS education, and spiritual counseling to the Zambian people. In 2017, approximately 12,500 people received care.
