= Dean L.C. Sears House =

Historic house in Arkansas, United States

- Dean L. C. Sears House
- Formerly listed on the U.S. National Register of Historic Places
- Location within Arkansas Location within the United States
- Location: 805 E. Center St., Searcy, Arkansas
- Coordinates: 35°14′54″N 91°43′41″W
- Area: less than one acre
- Built: 1935
- Architectural style: Late 19th And 20th Century Revivals, English Revival
- MPS: White County MPS
- NRHP reference No.: 91001208

Significant dates
- Added to NRHP: July 20, 1992
- Removed from NRHP: January 28, 2016

The Dean L.C. Sears House was a historic house at 805 East Center Street in Searcy, Arkansas. It was a 2 1/2-story wood-frame structure with English Revival architecture, built on campus in 1935 for Dean L.C. Sears, the first dean of Harding University after its move to Searcy from Morrilton.

The house was listed on the National Register of Historic Places in 1992. It has been listed as destroyed in the Arkansas Historic Preservation Program database, and was delisted in 2018.

== See also ==
- National Register of Historic Places listings in White County, Arkansas
