= James W. Carr =

American educator (born 1948)

James W. Carr is an American educator and businessman.

== Biography ==
Carr was nominated by President George W. Bush and confirmed by the United States Senate to the National Security Education Board in 2005 and worked in that capacity until 2011. In 2020, Carr was appointed by U.S House minority leader, Representative Kevin McCarthy, to the US Commission on International Religious Freedom (USCIRF). Before retirement in 2019, Carr had was a professor of business, senior vice president, and executive vice president of Harding University in Searcy, Arkansas. Carr was appointed to the Arkansas Forestry Commission in 2004 by Arkansas Governor Mike Huckabee and was reappointed to the Commission in 2012 by Arkansas Governor Mike Beebe, during which time he was vice chairman of the board. In 2015, Carr was appointed by Governor Asa Hutchinson to the Arkansas Higher Education Coordinating Board, where he was chairman from 2018-2020 and in 2025 was once again selected chairman.. He was reappointed by Governor Hutchinson in 2020 for another 6-year term. Carr was on the board of directors of World Christian Broadcasting since 1993. From 1980 to 1984, Carr was on the board of directors of the Comsafe Company, a Jack Nicklaus-Golden Bear company headquartered in Tallahassee and West Palm Beach. He is on the executive board of the Quapaw Council of the Boy Scouts of America, on the board of the Arkansas State Chamber of Commerce, on the Business Board of First Community Bank and on the board of 21Wilberforce. He has been awarded twice with bronze medallions by The Arkansas Martin Luther King Commission for the promotion of racial harmony within the state.

Prior to joining the administration of Harding University, Carr was a regional director at The American College Testing Program (ACT) and in various administrative positions at Florida State University. Following his tenure at FSU he was elected vice president of FSU’s alumni association. He received his Bachelor of Science from Harding University and later received his PhD from Florida State University. He has consulted with hundreds of colleges and universities in the areas of enrollment management, institutional advancement, and strategic planning.

On 21 December 2021, Carr was sanctioned by the Chinese government as part of retaliatory sanctions after U.S. government imposed sanctions on Chinese officials.

Carr is CEO and Chairman of Highland Home Holdings, an investment company.

== Personal life ==
James W. Carr was born in Tallahassee, FL, on the campus of Florida State University, where he attended the University School through high school graduation. Carr is a member of Tau Kappa Epsilon fraternity (TKE) Delta Iota chapter. He is married to Susan Housley Carr and has 3 children.
