= Bruce McLarty =

5th President of Harding University
- In office June 1, 2013 – November 30, 2020
- Preceded by: David Burks
- Succeeded by: David Burks (interim)

Personal details
- Born: Bruce D. McLarty; May 3, 1957 (age 69) Nashville, Tennessee, U.S.
- Spouse: Ann Hutson (m. 1980)
- Children: 2
- Education: Harding College (BA); Harding Graduate School of Religion (MTh); Ashland Theological Seminary (DMin)

Bruce D. McLarty (born May 3, 1957) is an American academic and Christian minister. He served as the fifth president of Harding University in Searcy, Arkansas, from 2013 to 2020. Prior to becoming president of the university, McLarty served as the institution's Dean of the College of Bible and Ministry and as Vice President for Spiritual Life from 2005 to 2013. McLarty was the primary minister of College Church of Christ in Searcy from 1991 to 2005; he has held other preaching positions in Tennessee and Mississippi.

The Harding University Board of Trustees announced on October 30, 2020, that McLarty would end his tenure as president effective November 30. He was succeeded by former president David Burks, who served briefly as president until a permanent replacement was found.

== Early life ==
McLarty was born on May 3, 1957, in Nashville, Tennessee. The son of Durley and Sue (née Birdwell) McLarty, he has two younger siblings, a set of twins. McLarty's parents also had a set of triplets, all of whom died in infancy. Durley and Sue McLarty both graduated from Tennessee Technological University in 1960, subsequently moving the family to Oklahoma where Durley worked for the United States Army Corps of Engineers.

McLarty never attended kindergarten; he enrolled at Wilson Elementary for first grade after his family moved to Little Rock, Arkansas. His parents were members of the Pulaski Heights Church of Christ. McLarty lived in Memphis, Tennessee, for a year before moving to Washington, D.C., in 1968. He attended public high schools until his senior year, graduating from Harding Academy in Memphis in 1975.

== Education and marriage ==
McLarty began attending Harding College (later Harding University) in Searcy, Arkansas in 1975, graduating early in 1978. A Bible major and biblical languages minor, McLarty lived in Armstrong Hall as a freshman and Keller Hall as a sophomore and junior. He met Harding nursing student Ann Hutson in 1977, and the pair eventually married on May 31, 1980, in Ohio.

Bruce and Ann McLarty relocated to Marks, Mississippi, in 1980, where Ann worked at a county hospital until they moved to Memphis. In 1984, the couple participated in a mission trip to Kenya. McLarty has described the trip as "traumatic" and "a great difficulty"; the couple returned to the United States after fourteen months.

== Preaching and academic career ==
McLarty served as the preacher of College Side Church of Christ in Cookeville, Tennessee, from 1985 to 1991. In July 1991, he was hired as the preacher for College Church of Christ in Searcy, Arkansas. After serving College Church of Christ for fourteen years, then-President of Harding University David Burks invited McLarty to become the school's Vice President for Spiritual Life in January 2005. At some point, he also became Dean of the College of Bible and Ministry.

In 2010, McLarty received a Doctor of Ministry degree from the Ashland Theological Seminary in Ashland, Ohio. His dissertation discussed how "faith-based schools tend almost inevitably to walk away from their faith, given enough time and, ironically, often become an enemy of the faith that founded them."

== Presidency (2013-20) ==
On October 28, 2011, David Burks announced that he would retire as President of Harding University after the 2012–13 school year. John Simmons, chairman of the Board of Trustees, led the committee to find Burks' successor. After three rounds of interviews, McLarty was announced as Burks' replacement on November 1, 2012. He officially started the role on June 1, 2013, and was inaugurated on September 20.

=== Murder of Botham Jean ===
McLarty was president of Harding when Botham Jean, a 2016 graduate of the university, was fatally shot by off-duty police officer Amber Guyger in Dallas, Texas, on September 6, 2018. McLarty called Jean's death a "tragic loss of a beloved brother" and said that "[Jean] came through this school and left an impression on everybody here."

=== George S. Benson Auditorium controversy ===
In June 2020, an alumnus created a Change.org petition calling for the renaming of Harding University's George S. Benson Auditorium. The auditorium's namesake, George S. Benson, served as the second president of Harding College from 1936 to 1965 and was at one time a defender of racial segregation and opponent of interracial marriage. The petition, which proposed putting Botham Jean's name on the building instead, arose in the wake of the George Floyd protests and the related racial unrest across the country.

On June 24, 2020, McLarty put out a statement confirming that the university would not rename the auditorium. "Rather than remove his name, the University needs to tell the more complete story of Dr. Benson - both the high points and the low points," McLarty stated on the matter. He expressed regret towards Harding's past of segregation, but used Benson's history as a missionary in Africa to defend him.

=== Dismissal ===
On October 30, 2020, Harding University announced that McLarty's tenure as president would end on November 30. Dr. Robert Walker, chairman of the Board of Trustees, stated that "recent economic and higher education trends have created an extremely challenging business environment that has impacted the institution, leading the board to make a change." David Burks, McLarty's predecessor, took over as president on December 1 while a committee was formed to appoint a permanent successor.
