= James Burton Coffman =

American minister (1905–2006)

James Burton Coffman (May 24, 1905 – June 30, 2006) was an American minister and theologian, considered to be "one of the most influential figures among Churches of Christ in the 20th century." He was known for his exhaustive writing and study of Old Testament and New Testament scriptures. Throughout his life he served as a preacher, teacher, author, and community leader. Most of his career defined him as a teacher and administrator in school systems, congregational contexts, and as a military chaplain.

== Ministry ==
Throughout thirty years of congregational ministry, Coffman served and preached at the Central Church of Christ in Houston, Texas, where he helped build a facility on Montrose Boulevard.

In New York City, New York, Coffman initiated "The Manhattan Project", in which he helped to raise more than $1 million to build the first facility for the Churches of Christ in New York County on what happened to be the most expensive real estate in the world. Coffman noted that "For 100 years, Churches of Christ in (New York City) have worshipped in converted residences, lodge halls, mortuaries, theaters and other make-shift facilities. A hundred years is long enough to prove that success cannot be attained by such means." Manhattan Church of Christ still stands and serves on the Upper East Side today. He also served for a short time in the District of Columbia.

Later serving as a chaplain in the United States Armed Forces, Coffman held many gospel meetings internationally. He also formed an initiative to increase the number of personnel serving as United States Air Force chaplains from the Churches of Christ.

He spent a year as vice-president of Harding University in Searcy, Arkansas. He received honorary degrees from Abilene Christian University, Pepperdine University, and Magic Valley Christian College.

== Authorship ==
Coffman is the author of a 37-volume verse-by-verse commentary series, which includes every book in the Protestant Bible, which he finished in 1992. It is as an amalgamation of many varying interpretations laid side-by-side for study, along with research into the historical backgrounds of the biblical text.

== Education ==
- B.A., Abilene Christian University (1927)
