= James D. Bales =

American minister (1915–1995)

James David Bales
- Born: November 5, 1915; Tacoma, Washington
- Died: August 16, 1995 (aged 79); Searcy, Arkansas
- Education: Harding University, Peabody College, University of California at Berkeley
- Occupation: Bible Professor
- Years active: 1944-1980
- Notable work: The Martin Luther King Story: A Study in Apostasy, Agitation, and Anarchy
- Spouse: Mary
- Children: 6

James David Bales (November 5, 1915 - August 16, 1995) was an influential Bible professor, controversialist and administrator at Harding University (then Harding College) for almost forty years.

== Early life and education ==
He was born in Tacoma, Washington, but soon moved to Albany, Georgia. He was eleven when his parents were both killed by a train. He then lived with his grandparents in Fitzgerald, Georgia and attended the Woodward Academy, where he was a wrestler. In 1932, he went to Georgia Tech High School, graduating in 1933. He received his bachelor of arts degree at Harding College, where he was also a state wrestling champion in 1936, and received a master's degree at George Peabody college, followed by a doctorate in theological studies at the University of California, Berkeley.

== Later life and work ==
He was widely known for his conservative viewpoints, both in religious matters and in politics through his work with the college's American Studies Institute and an adjacent institute, the National Education Program. Working closely with the founder of the National Education Program (NEP), Harding President and nationally known conservative activist George S. Benson, Bales played a leading role in establishing Harding, through the work of the National Education Program and School of American Studies, as a nationally known center for conservative activism. He published, among other works, The Martin Luther King Story: a Study in Apostasy, Agitation, and Anarchy, which attacks King as a radical and a communist.

One of Bales' opponents, Don Haymes, concisely summarized a widespread view of Bales in a 1977 essay (which represented the views of a faction within the Churches of Christ opposed to the strong political and theological conservatism represented by Bales, Benson, and the School of American Studies):

In the beginning, 30 or more years ago, he was Young Lochinvar riding out of the West, a newly minted Doctor of Philosophy from Berkeley, boldly slaying the dragons of Error and rescuing the distressed damsels of Truth. If today he seems more like Don Quixote, loping along on a flea-bitten nag, helmet slightly askew, armed with a pen rather than a lance, befuddled by the alchemy of the printed word—it is perhaps only our perceptions which changed; where once we saw dragons and giants, the cold light of time reveals only windmills, and the fair damsels are seen to be homely harridans hawking their ware. …….. As an author, Dr. Bales assumes legendary proportions. The Harding Graduate School Library lists 64 separate titles from The Christian Conscientious Objector (1944) to Psalm for Frightened and Frustrated Sheep (1976). He has published most of this remarkable output himself, or with the imprint of obscure purveyors of tracts and Bible school literature; but Baker Book House has issued three volumes and Christian Standard has published another; several, including his most notorious work, The Martin Luther King Story, were put out by Billy James Hargis' Christian Crusade. Beyond the books are countless articles on every item from religious controversy from the Pope to the Pentecostals. Through several serious illnesses and the siring of a trainload of talented and attractive progeny, James Bales has managed to propel himself into the eye of almost every storm confronting the Church of Christ for more than three decades.

Bales is tightly linked to George S. Benson and the National Education Program (NEP) at Harding. Much of his work and advocating for Benson and the NEP, as discussed in Sometimes in the Wrong But Never in Doubt. The influence of the NEP long colored perceptions of Bales and Harding College. A controversy involving Bales' influence at Harding, a dispute between Bales and a Harding professor named James Atteberry, is also covered in Hicks' book. Ostensibly a dispute over the theological soundness of a private paper delivered by Atteberry at a Harding faculty meeting, the dispute seemed to involve dissenting faculty and student opinions regarding the overall zeitgeist of the NEP and political, cultural, and religious conservatism at Harding in general.

In addition, his stance in favor of racial segregation garnered criticism. In 1957, 85% of the Harding students and over 100 faculty members signed a paper stating that they would accept integration at Harding. To stop this, Benson enlisted Bales to ameliorate their concerns. Benson and Bales were against racial integration. Bales argued that segregation should be viewed as a local tradition that should be respected. He stated his belief that God accepted all people, no matter their station in life. However, in the New Testament, the church did not dismantle social hierarchies, and acts that were offensive to some church members (such as the eating of meat sacrificed to idols) were avoided so as not to offend them. Bales argued that racial desegregation should be viewed the same way: as an offensive practice to be avoided. Bales' views on Race slowly changed, and Harding College was eventually integrated, despite his argument for putting off such changes until some time in the distant future.

A consensus about Bales' overall legacy remains unclear, but it appears there has been a rapid decline of Bales legacy and presence upon his retirement and death, as suggested by Haymes' conclusion that "His influence in the Harding sphere ran broad and deep, but it has not, I think, run long." []
