= Psathyromyia carpenteri =

Scientific classification
- Kingdom: Animalia
- Phylum: Arthropoda
- Clade: Pancrustacea
- Class: Insecta
- Order: Diptera
- Family: Psychodidae
- Genus: Psathyromyia
- Species: P. carpenteri

Binomial name
- Psathyromyia carpenteri (Fairchild & Hertig, 1953)

Synonyms
- Phlebotomus carpenteri Psychodopygus carpenteri Lutzomyia carpenteri

Species of fly

Psathyromyia carpenteri was first described as Phlebotomus carpenteri in 1953. The species name is dedicated to Col. Stanley Jennings Carpenter, M.S.C., U.S. Army, under whose direction most of the first described specimens were collected.

== Distribution ==
Psathyromyia carpenteri has been found in Belize, Colombia, Costa Rica, Mexico (Campeche, Chiapas, Quintana Roo, Veracruz, and Yucatan), and Panama.

== Bionomics ==
Psathyromyia carpenteri has been collected with light traps in ecologically disturbed areas such as acahual and coffee plantations. Some specimens were collected outside of houses, and very few were collected in the evergreen forest. Larval habitat is not known.

== Medical importance ==
Feeding habits of the adult females are unknown, but collection data suggests that they are not anthropophilic.
