= KVHU =

- Judsonia, Arkansas; United States
- Frequency: 95.3 MHz
- Branding: Harding Radio

Programming
- Format: Variety

Ownership
- Owner: George S. Flinn, Jr.

History
- First air date: August 16, 2006

Technical information
- Licensing authority: FCC
- Facility ID: 164173
- Class: C3
- ERP: 14,000 watts
- HAAT: 134 m (440 ft)
- Transmitter coordinates: 35°13′41″N 91°29′19″W

Links
- Public license information: Public file; LMS
- Webcast: Listen Live
- Website: Official Website

KVHU (95.3 FM) is a commercial radio station affiliated with Harding University in Judsonia, Arkansas. The station is owned by and licensed to Flinn Broadcasting in Memphis, Tennessee. It is operated as part of the Student Media Network overseen by the university's Department of Communication.

KVHU airs a variety format covering a wide range of genres, including Top-40, light rock, oldies, country, big band, jazz, classical, film soundtracks, and comedy. It also provides live coverage of the university's football and basketball games. About 30 students serve as announcers each semester.

The station was assigned its call letters by the Federal Communications Commission on May 10, 2006 and began broadcasting three months later. KVHU serves a 10-county area of northeast central Arkansas, broadcasting with an effective radiated power of 14,000 watts.

== See also ==
- Campus radio
- List of college radio stations in the United States
