= Granville Sewell =

American mathematician

Edward Granville Sewell is an American mathematician, university professor, and intelligent design advocate. He is a professor of mathematics at the University of Texas, El Paso.

== Education ==
Sewell received his PhD from Purdue University in 1972 and an M.S. in mechanical engineering 1977 from the University of Texas, Austin. His BS was from Harding College (now Harding University)

== Contributions ==
=== Mathematics ===
Sewell's primary work is on the solution of differential equations. He published "The Numerical Solution of Ordinary and Partial Differential Equations, Third Edition," World Scientific Publishing, 2014 ISBN 978-981-4635-09-7. His major development effort has been the equation solver PDE2D--A general-purpose PDE solver. Sewell similarly published: "Computational Methods of Linear Algebra, Third Edition," and "Solving Partial Differential Equation Applications with PDE2D".

== Views on origins ==
Sewell is signatory to the Discovery Institute's "A Scientific Dissent from Darwinism" petition. In 2000 Sewell compared the lifelong development of his state of the art software program with Darwin's predictions. After positing modeling the early universe and predicting its evolution, Sewell concludes:

Clearly something extremely improbable has happened here on our planet, with the origin and development of life, and especially with the development of human consciousness and creativity.

This is cited by the Discovery Institute as one of the "Peer-Reviewed & Peer-Edited Scientific Publications Supporting the Theory of Intelligent Design", a claim rejected by critics and the judge in the Dover trial. He also wrote an article in The American Spectator. In these articles he reiterates the view that evolution violates the second law of thermodynamics. Mathematician Jason Rosenhouse wrote a response in The Mathematical Intelligencer entitled "How Anti-evolutionists Abuse Mathematics" and "Does Evolution Have a Thermodynamics Problem?". Physicist Mark Perakh called Sewell's thermodynamics work "depressingly fallacious".

A more comprehensive and recent summary of Sewell's point of view on the second law is given in "Life and the Underlying Principle Behind the Second Law of Thermodynamics."

In 2010, Sewell published a collection of essays on origins: In The Beginning And Other Essays on Intelligent Design The Discovery Institute lists as one of the "Peer-Reviewed & Peer-Edited Scientific Publications Supporting the Theory of Intelligent Design" is a postscript to his 1985 book Analysis of a Finite Element Method: PDE/PROTRAN.
