= Pattie Cobb Hall =

- U.S. National Register of Historic Places
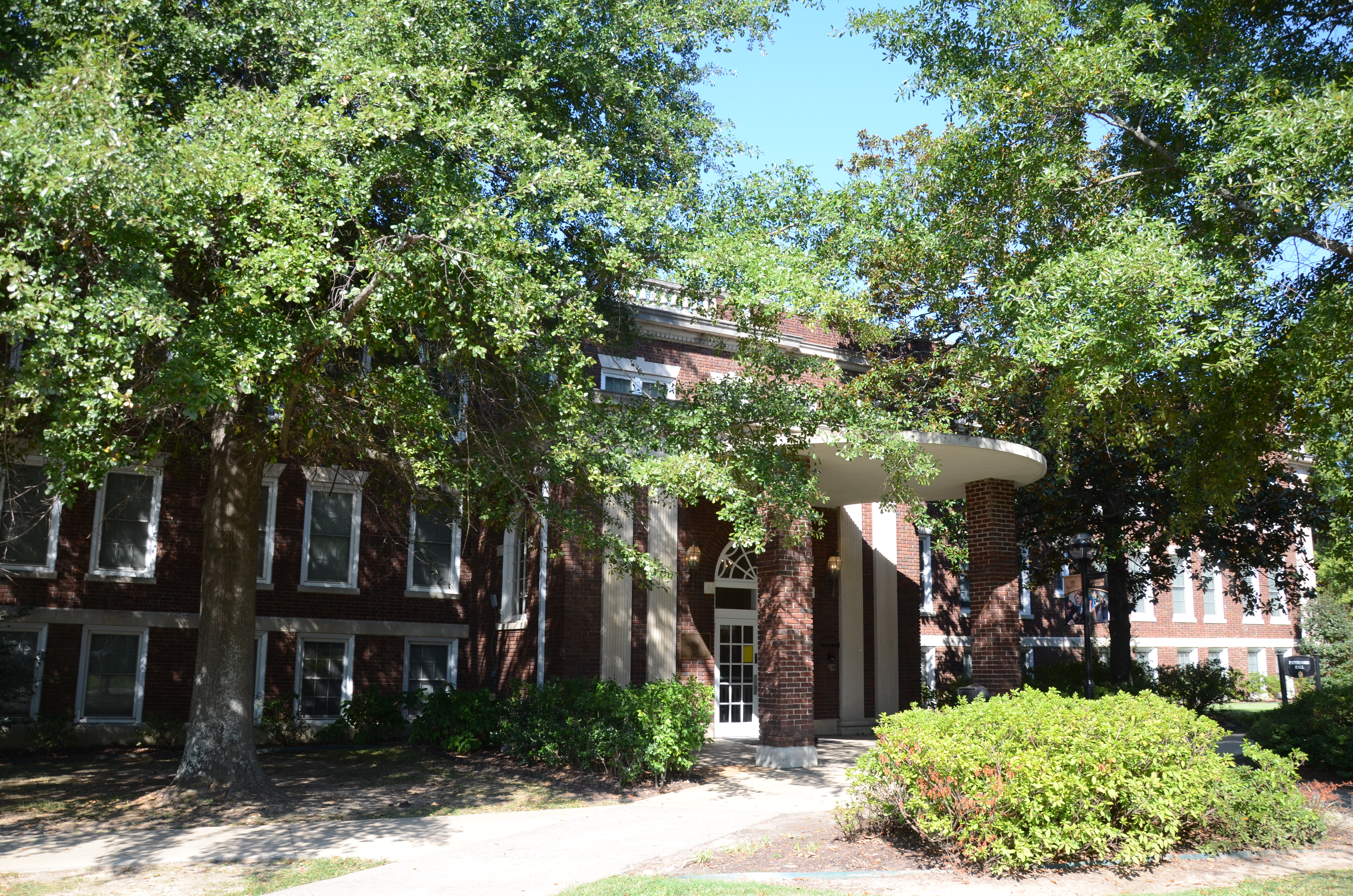

- Location within Arkansas Location within the United States
- Location: 900 E. Center, Harding University, Searcy, Arkansas
- Coordinates: 35°14′50″N 91°43′40″W
- Area: less than one acre
- Built: 1919
- Architectural style: Colonial Revival
- MPS: White County MPS
- NRHP reference No.: 91001209
- Added to NRHP: September 5, 1991

Pattie Cobb Hall, is an historic academic building on the campus of Harding University in Searcy, Arkansas. It is a large three-story Colonial Revival structure, built out of reinforced concrete faced in brick. Its flat roof is encircled by a low balustrade, and a four-column portico projects from the front. The hall was built in 1919, and is one of two buildings surviving from the time when this campus was home to Galloway Female College. That school closed in 1933, and its campus was purchased by Harding the following year.

The building was listed on the National Register of Historic Places in 1991.

== See also ==
- National Register of Historic Places listings in White County, Arkansas
