= Martin Doyle (ecologist) =

Martin W. Doyle (born 1973) is a Professor of Water Science at the Nicholas School of Environment of Duke University.

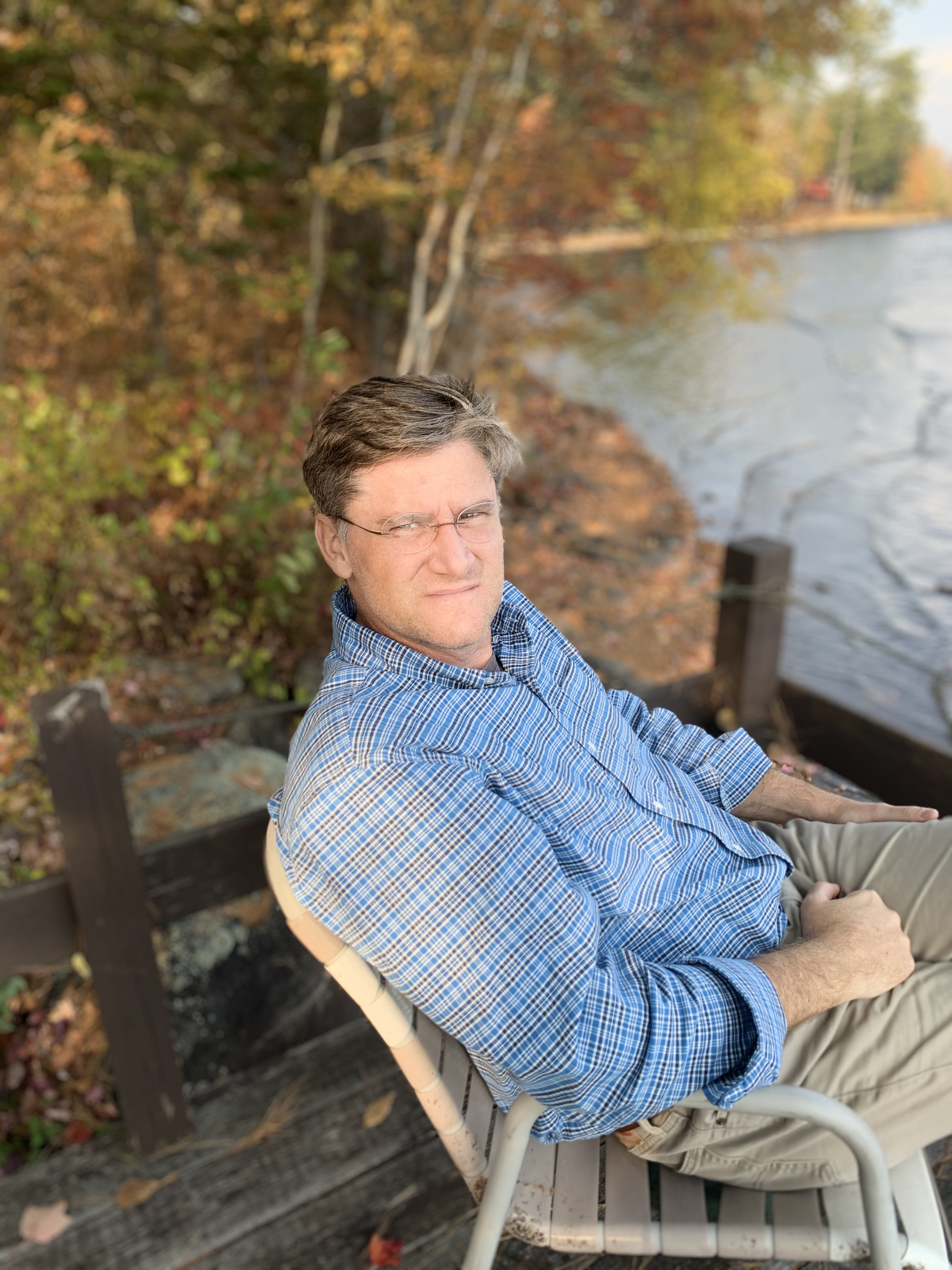
Martin Doyle in 2020

== Education ==
Martin Doyle received a Bachelor's degree in Physics and Applied Mathematics from Harding University in 1995, followed by a master's in environmental engineering from the University of Mississippi in 1997, and a Ph.D. in geomorphology from Purdue University in 2002.

== Professional career ==
From 2002 to 2011, Doyle was faculty at UNC-Chapel Hill in the Department of Geography. In 2011, he moved to the Nicholas School of Environment at Duke University. From 2009 to 2010 Doyle was a Frederick J. Clarke Scholar with the United States Army Corps of Engineers, and in January 2015 Doyle was appointed as the senior conservation finance fellow at the Natural Resource Investment Center, a branch of the United States Department of the Interior.

== Awards and honors ==
- Chorafas Prize
- Nystrom Award
- Guggenheim Fellowship
- Kavli Fellow, National Academy of Sciences
- Gilbert White Lecture, National Academy of Sciences
- Early Career Award, National Science Foundation

== Books ==
- The Source: How Rivers Made America and America Remade Its Rivers, W.W. Norton, 2018. ISBN 978-0393242355

== Peer-reviewed journal articles ==
His most cited peer-reviewed journal articles are:

- Stanley EH, Doyle MW. Trading off: the ecological effects of dam removal. Frontiers in Ecology and the Environment. 2003 Feb;1(1):15-22. According to Google Scholar, this has been cited 331 times
- Ensign SH, Doyle MW. Nutrient spiraling in streams and river networks. Journal of Geophysical Research: Biogeosciences. 2006 Dec;111(G4). According to Google Scholar, this has been cited 338 times
- Shields Jr FD, Copeland RR, Klingeman PC, Doyle MW, Simon A. Design for stream restoration. Journal of Hydraulic Engineering. 2003 Aug;129(8):575-84. According to Google Scholar, this has been cited 297 times
- Lutz BD, Lewis AN, Doyle MW. Generation, transport, and disposal of wastewater associated with Marcellus Shale gas development. Water Resources Research. 2013 Feb 1;49(2):647-56. According to Google Scholar, this has been cited 270 times
