= Fred Schwarz =

Australian activist (1913–2009)

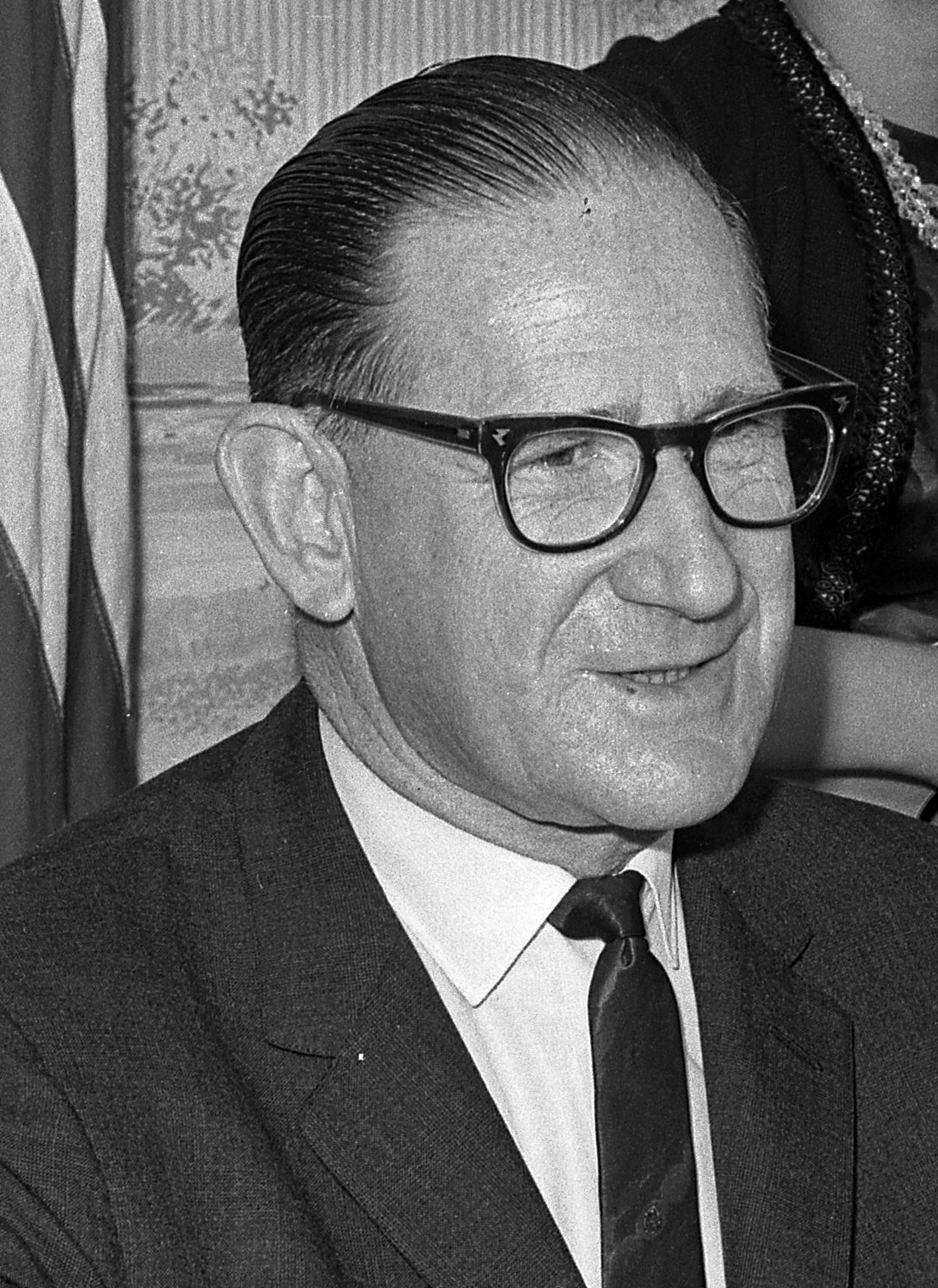
- Schwarz in 1964
- Born: Frederick Charles Schwarz; January 15, 1913; Brisbane, Australia
- Died: January 24, 2009 (aged 96)
- Occupations: physician, writer, political commentator

Frederick Charles Schwarz (15 January 1913 – 24 January 2009) was an Australian physician, author, and political activist who founded the Christian Anti-Communism Crusade (CACC). He made a number of speaking tours in the United States in the 1950s, and in 1960 moved his base of operations to California. He authored several books, including You Can Trust The Communists (To Be Communists). Schwarz worked with his wife, Lillian Schwarz, from abroad and, in his later years, at their Australian home in Camden, New South Wales, near Sydney.

== Early life ==
Schwarz was born in Brisbane, Australia, the fourth of twelve children. His father was a Viennese Jew who emigrated to Australia after his conversion to Christianity.

Schwarz obtained dual degrees in Arts and Science at the University of Queensland, Brisbane, and later completed a degree in medicine. He specialized as both a general practitioner and psychiatrist, and from 1953 kept a private practice at home in the Sydney suburb of Strathfield.

== Career ==
In 1940, following a debate with an Australian communist, Schwarz felt compelled to study communist ideology. Eventually he became a recognised expert on Marxist-Leninist philosophy. He founded and was chairman of the not-for-profit Christian Anti-Communism Crusade (CACC), based originally in Sydney and later in Long Beach, California. He held that position until the late 1990s. During his time with the CACC, Schwarz gave lectures and seminars across the United States on the subject of communism, placing an emphasis on the role of education in understanding Marxism-Leninism from that movement's source documents by Karl Marx, Vladimir Lenin, Leon Trotsky, Mao Zedong, and others. Under Schwarz's leadership, the CACC financed an orphanage in India for impoverished children.

In the early 1960s, Schwarz gained a national following through his television network and powerful allies among southern California anticommunists: Walter Knott, founder of Knott's Berry Farm and member of the John Birch Society, and Patrick Frawley, a magnate whose portfolio included Paper Mate and Technicolor. Knott and Frawley provided financial support to Barry Goldwater's 1964 presidential campaign, and they funded Schwarz's anticommunist rallies.

Schwarz organized a "Southern California School of Anti-Communism" that filled the 16,000-seat Los Angeles Memorial Sports Arena from 28 August to 1 September 1961. The opening night's most popular speaker was Ronald Reagan. According to Morrie Ryskind, writing in The Los Angeles Times, "The evening sessions, featuring nationally known speakers, were televised, and those who should know tell me that some three million people listened in nightly. At any rate, I can honestly say that in my 25 years in Los Angeles I have never known a local event that so completely captured the enthusiasm of the city." A subsequent event, the three-hour "Hollywood's Answer to Communism" held at the Hollywood Bowl on 16 October 1961, featured such celebrities as Roy Rogers, John Wayne, James Stewart and U.S. Senator Thomas J. Dodd. Television critic John Crosby described it as "a monster three-hour concentration of pure venom on television... in which the patriots suggested again and again that the United States was largely peopled by traitors." Singer Janet Greene became CACC's musical director and performed at their meetings.

Schwarz wrote four books and a fortnightly newsletter for nearly 40 years. His first book, You Can Trust the Communists (to be Communists), was published in 1960 by Prentice Hall, and sold over one million copies worldwide. His second book was The Three Faces of Revolution, published in 1972 by Capitol Hill Press.

His third book was the autobiographical Beating the Unbeatable Foe: One Man's Victory over Communism, Leviathan, and the Last Enemy, published in 1996. The foreword reproduces a letter in which US President Ronald Reagan, with whom Schwarz had been friendly for many years, wrote (on 4 January 1990): "Fred, you're to be commended for your tireless dedication in trying to ensure the protection of freedom and human rights." The book included accolades by William F. Buckley Jr., Reed Irvine, John Stormer, and others. In acknowledgement of Schwarz's influence upon Reagan's anticommunist policies and rhetoric, speechwriter Anthony R. Dolan sent Schwarz a copy of Reagan's Evil Empire speech with the note: “I thought you might like to see the oak tree that has grown from the acorn which you planted so many years ago.”

You Can Trust the Communists (to be Communists) was re-published posthumously in 2011 with additional chapters added by David A. Noebel, under the title You Can Still Trust the Communists: To be Communists, Socialists, and Progressives Too. Schwarz had no input into the additional chapters, nor did he endorse them, as they were written and published after his death. The book included an encomium from Phyllis Schlafly that said, "Dr. Fred Schwarz is one of America’s great heroes. In his 50 years of work in the United States, he trained a whole generation to recognize the evil and the danger of Communism at home and abroad. He was a major force in building the conservative anti-Communist movement and in supporting Ronald Reagan’s goal of defeating the 'evil empire'."

Though some critics and supporters have sought to depict Schwarz as conservative and right wing, he eschewed both labels, stating in Time magazine, "We are not angels; we have neither right wings, left wings or any wings." He insisted that the purpose of his work was bipartisan opposition to Communism grounded in a knowledge of its fundamental doctrines.

In 1936, while a student at the University of Queensland, Schwarz established the University of Queensland Medical Society (UQMS), a medical student's union. He pursued industrial action before and after his graduation, successfully ensuring better treatment and higher wages for graduating medical students. In Schwarz's obituary Derek H. Meyers wrote, "Although this industrial action seemed scandalous to older doctors at the time, it is clear that every graduate of an Australian medical school since then owes a debt of gratitude to Fred."

As a notable authority on the ideology, Schwarz expressed sympathy for the appeal of Communism. Appearing on Firing Line with William F. Buckley, he asserted that arguments that Communists are unintelligent, "psychological misfits" are puerile, and that he considered the "Communist critique and analysis of capitalism" to be understandably persuasive to those convinced of capitalism's role in the creation of poverty and war.

Schwarz was the father-in-law of leading Australian clinical cardiologist and medical scientist, Professor Murray Esler.
