= Charles Coil =

American evangelist and educator

- Born: Charles Raymond Coil; December 11, 1929; Flint, Michigan
- Died: December 1, 1994 (aged 64)
- Occupations: Evangelist, Churches of Christ
- Known for: Founding President, Heritage Christian University

Charles Raymond Coil (December 11, 1929 – December 1, 1994) was a leading evangelist among churches of Christ and the founding president of the institution now known as Heritage Christian University.

Coil had been battling cancer when he died at the age of 64 in 1994.

== Early life ==
Coil was born in Flint, Michigan. He was married to the former Maye White in 1951. They had four children.

== Education ==
Coil received a bachelor's degree from Harding University and a Master's of Religious Education from the Harding University Graduate School of Religion.

== Preaching career ==
Coil was the regular pulpit minister for churches of Christ in Knobel, Arkansas; La Porte, Indiana; Florence, Alabama; El Dorado, Arkansas; and West Memphis, Arkansas. In 1965, Coil began full-time revivalist work.

== College President ==
In 1971, Coil began serving as president of the newly formed International Bible College (now Heritage Christian University) in Florence, Alabama. He served in that capacity until December 1989.

== Death ==
Coil died of cancer on December 1, 1994. His funeral was held on December 3, 1994, in the chapel of International Bible College.
