= Ashland Theological Seminary =

Seminary in Ohio USA

Coordinates: 40°51′38″N 82°18′43″W

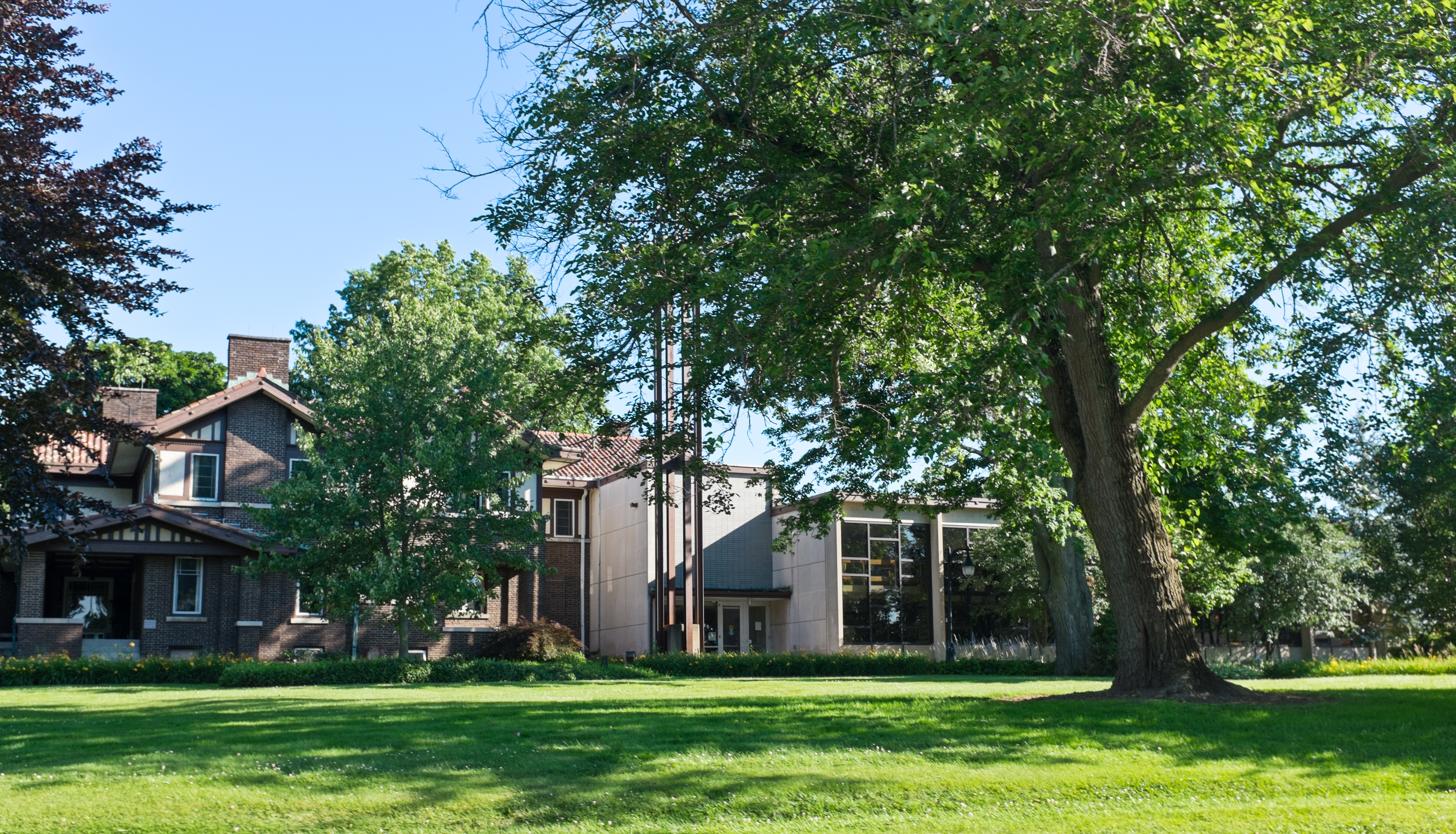
- Established: 1906
- Parent institution: Ashland University
- Affiliations: The Brethren Church
- Students: 264
- Location: Ashland, Ohio, United States
- Website: http://seminary.ashland.edu/

Ashland Theological Seminary is a seminary in Ohio. It is located at 910 Center Street in Ashland, Ohio, with another site located in Cleveland, Ohio. The seminary has students and faculty representing over 30 denominations and over 4100 alumni. Founded in 1906 by the Brethren Church, Ashland Theological Seminary is a graduate division of Ashland University.

The seminary is accredited by the Association of Theological Schools in the United States and Canada and the North Central Association of Colleges and Schools. In 2025, the Master of Arts in Clinical Mental Health Counseling Program is accredited by The Council for Accreditation of Counseling & Related Educational Programs (CACREP).

== Dean ==
In 2025, the Executive Dean is Yvonne Glass.

== Degrees ==
Courses at Ashland Theological Seminary are offered in-person, online, and as hybrid courses. Degrees offered include:

- Master of Divinity
- Master of Divinity (Chaplaincy)
- Master of Arts in Applied Bible and Theology
- Master of Arts in Christian Ministry
- Master of Arts in Applied Bible and Theology
- Master of Arts in Clinical Mental Health Counseling (CACREP)
- Master of Arts in Black Church Studies
- Master of Arts (Biblical Studies)
- Master of Arts (Historical and Theological Studies)
- Doctor of Ministry
- Various certificate programs

== Alumni ==
- Rickey Bolden - American football player
- John B. Ellington Jr. - United States Air Force general
- Al Kresta - American Catholic Church broadcaster, journalist, and author
- Bruce McLarty - American academic and Christian minister
