= Jason R. Wiles =

American biologist

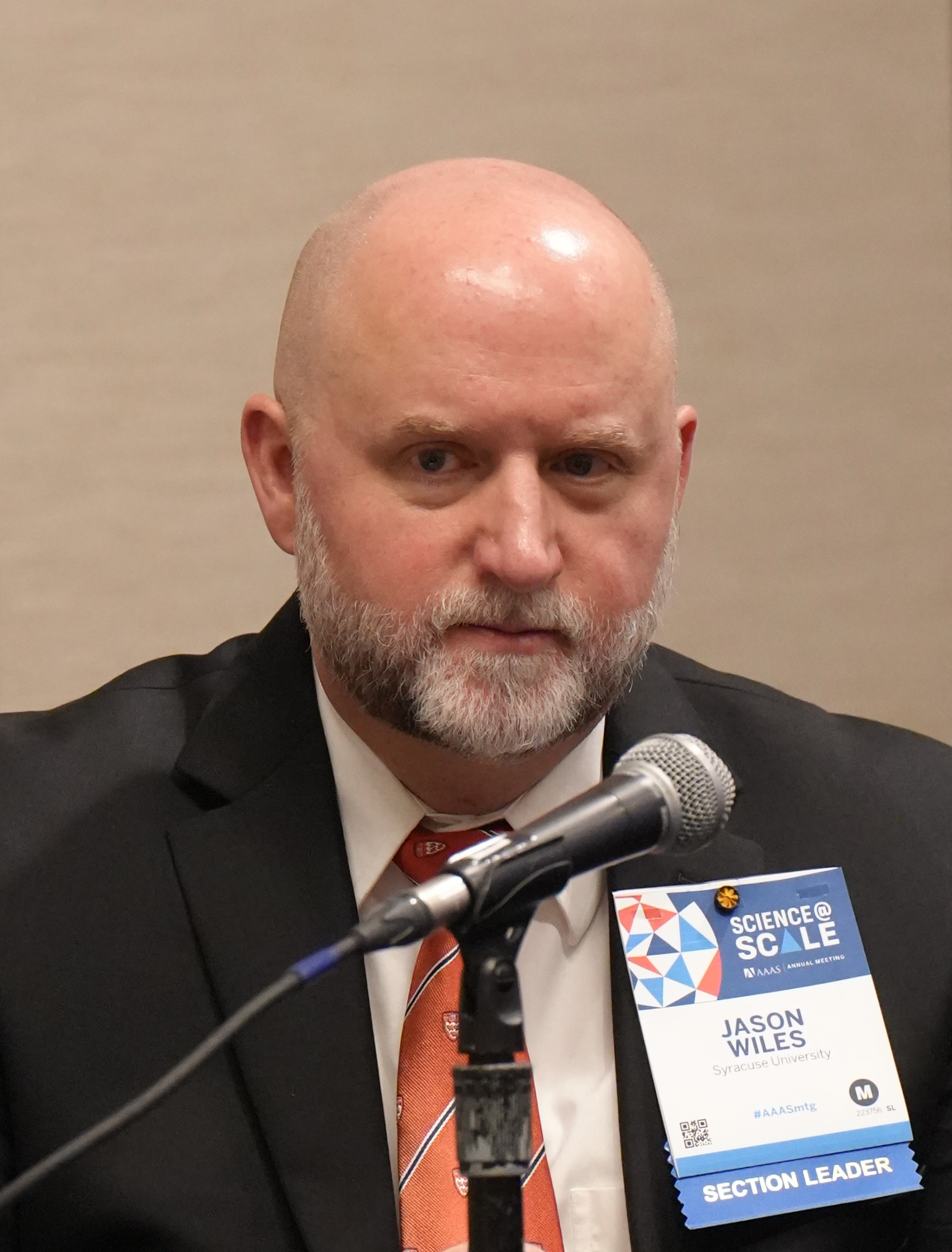
- Wiles in 2026
- Education: McGill University; Mississippi State University; Portland State University; Harding University
- Awards: AAAS Fellow (2022)
- Scientific career
- Workplaces: Syracuse University
- Thesis: Factors potentially influencing student acceptance of biological evolution (2008)
- Doctoral advisor: Brian Alters
- Website: Wiles Lab

Jason R. Wiles is an American biologist who is an associate professor of biology at Syracuse University. His research focuses on education in the life and earth sciences, with a particular emphasis on the teaching and learning of biological evolution. Wiles was elected fellow of the American Association for the Advancement of Science in 2022.

== Career ==
Wiles grew up in Arkansas and attended Harding University, earning a bachelor's degree in biology with a minor in Bible. He then completed master's coursework from Portland State University. After his PhD from McGill University in Montreal, Canada, he stayed there as a co-manager of the Evolution Education Research Centre.

At Syracuse, he also holds courtesy appointments in the Department of Science Teaching and the Department of Earth and Environmental Sciences. He teaches both introductory and advanced courses in the life sciences.

Wiles is a researcher in the field of STEM education and Discipline-Based Education Research (DBER). He has been involved in various initiatives aimed at increasing the representation of underrepresented students in STEM fields, including the NSF-funded ERRUPT grant, SUSTAIN, and CHANcE programs. Wiles has received recognition for his work in teaching, advocacy, and research, including awards from the Technology Alliance of Central New York, the Linnean Society of London, the Society for the Study of Evolution, and the National Center for Science Education.

== Awards and honors ==
- 2022 Elected Fellow of the American Association for the Advancement of Science for "distinguished contributions to science education, particularly for research on and advocacy for evolution education and innovative leadership in recruiting and retaining underrepresented populations in science."
- 2021 Friend of Darwin award
- 2021 Four-Year College & University Section Research in Biology Education Award by the National Association of Biology Teachers

== Selected publications ==
- Jason R Wiles (5 April 2014). "Gifted students' perceptions of their acceptance of evolution, changes in acceptance, and factors involved therein". Evolution: Education and Outreach. 7 (1). doi:10.1186/s12052-014-0004-5. ISSN 1936-6426. Wikidata Q59322938.
- Julia J. Snyder; Jason R. Wiles (28 January 2015). "Peer led team learning in introductory biology: effects on peer leader critical thinking skills". PLOS One. 10 (1) e0115084. Bibcode:2015PLoSO..1015084S. doi:10.1371/journal.pone.0115084. ISSN 1932-6203. PMC 4309528. PMID 25629311. Wikidata Q35023356.
- Ryan D P Dunk; M Elizabeth Barnes; Michael J Reiss; et al. (1 March 2019). "Evolution education is a complex landscape". Nature Ecology & Evolution. 3 (3): 327–329. doi:10.1038/s41559-019-0802-9. ISSN 2397-334X. PMID 30718854. Wikidata Q91341355.
