= Janet Greene =

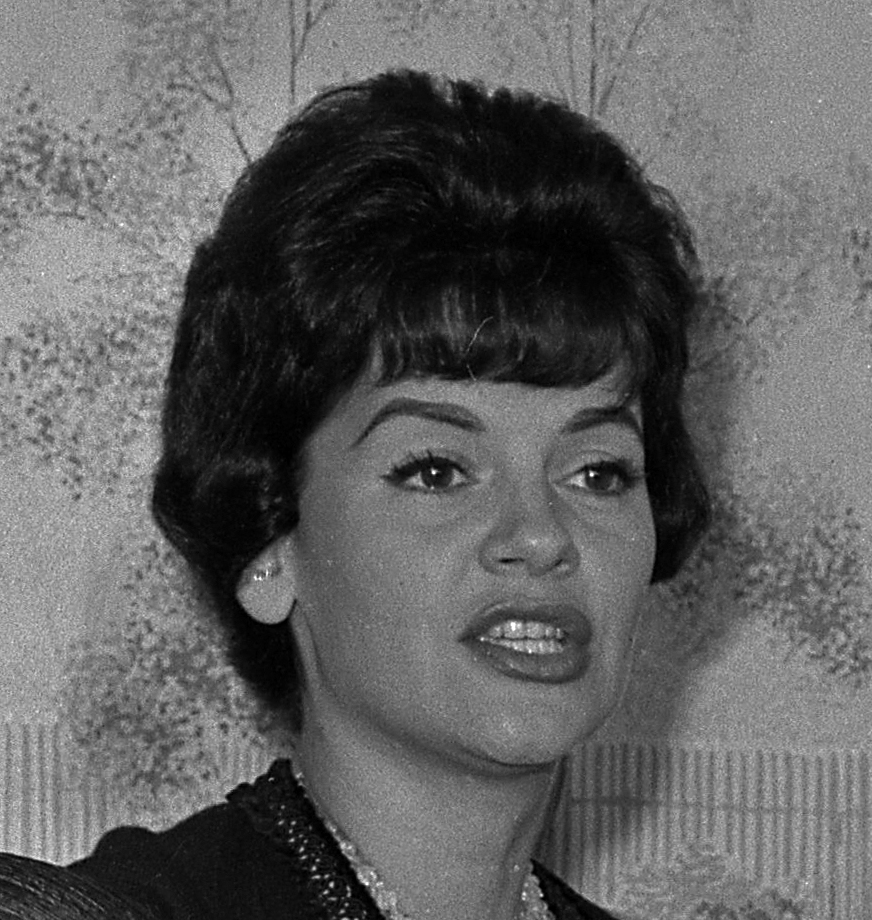
- Greene in 1964

Background information
- Also known as: Janet Greenroos
- Born: Janet Marcum; December 7, 1930; Hamilton, Ohio, U.S.
- Died: March 13, 2021 (aged 90) Klamath Falls, Oregon
- Occupations: Singer, songwriter
- Instrument: Guitar

Janet Greene (née Marcum; December 7, 1930 – March 13, 2021) was an American singer who became noteworthy in the 1960s as a performer of politically right-wing folk songs, and was promoted as the "Anti-Joan Baez".

== Biography ==
Janet Marcum was born into a poor family in Hamilton, Ohio, near Cincinnati. She performed from the age of nine, and in her teens studied at the Cincinnati Conservatory of Music. Her musical aspirations were encouraged by local singer Pat Burke. At the age of 17, she married David Greenroos, and became a mother and homemaker until, in 1954, Burke persuaded her to join him on stage as a singer of duets. She adopted the stage name Janet Greene, and was soon recruited by television station WCPO to take the role of Cinderella in a popular children's show, The Uncle Al Show presented by Al Lewis. Soon after the series was networked nationally in October 1958, Greene was fired by the WCPO General Manager, Mort Watters. When she returned to claim her belongings, she was arrested for causing a disturbance. The case against her went to trial, but she was acquitted in January 1959.

She continued with her singing career, and moved to Columbus, where she created her own Cinderella show on WTVN, and appeared in local productions with the Columbus Symphony Orchestra. In 1964, she and her husband began going to meetings led by anti-Communist speaker and writer Dr. Frederick C. Schwarz, founder of the Christian Anti-Communism Crusade (CACC), and were persuaded by Schwarz's arguments on the evils of communism. After Schwartz became aware of Janet Greene's singing experience, she resigned from WTVN, stating:

I am very grateful to have had the privilege of growing up in the United States of America. I was reared in a Christian home with the love of my parents and my brother and sister... My husband and I have two children of our own, and it is my concern for their future that has prompted me to leave my TV career. Our American heritage and Christian religion are in great jeopardy. The enemy is Communism. Communism denies the existence of God, the individual right to freedom of choice and woman's right to raise her own family as God intended. The Communists plan to take our children away from us.... I am hoping and praying that the women of the United States will become aroused and save our country and our children from the tyranny of Communism. I am dedicating my voice and musical talents to help bring this to pass.

At Schwarz's expense, she and her husband moved to CACC's base at Long Beach, California. Greene sang at the Barry Goldwater election rally held at Knott's Berry Farm on May 30, 1964, sharing the stage with John Wayne and Ronald Reagan. She was appointed musical director of the CACC and sang at their meetings and rallies. The organization promoted her as the right's answer to Joan Baez, though Greene herself saw a Baez concert and described her as "a wonderful artist". Greene wrote songs such as "Fascist Threat", "Poor Left Winger", and "Commie Lies", based on Schwarz's speeches, setting the themes to music, and performing them around the country. In 1966, Greene recorded eight of her songs at a studio owned and operated by Del Kacher (the inventor of the wah-wah pedal), and the songs were released as singles on the Chantico label owned by Schwarz. However, by late 1967 there were tensions between Schwarz and Greene's husband David Greenroos, and the couple ended their involvement with the CACC.

After failing to revive her television career in California, Greene returned to performing as a lounge club singer, not performing her anti-Communist songs. She later developed a restaurant in Long Beach. She and David Greenroos divorced in 1977, and she then remarried, to artist José Nieto. She released an LP, Country & Spanish Flavors, in 1980. Nieto died in 1984, but Greene continued to perform occasionally in nightclubs thereafter. She returned to live in Ohio in the late 1990s.

She died in Klamath Falls, Oregon, in 2021 at the age of 90.
