= Stanley Jennings Carpenter =

American entomologist (1904–1984)

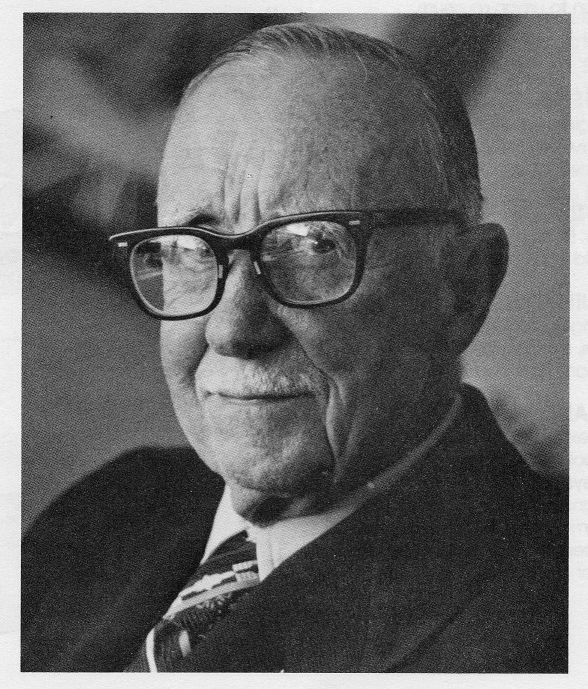
- Col. Stanley J. Carpenter
- Born: December 9, 1904; West Liberty, Morgan County, Kentucky, U.S.
- Died: August 28, 1984 (aged 79); Santa Rosa, California, U.S.
- Years active: 1934 – 1984
- Known for: Medical entomology

Stanley Jennings Carpenter (December 9, 1904 – August 28, 1984) was an American medical entomologist.

== Early life ==
The son of a tobacco farmer, Stanley Jennings Carpenter grew up helping his father but soon developed a strong interest in nature. He was fascinated by birds and insects and at an early age decided he wanted to be a Naturalist. After graduating in 1926 from Hazel Green Academy, a Christian high school, as the Valedictorian, he decided to go to college to pursue his interest in nature. Against his father's wishes (his father wanted him to remain working the farm), he attended Milligan College in Johnson City, Tennessee, and again graduated valedictorian of his class in 1930 with a major in biology.

He then attended the University of Tennessee, where he obtained a master's degree in zoology in 1931. He worked his way through college and did so by washing dishes and waiting tables. He returned to Milligan College, where he taught as an instructor for year. Determined to obtain a Ph.D., he gained a fellowship in ichthyology at Ohio State University, but soon changed to graduate work in entomology, in which he did his studies in 1932 and 1933. Though he finished many of the requirements for his doctorate, he did not complete his thesis.

== Early career ==
With good intentions of returning to complete the degree, he accepted a position on the faculty of Harding College in Searcy, Arkansas. He advanced quickly and became head of the Department of Biology, a position he held from 1934 to 1937. His doctoral studies were never completed. In 1937 he became the entomologist for the Arkansas State Health Department at Little Rock, and he served in that capacity until 1941. His first publication was an 87-page illustrated treatise on the mosquitoes of Arkansas in 1941. The same year he published two papers on the habits and health importance, including malaria, of Arkansas mosquitoes.

== Military service ==
In 1941 he received a commission as an officer in the U.S. Army Sanitary Corps. He was immediately called to active duty as the entomologist at Camp Robinson, Arkansas. Early in 1942 he was sent to the Middle East, where he was assigned to mosquito control work in Kuwait, Iraq, and Iran. Late in 1942 he returned to the United States as head of entomology for the 4th Service Command at Fort McPherson, Georgia. While there he taught mosquito identification to classes of commissioned Army entomologists from various installations in the 4th Service Command. Most of these officers were sent overseas, where they served assignments during World War II in both the European and Pacific theaters.

He left the service in 1942 and worked for 2 years as an entomologist for the National Biscuit Company. This turned out to be the low point in his career. He was, as his wife said, "a fish out of water." He disliked the work and the lack of a major challenge. Controlling the roaches that invaded the kitchen where Fig Newtons were made was an example of one of his assignments.

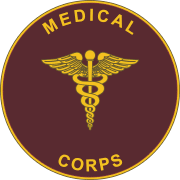
U.S. Army Medical Corps Branch Insignia.

He returned to the service in 1947 and accepted a regular Army commission as Major, first serving as entomologist at the 2nd Army Medical Laboratory at Fort Meade, Maryland. In 1948 he was ordered to the Panama Canal as entomologist in charge of malaria control for the Caribbean Command. Here he served as the commanding officer of a malaria survey unit in charge of more than 100 mosquito control workers in the Canal Zone. He had arrived in Panama as a Lieutenant Colonel but was soon promoted to full Colonel. It was not long until a small outbreak of yellow fever occurred near the Canal Zone. This resulted in a detailed study of forest mosquitoes in Panama and Costa Rica. He was joined in this effort by Dr. Pedro Galindo, Pan-American entomologist, and Dr. Harold Trapido of the Gorgas Memorial Laboratory (named for the Surgeon General of the United States Army Major General William C. Gorgas). One of the recruits Colonel Carpenter selected to aid in the survey was an 18-year-old soldier named E L Peyton, who had joined up before finishing his high school degree. Colonel Carpenter was impressed with this young man's intelligence and initiative. He encouraged him to complete his degree while in Panama; Peyton credits Colonel Carpenter with his entry into a career in systematics. Peyton became a productive scientist with the Walter Reed Biosystematics Unit. His contributions were recognized by the American Mosquito Control Association, which presented him with the Belkin Award in 1993.

In 1951, Colonel Carpenter returned to the United States and was sent to the 9th Service Command Medical Laboratory at Fort Baker, California, where he served a 3-year tour of duty. At the completion of this duty he was sent to Walter Reed Army Institute of Research in Washington, D.C., an assignment that lasted 2 & 1/2 years. In January 1957 he was transferred to the Pentagon, where he served on a board of field-grade officers who reviewed and selected regular Army officers from lists of applicants of reserve officers.

He was transferred back to the Fort Baker Medical Laboratory in July 1957, where he remained until his retirement in 1960. It was while here that Colonel Carpenter completed work on his landmark book, "The Mosquitoes of North America", by Carpenter and La Casse. The publication of this book was entirely the work of Stanley Carpenter and his illustrators. The second author did not contribute to the preparation of the manuscript, other than providing illustrations for some of the plates. This handbook remains an indispensable guide because of the general details it provides for each species.

== Later career ==
He immediately began part-time work for the California State Health Department, now the California Department of Health Services, where for the next 12 years he was engaged in studies of snow pool Aedes mosquitoes. Most of the work was accomplished in the Sierra Nevada of California, and it resulted in a series of more than 20 publications on the biology, ecology, and distribution of these species, all of which appeared in the California Vector Views, published by the California Department of Public Health. After his employment with the California Department of Health, he took up a hobby that had interested him since childhood. He joined the Audubon Society and spent his remaining years birdwatching and compiling a life list.

During his long and distinguished career, Colonel Carpenter authored 80 scientific publications on the systematics, biology, and control of tropical and temperate species of mosquitoes, many of which are of medical importance. Included were two important monographs, The Mosquitoes of North America, previously noted, and The Mosquitoes of the Southern United States, East of Oklahoma and Texas, in 1946, a 292-page book that he coauthored with W. W. Middlekauff and R. W. Chamberlain. In 1981 Colonel Carpenter received the AMCA Medal of Honor. This, the highest award of the AMCA, was given in recognition of his long and distinguished career. In 1984 he was honored by the California Mosquito and Vector Control Association with a resolution recognizing his many accomplishments. Also in 1984, he was honored in an issue of the AMCA journal, Mosquito Systematics. The Panamanian species of biting midge Culicoides carpenteri Wirth & Blanton, 1953 and sand fly Psathyromyia carpenteri (Fairchild & Hertig, 1953) are named in his honor.
