= John A. Stormer =

American author (1928–2018)

- Born: John Anthony Stormer; February 9, 1928; Altoona, Pennsylvania, U.S.
- Died: July 10, 2018 (aged 90); Troy, Missouri, U.S.
- Education: Pennsylvania State University; San Jose State University
- Occupations: author, pastor
- Known for: 1964 book None Dare Call It Treason
- Spouse: Elizabeth
- Children: 1

John Anthony Stormer (February 9, 1928 – July 10, 2018) was an American Protestant anti-communist author, best known for his 1964 book None Dare Call It Treason. Both a pastor and a Christian school superintendent, his books have sold millions, warning America about the communist infiltration of American society, politics and culture. He has been called by the conservative political commentator, Daniel Pipes, "the man who may be the most popular U.S. backstairs author of all time." Richard Hofstadter in The Paranoid Style in American Politics called it a "masterful piece of folkish propaganda."

== Biography ==
Stormer was born in Altoona, Pennsylvania, on February 9, 1928, the son of Regis and Mary Ann (Forr) Stormer. He attended Pennsylvania State University and served as an Air Force editor and historian during the Korean War. After the war, he graduated from California's San Jose State University with a B.A. in journalism. He served for several years as editor and general manager of an electrical magazine. In 1962, he left the business world for studying and writing about communism. He founded Liberty Bell Press in 1963.

Stormer was involved in the Republican party, serving on the Missouri Republican State Committee and as state chairman of the Missouri Federation of Young Republicans from 1962 to 64. In 1964, he was a member of the Missouri delegation to the Republican Convention which nominated Barry Goldwater as presidential candidate. In the 1990s, he was a member of the Council For National Policy.

In 1965, Stormer was born again and soon started to preach the gospel and to write for the Fundamentalist Christian Beacon. He served as pastor of Heritage Baptist Church and superintendent of Faith Christian School in Florissant, Missouri, for 31 years. He was also president of the Missouri Association of Christian Schools for 10 years. Beginning in 1977, he conducted weekly Bible studies for members of the Missouri State Legislature. He published a periodic newsletter, Understanding the Times, which focused on foreign policy, politics, education, religion, and economics. After his retirement, he continued to speak regularly in Bible conferences and Understanding the Times seminars.

Stormer credited George S. Benson with playing a major part in his awakening and political transformation. He also ascribed the selling of millions of copies of None Dare Call It Treason largely to the work of those who were awakened and trained by Benson and others in the previous few years.

Stormer had honorary degrees from Manahath School of Theology (1965) and Shelton State Community College (1976). He was a member of the John Birch Society, but he abstained from the kind of conspiracy theories which the society is known for and talked instead of a "conspiracy of shared values."

Stormer visited Vietnam twice, first in 1965, and toured many other world trouble spots on fact-finding missions.

He married Elizabeth in 1954. They settled in Florissant, Missouri, and had one daughter. Stormer died on July 10, 2018, in Troy, Missouri, at the age of 90.

== Writing career ==
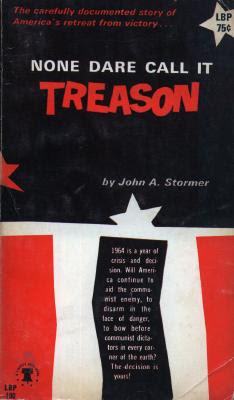
None Dare Call It Treason

Stormer's main book, None Dare Call It Treason, argued that America was losing the cold war because it was being betrayed by its elites, who were pro-communist. The title of the book is derived from an epigram of Sir John Harington: "Treason doth never prosper. What's the reason? Why if it prosper, none dare call it treason." It was published in 1964, during Barry Goldwater's bid for the presidency, and sold over one million copies in the first six months. It was distributed in bulk quantities and during the campaign six million copies were circulated. It was immensely influential with the harder-line sections of the American Right and has been described as a cult classic of the New Right. Because it was published by a private imprint, however, it never appeared on best-seller lists.

In the 1968 sequel The Death of a Nation, Stormer linked collectivism to the work of the Antichrist and discussed signs of the end times.

In 1990, Stormer published None Dare Call It Treason... 25 Years Later, which contained the original book expanded with an equally-long update. In 1989, he also wrote that perestroika and glasnost were merely Soviet propaganda tools, drawing on KGB-defector Anatoliy Golitsyn's New Lies for Old. In 1984, Golytsin predicted that some degree of retreat from hardline communism would be used by the Soviets as a way to fool the West.

His 1998 book, None Dare Call It Education, was an account of how education reforms are undermining academics and traditional values. Written from the point of view of Republican politics and evangelicalism, it claimed, with the help of statistics, a failure of American public schools to perform their stated mission.

Another book, Growing Up God's Way, a guide for getting children ready for school and life from birth on, published in 1984, is now in its 10th printing. Spanish and Russian versions have been issued. His final book, Betrayed by the Bench, detailed how judicial decisions have transformed the US Constitution, courts, and culture.

== Bibliography ==
- None Dare Call It Treason (1964)
- The Death of a Nation (1968)
- The Anatomy of a Smear (1968)
- Growing Up God's Way (1984)
- None Dare Call It Treason... 25 Years Later (1990)
- None Dare Call It Education (1998)
- Betrayed by the Bench (2005)
- Something Was Missing (2008)
