= Namwianga Mission =

Coordinates: 17°04′S 26°28′E

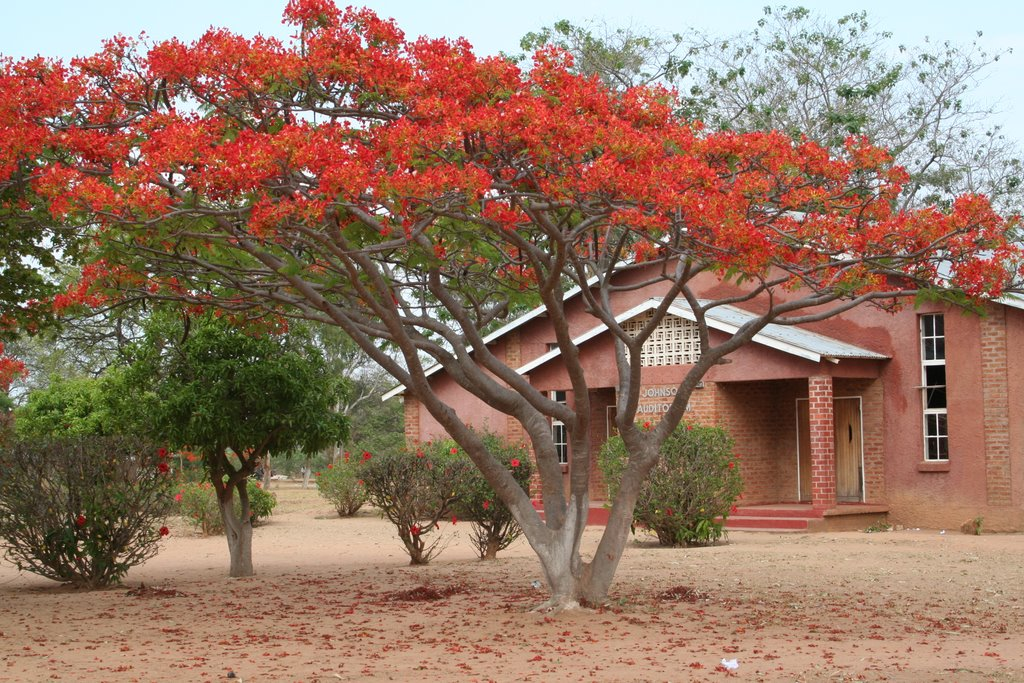
Johnson Auditorium at Namwianga Mission

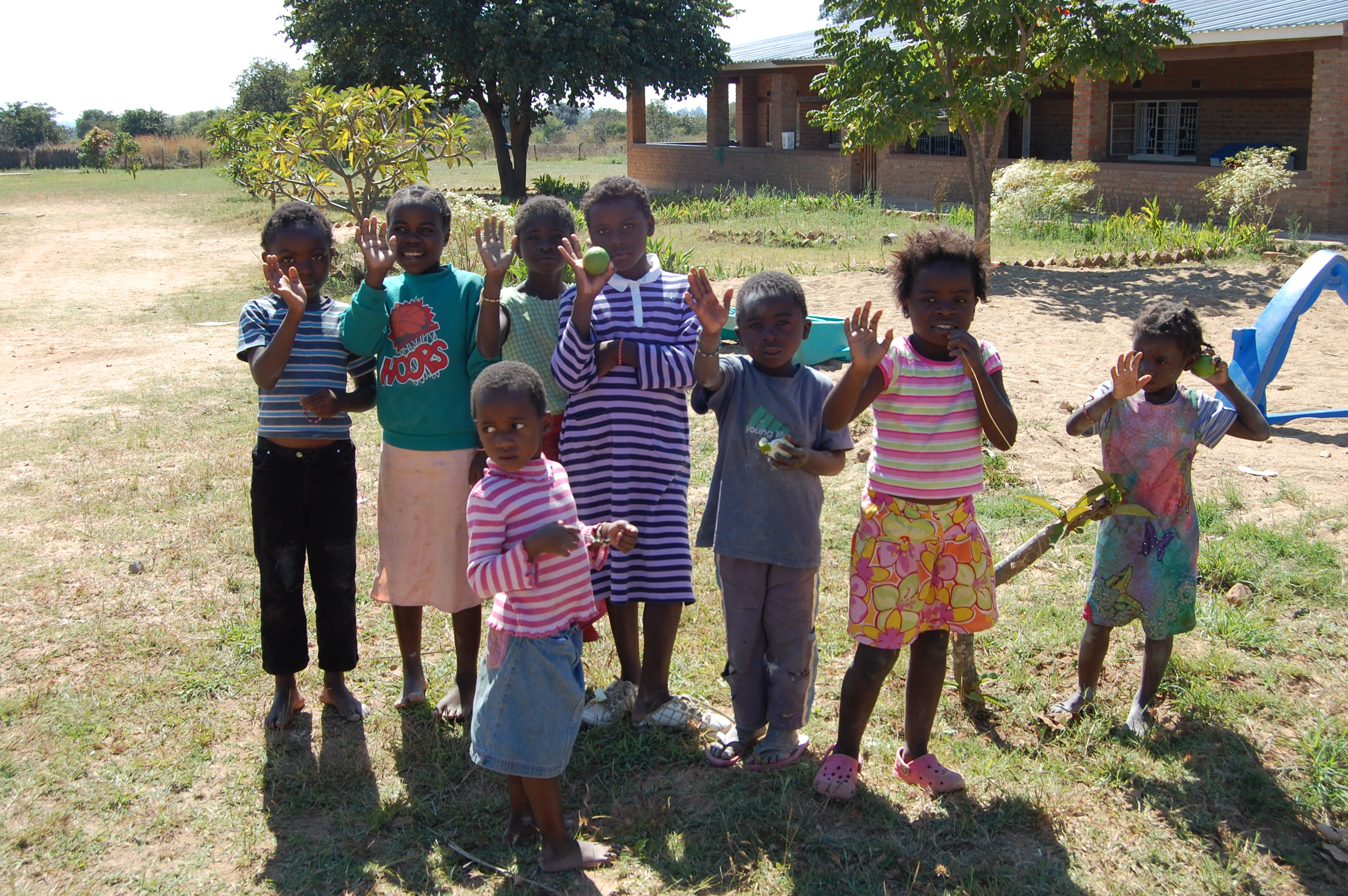
Orphans at Namwianga

The Namwianga Mission was established in 1932 in Kalomo, Zambia under the Churches of Christ with the purpose of teaching the Bible and promoting Christianity. Namwianga Mission is run by Zambia Christian College Inc, dba Zambia Mission Fund. PO BOX 3393, Abilene, Texas, 79604-3393

The mission site contains a basic (elementary) and a secondary school. The mission also supports several other basic and secondary Schools. Namwianga also contains George Benson Christian College, which trains secondary teachers in the areas of Math-Religious Education or English-Religious Education, and many graduates go on to plant churches around Zambia.

Other entities at Namwianga Mission include:

Namwianga Zonal Health Clinic

Namwianga Farm

Namwianga Christian Community Radio Station 90.5 FM

The Namiwianga Mission is also involved in orphan care. The orphanages include Eric's House, for older children and teenagers; Kelly's House, for toddlers; Eleanor's House, for newborns and babies; and the newly constructed Marjorie's House, which will house HIV/AIDS children.

Many years the church has supported Roy Merritt and his work as a full-time missionary at Namwianga Mission located in Zambia, Africa.

The General Superintendent at the Namwianga Mission is Mr. Itone Kaliyangile. The Executive Director and Stateside Superintendent is Dr. Richard Prather, and Dr. Klay Bartee is the President of the Board for Zambia Christian College Inc.
