= George S. Benson =

American missionary, college administrator, and activist

George Stuart Benson
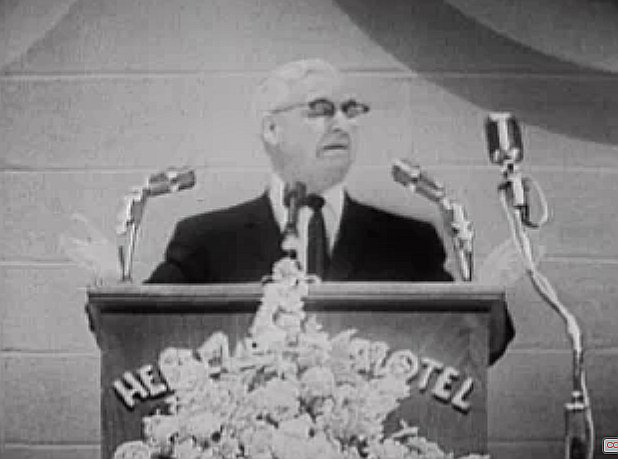
- Benson as he appeared in the Harding-produced The War We Are In, Part 2 anticommunist film, 1962.
- Born: September 26, 1898; Dewey County, Oklahoma
- Died: December 15, 1991 (aged 93); Searcy, Arkansas
- Resting place: Oak Grove Cemetery, Searcy, Arkansas
- Education: Harding College
- Occupations: Missionary; College administrator Conservative political activist
- Spouse(s): Sally Ellis Hockaday, Marguerite O’Banion
- Children: Two daughters

George Stuart Benson (September 26, 1898—December 15, 1991) was an American missionary, college administrator, and conservative political activist. After fleeing communist uprisings in China as a missionary, Benson became an anticommunist and conservative activist, taking stances against the New Deal, and later, racial integration. Benson served for many years as the president of Harding College, and oversaw a large propaganda network through his National Education Program, which sponsored short cartoons, "Freedom Forums" (gatherings of business people to promote the American way), and lecture tours for Benson.

== Early life and education ==
Benson grew up on a Dewey County, Oklahoma homestead. His parents, Stuart and Emma, were devout Christians, never missing the meetings in the Taloga schoolhouse church held by the various itinerant preachers who passed through. They instilled early the values of hard work and self-reliance, so that by age eight he worked full days on the farm. George completed eight grades in nearby Bonto and a year of high school each in Seiling and in Claremore, where his janitor job paid the rent for the shack he lived in. The year away from home in Claremore was foundational in his resolve to serve God "above all else" and "regardless of where it might lead". After three years working on the family farm and teaching in nearby schools, George completed high school in Kingfisher.

Benson attended Harper Junior College in Kansas, later to merge into Harding College, where J. N. Armstrong was then president. He went on to earn a B.A. from Harding College in 1925, a B.S. from Oklahoma A&M University, and an M.A. in history with an emphasis in Oriental studies from the University of Chicago in 1931. He received several honorary doctorates including those from Harding University, 1932; Knox College (Illinois), 1948; and Oklahoma Christian University, 1968.

== Missionary career ==
Benson started his career as a missionary to China for eleven years, 1925 to 1936. After only six months in Kwei Hsien, Communist propagandists arrived and "insisted that these intruders should be either killed or driven out". The Bensons had difficulty finding a boat to take them to Hong Kong because of threats against those who carried foreigners. After a year in Hong Kong, George Pepperdine offered them support to work in the Philippines. Benson pitched a tent in Pinamalayan and started preaching, making converts and establishing a congregation. Sixty days later, he left for Paglasan and then Baguio, where he followed a similar procedure. While passing through 30 years later, Benson "found the church at Baguio still continuing faithful to the Lord".

The Bensons returned to China in 1929, having heard that the situation there was improving. George taught English for a year at Sun Yat-sen University in Canton. Through this experience, he decided that "the most effective way to reach the Chinese people was through teaching English". Following masters studies that improved his understanding of Chinese history and culture, the Bensons returned to Canton in April 1932. Together with a growing team, they opened the Canton English Finishing School opened in February 1933, which grew to over 100 students by year-end. In 1933, the intensive Bible training short courses that had been conducted several times in 1932 were expanded and formalized as the Canton Bible School, starting with 14 full-time students. The three-year program included Chinese reading and writing in addition to the primary Bible instruction. As the students matured, they participated in evangelism work in the country, taught children's Bible classes, and taught children to read and write at a new "school for the poor" they had suggested. The English and Bible schools continued to operate until 1949. Another significant effort in Guangzhou was translating and publishing literature in the Chinese language, including an award-winning publication of J. W. McGarvey's Commentary on Acts.

Families that had joined the work in Canton included the Oldham, Davis, Whitfield, Leung, So, Ko, and Bernard families. Lowell Davis and Roy Whitfield had been in a missionary methods class at Harding that George taught winter 1931–1932 while on furlough. When Benson received Armstrong's invitation to the Harding presidency in March 1936, he was inclined to turn it down. But as the now-experienced team contemplated the quantity of missionaries that would be needed to "take the Christian message to the other great cities of China", they urged him to accept this role where he could "influence the recruitment and preparation of future missionaries for China".

After their first year in China, Sally wrote a short book, "Chats About China" to share their "first impressions" of the people in the "small part of South China" they had observed so the reader might "know something about the people on this side of the world" and "be interested in their soul salvation".

Towards the end of his career, Benson wrote "Missionary Experiences". He discusses preparation and attitude for effectively sharing the gospel, drawing on his and others' experiences in China, the Philippines, Korea, and Zambia as well as his "preparatory years" growing up in Oklahoma and in college.

== Administrative career ==
=== Harding College ===
Benson left China in 1936, at the invitation of J. N. Armstrong, to succeed him as president of Harding College. The college had not yet repaid any of its debt from the 1934 Searcy campus purchase, so its prospects were bleak. Like Western, Cordell, and Harper colleges that Armstrong had led before it, Harding was becoming insolvent. Finances were further challenged by a controversy that isolated the school from potential donors in the Churches of Christ: In 1935, President Armstrong was accused of being sympathetic to premillennialism in the Gospel Advocate and Gospel Guardian, which may have led to his resignation. Upon assuming the presidency, Benson was pressured to fire Armstrong from the Bible faculty, and then criticized in publications such as The Bible Banner when he would not. Benson traveled around the country raising money to pay the $70,000 debt and on Thanksgiving Day of 1939, Armstrong was able to toss the cancelled mortgage into a fire.

In 1940, Benson announced the next major goal would be accreditation by the North Central Association of Colleges and Schools (NCA). This would aid Harding students seeking admission to graduate schools. From 1941-1948 he "significantly strengthened faculty qualifications, increased the institution's financial resources and endowments, and undertook a costly building program." He hired retired NCA Review Board members to evaluate the school and make recommendations. The 1953 NCA reviewers recognized "a top quality faculty", fully satisfactory physical plant, "one of the most stable financial situations among small colleges", and high quality graduates. However, there was strong opposition to Benson's work with the National Education Program on the NCA Review Board,. The NCA rejected Harding's applications four times from 1948 to 1953. Continuing to engage with knowledgeable contacts, Benson learned that he could win over most of the Review Board by separating the NEP from the college. This was done in early 1954 and that March the NCA granted accreditation.

Another primary goal for Benson was increasing faculty salaries and "to retain this dedicated faculty, with its deep spiritual commitment to cultivating genuinely Christian character in students." One of the first things he did upon assuming the presidency was to establish a firm salary schedule that would be paid each month rather than paying "whatever the school could afford".

In 1937, Harding began holding "Distinguished Speaker" lectures on campus with speakers such as James L. Kraft and Charles F. Kettering. In 1943, Benson started and directed Camp Tahkodah, purchasing it himself after the board refused his suggestion that the college buy it. In 1958, the Harding Graduate School of Bible and Religion began operating on the King Estate in Memphis that had been purchased. Benson's proposal two years earlier to establish it on the Searcy campus had been rejected by a faculty vote over concerns it would lead to faculty members in other disciplines no longer being allowed to also teach Bible classes.

During Benson's 29-year presidency, Harding grew from 324 to 1228 students and 15 buildings were erected, increasing the campus value from $600,000 to $25 million. Following his 1965 retirement, he continued to assist in the development of several other Church of Christ-related institutions, including Oklahoma Christian University, Lubbock Christian College, Alabama Christian College (Now Faulkner University), and George Pepperdine College.

==== Desegregation ====
Benson resisted a 1957 effort by students and faculty to desegregate Harding, but faced with the prospect of losing federal funds, in the fall of 1963 three black students were admitted to the Searcy campus. Benson's stated reasons for opposing desegregation in 1956 were that the "community is not yet ready" and that time was required for the South to absorb the "great shock" of the Supreme Court decision. He claimed that integrating immediately would cause white students to leave Harding, and that equal educational opportunities were available for all without integration, stating "The Little Rock Nine left a far better building and their own teachers to go to Central." In a 1958 chapel speech, Benson claimed that few blacks desired to attend Harding, and that he personally provided funds to attend all-black colleges to those few that applied. Losing financial support was likely also a concern. But he especially feared that interracial marriage would follow integration, and warned of "increased destruction to properties, increased gonorrhea and syphilis, and increased pregnancies." He expressed his belief that segregation was the natural order of creation, stating "the blackbirds and bluebirds, the blue jays and mockingbirds, they don't mix and mingle together, young people!" In a 1966 sermon he maintained that "Before God, all men are equal, but in like manner there is no reason to think the Lord wants a mixing of the races and the creating of just one mongrel race. Benson also believed that black people were under the Curse of Ham, a biblical reference that was often used to cast Black people as inferior and provide theological justification for slavery and segregation. While Benson's interest in global humanitarianism and worldwide evangelism indicate that he did not harbor stringent racial animosities, his positions were used by followers who believed that their faith in God and scripture mandated segregation in order to fulfill God's will. In 1963, Benson directed Harding to grant an honorary doctorate to Senator John McClellan for his work opposing the integration of Central High School in Little Rock.

In 1957, student body president Bill Floyd circulated a "statement of attitude" that affirmed that the signers were ready to accept black students. Upon hearing of it, Benson announced in the required daily chapel that students should not sign it, yet over 85 percent of the student body and almost one hundred faculty and staff did so. Nevertheless, Benson dismissed the statement as "not an accurate expression of student feeling" and explained "they didn't understand what they were signing". The following day, students posted an ironic "whites only" sign in the lily pool, a decorative pond that serves as the central gathering place on the Searcy campus.

Harding's graduate school in Memphis admitted four black students in 1962.

Integration proceeded slowly at Harding, with blacks comprising less than 2% of the student body in 1970, and challenges in areas like roommate assignments, dating and athletics continued beyond Benson's presidency.

===== Impact of 1964 civil rights legislation =====
In 2012, Mike D. Brown wrote that Harding's 1963 decision to begin admitting black students was motivated by expectation that the coming Civil Rights Act would require "Harding to desegregate to continue receiving federal funds". Key concurs, noting that "Congress was already considering what would become the Civil Rights act of 1964", and cites the "similarly pragmatic" Seventh-day Adventist decision to desegregate in 1965, as well as observing that the Freed–Hardeman University president attributed his own school's 1964 policy change "to the mistake of accepting federal funds". Key acknowledges that "extant records do not precisely indicate" the reasoning at Harding. Hicks viewed Harding's action as "voluntary", citing a September 1963 Arkansas Gazette article: "as a private institution [Harding] faced no legal threat". The Gazette further reported that Harding was the first private college in Arkansas to integrate and editorialized "they and Dr. Benson deserve an ovation...for the grace with which they have undertaken this social change". More recently, the Arkansas Times has reported that Harding was actually second. The student newspaper article about the announcement stated: "Benson's leadership in the movement for equal opportunity makes us proud, even boastful".

Brown notes two examples that suggest Benson was not dedicated to preserving segregation: He had "turned down a lucrative offer" to start a strictly segregated college in Mississippi, and he personally raised support for the students who broke the color barrier at Harding. Brown's summary cautions against oversimplification: Benson "was marked by the segregated society in which he was raised", "feared the loss of conservative donations that would have followed early desegregation", dreaded interracial marriage, and it is unclear if he ever "acknowledged his mistakes and racial myopia". Yet, "on some level, Benson too believed that 'God was no respecter of persons.'"

=== Oklahoma Christian College (1956–67) ===
In early 1955, Central Christian College president Baird met with Benson and expressed that the school's situation in Bartlesville, Oklahoma, was hopeless. He asked for Benson's help with moving the school to Tulsa or Oklahoma City. After a year of Benson "leading and guiding the moving program", the board named him chancellor so he could represent the college on a more authoritative basis, and asked Harding to release Benson for approximately a third of his time. Benson primarily focused on fund raising, delegating day-to-day operations to President Baird. When the college sought accreditation, the North Central Examining Committee's December 1965 report was critical of the college's dual leadership, so Benson made plans to retire. Benson connected the college with major donors such as the Gaylords and Davissons.

To avoid confusion with the nearby Central State College following the move to Oklahoma City, Benson recommended changing the name to Oklahoma Christian College.

=== Zambia Christian Schools (1964–84) ===
In 1964, the newly independent Zambian government offered land to Church of Christ missionary J. D. Merritt if he would build a secondary school on it. Merritt asked Benson to help raise funds for that purpose. Namwianga Christian Secondary School opened in 1966 and Kabanga Christian Secondary School several years later. In 1989, George Benson Christian College opened as a teacher training college on the Namwianga Mission site.

Benson served as Chairman of the Board of Zambian Christian Schools until 1984. He was "heavily involved" because "he wanted a multitude of Zambians to receive an education where they would get to know Christ as their personal savior."

=== Alabama Christian College (1975–83) ===
Benson was appointed as chancellor of Alabama Christian College in 1975. He served as interim president and chief executive in 1981. During his years as chancellor, debt was reduced from $3.5 million to $1 million and college operations were strengthened.

=== National Education Program ===
At both Harper College and Oklahoma A&M, Benson displayed an interest in the mistakes that had felled great civilizations of past, taking as his debate theme "The Seventh Nation", in which America was compared with Egypt, Babylonia, Persia, Syria, Greece and Rome. Abroad, Benson observed much lower standards of living despite comparable natural resources. He concluded key differences were the stability of America's constitutional government along with innovation from its private enterprise economic system. Benson believed that only when the government is stable will individuals venture the capital that creates jobs. He also saw America's economic success as dependent on personal integrity, with that being grounded in faith in God. Benson viewed the federal government's role as "umpire" rather than "guarantor of security" that would take individual freedom to deliver that security.

As he embarked for China, Benson thought of Americans as "alert, ambitious, and hopeful", "self-reliant and "independent". Upon returning in 1936, however, he saw a "paralyzing change. Millions were on relief and their children were growing up without knowledge of any other way of life". The National Education Association had recently announced educational plans to "support President Roosevelt in taking [basic industries and utilities] over and operating them at full capacity as a unified national system". America seemed to be trending towards "the public tendency to live off the national pay roll" that had brought down the Greek and Roman democracies. Benson "promised himself that he'd do something in his small way".

Upon assuming the Harding presidency, Benson had quickly become a regular regional speaker as he raised funds. But he gained national prominence through a 1941 speech to the Congressional Ways and Means Committee. He was the 147th speaker at public hearings about how to fund the Lend Lease Act, anticipated to require a 44% increase in the federal budget. Previous speakers had urged "economy", but Benson was specific in recommending shuttering the "make-work" Civilian Conservation Corps and National Youth Administration because many jobs were available as defense industries ramped up. He also recommended a 50% cut to the Works Progress Administration, granting that relief measures were still needed for those who were not employable. Together, these cuts amounted to one third of what the Treasury had requested. His speech was well-received by the Committee and nationally, with 2 million reprints requested. Congress proceeded to pass the a tax increase without any of his recommended spending cuts, but by the end of 1943 all three agencies had been abolished.

In 1945 and 1948, Benson spoke to congressional committees opposing federal funding for state and local education. While acknowledging educational deficiencies, he argued that the real need was for local school districts to "set our own house in order, rather than asking for Federal aid to keep a disorderly house supplied with unnecessary funds". He characterized federal aid to states as merely a return of taxes paid by those states and "weighted with a group of bureaucrats and political hangers-on", and that such "aid" would lead to increased federal government control. In 1946 Benson debated Dr. Ralph Norton of Columbia University on the topic of federal aid to education.

The National Education Program (NEP) was set up as Harding's Department of National Education in 1941 and formally separated from the college in 1954. The NEP produced a variety of materials intended to advance "the facts about our economic system, our constitutional government, and our spiritual heritage". In 1954 these included the weekly "Looking Ahead" and "Listen, Americans" columns carried by 4,000 weekly newspapers and trade newspapers, a monthly bulletin mailed to 47,000 people, a weekly radio broadcast carried by 387 stations, and MGM-distributed films estimated to have been viewed by 35 million people. These animated films were produced by John Sutherland, a former Disney executive, and funded by the Sloan Foundation and included "Make Mine Freedom", "Going Places", "Meet King Joe", "Why Play Leapfrog", "Albert in Blunderland", "Adventures in Economics". These cartoons became "the most popular short subjects ever distributed by MGM. The 1965 NEP film "The Truth About Communism" was narrated by Ronald Reagan at Benson's invitation.

In 1949, the NEP conducted its first Freedom Forum to help reach Americans with "the facts about our economic system, our constitutional government, and our spiritual heritage". Forums were a mixture of lecture and workshop and organized around a theme, such as "Collectivism – History's Greatest Failure". Enrollment at the first forum was limited to 160, intended for "thought leaders" who could then educate their organization, often businesses. Speakers included Robert Andrews Millikan, Herbert Philbrick, and Fred Schwarz. Initially the forums focused on affirming "faith in God, constitutional government, and free private enterprise", but as the Cold War intensified, the focus shifted to anti-communism. In 1955, Youth Forums on Americanism were added for high school students.

Hicks assessed the NEP's effectiveness, concluding that Reagan's 1980 victory can be attributed in part to "the grassroots activism carefully nurtured by men such as George Benson with his NEP". In a message for his 80th birthday, Reagan said "Dr. Benson, more than most, recognized the parallel between that other great civilization, now lost in the dustbin of history, and what could happen to this country, and he began trying to warn all of us before any were willing to accept the warning.". Eisenhower commented, "I only wish that other colleges and universities were doing what Harding College is doing for our American way of life." Benson's work with the NEP placed him "at the nexus of the 'Radical Right'", playing a role in "the right's transformation from marginalization in the 1930s to its resurrection by the 1980s".

As the NEP grew in influence, it attracted increasing criticism. Its 1960 video "Communism on the Map" was attacked as "mingling fact and falsehood" and "misleading propaganda". 1961 articles in The New York Times, Newsweek, and Arkansas Gazette labelled the NEP as "far right" and linked it to the widely discredited John Birch Society. That June, Arkansas senator J. William Fulbright sent a memo to Secretary of Defense Robert McNamara raising concerns about use of NEP materials in the armed forces, which resulted in immediate restrictions on its use. These attacks were "permanently and seriously damaging", and the NEP saw its revenues fall by half from 1961–62 to 1962–63. In 1964, the Anti-Defamation League book "Danger on the Right" stated that the NEP was "the largest producer of radical right propaganda in the country". Harding's faculty became critical, with James Atteberry shifting from praising the NEP in a 1966 book to expressing concern in 1967 that Harding's "national image is currently political rather than Christian". Benson and the NEP viewed much of the criticism as communist subversion, becoming "somewhat less focused" on promoting free market ideology.

At the NEP, Benson worked closely with James D. Bales, Clifton L. Ganus Jr., and Glenn A. "Bud" Green. Benson helped to establish Americanism programs at several other colleges, including Kings College, George Pepperdine College, Columbia Christian College, Lubbock Christian College, Alabama Christian College and Abilene Christian College. Influential anti-communist author John Stormer credited Benson with awakening him to the dangers of liberalism.

== Honors and legacy ==
Benson was a recipient of the Tax Foundation's Distinguished Service Award in 1941. Benson was inducted into the Oklahoma Hall of Fame in 1972 and to the Oklahoma State University Hall of Fame in 1976. Benson was the Arkansas Democrat "Outstanding Arkansan" of the year in 1954, and received a Freedoms Foundation George Washington Medal from General Eisenhower in 1949.

Buildings are named in his honor at Harding University, Freed Hardeman University, and Faulkner University. There was formerly a building named for Benson at Oklahoma Christian University, where a student-led civil rights event in 1969 ultimately led to 18 students being arrested and expelled. In 2020, Oklahoma Christian removed Benson's name from the building because of his segregationist views.

== Personal life ==
He married Sally Ellis Hockaday in 1925, and within a week they left for China. Two daughters, Mary Ruth and Lois were born in Hong Kong.

Sally Ellis died December 17, 1981. On February 22, 1983, George married his long-time secretary Marguerite O'Banion.

== Bibliography ==
- Hicks, L. Edward (1994). Sometimes in the Wrong But Never in Doubt: George Benson and the Education of the New Religious Right. Knoxville. ISBN 0-87049-865-7.
- Stevens, John C. (1991). Before Any Were Willing: The Story of George S. Benson. Searcy, AR.
- Donald P. Garner (1963), George S. Benson: Conservative, Anti-Communist, Pro-American Speaker, Ph.D dissertation, Wayne State Univ.
- Altman, Ted (1970), The Contributions of George S. Benson to Christian Education, Ed.D dissertation, North Texas University
