= Clifton L. Ganus Jr. =

American theologian and educator (1922–2019)

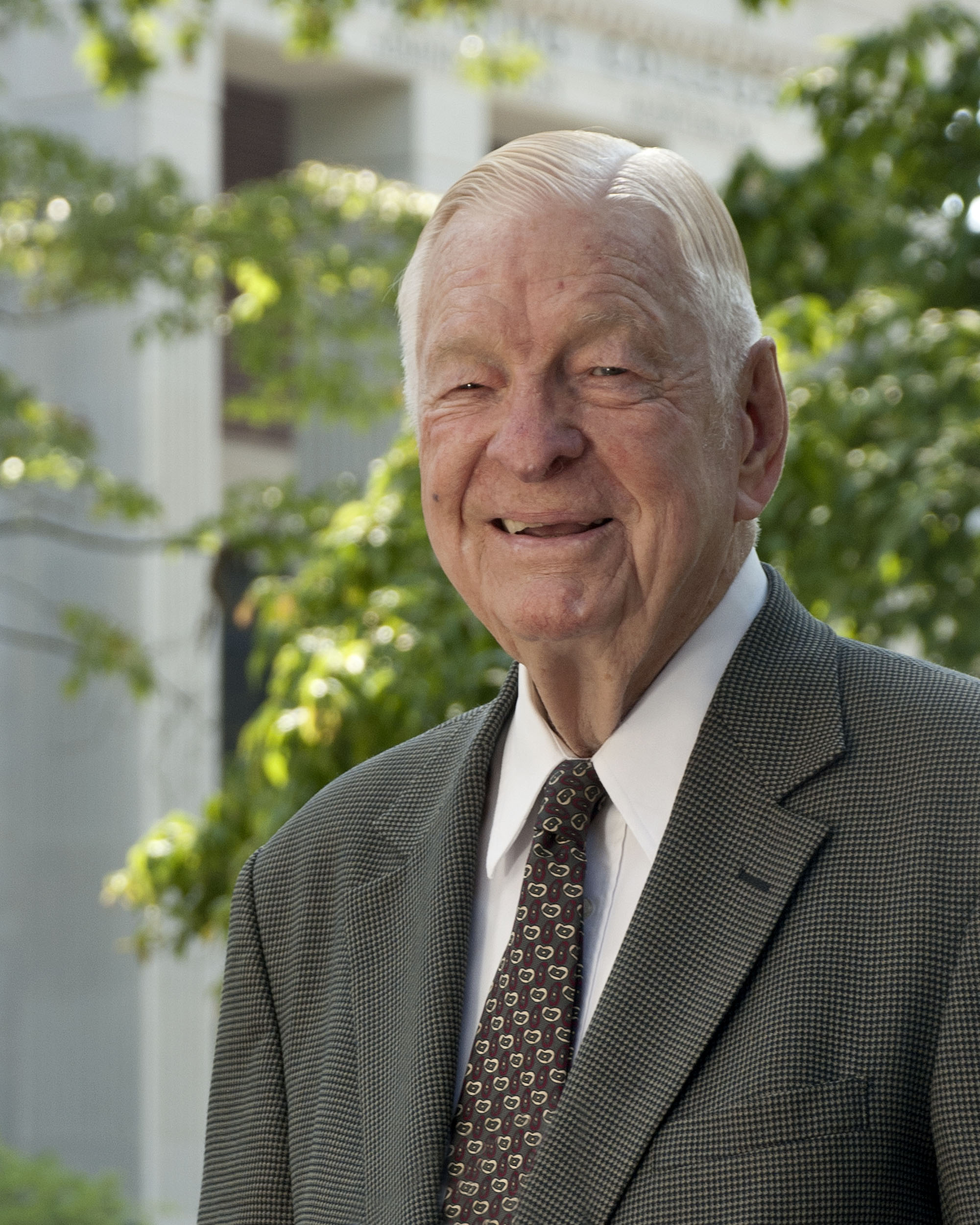

Clifton L. Ganus Jr. (April 7, 1922 – September 9, 2019) was an American theologian and educator. He served as the third president of Harding College in Searcy, Arkansas from 1965 to 1987. He was closely associated with National Education Program, a conservative organization within the university that was later known as the American Studies Program. The involvement of Ganus and President Benson was with this group continued until 1954, when they disassociated with the group in order for the school to gain accreditation. He previously was a professor of history, chair of the department of history and social science, and vice president of the college. Ganus died in Searcy, Arkansas in September 2019 at the age of 97.

== Early life ==
Ganus was born in Hillsboro, Texas, in April 1922. In 1929 his family moved to New Orleans, where his father founded Finest Foods, Incorporated, developing a successful chain of restaurants and cafeterias along with a sandwich distribution business. Ganus enrolled at Harding College in 1939, majoring in Bible and history. He graduated in May 1943 and preached in Charleston, Mississippi, for two years before going to Tulane University in New Orleans, where he earned his M.A. in 1946, followed by a Ph.D. in history from Tulane University in 1953.

== Career ==
Ganus returned to Harding in 1946 to teach history and Bible. He served as chairman of the history department and as vice president (1955–1965) before becoming president of Harding (1965–1987) after the retirement of George S. Benson.

He created the President's Development Council and Associated Women for Harding organizations to recruit students, raise money and serve as ambassadors for Harding. Under Ganus' leadership, Harding attained university status in 1979. New programs were begun as well: a NASA research program, the social work program, the Christian Communication program for preacher training, the nursing program, the Doctor of Ministry degree at Harding Graduate School of Religion in Memphis (now Harding School of Theology), the study abroad program in Italy, and the Walton Scholars program.

Ganus was a catalyst behind Harding's 1957 resumption of intercollegiate athletics and one of the biggest supporters of Bisons athletics. As such, the board of trustees named the physical education complex in honor of Ganus upon his retirement as University president in 1987, making it the Ganus Athletic Center. In 1969 in response to pressure from student groups, Ganus made plans to hire Black teachers, but continued the policy of informing the parents of any students involved in interracial dating.

Ganus became the first chancellor of Harding in 1987.

After leaving the presidency of Harding, Ganus traveled extensively, lectured at universities in Romania and China, and served as a representative of the Church of Christ to government officials in Uganda and Poland. After helping to secure governmental permission for a group of Harding alumni to serve as a mission team in Jinja, Uganda, in 1994, he founded and funded a secondary Christian school in Nawangoma, Uganda, visiting that country on 27 trips.

== Controversies ==
During his early teaching years at Harding, Ganus served as a lecturer with the National Education Program, an institution that had been established by Benson to promote his view of American political and economic policies. Ganus traveled to speak at the program's Freedom Forums in a number of states, narrated films, and spoke at events on campus. Under pressure from the college's accrediting agency, the NEP was ultimately separated from the school, and it was decried by Senator J. William Fulbright in his "Fulbright Memorandum" of 1961 to Secretary of Defense Robert McNamara. Benson retained his role as NEP president after leaving the college in 1965.

Ganus wrote letters to parents of interracial dating couples and counseled about prospective difficulties in interracial marriages, although he stated that he did not oppose interracial dating and that he would not object to his daughter's marrying someone of a different race. In the spring of 1969, responding to a list of requests from students and faculty, Ganus spoke in Harding's chapel on race relations at the school. A group of about 20 walked out during the second chapel service, protesting a perceived lack of progress in interracial relations and recruitment of black students and faculty

Ganus later made many trips to the Caribbean and to Latin America to recruit students. One of those recruits who attended Harding was Botham Jean, from St. Lucia, who was killed in Dallas in 2018. Ganus was invited to speak at the funeral.
