= Harding University =

Private university in Searcy, Arkansas, US

- Former names: Harper College (1915–1924); Arkansas Christian College (1919–1924); Harding College (1924–1979)
- Motto: Inspired Purpose
- Type: Private university
- Established: 1924; 102 years ago
- Religious affiliation: Churches of Christ
- Academic affiliations: Space-grant
- Endowment: $229 million (2025)
- President: Mike Williams
- Provost: Marty Spears
- Faculty: 314
- Students: 4,879
- Location: Searcy, Arkansas, United States; 35°14′52″N 91°43′38″W
- Campus: Suburban, 350 acres (140 ha)
- Colors: Black and Gold
- Nickname: Bisons
- Sporting affiliations: NCAA Division II – GAC
- Website: harding.edu
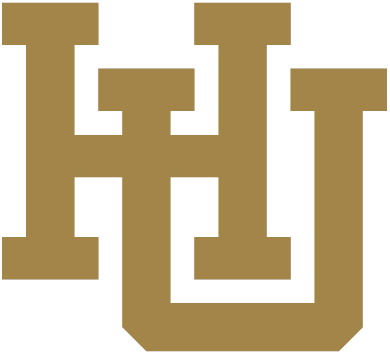

Harding University is a private Christian university in Searcy, Arkansas, United States. Established in 1924, Harding is associated with the Churches of Christ.

== History ==
=== Foundation ===
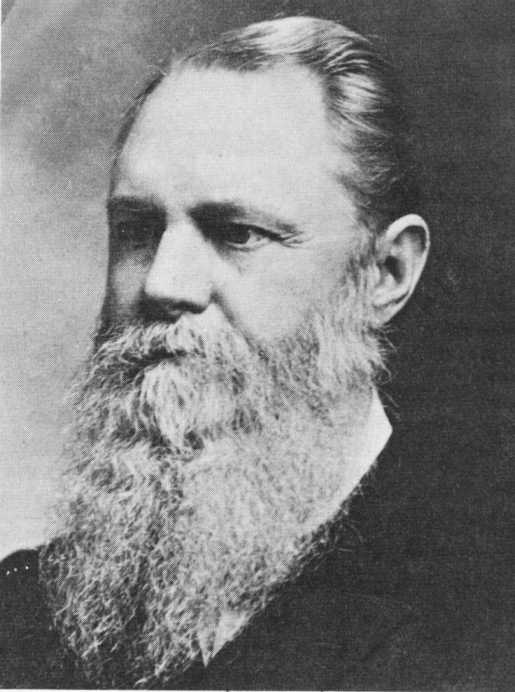
James A. Harding

Harding College was founded in Morrilton, Arkansas, in April 1924 after the merging of two separate colleges: Arkansas Christian College of Morrilton, Arkansas, and Harper College of Harper, Kansas. It was named after James A. Harding, a minister and educator associated with Churches of Christ.

After Galloway Female College merged with Hendrix College in 1933, Harding College purchased Galloway's Searcy, Arkansas campus for a fraction of its estimated value and moved there in 1934.

=== Cold War ===
Harding University first advocated pacifism and political disengagement, in line with its own founding influences like James A. Harding and David Lipscomb as well as with wider trends in many other evangelical Christian movements during late 19th- and early 20th-century America. This trajectory shifted during the Cold War, however. Harding became involved in the production of a series of animated cartoons extolling the virtues of free-market capitalism. This series, including "Make Mine Freedom" (1948) as well as "Meet King Joe" (1949), were all produced by John Sutherland Productions as part of a concerted campaign to fight against the threats of communism at the beginning of the Cold War using popular media. Funding came from Alfred P. Sloan, the major figure at General Motors Corporation. The animations contrast mainstream American values with the values of Soviet communism. The initiative represented a central concern of Harding president George S. Benson, who believed that fighting socialism was a moral imperative.

=== National Education Program ===
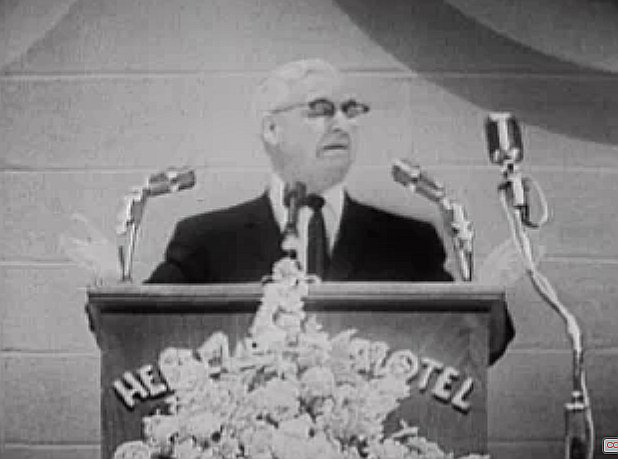
Dr George S Benson, president of Harding College, in 1962

Early in his career, President Benson established the National Education Program to advocate the principles of belief in God, the constitution, and free enterprise, within an "Americanism" program. The NEP coordinated speaking engagements and produced and distributed reprints of Benson's speeches and newspaper columns, short films by a former Walt Disney employee, and other media. This program attracted many donations to Harding, including from Boeing and Gulf Oil. The NEP was initially part of the school's education department, and later the history department, where it was intertwined with the American Studies Program. Clifton Ganus Jr. and James D. Bales were also heavily involved.

NEP materials were used nationwide by groups such as the U.S. armed forces, public schools, colleges and universities, chapters of the American Legion, and local chambers of commerce. Some uses became controversial: Some companies required their employees to attend NEP-sponsored seminars and enclosed copies of Benson's lectures with their paychecks in hopes of addressing perceived restlessness. The Fulbright Memorandum of June 1961 raised concerns about use of NEP materials in the military. The NEP was charged with being a "Radical Right" organization in the 1964 book Danger on the Right by Arnold Forster and Benjamin R. Epstein of the Anti-Defamation League, which Bales responded to in his 1965 book Americanism under Fire. The close relationship between Harding and the NEP delayed the college's accreditation until 1954 when the school incorporated it as a separate entity, although Benson, Ganus, and Bales continued their involvement and the NEP board was nearly identical to the college's. In the 1970s, the program dwindled in notoriety and moved to Oklahoma Christian College. The American Studies Institute continues as a legacy of this program.

=== Race relations ===
==== Segregation ====
During the era of segregation in the United States, the school remained racially segregated for most of the tenure of president George S. Benson, who defended Harding's delay in integrating. Benson believed Black people were inferior because they fell under the Curse of Ham.

In 1957, student body president Bill Floyd circulated a "statement of attitude" that Harding was ready to integrate, and it was signed by over 75% of the students, faculty, and staff of the college. In response Benson made an address entitled "Harding College and the Colored Problem", in which he characterized the idea of integration as youthful idealism, and insisted that students should defer to the judgment of older people with more experience, such as the Harding board of trustees.

He went further, stating that Black people were far better off in the US than in other countries, and that integration would result in destruction of property, the spread of venereal diseases, and increased pregnancies. He also stated that mixed marriages would lead to broken homes and a rise in crime. Benson maintained that mixing of the races was against the divine order.

In 1953, Norman Adamson became the first black person accepted to Harding. However, when administrators learned he was black he was denied admission.

In 1963, three black students were admitted to the Searcy campus, making Harding the second private institution in Arkansas to admit black people. In a 2012 article, it was suggested that this decision was motivated by expectation that the coming Civil Rights Act would require "Harding to desegregate to continue receiving federal funds", but contemporary sources make no mention of this as a consideration: The Arkansas Gazette applauded Harding's "voluntary action" as an "example" for other Arkansas church-related colleges and deserving an "ovation...for the grace with which they have undertaken this social change". The Bison proclaimed "Benson's leadership in the movement for equal opportunity makes us proud, even boastful; it makes us happy, even ecstatic", though at least one scholar viewed that statement "dubiously".

By 1969 Harding had only 20 black students out of a student body of over 2,000. While president Clifton L. Ganus, Jr, stated that he did not "see any Biblical injunction against it", he discouraged interracial relationships. Under his leadership, the Harding administration allowed students to enter into interracial relationships, but made it policy to caution them against it and informed their parents in writing. The policy of allowing such relationships was the focus of much anger from the families of some white students. In 1969, three black students who protested racism at the university were expelled. In 1969, Ganus attempted to placate students by promising to hire 'Negro' teachers, but this never happened.

==== Since the Civil Rights Era ====
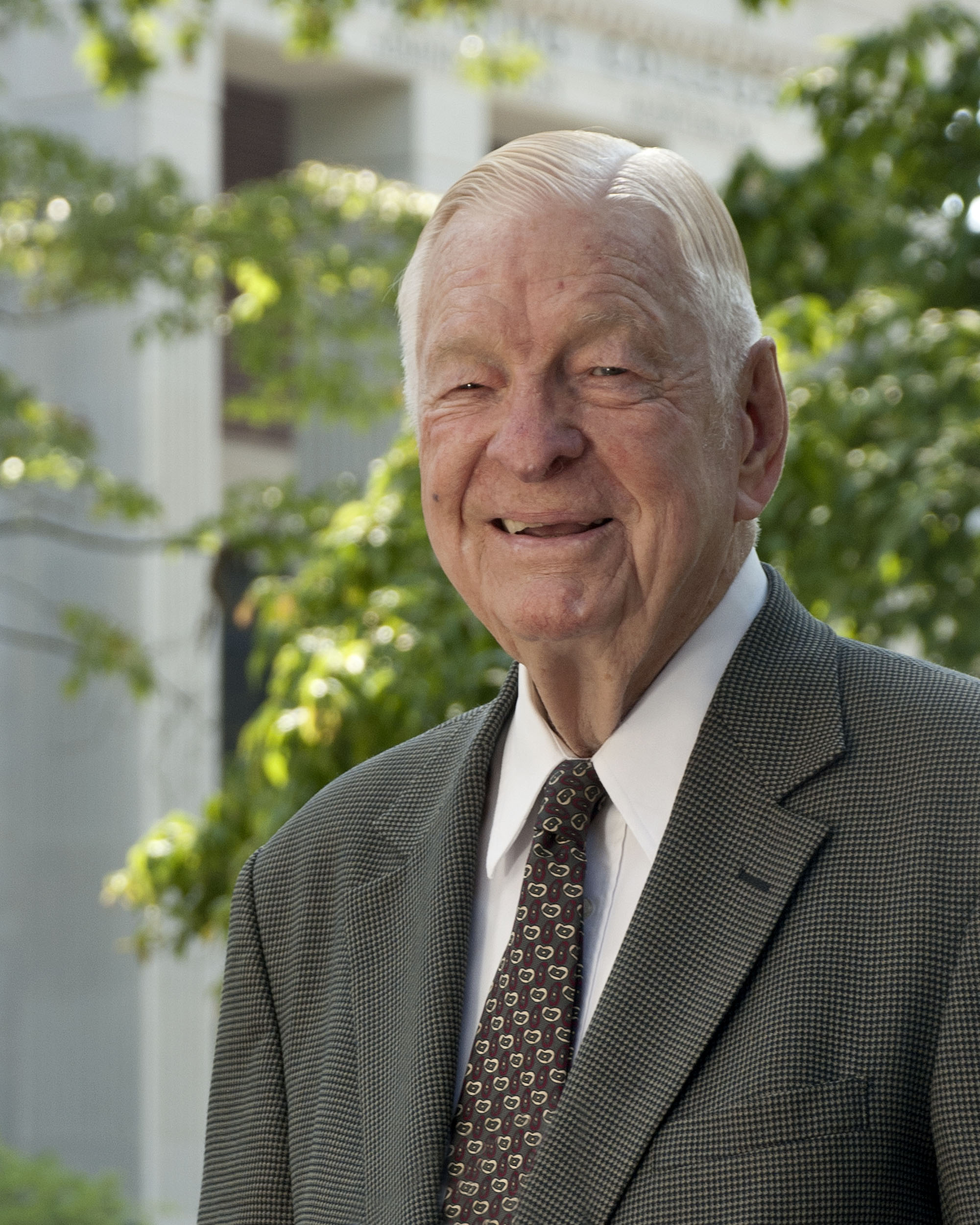
Harding alumnus Clifton L. Ganus Jr.

In 1980, Richard King became the first African-American faculty member. In the fall of 2019, white students constituted 81 percent of the student body, 4.7% were black students, and 3.8% were Hispanic/Latino.

==== Botham Jean and the Benson Auditorium ====
In 2020, a former graduate organized a petition drive to rename the Benson auditorium because of Benson's racist views. The petition also asked that the auditorium carry the name of Botham Jean instead, a recent Black alumnus who had been murdered in his own apartment by a white Dallas police officer who alleged she had confused their apartments and mistaken the 26-year-old for a burglar.

Upon review, but against the wishes of the Black Student Association, the university, under the leadership of Bruce McLarty, defended Benson and chose to retain the name. However, President McLarty recognized the university had no buildings or landmarks on campus that recognized Black Alumni and promised some sort of memorial to Botham Jean within a year.

Facing this controversy and a 23% decline in enrollment over 5 years, the board dismissed McLarty, with former president David Burks resuming control. Michael D. Williams became president June 2022.

== Campus ==
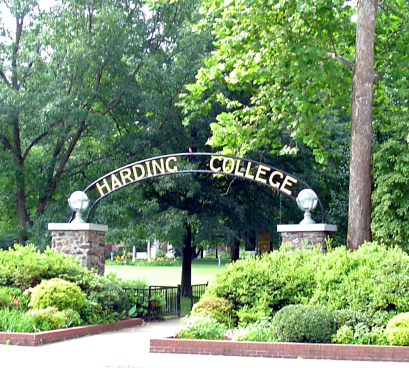
The Original Harding College Arch.

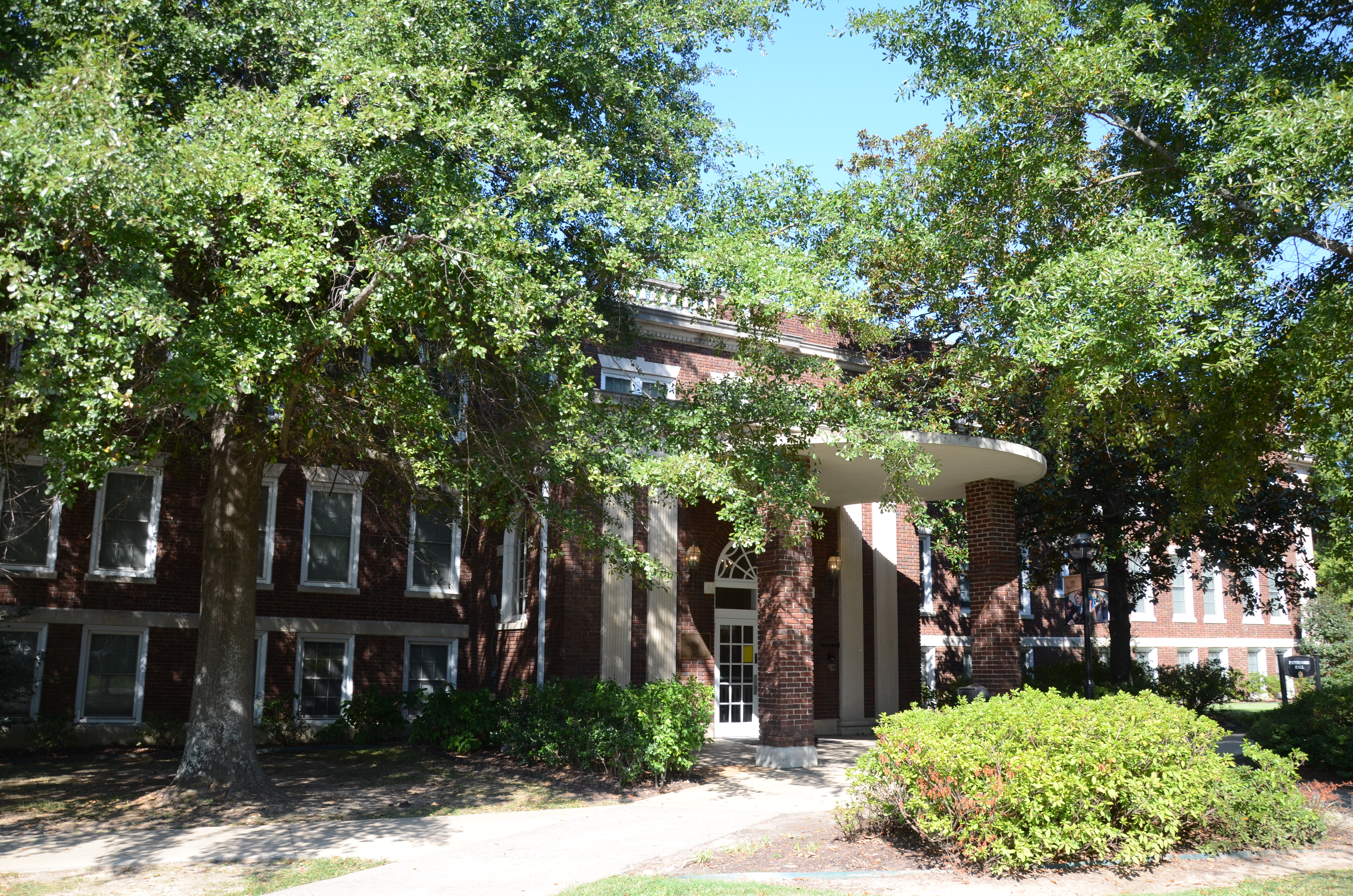
Pattie Cobb Hall

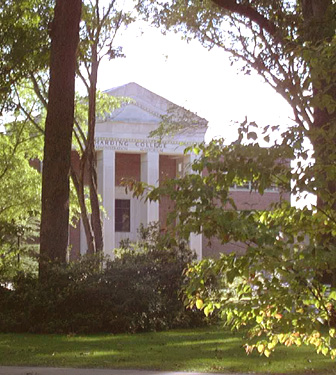
The Administration Building of Harding University.

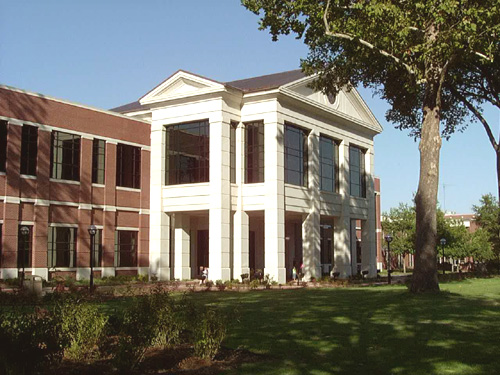
The David B. Burks American Heritage Building on the Harding University campus.

=== Searcy ===
The Searcy campus comprises 48 buildings located on 350 acres (140 ha) near the center of Searcy. The campus lies roughly between Race Avenue and Beebe-Capps Expressway and includes several other minor thoroughfares, the campus of Harding Academy, Harding Place (a retirement community), and portions of surrounding neighborhoods.

The campus includes the George S. Benson Auditorium, which sits facing the McInteer Bible and World Missions Center. Brackett Library, the American Studies Building (Education and English departments), the David B. Burks American Heritage Building (hotel and offices), Pattie Cobb Hall, and the Administration Building frame a grassy central commons area upon which can be found several paths, a fountain, and a bell tower made out of bricks from the institution that once stood there: Galloway Female College.

Recent additions have included several dormitories; expansions of the cafeteria, student center, art department, and the David B. Burks American Heritage Building. The McInteer Bible and World Missions Center, was built in a project that included closing a road and creating a pedestrian mall.

After competing in the Ganus Athletic Center from 1976 until 2006, Harding's volleyball and basketball teams moved back to the Rhodes-Reaves Field House. The field house is a round-topped airplane hangar built for France in WWII, and purchased as war surplus by George S. Benson. It was reconstructed on campus in 1947. In 2007, it was retrofitted to accentuate the acoustics of the facility, working to the advantage of the home teams. The campus also has intramural sports facilities, including an indoor facility built for the Harding Bison football team in 2019.

=== Noteworthy buildings ===
The Dean L.C. Sears House, named for the first dean of Harding University, was a historic house registered in the National Register of Historic Places. Also on the registry is Pattie Cobb Hall.

The Reynolds Center was created through and named for philanthropist Donald W. Reynolds.

=== Satellite campuses and campuses abroad ===
The university maintains satellite campuses in Arkansas, one in North Little Rock and a second in Rogers.

Harding maintains permanent campuses in Florence and Athens. Study abroad semester programs are also provided in Brisbane, London, Paris, Arequipa (Peru), and Kalomo (Zambia).

== Academics ==
=== Organization ===
Structurally, the university comprises eight separate colleges: the College of Allied Health, College of Arts & Sciences, the College of Bible & Ministry, the Paul R. Carter College of Business Administration, the Cannon-Clary College of Education, the Carr College of Nursing, the College of Pharmacy, and the Honors College. Each college has its own subdivisions of departments or other sections. The university also has a School of Theology and Graduate School of Business. Between these ten colleges, the university provides 110+ majors, 10 undergraduate degrees, 14 pre-professional programs, and 40+ graduate and professional degrees.

==== American Studies Institute ====
In 1953, Harding established the School of American Studies as an extension of President Benson's National Education Program in order to teach and train students in the founding principles of the United States Constitution. Rebranded the American Studies Institute (ASI), the center supplements students' academic training and promotes "a complete understanding of the institutions, values, and ideas of liberty and democracy." In doing so, the ASI exhibits a generally conservative political stance, focused on going "back to the fundamental values that made this country great."

=== Distinctions and rankings ===
Harding supports a chapter of Kappa Omicron Nu, a national honor society for colleges and universities with a strong humanities program. The university was distinguished through the National Historic Chemical Landmarks program of the American Chemical Society for its contribution to the history of chemistry, which came for its William-Miles History of Chemistry Collection, established in 1992.

Harding University was listed among the Top Twenty Schools nationwide by the Wall Street Journal and Times Higher Education under two different categories in 2017: student engagement and student inspiration. Harding consistently ranks in the Top 50 for Best Regional Universities in the South according to the U.S. News & World Report. In 2020, it ranked #349 among national universities overall. It was also rated at B by the American rankings and review company Niche.

Harding is accredited by the Higher Learning Commission. Specific colleges and programs have received further accreditation by specialized agencies as well.

== Student life ==
=== Athletics ===
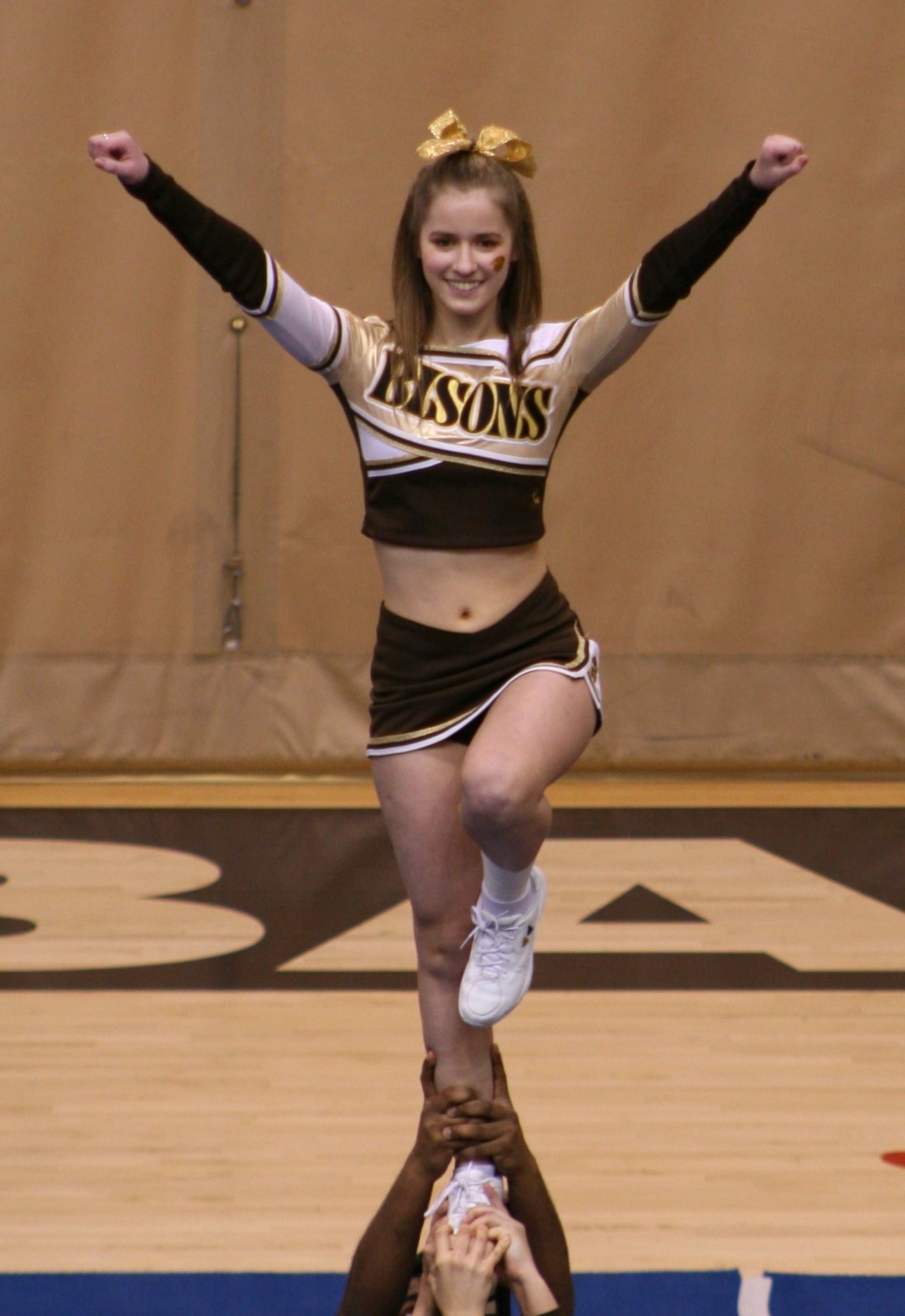
Bison cheerleader cheering on the crowd

Harding has competed in the National Collegiate Athletic Association (NCAA) at the Division II level since 1997, beginning in the Lone Star Conference moving in 2000 to the Gulf South Conference and then moving to the newly formed Great American Conference (GAC) in 2011. Men's sports include Soccer, Baseball, Basketball, Cross Country, Football, Golf, Tennis, and Track and Field. Women's sports include Basketball, Cheerleading, Cross Country, Golf, Soccer, Softball, Tennis, Track and Field, and Volleyball.

The facilities for the sporting events are: First Security Stadium, Ganus Activities Complex, Stevens Soccer Complex, Jerry Moore Field (baseball), Berry Family Grandstand (softball), Harding Tennis Complex, and the Rhodes-Reaves Field House. On October 19, 2019, the new indoor football facility was dedicated in honor of longtime football head coach Ronnie Huckeba. The Huckeba Field House is the largest indoor practice facility in NCAA Division II and one of the largest in the country for any level. Harding won the Division II national championship in football in 2023.

=== Spring Sing ===
Spring Sing is an annual musical production held during Easter Weekend, featuring performances by the social clubs. It is widely attended by current and prospective students, alumni, and Searcy residents. An estimated 12,000 people attended the show each year.

Each year, an overall theme is selected, and each club develops music and choreographed routines for the show. Rehearsals begin as early as January.

Spring Sing also typically features two hosts, two hostesses, and a general song and choreography ensemble, with these roles chosen by audition. The ensemble performs to music played by the University Jazz Band. Each club act is judged and, according to their performance, awarded a sum of money. The clubs then donate this money to charities of their choice.

=== Student-run media ===
The Department of Communications runs the state radio station KVHU.

Alongside publications of the university itself, such as the alumni newsletter Harding Magazine and the yearbook The Petit Jean, students produce their own periodical during the academic year called The Bison. This student-run publication is printed in nine issues per semester and made available through its multimedia website The Link.

==== LGBTQ media ====
In 2011 a group of LGBTQ students at Harding, known as "HU Queer Press", produced a zine called State of the Gay whose website was blocked by the university. A statement from university officials at the time said that "university administrators felt that having this website available on campus goes against [our] mission and policies". President David Burks called the publication "offensive and degrading". As a result of this decision by the administration, the controversy received attention from national media such as The New York Times, The New Yorker, and The Huffington Post, and online platforms like Jezebel.

In 2018, HU Queer Press 2.0 was launched, with members producing a zine titled Hear Queer Voices aiming to "foster a relationship between Harding University and the queer community". In April 2022, HU Queer Press 3.0 was announced, with members releasing a zine titled Look Around, requesting "that Harding University fully acknowledge, affirm, and protect its LGBT students".

=== Social clubs ===
The university sponsors student-led "social clubs" that serve a similar social networking function to the Greek system, as Harding prohibits formation of local chapters of national social fraternities and sororities. (One exception is Delta Phi, a chapter of Pi Sigma Epsilon). Currently there are 14 women's social clubs and 14 men's social clubs at Harding.

Most of these organizations have adopted Greek letter names that are similar to national fraternity and sorority names. Social clubs are open to all academically eligible students and serve as some of the university's most visible student-led organizations. The clubs are a prominent part of student life with slightly more than half of all undergraduate students participating as social club members.

The social club induction process begins when clubs host "receptions" in the fall to recruit new members. The membership process culminates in Club Week, when each prospective member bonds with the other members of the club through a series of scheduled activities throughout the week. Once a student is accepted into the club, they attend biweekly meetings and can participate in club-sponsored sports, service projects, and Spring Sing.

==== Hazing controversy ====
Harding's social clubs have been involved in hazing controversies over the years. As a result, some have been forced to disband, including the Seminoles (2010), Kappa Sigma Kappa (2005), Mohicans (1981), and most recently Pi Kappa Epsilon (2015).

== Religious conduct and policies ==
Students at Harding University are expected to maintain the highest standards of Christian morality, integrity, orderliness and personal honor. Harding reserves the right to refuse admittance or dismiss any student whose lifestyle is not consistent with the Christian principles that Harding represents.

=== Employment ===
The Faculty Handbook, with narrow exceptions, requires Churches of Christ membership of all faculty members. All faculty members must affirm as part of an annual evaluation that he or she is a member in good standing of a Church of Christ and attends services weekly.

=== Chapel and Bible classes ===
The university specifies that daily chapel service be held with attendance mandatory for undergraduate students. Chapel programs are "designed to stimulate intellectual, religious, social or aesthetic development," in accordance with the university's mission of combining " faith, learning and living." Excessive absences from daily chapel service may result in disciplinary action.

Harding requires each student enrolled in nine or more hours to regularly attend one Bible class that meets at least three hours a week each semester. Attendance is mandatory, and nonattendance may result in suspension from the university. The university requires students and faculty to dress professionally when attending class, chapel, lyceum, and American Studies programs.

=== Alcohol and substance use ===
The consumption, possession or storage of alcoholic beverages of any kind is prohibited at Harding University. This prohibition includes on-campus or off-campus locations. Violation of this policy will result in suspension from the university. White County, Arkansas, where Harding is located, is a dry county. The use of nicotine in any form is not permitted at any time, including use of electronic cigarettes or vaporizers. Harding also forbids the use, possession, distribution, or sale of drugs or drug-related paraphernalia.

=== Student living ===
Single undergraduate students, under the age of 22, are required to live on campus, with limited exceptions. Visiting in the residence of a single member of the opposite sex, even though others are present, without permission from a student life dean, is prohibited. Staying overnight in a residence, motel, hotel, or any such arrangement with a member of the opposite sex, without permission from a student life dean, will result in suspension, although explicit sexual immorality may not have been observed.

Students are not to visit "inappropriate" places of entertainment such as dance clubs or bars. Students are not allowed to participate in suggestive or social dancing.

All-campus curfew is from 12:00 a.m. until 5 a.m. Sunday through Thursday and 1:00 a.m. until 5 a.m. Friday and Saturday.

=== Sex and gender ===
Harding explicitly regulates sexual relationships among students and staff. The university explicitly prohibits premarital, extramarital, and homosexual sex.

According to the university's student handbook:

Harding University holds to the biblical principle that God instituted marriage as a relationship between one man and one woman and that gender identity is given by God and revealed in one's birth sex. Students are prohibited from being married to or dating a person of the same sex. Neither may students engage in behavior suggesting a romantic relationship with a person of the same sex. The University further holds to the biblical principle that sexual relationships outside the context of marriage are unacceptable to God and immoral. Sexual immorality in any form will result in suspension from the University.

Harding also forbids the "unwelcome or inappropriate emphasizing of sexual identity."

In 2017, it was granted an exception to Title IX, which allows for legal discrimination against LGBTQ+ students on religious grounds. Harding has been listed among the "Absolute Worst Campuses for LGBTQ Youth" in the US by Campus Pride.

== People ==
=== Notable faculty, current and former ===
- Carl Allison, football and baseball coach
- Stanley Jennings Carpenter, Medical Entomologist, U.S. Army Colonel
- James W. Carr, professor of business and member of the National Security Education Board
- James Burton Coffman, preacher, author
- James Dickey, basketball coach. Played and coached at Harding.
- Ronnie Huckeba, football coach
- Paul Fiser, football coach
- Jack P. Lewis, theologian
- John Robert McRay, biblical scholar
- Michael A. O'Donnell, psychologist
- Thomas H. Olbricht, biblical scholar
- Carroll D. Osburn, theologian and noted biblical scholar
- John Prock, football coach
- Cheri Yecke, educator and civil servant in the Bush administration

=== Presidents ===
- J.N. Armstrong (1924–1936)
- George S. Benson (1936–1965)
- Clifton L. Ganus Jr. (1965–1987)
- David Burks (1987–2013)
- Bruce McLarty (2013–2020)
- David Burks (2020-2022)
- Mike Williams (2022–present)
