= Abilene Christian University =

Christian university in Abilene, Texas, US

Coordinates: 32°28′10″N 99°42′29″W

- Former names: Childers Classical Institute (1906–1920); Abilene Christian College (1920–1976)
- Motto: People With A Purpose
- Type: Private university
- Established: 1906
- Religious affiliation: Church of Christ
- Academic affiliations: CCCU; NAICU
- Endowment: $1 billion (FY2026)
- Chancellor: Royce Money
- President: Phil Schubert
- Provost: Susan Lewis
- Faculty: 450
- Students: 7,877
- Undergraduates: 5,522
- Postgraduates: 2,255
- Location: Abilene, Texas, United States
- Campus: Urban, 208 acres (84 ha)
- Colors: Purple and white
- Nickname: Wildcats
- Sporting affiliations: NCAA Division I FCS – WAC; UAC
- Mascot: Willie the Wildcat
- Website: www.acu.edu

Abilene Christian University (ACU) is a private Christian research university in Abilene, Texas, United States. It is classified by the Carnegie Foundation as an R2 (High Research Spending and Doctorate Production) institution. It was founded in 1906 as Childers Classical Institute. It is affiliated with Churches of Christ.

== History ==
The Churches of Christ in Abilene founded it as a Christian university for West Texas. Childers Classical Institute opened in 1906, with 25 students. It initially included a lower school starting in the seventh grade.

When Jesse P. Sewell became president of the institute in 1912, the school began using Abilene Christian College on all its printed material. In 1920, the school formally changed the name.

The Optimist, the university's student-produced newspaper, was founded in 1912. The Prickly Pear, the school yearbook, was founded in 1916. The campus literary-arts magazine (now The Shinnery Review, formerly The Pickwicker) has been in production since 1933.

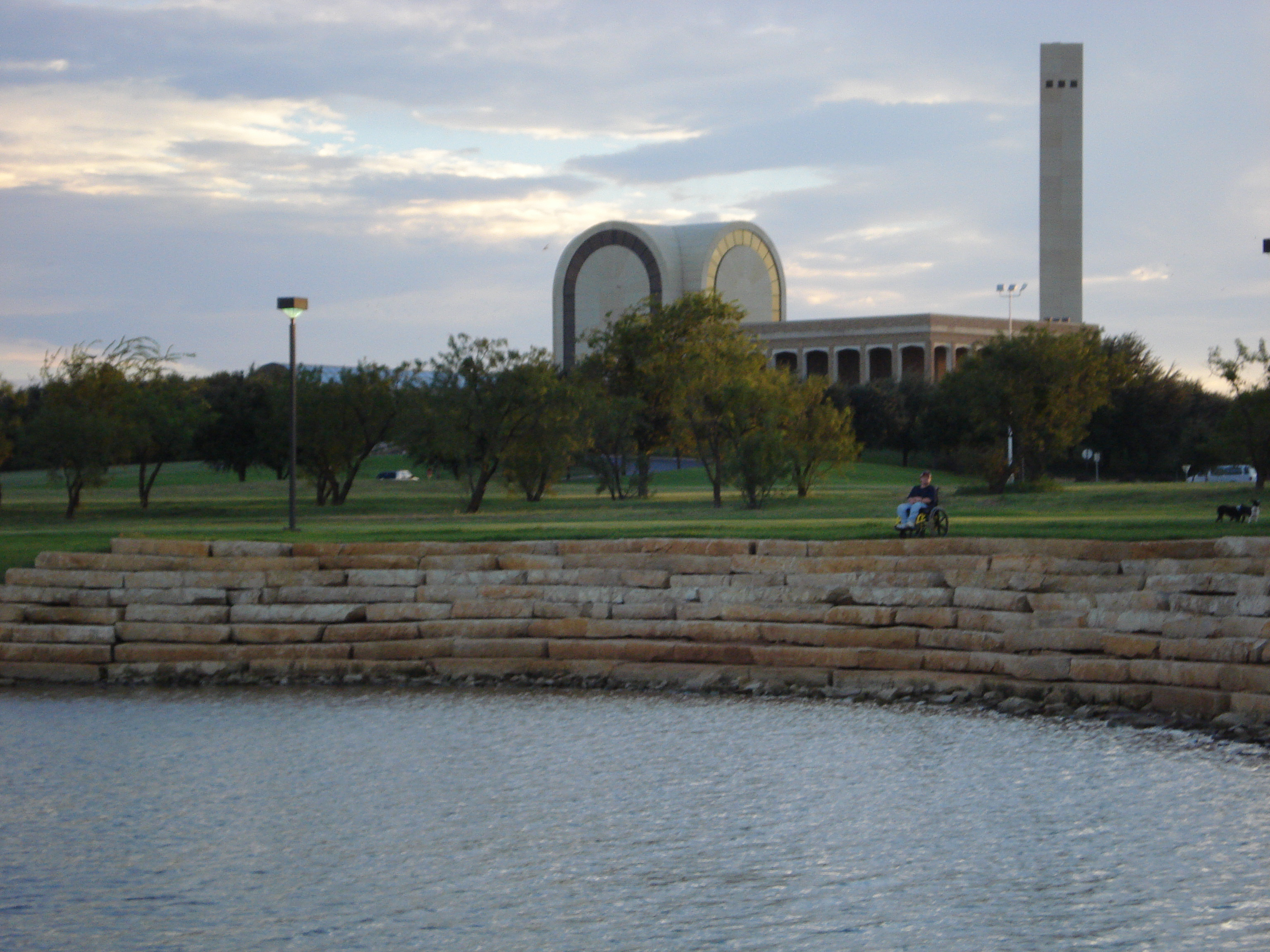
ACU's Onstead-Packer Bible Studies Building, Chapel on the Hill and Tower of Light seen from Faubus Fountain Lake

Abilene Christian College first received school accreditation in 1951, when it became an accredited member of the Commission on Colleges of the Southern Association of Colleges and Schools.

Amberton University, previously Amber University, was created as an extension campus of Abilene Christian University. It was launched in Mesquite, Texas, in 1971, moving to Garland, Texas, in 1974. It became a separate institution as Amber University in 1982, and was rechristened Amberton University in 2001. Like Abilene Christian University, Amberton remains affiliated with the Churches of Christ.

On February 22, 1976, the name of Abilene Christian College was changed to Abilene Christian University. The university celebrated its centennial in the 2005–06 school year. In July 2015, the university signed a lease for an expansion campus located in Addison, Texas. Called ACU Dallas, the new campus began offering several new graduate programs, including an MBA and Ed.D. in organizational leadership.

=== Discrimination ===
The university was officially segregated, for white students only, until 1962, when Billy Curl became the first black student to enroll. The university currently bars employees, but not students, from dating people of the same sex. In 2016 the university recognized Voice, an LGBT student association.

=== Presidents ===
- Allen Booker Barret (1906–08)
- H. C. Darden (1908–1909)
- Robertson Lafayette Whiteside (1909–1911)
- James F. Cox (1911–1912)
- Jesse Parker Sewell (1912–1924)
- Batsell Baxter (1924–1932)
- James F. Cox (1932–1940)
- Don H. Morris (1940–1969)
- John C. Stevens (1969–1981)
- William J. Teague (1981–1991)
- Royce Money (1991 – May 31, 2010)
- Phil Schubert (June 1, 2010–present)

== Academics ==
=== Academic structure ===
In 2022, ACU announced major changes to the academic structure that resulted in the creation of three new colleges. While the total number of colleges went unchanged, the reorganization was implemented to assist the university in marketing itself as a national university.

College of Arts, Humanities and Social Sciences	Art and Design; Communication and Sociology; History and Global Studies; Journalism and Mass Communication; Language and Literature; Liberal Arts; Music; Political Science and Criminal Justice; School of Education; Theatre
College of Biblical Studies	Bible, Missions and Ministry; Marriage and Family Studies; Graduate School of Theology
College of Business Administration	Accounting; Dukes School of Finance; Management Sciences; School of Information Technology and Computing
College of Health and Behavioral Sciences	Communication Sciences and Disorders; Kinesiology and Nutrition; School of Nursing; Occupational Therapy; Psychology; School of Social Work
Onstead College of Science and Engineering	Agricultural and Environmental Sciences; Biology; Chemistry and Biochemistry; Engineering and Physics; Mathematics

=== Accreditation ===
Academic rankings

National
- U.S. News & World Report: 329 (tie)
- Washington Monthly: 435 of 442
- WSJ/College Pulse: 501 (tie) of 600

ACU is institutionally accredited by the Southern Association of Colleges and Schools. ACU's business programs are professionally accredited by the Association to Advance Collegiate Schools of Business (AACSB International), the Engineering program is accredited by the Engineering Accreditation Commission of ABET, the Social Work programs are accredited by the Council on Social Work Education, the Education programs are accredited by Teacher Education Accreditation Council and the Marriage and Family Therapy programs are accredited by Commission on the Accreditation for Marriage and Family Therapy Education. The Department of Journalism and Mass Communication is accredited by the Accrediting Council on Education in Journalism and Mass Communications. The ACU School of Nursing is accredited by the Commission on Collegiate Nursing Education (CCNE). ACU Graduate School of Theology is accredited by the Association of Theological Schools (ATS).

== Traditions ==
- The Prickly Pear. From 1916 to 2009, this was the yearbook. The name was taken from Opuntia, a species of cactus native to the Abilene and West Texas area, commonly referred to as "prickly pear".

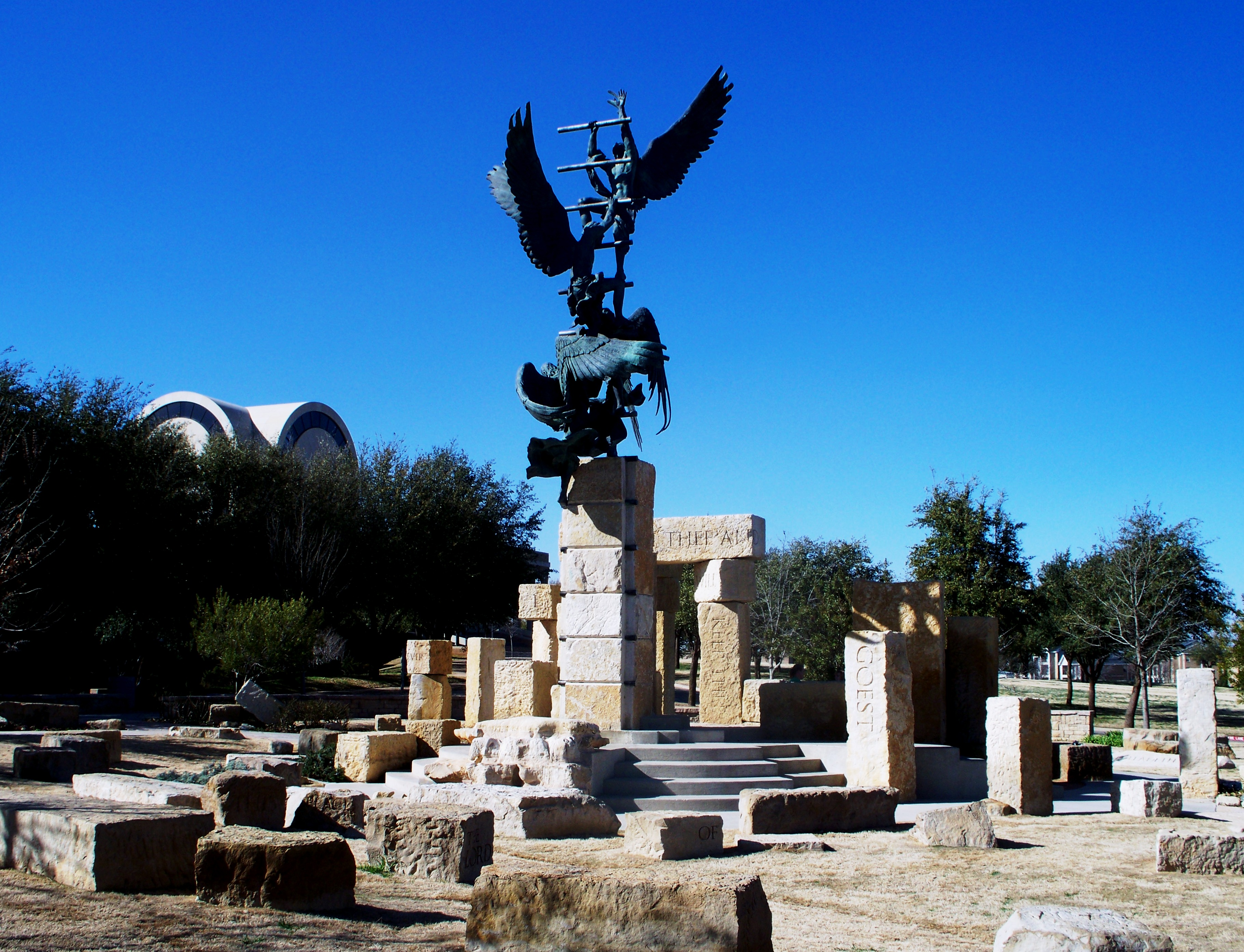
Jacob's Dream statue and display on the ACU campus

- Sing Song. Since 1956, this annual competition in mid-February has featured student groups of 30–100 people, singing themed a cappella medleys, usually satirical. Originating as a fundraiser for the school, the modern event has developed into a major show for which each group assembles costumes related to their act's theme, such as Peter Pan, the British Royal Guard, Coca-Cola, Adam and Eve, or forest fires. Often the costumes involve a mid-performance quick-change to a second costume—such as the 1987 acts in which grapes turned into raisins or bananas peeled to reveal Carmen Miranda—or elaborate choreography within the risers, as when the 1983 freshman class act recreated a Pac-Man screen and manipulated their costumes so that the character appeared to move around the screen. The men of Galaxy and the women of Sigma Theta Chi currently hold the records for most wins of a men's club and women's club, respectively.
- Summit. Referred to as Lectureship until the 2008 school year. Begun in 1918, this annual program gathers thousands of attendees for lectures and workshops on religious topics connected with a biblical theme that changes each year. After many years of following directly after Sing Song, the lectureship moved in 2006 to a September event, in part to spread out the events that bring the most visitors to campus and also to take advantage of the more stable autumn climate, as winter storms and rain had hindered attendance on multiple occasions.

== Abilene Christian University Press ==
ACU is one of only seven faith-based institutions with a press. ACU Press, founded in 1983 to print books about Churches of Christ theology, is now a member of the Association of American University Presses, printing books about Christian Higher Education, West Texas History and Christian Living as well as theology. Along with its trade imprint, Leafwood Publishers, the press publishes an average of 36 titles per year. Among its notable authors are Rubel Shelly, Rick Ostrander, Darryl Tippens, Edward Fudge, Larry M. James and Walt McDonald.

== Student media ==
The school established an NPR station, KACU, in 1986. Initially, the community was concerned that the school might use the station for proselytizing, and for the station's first ten years, an advisory board composed of community members served to monitor the station against this possibility.

The Optimist, a converged student media operation, produces student-led news media.

== Research ==
In August 2022 the ACU applied to the US Nuclear Regulatory Commission (NRC) for a construction licence for a molten salt research reactor for which it plans to achieve criticality by December 2025.

== Athletics ==
Abilene Christian Athletics wordmark

Formerly a charter member of the Division I Southland Conference, Abilene Christian joined the Lone Star Conference (LSC) of Division II of the NCAA in 1973.

In 2007, the LSC included 33 ACU current and former student athletes in its 75-member all-sports team commemorating the conference's 75th anniversary. Through 2009, ACU is fourth in NCAA history in team national championships won with 57, trailing Division I schools UCLA, Stanford, and USC, and tied with Division III school Kenyon College.

In 2012, Abilene Christian received NCAA permission to compete in Division I FCS football and was under consideration for reattachment to the Southland Conference. On August 25, 2012, Abilene Christian's board of trustees accepted Southland's invitation to rejoin the conference effective with the start of the 2013–14 academic year.

On Wednesday, August 23, 2017, the NCAA Board of Directors voted to pass ACU through to full Division I status, thus making them eligible for postseason play.

In 2021, ACU left the Southland for the Western Athletic Conference. After the 2022 football season, ACU football joined the newly formed United Athletic Conference, a merger of the football leagues of the WAC and the ASUN Conference. The two all-sports conferences had partnered in a football-only alliance in the 2021 and 2022 seasons.

=== Athletic achievements ===
- The men's track and field program has won 32 NCAA National Track and Field Championships: 19 NCAA outdoor and 13 indoor.
- The women's track and field program has won 22 national championships: 12 indoor and 10 outdoor.
- The Wildcats were NAIA national football champions in 1973 and 1977.
- Before the NCAA invalidated its 2007 season, nine ACU football players were included in the LSC's 75th-anniversary list of top players in conference history. The school's 2007 victories were vacated by the NCAA in 2009. The NCAA charged "two assistant football coaches helped a pair of players find an English correspondence class to take, enroll in the same course, allowed them to use the coaches' school computers for writing papers and paid to mail the assignments." The school had scored more than 40 points in 11 of its 13 games and more than 50 points in 7 games and 70 or more points in two games including a 73–76 three overtime loss to Chadron State in the second round of the NCAA playoffs.
- In 2008, the Wildcats "set a record for points in an NCAA (football) playoff game, beating West Texas A&M 93–68 in the second round of the Division II playoffs."
- Ove Johansson kicked the longest field goal in college football history (69 yards) in 1976, 1 yard longer than the current NFL record. As of 2024 it remains the longest field goal ever kicked in any level of football competition and is an unbroken world record.
- Olympic athletes from ACU include Bobby Morrow, three-time 1956 gold medal winner; Earl Young, 1960 Olympic gold medalist in the 4x400 relay; Billy Olson, who made the 1980 and 1988 U.S. teams but did not compete in 1980 due to President Carter's decision to boycott the Games; Yolande Straughn, who competed in 1988 for Barbados; and James Browne, 1988 competitor for Antigua.
- ESPN and NFL Network analyst and author Sean Adams is a former NCAA All-American athlete for ACU.

== Social clubs ==
The school has a number of student organizations called "social clubs" that are equivalent to a fraternity or sorority on other college campuses.

== Notable alumni ==
=== Academia and religion ===
- Kent Brantly, doctor and missionary
- Don Finto, pastor and author
- Edward Fudge, theologian
- Sally Gary, author
- V. E. Howard, minister
- Robert Kelley, president of the University of North Dakota
- H. Jeff Kimble, professor of physics at the California Institute of Technology
- David Leeson (1978), journalist
- Dale Martin, bible scholar
- Barry McCarty, national radio host and former president of Cincinnati Christian University
- John W. Pilley, behavioral psychologist
- James Tabor, scholar of early Christianity and Second-Temple Judaism
- Hugh M. Tiner, president of Pepperdine University
- R. Gerald Turner, president of Southern Methodist University
- Thomas B. Warren, minister
- M. Norvel Young, president of Pepperdine University

=== Business ===
- Gordon Bethune, former CEO of Continental Airlines
- David Sampson, President and CEO of the Property Casualty Insurers Association of America
- Monty Taylor, cloud computing executive, co-founder of OpenStack

=== Entertainment and media ===
- Nelson Coates, film production designer
- Chris Christian, record producer, recording artist, songwriter
- Bonnie Curtis, film producer
- Jody Dean, news anchor of KTVT-TV, Dallas, Texas
- Holly Dunn, musician and painter
- Ronnie Dunn, singer and songwriter
- Micah P. Hinson, singer and songwriter
- Billie Hughes, recording artist and songwriter
- Daniel Johnston, singer and songwriter – attended ACU in his first year of college
- Stephen Mansfield, author
- Max Lucado, author
- TJ McCloud, singer-songwriter
- Aaron Watson, musician
- Zane Williams, musician
- Big Pokey, musician
- Merritt Tierce, short-story author, story editor, essayist, pro-choice activist, novelist, and television writer.
- Jerry Haymes, recording artist, songwriter, producer
- Gary G. Hamilton, television journalist and producer

=== Politics and government ===
- Jeffrey S. Boyd, Justice of the Texas Supreme Court,
- Janice Hahn, member of the Los Angeles County Board of Supervisors; former member of the United States House of Representatives; former Los Angeles City Councilwoman
- Robert Dean Hunter, vice-president emeritus of ACU; member of the Texas House of Representatives, District 71 (1986–2007)
- Robert L. Pitman, lawyer, former United States Attorney; former United States Magistrate Judge; United States federal judge
- Ted Poe, former Harris County, Texas, judge; member of the United States House of Representatives
- Jack Pope, lawyer, judge, and Supreme Court of Texas Chief Justice, 1982–1985
- Jack Scott, California state senator; chancellor, California Community College System
- Joe Shirley (1978), President of Navajo Nation
- Lynn Coleman, former United States Deputy Secretary of Energy
- Louie Welch, former mayor of Houston, Texas
- Garrett Harencak, Commander of the U.S. Air Force Recruiting Service
- Paul J. Selva, former vice chairman of the Joint Chiefs of Staff representing the U.S. Air Force
- Matthew J. Kacsmaryk, United States district judge of the United States District Court for the Northern District of Texas
- Brantley Starr, United States district judge of the United States District Court for the Northern District of Texas

=== Sports ===
- Bill Blakeley, basketball coach
- James Browne, long jumper from Antigua
- Randall "Tex" Cobb, boxer, actor
- Charles Coody, golfer, winner of the 1971 Masters Tournament
- Grant Feasel, football player
- Greg Feasel, former offensive tackle in the NFL for the Green Bay Packers and San Diego Chargers; Executive Vice President/Chief Operating Officer for the Colorado Rockies; ACU Sports Hall of Fame (2004–05)
- Taylor Gabriel, football player for the Chicago Bears
- James Hill, football player for the Seattle Seahawks
- Ove Johansson, football player
- Johnny Knox, football player
- John Layfield, wrestler
- Clint Longley, football player
- Danieal Manning, football player
- Lindy McDaniel, baseball player
- Cleo Montgomery, football player
- Wilbert Montgomery, football player
- Bobby Morrow, sprinter
- Billy Olson, pole vaulter
- Billy Gene Pemelton, pole vaulter
- Johnny Perkins, football player
- Raymond Radway, football player
- Daryl Richardson, football player
- Bernard Scott, football player
- Jeev Milkha Singh (1996), golfer
- Gilbert Tuhabonye, runner and author
- Charcandrick West, football player
- Allen Wilson, football coach
- Earl Young, runner
- Art Briles, former head coach at Baylor University
- Rusty Whitt, coach
- Wes Kittley, coach of Texas Tech Red Raiders track and field

=== Faculty ===
- Everett Ferguson, patristics scholar
- Douglas A. Foster, professor of church history
- Michael A. O'Donnell, professor of family studies

== Notes ==
- When James Cox's wife became ill, his brother, Alonzo B. Cox, filled in for him to finish the term.

== Bibliography ==
- Stevens, Dr. John C., No Ordinary University: The History of a City Set on a Hill, Abilene, Texas: Abilene Christian University Press, 1998. ISBN 0-89112-031-9.
