= Edward Fudge =

American Christian theologian

Edward William Fudge
- Born: July 13, 1944; Lester, Alabama, United States
- Died: November 25, 2017 (aged 73)
- Education: Florida College; Abilene Christian University; University of Houston College of Law
- Employer(s): The Lanier Law Firm, LLP
- Known for: Annihilationism
- Website: www.edwardfudge.com

Edward William Fudge (July 13, 1944 – November 25, 2017) was an American Christian theologian and lawyer, best known for his book The Fire That Consumes in which he argues for an annihilationist Biblical interpretation of Hell. He has been called "one of the foremost scholars on hell" by The Christian Post. He is the subject of the 2012 independent film Hell and Mr. Fudge.

== Personal life ==
Fudge was raised by devout parents. His mother was the child of missionaries to southern Africa, and his father was a Christian publisher and a minister in Churches of Christ. He received bachelor's and master's degrees at Abilene Christian University and completed law school at the University of Houston College of Law. Fudge was raised in non-institutional Churches of Christ, attending Florida College before transferring to Abilene Christian. After completing his master's in Biblical languages from Abilene, Fudge ministered for non-institutional Churches of Christ in St. Louis and Athens, Alabama. Fudge then moved to Houston, Texas, where he lived until his death on November 25, 2017.

== The Fire That Consumes ==
Although Fudge published several books, only The Fire That Consumes has been published in multiple editions. The first printing of the first edition, subtitled A Biblical and Historical Study of Final Punishment, was published in early 1982 (ISBN 0-89890-018-2) by Verdict Publications (Australia), with a foreword by F. F. Bruce of Manchester, England.

The book examined the doctrine of the final punishment of the unredeemed from throughout the whole Bible, non-biblical literature of Second Temple Judaism (Apocrypha, Pseudepigrapha, Dead Sea Scrolls), as well as the historical development of the doctrine of final punishment through the Apostolic Fathers; Ante-Nicene, Nicene, and Post-Nicene Fathers; medieval and later theologians; and Reformers and later theologians. Special attention is given to Augustine ("City of God") and to John Calvin ("Psychopannychia"). Fudge argues that the doctrine of hell as eternal, conscious torment was not a necessary corollary of the doctrine of the immortality of the soul, brought into the Christian church by apologists such as Athenagoras and especially Tertullian.

When the first printing sold out in five months, Verdict gave all rights to the author, who for 29 years self-published the book through multiple printings under the name Providential Press. The only change in the second printing was enlarging the subtitle to say "A Biblical and Historical Study of the Doctrine of Final Punishment." The second printing was an Alternate Selection of the Evangelical Book Club.

Twelve years later in 1994, a condensed second edition (ISBN 0-85364-587-6), subtitled The Biblical Case for Conditional Immortality and including a new foreword by John W. Wenham of Oxford, was published by Paternoster Press in England. Paternoster was later bought by Authentic Media, which let the second edition go out of print.

Seventeen years later, Fudge revised and updated the first edition to produce a definitive third edition which was published by Cascade Books, the academic division of Wipf & Stock (ISBN 1-60899-930-0). This edition was again subtitled A Biblical and Historical Study of the Doctrine of Final Punishment, and included a new foreword by Richard Bauckham of Cambridge University. Throughout the third edition, Fudge interacts with seventeen authors of eleven traditionalist books, advancing the dialogue by three decades.

Christianity Today has called The Fire That Consumes "the standard reference on the subject." Since its first publication, The Fire That Consumes has been cited with increasing frequency by scholars and other serious authors writing on the topic. Among these are articles in Journal of the Evangelical Theological Society, Evangelical Quarterly, Christian Research Institute Journal, Reformation & Revival, and Themelios. Christianity Today picked it as one of four volumes representing the "annihilationist" viewpoint on Hell in a 2000 topical bibliography.

Fudge's other works on Hell include Two Views of Hell: A Biblical & Theological Dialogue, coauthored by traditionalist Robert A. Peterson, and Hell: A Final Word (The Surprising Truths I Found in the Bible) (ISBN 978-089112-149-7), a more accessible work for popular audiences.

== Hell and Mr. Fudge ==
Fudge is the subject of the biopic Hell and Mr. Fudge, produced by Pat Arrabito, directed by Jeff Wood, and starring Mackenzie Astin as Fudge. The film was released at the 2012 Worldfest-Houston International Film Festival. Fudge cooperated in the film's development.

== Education ==
- A.A. Florida College (1965)
- B.A. Abilene Christian University (1967)
- M.A. Abilene Christian University (1968)
- J.D. University of Houston College of Law (1988)

== Publications ==
- Resurrection!: Essays in Honor of Homer Hailey, Athens, Alabama: C.E.I. Publishing Company, 1973. ISBN 978-0-88407-003-0.
- Our Man in Heaven: An Exposition of the Epistle to the Hebrews, Grand Rapids, Michigan: Baker Book House, 1974.
- The Fire That Consumes: A Biblical and Historical Study of the Doctrine of Final Punishment, Providential Press, 1982. ISBN 978-0-89890-018-7.
- The Sound of His Voice: Discovering the Secrets of God's Guidance, Abilene, Texas: Leafwood Publishers, 2002. ISBN 978-0-97142-894-2.
- The Great Rescue: The Story of God's Amazing Grace, Abilene, Texas: Leafwood Publishers, 2002. ISBN 0-9714289-3-X.
- GracEmail: Daily Answers for Life's Big Questions, Abilene, Texas: Hillcrest Publishing, 2003. ISBN 978-0-89112-489-4.
- Hebrews: Ancient Encouragement for Believers Today, Abilene, Texas: Leafwood Publishers, 2009. ISBN 978-0-89112-625-6.
- Two Views of Hell: A Biblical & Theological Dialogue (Spectrum), with Peterson, Robert A., Downer's Grove, Illinois: IVP Academic, 2010. ISBN 0-83082-255-0.
- The Divine Rescue: The Gripping Drama of a Lost World and of the Creator Who Will Not Let It Go., Abilene, Texas: Leafwood Publishers, 2010. ISBN 978-0-89112-645-4.
- Hell: A Final Word, Abilene, Texas: Leafwood Publishers, 2012. ISBN 978-0-89112-149-7.
