= Matana (disambiguation) =

Matana is a town and seat of the Commune of Matana in Burundi. It can also refer to:

- Matana, Gir Somnath, a village in India
- Lake Matano, also known as Lake Matana, South Sulawesi province, Indonesia
- Matana Roberts (born 1975), American musician
- Jerry Matana (born 1998), Fijian rugby player
- Jakie Wellman (born 1988), nicknamed "Matana", Zambian swimmer

== See also ==
- Matanas
- Matanaq
- Matane (disambiguation)
