= Thomas B. Warren =

- Born: Thomas Bratton Warren; August 1, 1920; Carrizo Springs, Texas
- Died: August 8, 2000 (aged 80)
- Occupations: Philosopher and theologian
- Spouse: Faye C. Brauer
- Theological work
- Tradition or movement: Restoration Movement

Thomas Bratton Warren (August 1, 1920 – August 8, 2000) was an American professor of philosophy of religion and apologetics at the Harding School of Theology in Memphis, Tennessee, USA, and was an important philosopher and theologian in the Churches of Christ during the latter half of the twentieth century.

Warren had been in failing health for many years when he died at the age of 80.

== Early life ==
Warren was born in Carrizo Springs, Texas, USA. He was married to the former Faye C. Brauer (1921–2001) in 1941. They had three children. Warren served in the United States Air Force as an aerial navigator in World War II.

== Education ==
Warren received a B.S. in mathematics from Abilene Christian College, the M.A. in religion from the University of Houston, and the M.A. and Ph.D. in philosophy from Vanderbilt University. His dissertation topic foreshadowed his long-time interest in apologetics: God and Evil: Does Judeo-Christian Theism Involve a Logical Contradiction?

== Teaching career ==
Warren taught mathematics and Bible at Abilene Christian College, Abilene, Texas, USA during the 1946–47 academic year. From 1959 to 1961 he chaired the Department of Bible at Fort Worth Christian College where he also served as president. At Freed-Hardeman College in Henderson, Tennessee, USA, Warren chaired the Department of Bible from 1964 to 1971. His most fruitful academic appointment was as Professor of Philosophy of Religion and Apologetics at Harding Graduate School of Religion, where he served from 1971 to 1979. He was co-founder and Dean of the Graduate School and Professor of Philosophy and Christian Doctrine and Apologetics at Tennessee Bible College in Cookeville, Tennessee, USA. In addition, Warren served as minister of several Churches of Christ throughout his career.

== Philosophical research and debates ==
Warren's earliest published work in philosophy was modified from the final chapter of his Vanderbilt University dissertation and was published in 1972. In Have Atheists Proved There is No God?, Warren develops a version of a soul-making theodicy to answer J. L. Mackie's argument from evil against theism. Warren's chief claim to fame outside the Churches of Christ regards his debates with Antony Flew and Wallace Matson on the existence of God, and his debate with Joe E. Barnhart on the adequacy of utilitarian ethics. The debate with Flew, a major proponent of atheism famous for his argument that theism is not falsifiable, was held at North Texas State University (now the University of North Texas) in Denton, Texas, USA from September 20–23, 1976. This was an exceptionally well attended debate, and Flew describes it as the best attended of his many debates with theists on the existence of God, with audiences each night ranging from 5,000 to 7,000 people. The Warren-Matson Debate took place in Tampa, Florida, USA from September 11–14, 1978. Matson, a professor of philosophy at the University of California at Berkeley was, like Flew, a long-time proponent of atheism. The Warren-Barnhart Debate took place at North Texas State University on November 3–6, 1980. Barnhart has retired as Professor of Philosophy at the University of North Texas.

== Philosophical views ==
Warren was a strong evidentialist on the issue of God's existence. He believed that there is proof beyond a reasonable doubt for the existence of God. In his two debates on the existence of God, Warren prefers versions of the Teleological Argument for the existence of God, using (in his debate with Flew) the alveoli in the lungs and the process of oxygen/carbon dioxide exchange as proof for an intelligent designer; in his debate with Matson, he used the circulatory system. Warren was also known for his logical traps, for example, his challenge to Flew to answer the question, "Which came first, a human mother or a human baby?" Flew struggled to answer Warren's question; however, Matson replied with, "When did Latin become French," arguing that in biological evolution, as in language, there are times when it is difficult to assign a language (or a life form) into a specific category. In his theological writings, especially in his articles in the magazine he edited, The Spiritual Sword, Warren argued that specific Christian beliefs, such as the resurrection of Christ and the inspiration of the Bible, could be proved by natural reason.

== Involvement in theological controversy ==
In the context of the Churches of Christ and the Restoration Movement, Warren was a strict restorationist: he believed that the noninstrumental Churches of Christ followed the strict New Testament pattern of Christian doctrine, worship, and practice. He held that any deviation from that pattern by a church would exclude it from being part of the Christian community. Warren consistently argued that members of the noninstrumental Churches of Christ are "the only Christians." This put Warren at odds with more liberal leaders in the Churches of Christ such as Rubel Shelly, who argued that members of Christian bodies outside the Churches of Christ could also be Christians. Warren also staunchly defended the traditional hermeneutic of the Churches of Christ: that only direct commands from the Bible, apostolic examples, or necessary (deductive) inferences from direct commands and examples were authoritative for Christians. This hermeneutic was consistent with Warren's strong epistemological rationalism.

Another area of controversy in Churches of Christ in which Warren played a role was the issue of divorce and remarriage. Warren's position was that a divorced individual could only be remarried if (1) the divorce was due to sexual immorality (fornication) (Matthew 19:9 NKJV, and (2) the individual desiring a second marriage was the innocent partner in the first marriage. Unless these two conditions were fulfilled, the remarried individual was not truly remarried, but "living in adultery." The proper action, according to Warren, for that person is to return to his or her first spouse, or remain celibate IAW Matthew 19:12).

== Legacy ==
Warren was one of the first trained philosophers to teach at colleges associated with churches of Christ. His debate with Flew on the existence of God is still known in many Fundamentalist and Evangelical Christian circles. He was an influential figure in the Churches of Christ from the 1940s through the early 1980s. Many of his writings are still read among members of the churches of Christ. Warren's influence remains strong. After Warren's death, a number of his former students and others influenced by his thought worked to establish a center in Christian apologetics. To the credit of those former students, there is now the Warren Apologetics Center in Parkersburg, WV., which produces apologetics material and can be found and accessed online - Warren Christian Apologetics Center (warrenapologetics.org).

== Selected writings ==
Christians Only and the Only Christians'. Jonesboro: National Christian Press, 1986. ISBN 978-0-934916-10-3

Have Atheists Proved There is no God? Nashville: Gospel Advocate Company, 1972. ISBN 978-0-934916-33-2

Keeping the Lock in Wedlock: A Critical Analysis of the Doctrine of Dr. James D. Bales on Divorce and Remarriage. Jonesboro, AR: National Christian Press, 1980. ISBN 978-0-934916-26-4

Logic and the Bible. Jonesboro, AR: National Christian Press, 1982. ISBN 978-0-934916-01-1

Sin, Suffering, and God. Jonesboro, AR: National Christian Press, 1980. ISBN 978-0-934916-25-7.

(with Joe E. Barnhart). The Warren-Barnhart Debate on Christian Ethics versus Utilitarian (Psychological Hedonistic) Ethics. Jonesboro, AR: National Christian Press, 1981.

(with Antony Flew). The Warren-Flew Debate on the Existence of God. Jonesboro, AR: National Christian Press, 1977. ISBN 978-0-934916-40-0

(with Wallace Matson). The Warren-Matson Debate on the Existence of God. Jonesboro, AR: National Christian Press, 1978. ISBN 0-934916-39-X

When is an Example Binding? Jonesboro, AR: National Christian Press, 1975. ISBN 0-934916-43-8
