= John Wesley Shipp =

American actor (born 1955)

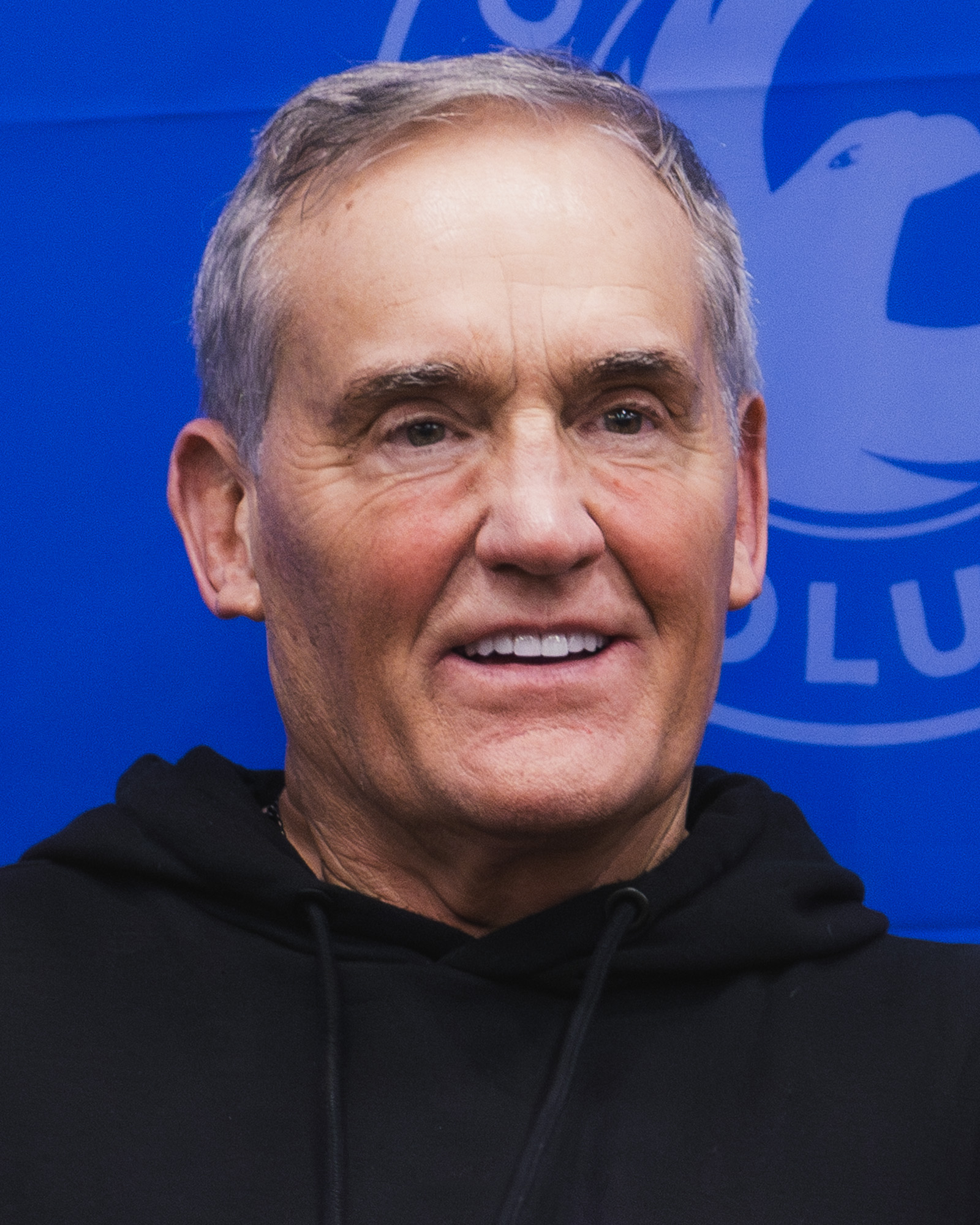
- Shipp in 2026
- Born: January 22, 1955 (age 71); Norfolk, Virginia, U.S.
- Occupation: Actor
- Years active: 1980–present

John Wesley Shipp (born January 22, 1955) is an American actor known for his various television roles. He played the lead Barry Allen on CBS's superhero series The Flash from 1990 to 1991, and Mitch Leery, the title character's father, on the drama series Dawson's Creek from 1998 to 2001. Shipp has also played several roles in daytime soap operas including Kelly Nelson on Guiding Light from 1980 to 1984, and Douglas Cummings on As the World Turns from 1985 to 1986 (which earned him his first Daytime Emmy Award). He portrayed Barry Allen's father Henry, Earth-3 Flash Jay Garrick, and Earth-90's Barry Allen (the Flash) on the CW's The Flash series.

== Early life ==
Shipp was born in Norfolk, Virginia. His father John Wesley Shipp Sr. was a farmer who returned to school when Shipp Jr. was young, and after attending the seminary in Wake Forest, North Carolina, he became the pastor of a small church outside Wake Forest. His father married Shirley Louise Bryant, who was a nurse. Shipp later gave a keynote speech to the graduating class of Wake Forest-Rolesville High School Class of 1999 to recount the tale of his father's attempts to integrate the community in the late 1960s. Shipp has one brother and one sister. Shipp attended Butler High School in Louisville, Kentucky, and later Indiana University.

== Career ==
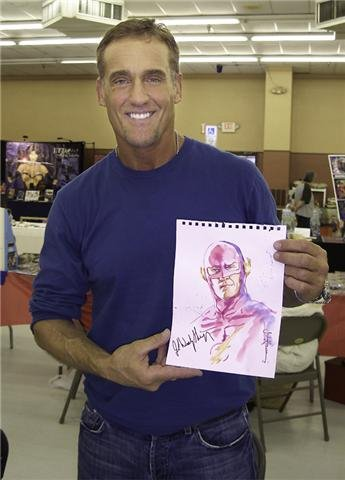
Shipp in 2010, at Florida Supercon

Shipp began his career with a regular role on the daytime soap opera Guiding Light, playing Dr. Kelly Nelson from 1980 to 1984. Shipp followed this with more roles in daytime, playing Douglas Cummings on As the World Turns from 1985 to 1986 (which earned him his first Daytime Emmy Award in 1986), and Martin Ellis on Santa Barbara in 1987 (for which he won his second Daytime Emmy Award), followed by Blanchard Lovelace on One Life to Live in 1989, and Carter Jones on All My Children in 1992. He also had guest appearances on primetime series, such as playing a peeper on an episode of Fantasy Island in 1983.

Shipp won the title role of Barry Allen (the Flash) on the CBS series The Flash, which aired in the 1990–91 season. He followed this with the recurring role of Lucky on the NBC series Sisters from 1994 to 1995. Shipp also appeared on stage in the 1990s, starring in Erik Jendresen's The Killing of Michael Malloy in 1993. In 1998, he was cast as Mitch Leery, the father of the lead character Dawson, on The WB drama series Dawson's Creek; Shipp remained part of the series' main cast through its first four seasons, exiting in 2001.

In November 2010, Shipp returned to daytime in the short-term role of villainous Eddie Ford on One Life to Live, who was killed off in a murder mystery in mid-December. In the summer of 2011, he guest-starred on the Lifetime series Drop Dead Diva, playing the ex-husband of the character played by comedian Kathy Griffin. Shipp filmed three episodes of the MTV series Teen Wolf as the abusive father of Daniel Sharman's character, which aired during the summer of 2012. Also in 2012, he starred in the independent film Hell and Mr. Fudge, with Mackenzie Astin and Eileen Davidson.

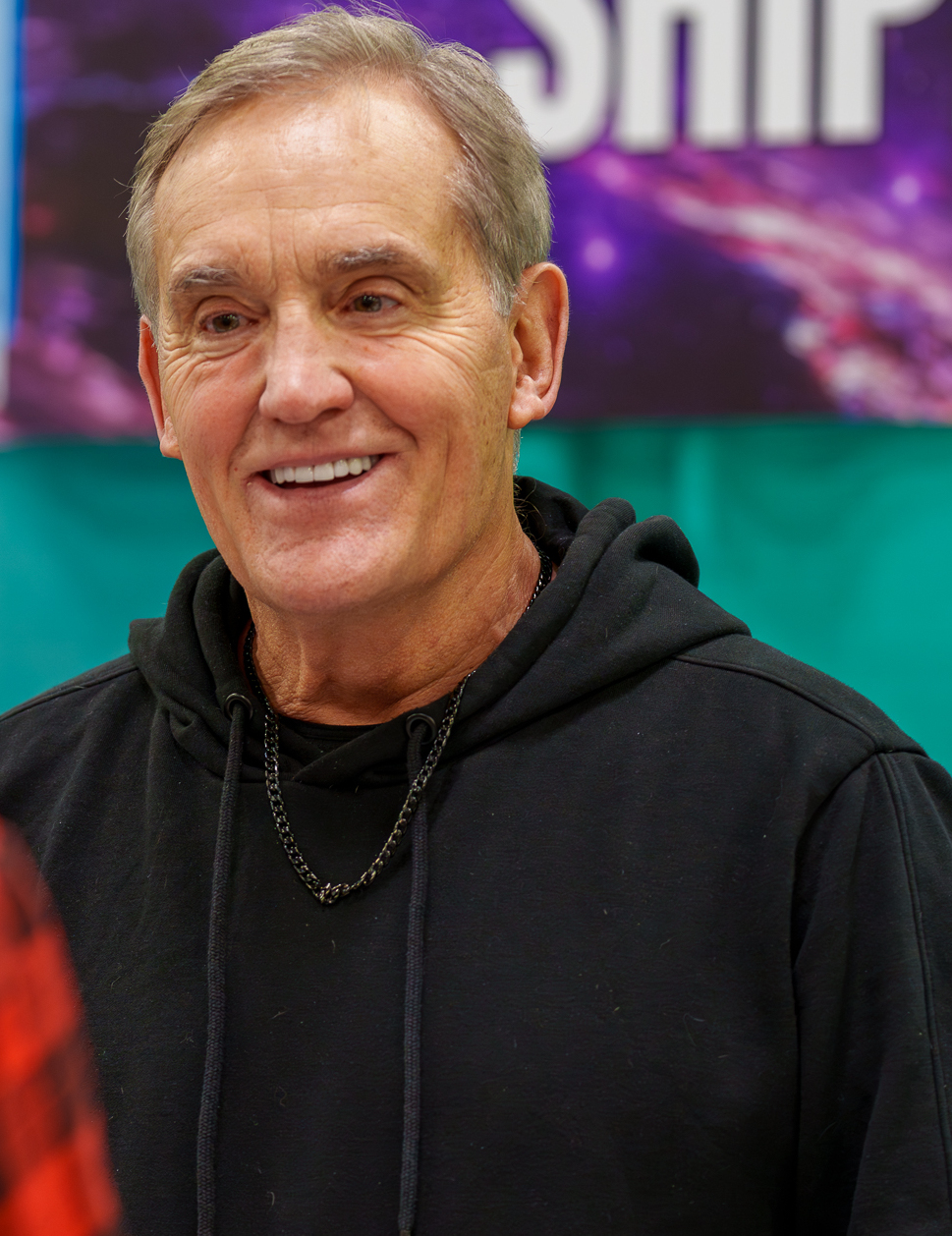
Shipp in 2025

Shipp returned to involvement with The Flash in the 2010s. He was cast in a "mysterious" role on The CW series The Flash in early 2014, which was later revealed to be the recurring role of Henry Allen, Barry's father. In the second-season finale of The Flash, Shipp played Jay Garrick, an alternate universe counterpart of The Flash, and, later, as his earlier incarnation of Barry Allen. He also guest starred as Eobard Thawne, Barry's archenemy, in the animated series Batman: The Brave and the Bold.

In 2015, Shipp also began lending his voice to the unique role of Sheriff Burns on the podcast drama "Powder Burns". It ran from 2015 to 2018, and was written and produced by David A. Gregory, and was recognized by the Voice Arts Awards and the Audio Verse Awards.

Shipp returned to the stage in 2016 as Juror #8 in Judson Theatre Company's production of Twelve Angry Men. He also performed the same role in a 2017 reading of the play at Brookfield Theatre for the Arts.

== Filmography ==
=== Film ===
Year	Title	Notes	
1990	The NeverEnding Story II: The Next Chapter	Barney Bux	
1994	Soft Deceit	John Hobart	
2002	Second to Die	Jim Bratchett	
2005	Starcrossed	Lane	Short film
2009	Port City	George	
2009	Grotesque	Father Fahey	Short film
2010	Separation Anxiety	Sr. Palmer	
2012	Hell and Mr. Fudge	Bennie Lee Fudge	
2014	Sensory Perception	Lt. Thawne	
2014	Golden Shoes	President of the United States	
2016	The Sector	Stillwell	
2019	Night Sweats	Nick Frankenthaler	

=== Television ===
Year	Title	Role	Notes
1980	The Dirtiest Show in Town	N/A	Television film
1980–1984	Guiding Light	Kelly Nelson	Regular role
1983	Fantasy Island	Todd Skylar	Episode: "The Songwriter" / "Queen of the Soaps"
1984	Summer Fantasy	Callahan	Television film
1985–1986	As the World Turns	Doug Cummings	Regular role
1986	Santa Barbara	Martin Ellis	Recurring role
1989	One Life to Live	Blanchard Lovelace	Recurring role
1990–1991	The Flash	Barry Allen / The Flash; Pollux	Lead role; Episode: "Twin Streaks"
1991	Baby of the Bride	Dennis	Television film
1991	Danger Team	Spec	Television film; voice role
1992	All My Children	Carter Jones	1 episode
1992	Human Target	Garner St. John	Episode: "Designated by Chance"
1994	NYPD Blue	Officer Roy Larson	2 episodes
1994	Golden Gate	Kenny Scanlon	Television film
1994	Green Dolphin Beat	Terry Lattner	Television film
1994–1995	Sisters	Lucky Williams	Recurring role, 10 episodes
1995	JAG	Gunnery Sergeant Granger	Episode: "War Cries"
1996	Deadly Web	Dr. Stanton	Television film
1996	Strangers	Jack	Episode: "Visit"
1997	Lost Treasure of Dos Santos	Jack	Television film
1997	Soldier of Fortune, Inc.	Griffin	Episode: "Alpha Dogs"
1998–2001	Dawson's Creek	Mitch Leery	Main role (seasons 1–4); recurring role (season 5)
1999	Road Rage	Jim Carson	Television film
2001	The Outer Limits	Coach Peter Shotwell	Episode: "Lion's Den"
2004	JAG	Colonel Marcus Sutter	Episode: "What If"
2005	Palmetto Pointe	Michael Jones	Recurring role, 5 episodes
2006	CSI: NY	Patrick Quinn	Episode: "Sweet 16"
2007	Christie's Revenge	Uncle Ray Colton	Television film
2007	The Closer	Chris Conroy	Episode: "Culture Shock"
2010	Batman: The Brave and the Bold	Professor Zoom	Voice role; episode: "Requiem for a Scarlet Speedster!"
2010	One Life to Live	Eddie Ford	18 episodes
2011	Drop Dead Diva	Doug Bailey	Episode: "He Said, She Said"
2012	One Life to Live	Eddie Ford	1 episode
2012–2013	Teen Wolf	Mr. Lahey	4 episodes
2014–2023	The Flash	Henry Allen, Jay Garrick / The Flash, Barry Allen (Earth-90)	Recurring role
2017	Blindspot	Dr. Katz	Episode: "Draw O Caesar, Erase a Coward"
2018	Supergirl	Barry Allen / The Flash	Episode: "Bunker Hill" (cameo)
2018	Arrow	Barry Allen of Earth-90 / The Flash	2 episodes
2019	Ruby Herring Mysteries: Her Last Breath	John Herring	Television film
2020	Ruby Herring Mysteries: Prediction Murder	John Herring	Television film
2021–2022	Stargirl	Jay Garrick / The Flash	2 episodes

== Awards and nominations ==
At the 14th Annual Daytime Emmy Awards in 1987, Shipp won the Outstanding Guest Performer Award (in a category that included Celeste Holm, Eileen Heckart, and Terrance Mann) becoming the only actor with consecutive wins from two different daytime dramas.

Year	Award	Category	Nominated work	Result	Refs
1986	Daytime Emmy Award	Outstanding Supporting Actor in a Drama Series	As the World Turns	Won	
1987	Daytime Emmy Award	Outstanding Guest Star in a Drama Series	Santa Barbara	Won	
