= Larry M. James =

American social worker and minister

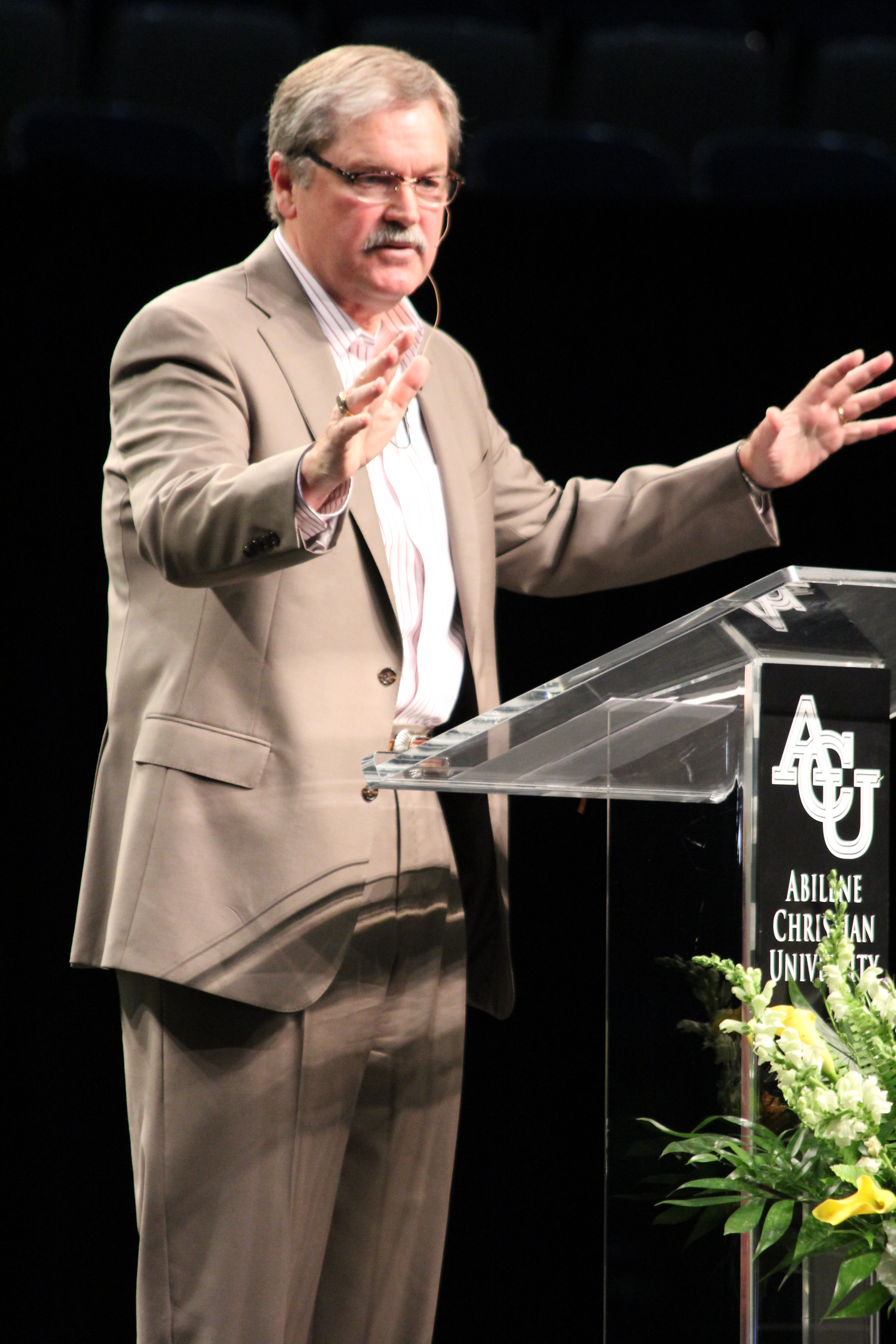
- Larry James speaking at Abilene Christian University's Summit conference in 2013.
- Born: 1950 (age 75–76)
- Education: Harding University, Harding School of Theology, New Orleans Baptist Theological Seminary, Tulane University
- Employer: CitySquare
- Title: CEO Emeritus

Larry M. James (born 1950) is an American social worker and the former president and CEO of CitySquare located in Dallas, Texas.

== Life ==
James was born in Spokane, Washington and grew up in Richardson, Texas, where his father served as the city secretary. He served in a New Orleans Church of Christ ministry while attending New Orleans Baptist Theological Seminary before returning to the Dallas area. He served as the senior minister for the Richardson East Church of Christ in Richardson, Texas for 14 years. James took leadership of CitySquare in 1994, while it was still known as Central Dallas Ministries.

== Education ==
B.A. Harding University (1972)
M.A. Harding School of Theology (1973)
M.Div. New Orleans Baptist Theological Seminary (1977)
M.A. Tulane University (1986)

== Publications ==
- The Wealth of the Poor, Abilene, Texas: Abilene Christian University Press, 2013. ISBN 978-0-89112-380-4.

== Personal life ==
Larry is married to Brenda. They have lived in inner city Dallas, Texas since 1999.
