= Don Finto =

Figure in the movement among evangelicals to support the evangelism of the Jewish people

Don Finto (born April 18, 1930) is a figure in the movement among evangelicals to support the evangelism of the Jewish people.

== Life ==
Don Finto started his ministry as a missionary in Germany. Upon return to the United States, he began teaching German at Lipscomb University in Nashville, Tennessee and preaching at the Una Church of Christ while earning his Ph.D. from Vanderbilt. Finto then moved to preach at the declining Belmont Church of Christ in the 1970s during The Jesus Movement. Under his leadership, the church grew and left the Churches of Christ background. The church saw attendance from many among the music industry in Nashville, Tennessee, including Amy Grant and Michael W. Smith. Finto retired from the pulpit in 1996 to found Caleb Company, an organization focused on the empowerment of youth. Finto's ministry focus on the Jewish people became clearer in his two books, Your People Shall Be My People, and God's Promise and the Future of Israel.

== Personal life ==
Don was married to Martha Ann, until her death in 2016. They have three children and seven grandchildren and live in Tennessee.

== Education ==
- B.A. Abilene Christian University (1950)
- M.A. Harding School of Theology
- Ph.D. Vanderbilt University

== Publications ==
- Your People Shall Be My People: How Israel, the Jews and the Christian Church Will Come together in the Last Days, Ventura, California: Regal Books. 2001. ISBN 0-8307-2653-5.
- God's Promise and the Future of Israel: Compelling Questions People Ask About Israel and the Middle East, Ventura, California: Regal Books. 2006. ISBN 978-0-83073-811-3.
