= C. Leonard Allen =

American writer

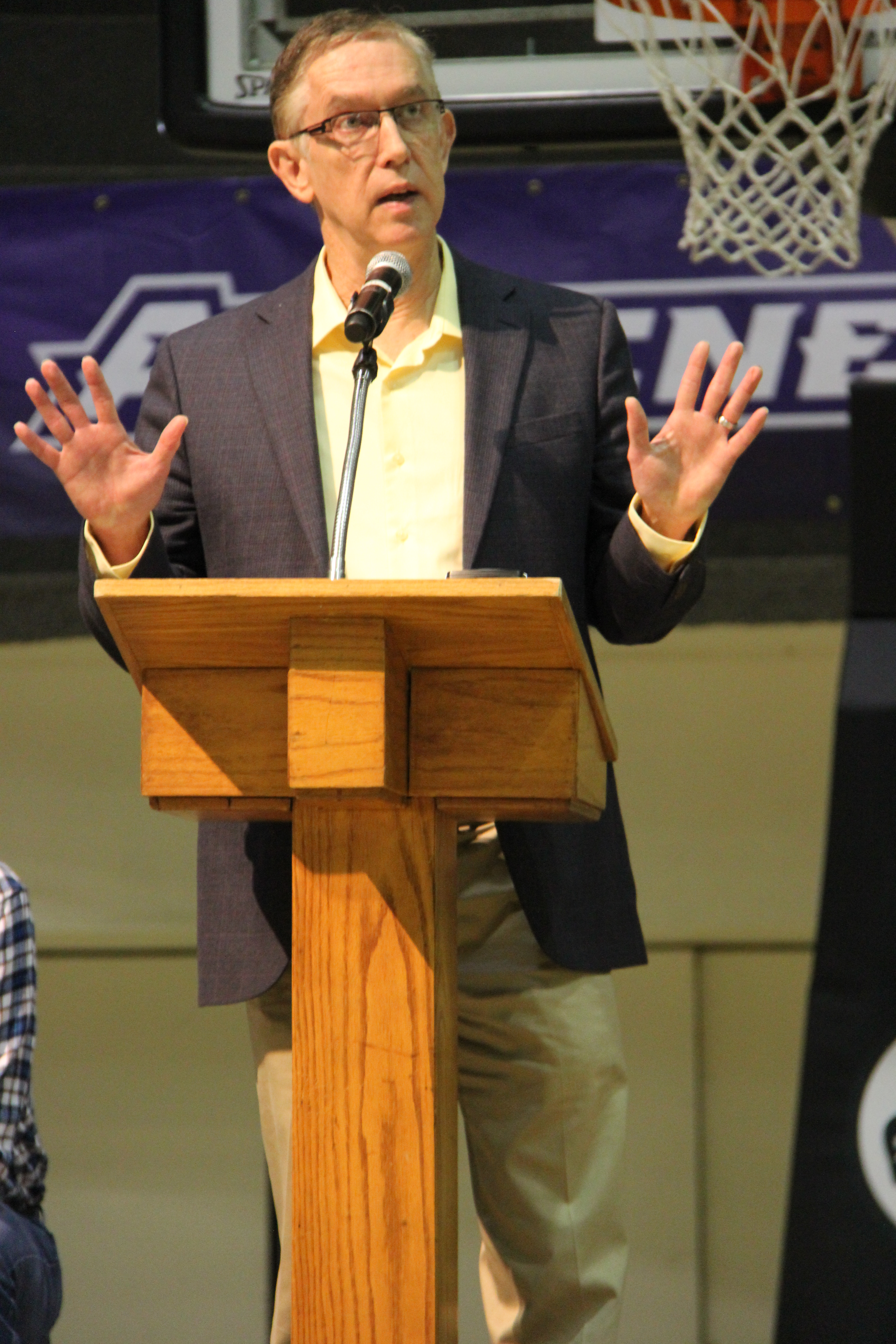
- Leonard Allen at ACU in 2014
- Education: University of Iowa; Harding University; Harding School of Theology
- Occupation: Dean of the Bible Department at Lipscomb University
- Spouse: Holly Catterton Allen
- Writing career
- Notable work: The Cruciform Church
- Literary movement: Restoration Movement

C. Leonard Allen is the Dean of Bible at Lipscomb University.

== Professor ==
Leonard Allen has taught at several schools, including Fuller Theological Seminary, Biola University, and John Brown University. He was a professor of Christian Studies at Abilene Christian University for 15 years.

== Publisher ==
He has authored and co-authored several books that deal primarily with the history and cultural impact of the Restoration Movement. In February 2000, Leonard Allen founded Leafwood Publishers, a publisher of Christian books on a variety of topics, including theology, culture and dealing with the study of the Bible in Orange, California. In 2005, Abilene Christian University Press purchased Leafwood Publishers and hired Leonard Allen as its director. Leonard directed Abilene Christian University Press and Leafwood Publishers until 2014 when he accepted an offer to be the dean of the Bible Department at Lipscomb University.

== Dean of Bible ==
In April 2014, Lipscomb University announced their decision to bring Leonard in as their new Dean of Bible.

== Education ==
B.A. Harding University (1973)
M.A. Harding School of Theology (1975)
Ph.D. University of Iowa (1984)

== Publications ==
- Illusions of Innocence: Protestant Primitivism in America, 1630-1875, with Richard T. Hughes, Abilene, Texas: Abilene Christian University Press, 1988. ISBN 978-0-89112-524-2.
- Discovering Our Roots: The Ancestry of Churches of Christ, with Richard T. Hughes, Abilene, Texas: Abilene Christian University Press, 1988. ISBN 0-89112-006-8.
- The Cruciform Church: Becoming a Cross-Shaped People in a Secular World, Abilene, Texas: Abilene Christian University Press, 1990, anniversary edition, 2016. ISBN 0-89112-510-8.
- The Worldly Church: A Call for Biblical Renewal, with Richard T. Hughes and Michael R. Weed, Abilene, Texas: Abilene Christian University Press, 1991. ISBN 0-89112-150-1.
- Distant Voices: Discovering a Forgotten Past for a Changing Church, Abilene, Texas: Abilene Christian University Press, 1999. ISBN 0-89112-154-4.
- Participating in God's Life: Two Crossroads for Churches of Christ, with Danny Gray Swick, Orange, California: New Leaf Books, 2001. ISBN 0-9700836-4-5.
- Things Unseen: Churches of Christ in (and After) the Modern Age, Siloam Springs, Arkansas: Leafwood Publishers, 2004. ISBN 0-9748441-5-2.
- Contemporaries Meet the Classics on Prayer, West Monroe, Louisiana:Howard Books, 2003. ISBN 978-1-58229-287-8.
- In the Great Stream: Imagining Churches of Christ in the Christian Tradition (Abilene, Texas: ACU Press, 2021). ISBN 978-1-68426-502-2.
- Answered by Fire: The Cane Ridge Revival Reconsidered, editor with Carisse Berryhill (Abilene, TX: ACU Press, 2020).
- The Bookroom: Remembrance and Forgiveness--A Memoir (Abilene, TX: ACU Press, 2024)

== Personal life ==
Leonard is married to Holly Allen. They live together in Nashville, Tennessee. They have three children and five grandchildren.
