= Leonard Allen =

Leonard Allen may refer to:

- C. Leonard Allen, dean of Bible at Lipscomb University.
- A. Leonard Allen (1891–1969), member of the U.S. House of Representatives
- Len Allen (Leonard John Allen, 1931–2022), British Olympic wrestler
