= Nibizi =

Nibizi is a surname of Burundian origin.

== People with the surname ==
- Eulalie Nibizi (born 1960), Burundian trade unionist and human rights activist
- Jeanine Nibizi, Burundian politician
- Isidore Nibizi, Burundian diplomat

== See also ==
- Nicizina
