= Darryl Tippens =

American academic administrator (born 1947)

- Born: 1947 (age 78–79)
- Education: Oklahoma Christian College (B.A.); Louisiana State University
- Occupations: Scholar and University Administrator (Provost)
- Spouse: Anne (Bentley) Tippens

Darryl Tippens is an American academic administrator and University Distinguished Scholar of Faith, Learning, and Literature (retired) at Abilene Christian University (ACU). He was provost of Pepperdine University from January 2001 until July 2014, and before that had served at ACU.

== Life ==
Darryl Tippens began teaching English in 1973 at Oklahoma Christian University where he served as the Chair of Language and Literature until 1987. He was named the James. W. Culp Distinguished Professor of English at Abilene Christian University from 1996 until 2000. In 2001, he became the Provost at Pepperdine University, where he also served as professor of Early Modern literature. He is co-editor of several books including Shadow & Light: Literature and the Life of Faith, 3rd Edition and author of several essays on literature, film, Christianity, and contemporary culture. He served on the board of the City of Lights, City of Angels film festival. He has long been a leader in the Conference on Christianity and Literature, serving as the president of the learned society since 2016.

== Education ==
B.A. Oklahoma Christian College (1968)
M.A. Louisiana State University (1971)
Ph.D Louisiana State University (1973)

== Publications ==
Author

- The Gospel According to Generation X. Abilene, TX: Abilene Christian University Press, 1995. ISBN 978-0-89112-015-5.
- Pilgrim Heart. Abilene, TX: Leafwood Publishers, 2006. ISBN 0-9767790-7-2.
- That's Why We Sing: Reclaiming the Wonder of Congregational Singing. Abilene, TX: Leafwood Publishers, 2006. ISBN 978-0-89112-507-5.

Editor

- Shadow & Light: Literature and the Life of Faith, Ed. Darryl Tippens, Stephen Weathers, Jack Welch, Abilene, TX: Abilene Christian University Press, 1997. ISBN 0-89112-068-8.
- Shadow & Light: Literature and the Life of Faith, 2nd Edition], Ed. Darryl Tippens, Stephen Weathers, and Jeanne Murray Walker, Abilene, TX: Abilene Christian University Press, 2005 ISBN 978-0-89112-069-8.
- Shadow & Light: Literature and the Life of Faith, 3rd Edition], Ed. Darryl Tippens, Stephen Weathers, and Jeanne Murray Walker, Abilene, TX: Abilene Christian University Press, 2013 ISBN 978-0-89112-070-4.
- New Wineskins Magazine, Brentwood, Tennessee: Zoe Group.
- Explorations in Renaissance Culture Journal, South-Central Renaissance Conference.

Contributor

- The Waltz He Was Born For: An Introduction to the Writing of Walt McDonald] Ed. Janice Whittington and Andrew Hudgins, Lubbock, Texas: Texas Tech University Press, 2002. ISBN 978-0-89672-487-7.
- The Soul of a Christian University: A Field Guide for Educators]. Abilene, TX: Abilene Christian University Press, 2008 ISBN 978-0-89112-520-4.

== Personal life ==
Tippens is married to Anne Tippens.
