= Gary Holloway =

American executive director

Gary Nelson Holloway
- Education: Harding School of Theology, University of Texas, Emory University
- Occupation: Executive Director
- Employer: World Convention of Churches of Christ
- Predecessor: Jeff Weston

Gary Holloway is the executive director of the World Convention of Churches of Christ.

== Life ==
Gary Holloway ministered with Holland Street Church of Christ in San Marcos, Texas. He then taught at Austin Graduate School of Theology in Austin, Texas, followed by Lipscomb University in Nashville, Tennessee, where he served as an Ijams Professor of Spirituality and their Director of Graduate Bible Studies. Holloway became the executive director of the World Convention of Churches of Christ in August 2010. He serves at Natchez Trace Church of Christ in Nashville, Tennessee. He is a senior fellow with Institute for Christian Spirituality, Lipscomb University. Holloway has authored numerous books, including several books on prayer and several books for the Meditative Commentary series. He is a lifetime member of the Disciples of Christ Historical Society.

== Education ==
- B.A. Freed–Hardeman College
- M.A.R. Harding School of Theology
- M.L.I.S. University of Texas
- Ph.D. Emory University

== Publications ==
- Saint, Demons and Asses: Southern Preacher Anecdotes, Bloomington, Illinois: Indiana University Press, 1989. ISBN 978-0-25332-841-0.
- O.B. Perkins and the Southern Oratorical Preaching Tradition (Studies in American Religion), Lewiston, New York: Edwin Mellen Press, 1992. ISBN 978-0-77349-173-1.
- In the Name of Jesus: Receiving Power from the Prayers of the New Testament, Hurst, Texas: Sweet Publishing, 1994. ISBN 978-0-83440-235-5.
- The College Press NIV Commentary: James & Jude, Joplin, Missouri: College Press Publishing, 1996. ISBN 978-0-89900-638-3.
- A Miracle Named Jesus, Joplin, Missouri: College Press Publishing, 1997. ISBN 978-0-89900-780-9.
- Main Thing: A New Look at Ecclesiastes, Abilene, Texas: Abilene Christian University Press, 1997. ISBN 978-0-89112-023-0.
- The Unexpected Jesus: A Surprising Look at the Savior, Joplin, Missouri: College Press Publishing, 1998. ISBN 978-0-89900-817-2.
- Theology Matters: In Honor of Harold Hazelip: Answers for the Church Today, with Mark C. Black, Harold Hazelip, Joplin, Missouri: College Press Publishing, 1998. ISBN 978-0-89900-813-4.
- Certain Hope: An Encouraging Word from Hebrews, Abilene, Texas: Abilene Christian University Press, 1999. ISBN 978-0-89112-024-7.
- Praying Like Jesus: What the New Testament Teaches about Prayer, Covenant Publishing. 2000. ISBN 978-1-89243-508-8.
- Radical Answers from the Minor Prophets, Abilene, Texas: Hillcrest Press, 2001. ISBN 978-0-89112-449-8.
- Renewing God's People: A Concise History of Churches of Christ, with Douglas A. Foster, Abilene, Texas: Abilene Christian University Press, 2001. ISBN 978-0-89112-010-0.
- Streams of Mercy: Acts, Abilene, Texas: Hillcrest Press, 2002. ISBN 978-0-89112-239-5.
- Unfinished Reconciliation: Justice, Racism and Churches of Christ, Abilene, Texas: Abilene Christian University Press, 2003. ISBN 978-0-89112-073-5.
- Alone with God, with James H. Garrison, Orange, California: Leafwood Publishers, 2003. ISBN 978-0-97284-256-3.
- Home Among Strangers: In the World with Christ, Covenant Publishing, 2003. ISBN 978-1-89243-541-5.
- Living God's Love: An Invitation to Christian Spirituality, with Earl Lavender, Abilene, Texas: Leafwood Publishers, 2004. ISBN 978-0-97484-412-1.
- Meditative Commentary: Matthew: Jesus is King, Abilene, Texas: Leafwood Publishers, 2005. ISBN 978-0976779018.
- Renewing God's People: A Concise History of Churches of Christ, 2nd. Edition, with Douglas A. Foster, Abilene, Texas: Abilene Christian University Press, 2006. ISBN 0-89112-010-6.
- Meditative Commentary: 1 & 2 Thessalonians, 1 & 2 Timothy and Titus: Jesus Grows His Church, Abilene, Texas: Leafwood Publishers, 2006. ISBN 978-0-89112-503-7.
- Meditative Commentary: Romans and Galatians: The Spirit of Jesus, Abilene, Texas: Leafwood Publishers, 2006. ISBN 978-0-89112-502-0.
- Meditative Commentary: John: Believing in Jesus, Abilene, Texas: Leafwood Publishers, 2007. ISBN 978-0-89112-504-4.
- Meditative Commentary: Hebrews and James: Brother Jesus, Abilene, Texas: Leafwood Publishers, 2007. ISBN 978-0-89112-505-1.
- Daily Disciple: A One-Year Devotional Guide, Abilene, Texas: Leafwood Publishers, 2008. ISBN 978-0-89112-556-3.
- Meditative Commentary: The Letters of Peter, John, and Jude: Living in Jesus, Abilene, Texas: Leafwood Publishers, 2008. ISBN 978-0-89112-557-0.
- You Might Be Too Busy If..., Spiritual Practices for People in a Hurry, Abilene, Texas: Leafwood Publishers, 2009. ISBN 978-0-89112-626-3.
- Renewal for Mission: A Concise History of Christian Churches and Churches of Christ, with Dennis Helsabeck and Douglas A. Foster, Abilene, Texas: Abilene Christian University Press, 2009. ISBN 978-0-89112-534-1.
- Praying Dangerously: Daring Prayers for Meaningful Faith, Abilene, Texas: Leafwood Publishers, 2010. ISBN 978-0-89112-675-1.
- Renewing Christian Unity: A Concise History of the Christian Church (Disciples of Christ), with Mark Toulouse and Douglas A. Foster, Abilene, Texas: Abilene Christian University Press, 2010. ISBN 978-0-89112-543-3.
- A Month With Jesus: 31 Days with a Surprising Savior, Abilene, Texas: Leafwood Publishers, 2012. ISBN 978-0-89112-361-3.
- Unfinished Reconciliation: Justice, Racism and Churches of Christ, 2nd enlarged Edition, Abilene, Texas: Abilene Christian University Press, 2013. ISBN 978-0-89112-395-8.
