= Eulalie Nibizi =

Burundian trade unionist and activist

- Born: 1960 (age 65–66); Kiryama, Commune of Songa, Burundi
- Occupations: Trade unionist, human rights activist

Eulalie Nibizi (born 1960) is a Burundian trade unionist and human rights activist. In 1991, she contributed to the establishment of Burundi's first trade union, Union des travailleurs du Burundi, and went on to found the teachers' union Syndicat des Travailleurs de l’Enseignement du Burundi. In 2015, while in Denmark, she learnt the Burundian authorities were treating her as an insurgent. Deciding it was better not to return to her home country, she has lived in exile ever since. Nibizi has since reported to the United Nations on human rights violations in Burundi. As coordinator of the human rights organization Coalition Burundaise des Défenseurs des Droits de l’Homme, she continues to fight for progress on human rights for all Burundians.

== Biography ==
Born in 1960 in Kiryama in the Burundian Commune of Songa, Eulalie Nibizi graduated in French language and literature. She contributed to the establishment of Burdundi's first trade union, Union des travailleurs du Burundi, in 1991, hoping to protect the interests of the teachers in the school where she worked. But at the government required all officials to become members, she soon distanced herself from the organization as she no longer believed it could act as a trade union. Instead she concentrated her efforts on the Syndicat des Travailleurs de l’Enseignement du Burundi (STEB) in her role as president. She played a particularly militant role which led to periods of imprisonment in 1997 and 2004.

She was particularly successful in 2002 when the general strike provided a special agreement and financial compensation for teachers as a result of concerted pressure from the union. Re-elected as president of STEB, in June 2015 she was invited to a meeting in Denmark. After she had criticized Burundi's president Pierre Nkurunziza, she was placed on a black list of enemies of the state. She explained that she was unable to return to Burundi as she was fighting for the union's right to demonstrate. She has not returned since, spending most of her time in Rwanda and Uganda.

In September 2018, at a side event in connection with a meeting of the United Nations Human Rights Council in Geneva, she reported on conditions in Burundi. The Burundi mission had formally requested that the UN should withdraw her ECOSOC badge.

Nibizi recently called on exiled Burundian defenders of human rights to ensure fruitful collaboration for the future: "The members of our coalition are scattered all over the world. It is crucial to support and connect them, so that, together, we can build a better future for our country, based on foundations of peace and human rights."
