= Matane (disambiguation) =

Matane is a city in Quebec, Canada.

Matane may also refer to:

- Matane (federal electoral district), Quebec, a federal district
- Matane (provincial electoral district), Quebec
- Matane was the former name of La Matanie Regional County Municipality, Quebec
- Matane River, Quebec
- Paulias Matane (1931–2021), Governor-General of Papua New Guinea
- "Mata ne", a 2008 song by Dreams Come True
- Compagnie de gestion de Matane (COGEMA), a subsidiary of Canadian National Railway
- HMCS Matane, a river-class frigate of the Royal Canadian Navy

== See also ==
- Matana (disambiguation)
