= Gilbert Tuhabonye =

Burundian long-distance runner

- Born: November 22, 1974 (age 51); Songa, Burundi
- Education: Abilene Christian University
- Occupations: Athlete, motivational speaker

Gilbert Tuhabonye (born November 22, 1974) is a Burundian long-distance runner, author, and motivational speaker. He was born in Songa, a town in the Commune of Songa, Burundi, where he survived a massacre during the Burundian Civil War. He moved to the United States and wrote a book about his survival. He is also married to Triphine and has two daughters named Emma and Grace.

== Biography ==
Tuhabonye is a survivor of the massacres during the Burundian Civil War of the early 1990s. In October 1993, members of the Hutu tribe invaded Tuhabonye's high school and captured more than 100 Tutsi children and teachers. Most of the captives were killed with machetes; the rest were burned alive. After spending nearly nine to 10 hours hidden beneath the burning corpses of his classmates and suffering burns over much of his body, Tuhabonye managed to escape and seek medical attention. He published his account in This Voice in My Heart: A Genocide Survivor's Story of Escape, Faith, and Forgiveness (HarperCollins Publishing, 2006).

By 1996, his running skills took him to the United States as part of an Olympic training program. He obtained a track scholarship at Abilene Christian University and was a national champion runner. Tuhabonye is the award-winning coach of Gilbert's Gazelles Training Group in Texas. In 2006, he co-founded the Gazelle Foundation, a non-profit organization whose mission is to improve life for people in Burundi without regard to tribal affiliations. Today Gilbert is a US citizen and lives in Austin, Texas, with his wife and children.

'This Voice in My Heart' has been featured on National Public Radio and the BBC.

== Competition ==
=== Overview ===
Tuhabonye was the 1999 Lonestar Conference Champion in the 1500 meters and the 8k Cross Country Meet. Tuhabonye competed internationally in Europe and represented Burundi at the 1999 Chiba Ekiden Relay in Chiba, Japan.

Post-college, Tuhabonye recorded a personal best of 2:23 in the marathon and 1:06 in the half marathon.

=== Athletic career ===
Burundi

- 1992:
  - Burundi National Champion, 400 meters
  - Burundi National Champion, 800 meters
- 1996: One of eight Burundian students chosen to travel to the US to train, and possibly qualify for participation in, the 1996 Olympic Games in Atlanta

United States - College

- 1999:
  - Division II Indoor National Champion in the 800 meters (1:52.20)
  - Lone Star Conference Champion in the 1500 meters (3:51.94)
- 2000:
  - 2nd place Lone Star Conference Championships (NCAA Division II) in the 800 meters (1:53.01)
  - 3rd place Indoor National Championships (NCAA Division II) in the 800 meters (1:50.96)
  - 3rd place Lone Star Conference Championships (NCAA Division II) in the 1500 meters (3:53.43)
  - 5th place Indoor National Championships (NCAA Division II) in the mile (4:06.91)
  - Four-time member of Lone Star Conference Title (NCAA Division II) teams
  - Five-time member of NCAA Division II National Championship teams

United States - Professional

- 2005: Oklahoma City Memorial Marathon; 1:09:45, 1st place
- 2006: Oklahoma City Memorial Marathon; 1:11:19, 1st place
- 2007:
  - Chicago Marathon; 2:33:03, 25th place overall/8th place division
  - Decker Challenge 20K, Austin, Texas; 1:09:17, 6th place overall/1st place division
  - ARA 20 Miler, Austin, Texas; 1:54:12, 1st place
- 2008:
  - Moe's Better Half Marathon, San Marcos, Texas; 1:14:59, 1st place
  - AT&T Half Marathon, Austin, Texas; 1:12:20, 10th place overall/2nd place division

=== Personal records ===
- 400 meters: 48.16 Kenya
- 800 meters: 1:47.2 Kenya
- Mile run: 3:57 Georgia
- 5K run: 13:40 Chiba Ekiden
- 10K run: 29:24
- Half marathon: 1:04:00 Bujumbura, Burundi
- 20k: 1:03:00 Decker Challenge (Austin, Texas)
- 25k: 1:22:00 Austin TX
- 30k: 1:39:00 Austin TX
- Marathon: 2:22:07 Grandma's Marathon (Duluth, Minnesota)

== Special awards ==
- 1996: Selected to carry the Olympic torch in Birmingham, Alabama, for 1996 Summer Olympics
- 1999: National Student-Athlete Day Giant Steps Award in the Courageous Student Athlete category, as selected by the National Consortium for Academics and Sports; Presented by President Bill Clinton at the White House
- 2004: Austin Marathon "Columbia Award"
- 2005: Voted 3rd Place Winner in Competitor Texas Magazine Best of Texas Running Coach Category
- 2009: Honored as a "Shining Star of Perseverance" by the Will Return Council of Assurant Employee Benefits, Kansas City, Kansas
