= Hell and Mr. Fudge =

- Directed by: Jeff Wood
- Written by: Donald Davenport
- Produced by: Jeff Wood
- Starring: Mackenzie Astin
- Cinematography: David Brillhart
- Music by: Lee Holdridge
- Production company: D'Artagnan Entertainment
- Distributed by: Flame Out Production
- Release date: July 7, 2012
- Country: United States
- Language: English
- Budget: $800,000

Hell and Mr. Fudge is a 2012 American drama film directed by Jeff Wood and written by Donald Davenport. Based on a true story, the film stars Mackenzie Astin as Edward Fudge, a real life Alabama preacher who has been hired to determine the nature of hell. The real life Fudge is best known for his book The Fire That Consumes, in which he argues against the immortal soul and eternal torment in hell.

== Cast ==
- Mackenzie Astin as Edward Fudge
  - Cody Sullivan as young Edward
- Keri Lynn Pratt as Sara Fudge
- John Wesley Shipp as Bennie Lee Fudge
- Eileen Davidson as Sibyl Fudge
- Wes Robertson as Joe Mark
  - Trevor Allen Martin as young Joe
- Helen Ingebritsen as Mrs. Herne
- Christian Fortune as Davy Hollis
- Sean McGowan as Don Haloway
- Tom Hillmann as Simon Clarage

== Production ==
Filming took place in Athens, Alabama in June and July 2011. The film had a scheduled release date of "first quarter 2012". Fudge cooperated in the film's development.

== Reception ==
In April 2012, the film received a Platinum award in the "Christian theatrical feature film" category at the Worldfest-Houston International Film Festival. The film's producers subsequently sought a distributor for a wider release.
