= James Browne (athlete) =

Antigua and Barbuda triple jumper

James Browne (born June 15, 1966) is a retired long jumper, who finished in 17th position at the 1988 Summer Olympics in Seoul, South Korea, as a representative of Antigua and Barbuda.

He attended Abilene Christian University in Texas where he was a member of the Abilene Christian Wildcats.
