= Abilene Christian University Press =

Texas-based university press

- Parent company: Abilene Christian University
- Founded: 1984
- Founder: J.D. Thomas
- Headquarters location: Abilene, Texas, United States
- Key people: C. Leonard Allen
- Publication types: Books
- Imprints: Leafwood Publishers
- Official website: www.acupressbooks.com

Abilene Christian University Press, also known as ACU Press, is an Abilene, Texas-based university press that is connected with Abilene Christian University. Since being formed it has released or acquired 456 titles and as of 2013 the press releases, on average, thirty-six titles per year. The press is a member of the Association of University Presses. The press publishes works in the areas of "Christianity and Literature; Faith-Based Higher Education; History and Theology of the Stone-Campbell Movement; Texas History and Culture." Leafwood Publishers is an imprint of ACU Press.

== Notable authors ==
- C. Leonard Allen
- James Burton Coffman
- Everett Ferguson
- Douglas A. Foster
- Gary Holloway
- Larry M. James
- Walt McDonald
- Michael A. O'Donnell
- Rick Ostrander
- Jerry Pattengale
- Rubel Shelly
- Darryl Tippens
- Jeanne Murray Walker

== See also ==
- List of English-language book publishing companies
- List of university presses
- Academic publishing
