= Songa =

- Town
- Location in Burundi
- Coordinates: 3°51′38.88″S 29°43′10.52″E
- Country: Burundi
- Province: Bururi Province
- Commune: Commune of Songa
- Elevation: 1,800 m (5,900 ft)
- Time zone: UTC+2 (Central Africa Time)

Songa is a Burundian town and colline, seat of the Commune of Songa, in Bururi Province.

== Geography ==
The town is located on a plain in the central-eastern area of its municipality; and is crossed by the national road RN 16 and by the provincial road RP 403. It is 15 km far from Matana, 20 from Bururi and 103 from Bujumbura, the largest city and former capital.

== Personalities ==
- Gilbert Tuhabonye (b. 1974), Burundian-American philanthropist and sportsman
