= Sally Gary =

American lawyer

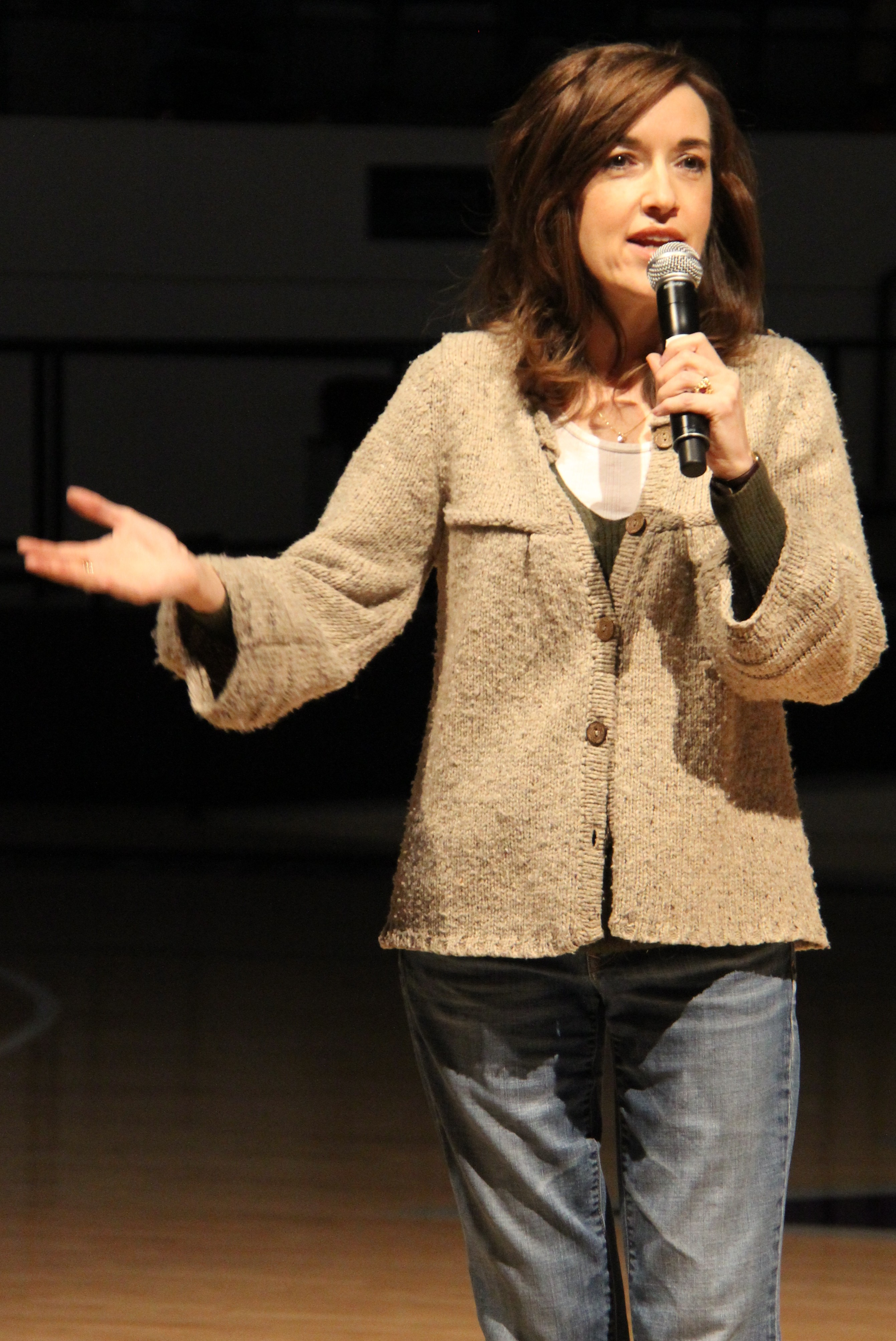
- Gary speaks at ACU Chapel in 2014
- Born: September 19, 1961 (age 65); Wichita Falls, Texas
- Education: Abilene Christian University, Texas Tech University
- Employer: CenterPeace

Sally Gary (born September 19, 1961) is a Christian speaker and author on faith and sexuality. She is founder of CenterPeace, a 501(c)(3) nonprofit organization that fosters belonging for LGBTQ people in the Church, as well as provides resources for Christian leaders, parents, and organizations to respond in Christ-like ways to the LGBTQ community. Gary is the subject of the 2020 biographical documentary Loves God, Likes Girls by Film Mavericks.

== Life ==
Gary was born in Wichita Falls, Texas. She grew up going to Tenth and Broad Church of Christ in Wichita Falls. She graduated from Abilene Christian University and Texas Tech University School of Law. In 2006, Gary founded CenterPeace, a nonprofit ministry to create safe spaces for Christians to talk about sexuality. Gary also taught at Abilene Christian University in the department of communication from 2001 to 2011. In 2013, she authored Loves God, Likes Girls, a memoir telling the story of her own journey experiencing same-sex attraction, focusing particularly on her childhood and family relationships. In 2021, Gary published a sequel Affirming: A Memoir of Faith, Sexuality, and Staying in the Church. It recounts her shift to becoming theologically affirming of same-sex relationships, while remaining devoted to her faith.

== Education ==
- B.S.Ed Abilene Christian University (1983)
- M.A. Abilene Christian University (1985)
- J.D. Texas Tech University (1998)

== Publications ==
- Affirming: A Memoir of Faith, Sexuality, and Staying in the Church, Grand Rapids, Michigan: Eerdmans Publishing, 2021. ISBN 978-0-8028-7917-2.
- Loves God, Likes Girls: A Memoir, Abilene, Texas: Leafwood Publishers, 2013. ISBN 978-0-89112-359-0.
