= Everett Ferguson =

American academic (born 1933)

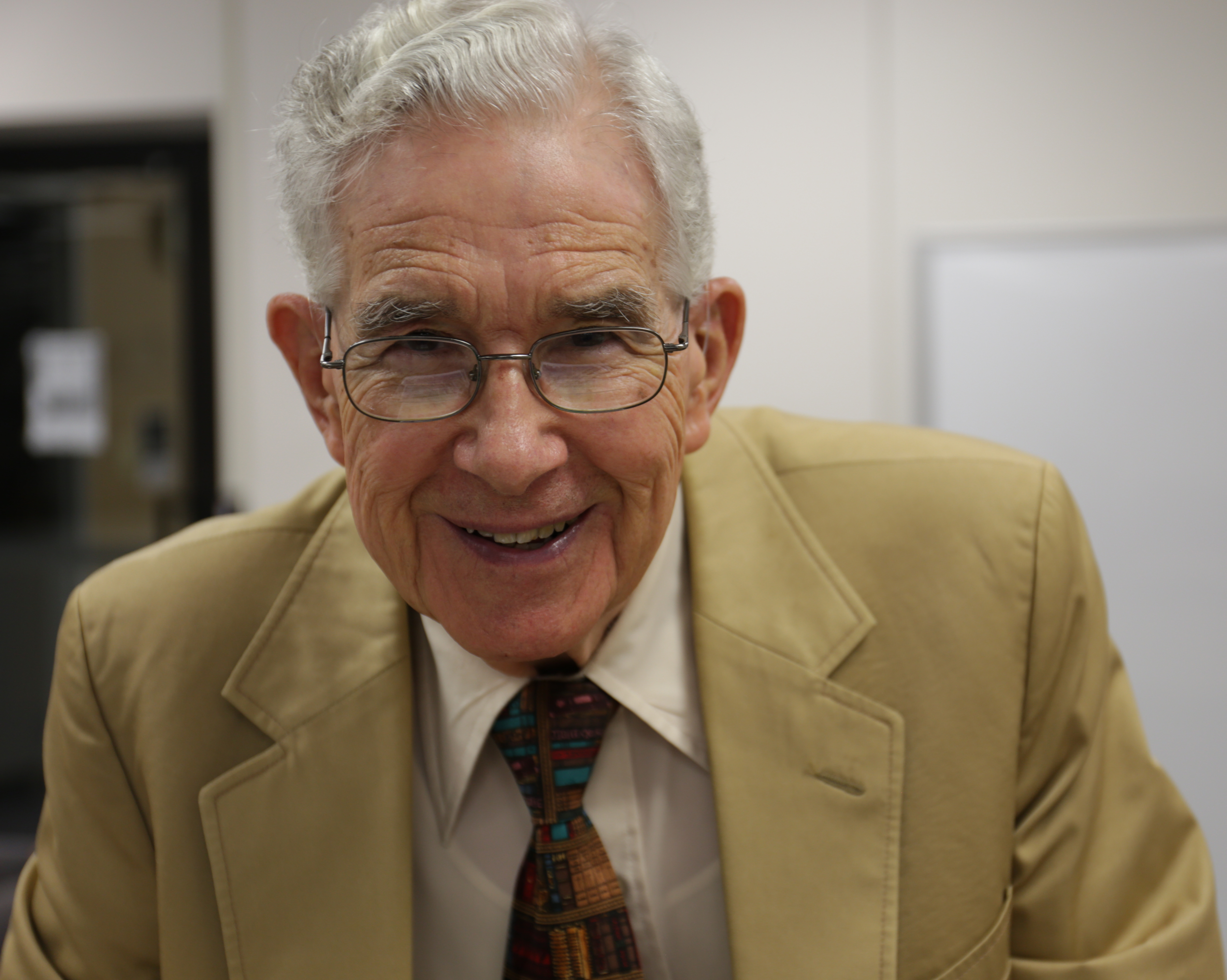
- Ferguson in 2014
- Born: February 18, 1933 (age 93); United States
- Education: Abilene Christian University, Harvard University
- Occupation: Professor
- Employer: Abilene Christian University
- Known for: Early Christianity
- Spouse(s): Nancy Ann Lewis Ferguson (m. June 25th, 1956; d. July 16, 2020)
- Children: 3

Everett Ferguson (born February 18, 1933) currently serves as Distinguished Scholar in Residence at Abilene Christian University in Abilene, Texas. He is author of numerous books on early Christian studies and served as co-editor of the Journal of Early Christian Studies.

== Early life and education ==
Ferguson received both his undergraduate bachelor's degree and his first master's degree from Abilene Christian University in the mid-1950s. He immediately proceeded to Harvard University and received his Bachelor of Sacred Theology followed by a doctoral degree "with distinction" in History and Philosophy of Religion.

== Awards and honors ==
During his education, Ferguson received such honors as the Honorary John Harvard Fellowship and Harvard Graduate School Fellowship. He later received awards from the Christian Research Foundation for both his dissertation, "Ordination in the Ancient Church," and for a translation of Gregory of Nyssa's Life of Moses. He was selected to speak as the John G. Gammie Senior Lecturer of the Southwest Commission for Religious Studies. He was later presented with a festschrift, The Early Church in Its Context: Essays in Honor of Everett Ferguson.

== Memberships ==
Dr. Ferguson was a council member of the Association Internationale D'Etudes Patristiques, which seeks "to promote the study of Christian antiquity, especially the Fathers of the Church, without prejudice to work undertaken in this domain in various countries." He served for a term on the council of the American Society of Church History, and has also previously served as president of the North American Patristics Society (1990–1992), from which he received the Distinguished Service Award for more than thirty years of service.

== Bibliography ==
Monographs

- The Early Church at Work and Worship. Vol 3 (Eugene, OR: Wipf and Stock, 2017.) ISBN 9781498285902
- The Rule of Faith: A Guide. (Eugene, OR: Cascade Books, 2015.) ISBN 9781625647597
- Women in the Church: Biblical and Historical Perspective. (Abilene, TX: Desert Willow Publishing, 2015.) ISBN 9781939838193
- The Early Church at Work and Worship. Vol 2 (Eugene, OR: Wipf and Stock, 2014.) ISBN 9781498205528
- The Early Church and Today. Vol. 2 (Abilene, TX: Abilene Christian University Press, 2014.) ISBN 9780891125846
- A Cappella Music in the Public Worship of the Church. (Abilene, TX: Desert Willow Publishing, 2013.) ISBN 9781939838032
- Church History: From Christ to Pre-Reformation. 2nd ed. (Grand Rapids: Zondervan, 2013.) ISBN 9780310516569
- The Early Church at Work and Worship. Vol 1 (Eugene, OR: Wipf and Stock, 2013.) ISBN 9781498212533
- The Early Church and Today. Vol. 1 (Abilene, TX: Abilene Christian University Press, 2011.) ISBN 9780891125860
- Thinking--Living--Dying: Early Apologists Speak to the 21st Century. (Vienna, WV: Warren Christian Apologetics Center, 2010.) ISBN 9781936548019
- Baptism in the Early Church: History, Theology, and Liturgy in the First Five Centuries. (Grand Rapids, MI: Eerdmans Publishing Co., 2009.) ISBN 9780802871084
- Church History: From Christ to Pre-Reformation. (Grand Rapids: Zondervan, 2005.) ISBN 978-0310205807
- Inheriting Wisdom: Readings for Today from Ancient Christian Writers. (Peabody, MA: Hendrickson Publishers, 2004.) ISBN 978-1565633544
- Women in the Church. (Chickasha, OK: Yeomen Press, 2003.)
- Backgrounds of Early Christianity. (Grand Rapids, MI: Eerdmans Publishing Co., 1987; 3rd ed., 2003.) ISBN 978-0802822215
- Early Christians Speak. Vol. 2 (Abilene, Texas: Abilene Christian University Press, 2002.) ISBN 0-89112-046-7
- Early Christians Speak. Vol. 1, 3rd ed. (Abilene, Texas: Abilene Christian University Press, 1999.) ISBN 0-89112-045-9
- Some Contemporary Issues Concerning Worship and the Christian Assembly. (Ohio Valley College, 1998).
- The Church of Christ: A Biblical Ecclesiology for Today. (Grand Rapids, MI: Eerdmans Publishing Co., 1996.) ISBN 978-0802841896
- Church History, Early and Medieval. 2nd ed. (Abilene, Texas: Abilene Christian University Press, 1996.) ISBN 978-0891121060
- Justin Martyr on Jews, Christians and the Covenant. (Franciscan Printing Press, 1993.)
- The Everlasting Kingdom: The Kingdom of God in Scripture and in Our Lives. (Abilene, Texas: Abilene Christian University Press, 1989.)
- A Cappella Music in the Public Worship of the Church. 2nd ed. (Abilene, Texas: Abilene Christian University Press, 1988). ISBN 0891121250
- Backgrounds of Early Christianity. (Grand Rapids, MI: Eerdmans Publishing Co., 1987). ISBN 0802802923
- Acts of the Apostles: The Message of the New Testament. 2 vols. (Abilene, Texas: Abilene Christian University Press, 1986.)
- Demonology of the Early Christian World. (Em Text, 1984) ISBN 9780773408548
- The Message of the New Testament: The Letters of John. (Abilene, TX: Biblical Research Press.) ISBN 0891121757
- The New Testament Church. (Abilene, Texas: Abilene Christian University Press, 1984.) ISBN 9780891125235
- Inscriptions and the Origin of Infant Baptism. (Oxford: Clarendon Press, 1979).
- Progress in Perfection: Gregory of Nyssa's Vita Moysis. (Berlin, Akademie-Verlag, 1976)
- Church History: Reformation and Modern. (Abilene, Texas: Abilene Christian University Press, 1967.) ISBN 978-0891121077
- Church History: Early and Medieval. (Abilene, Texas: Abilene Christian University Press, 1966.)

Edited Publications

- Understandings of the Church, ed. (Minneapolis: Fortress Press, 2016.) ISBN 9781451496369
- Encyclopedia of Early Christianity, ed. (New York: Garland Publishing, 1990; 2nd ed.,1997. It later came out as an paperback in 1999 and it has been around ever since.) ISBN 978-0815333197
- Recent Studies in Early Christianity, ed., 6 vols. (New York: Garland Publishing, 1999.)
- Christianity and Society: The Social World of Early Christianity. (New York: Garland Publishing, 1999.)
- Christianity in Relation to Jews, Greeks, and Romans. (New York: Garland Publishing, 1999.) ISBN 0815330693
- Doctrinal Diversity: Varieties of Early Christianity. (New York: Garland Publishing, 1999.) ISBN 0815330715
- Forms of Devotion: Conversion, Worship, Spirituality, and Asceticism. (New York: Garland Publishing, 1999.) ISBN 9780815330721
- History, Hope, Human Language, and Christian Reality. (New York: Garland Publishing, 1999.) ISBN 9780815333388
- Norms of Faith and Life. (New York: Garland Publishing, 1999.) ISBN 9780815330707
- Studies in Early Christianity, ed., 18 vols. (New York: Garland Publishing, 1993.)
- Acts of Piety in the Early Church. (New York: Garland Publishing, 1993). ISBN 0815310773
- The Bible in the Early Church. (New York: Garland Publishing, 1993.) ISBN 0815310633
- Christian Life: Ethics, Morality, and Discipline in the Early Church. (New York: Garland Publishing, 1993.) ISBN 0815310765
- Church and State in the Early Church. (New York: Garland Publishing, 1993.) ISBN 0815310676
- Church, Ministry, and Organization in the Early Church Era. (New York: Garland Publishing, 1993.) ISBN 0815310730
- Doctrines of God and Christ in the Early Church. (New York: Garland Publishing, 1993.) ISBN 0815310692
- Early Christianity and Judaism. (New York: Garland Publishing, 1993.) ISBN 0815310668
- Literature of the Early Church. (New York: Garland Publishing, 1993.) ISBN 0815310625
- Missions and Regional Characteristics of the Early Church. (New York: Garland Publishing, 1993.) ISBN 0815310722
- Orthodoxy, Heresy, and Schism in Early Christianity. (New York: Garland Publishing, 1993.) ISBN 0815310641
- Personalities of the Early Church. (New York: Garland Publishing, 1993.) ISBN 0815310617
- Worship in Early Christianity. (New York: Garland Publishing, 1993.) ISBN 0815310757
- Greeks Romans, and Christians: Essays in Honor of Abraham J. Malherbe. ed. with David L. Balch & Wayne A. Meeks. (Minneapolis: Fortress Press, 1990)
- Christian Teaching: Studies in Honor of LeMoine G. Lewis, ed. (Abilene, TX: Abilene Christian University Press, 1981)
