= Gary G. Hamilton =

American journalist

Gary G. Hamilton is an American television journalist, on-air host, reporter and producer who has worked in news, sports, music and entertainment. Hamilton currently works as Entertainment Video Journalist and Producer for The Associated Press. He used to be the on-air TV host-reporter for the New York Yankees Scoreboard and broadcasting department. Formerly, he was a digital reporter for Channel One News, a youth-oriented news program broadcast in 8,000 high schools and middle schools across the country, reaching more than six million students daily. He was also a frequent on-air contributing reporter for CBSNews.com. Hamilton has also worked for NBC News, CBS News, MTV and Globestar Media/ND Promotions, an entertainment and music video promotions company. He was also a freelance music writer for the music website AllHipHop.com and had a stint with SONY BMG's Columbia Records.

== Biography ==
Gary G. Hamilton was born and raised in Houston, Texas, and is a graduate of North Shore Senior High School. Involved in many different clubs and activities, Hamilton was the co-anchor for the school's in-house newscast, Mustang News, which aired directly after Channel One News. Upon graduation, he attended Abilene Christian University and received a BSc. in broadcast journalism. After internships with KPRC-TV 2, the local NBC affiliate in Houston, Houston's Majic 102.1, 979 the Box, and BET's 106 and Park, Hamilton was accepted into NBC's Page Program.

Hamilton moved to New York from Houston to join the Page Program. After his experience at NBC, he worked at MTV, followed by Columbia Records. At the same time, he was assisting local Houston rapper Mike Jones of Swisha House as Houston's local rap scene exploded onto the national scene. He was also working Noah Jolles and Dan Otero of ND Promotions, a music video promotions company and was a freelance music critic for AllHipHop.com.

In 2009, Hamilton moved to Channel One News, which was partnered with NBC. Hamilton was hired as an overnight production assistant. He also hosted Channel One's "Next Big Thing", a weekly entertainment and tech segment. During his time at Channel One News with NBC News, he also worked with the weekend edition of NBC's TODAY. Most notably, he helped produce segments for TODAY's coverage of the 2008 Olympic Games in Beijing.

Channel One News went on to partner with CBS News and at the same time, Hamilton became a contributing reporter with CBSNews.com. Hamilton dually worked with Channel One and CBSNews.com until he was hired by the New York Yankees in 2013. Hamilton was the on-air host and in-stadium reporter and senior producer for the New York Yankees Broadcasting and Scoreboard department.

In 2018, Hamilton moved to the Associated Press as Video Journalist.

== Recognitions and notable works ==
Gary Hamilton's Channel One News story on African-American inventors in which he reported and produced is now permanently part of an exhibit in the Charles H. Wright Museum of African American History.
