= Tennessee Bible College =

Bible college in Cookeville, Tennessee, USA

- Motto: "Bible-Centered Higher Education"
- Type: Private Bible college
- Established: 1975
- Affiliations: Churches of Christ
- President: David Hill
- Students: 135
- Location: Cookeville, Tennessee, (United States); 36.1555°N 85.4675°W
- Website: www.tn-biblecollege.edu

Tennessee Bible College is a private Bible college located in Cookeville, Tennessee. It is affiliated with Churches of Christ. Tennessee Bible College is authorized by the Tennessee Higher Education Commission.

== History ==
Tennessee Bible College was founded in 1975 by the first president of the college, Malcolm Hill. His vision was to create a college to train preachers and Bible workers. Teaching the Bible only and no manmade doctrine or creed is the emphasis.

== Distance learning ==
Tennessee Bible College also has an online college, through which students can receive a degree or certificate. The college also has a free Bible correspondence course.

== Presidents ==
- David Hill: 2010–present
- Malcolm Hill: 1975–2010

== Notable faculty ==
- Thomas B. Warren, faculty member, Restoration theologian, and religious philosopher
- James McGill, faculty member, Restoration theologian, and religious philosopher
- Kerry Duke, faculty member, Restoration theologian, and religious philosopher
