= Douglas A. Foster =

American historian (born 1952)

Douglas Allen Foster
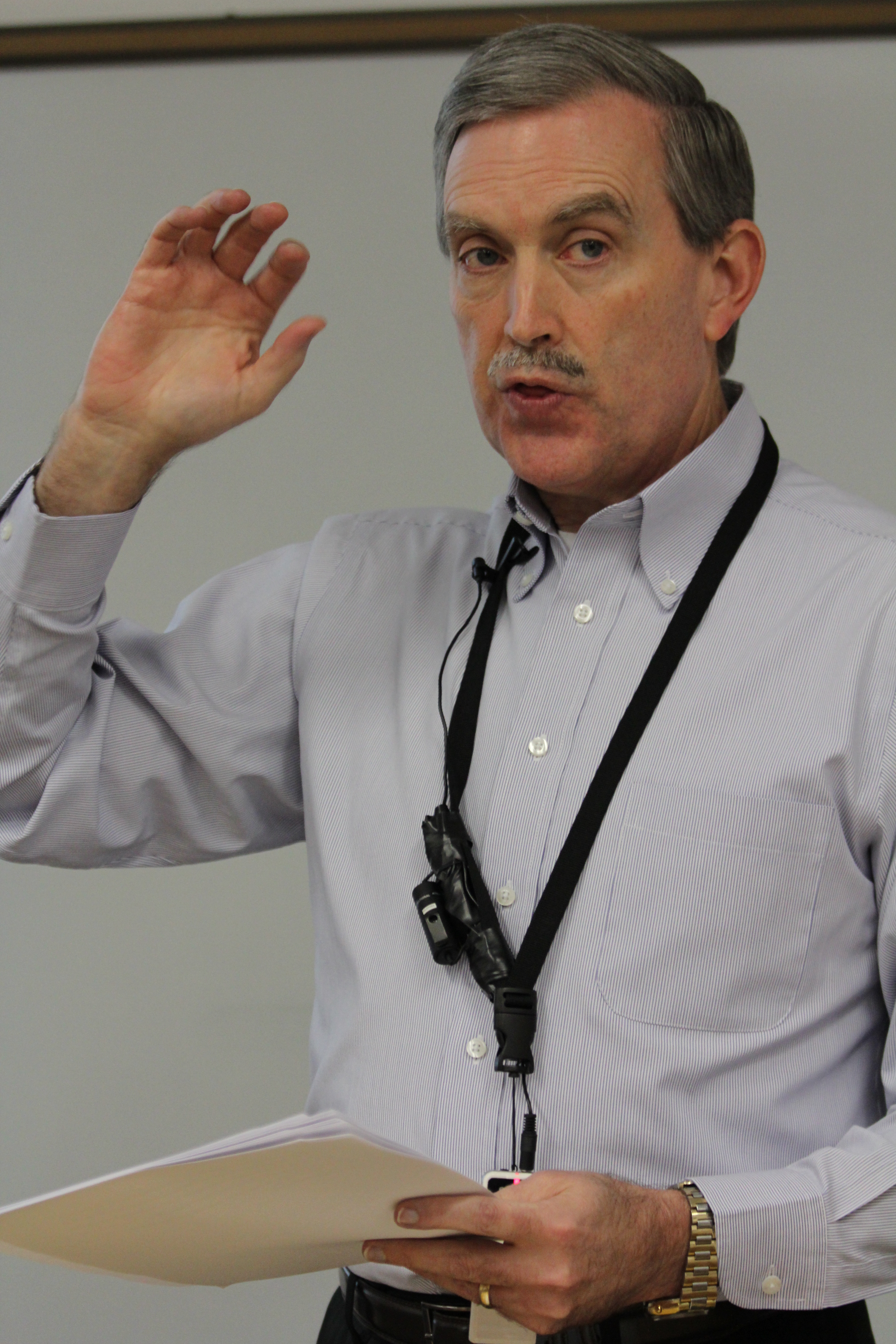
- Douglas Foster teaching at ACU's Summit in 2013.
- Born: August 30, 1952 (age 74)
- Education: Lipscomb University, Scarritt College, Vanderbilt University
- Employer: Abilene Christian University

Douglas A. Foster (born August 30, 1952) is an American author and scholar known for his work on the history of Stone-Campbell Restoration Movement.

== Life ==
Douglas A. Foster was born in Sheffield, Alabama. He grew up in Tuscumbia, Alabama. Upon completing his undergraduate degree at Lipscomb University in 1974, he became an associate minister at Jackson Park Church of Christ in Nashville, Tennessee where he served until 1983. While there he completed his graduate work at Scarritt College. He began teaching at Lipscomb University in 1985 where he taught church history. While there he completed his Ph.D. at Vanderbilt University. In 1988, Foster also began working as an archivist for Gospel Advocate magazine while working at Lipscomb University. In August 1991, he moved to Abilene Christian University where he has taught church history ever since. In June 2006, Foster was appointed Associate Dean of the Graduate School of Theology where he served until 2008. In 1994, Foster was named the Director of the Center for Restoration Studies located in Abilene Christian University's Brown Library. He has authored numerous publications concerned with the history of the Stone-Campbell Movement.

== Education ==
- B.A. Lipscomb University (1974)
- M.A. Scarritt College (1980)
- Ph.D. Vanderbilt University (1986)

== Publications ==
Author

- Will the Cycle Be Unbroken?: Churches of Christ Face the 21st Century. Abilene, Texas: Abilene Christian University Press, 1994. ISBN 1-57233-179-8.
- American Origins of Churches of Christ, with Richard Hughes, Nathan O. Hatch, David Edwin Harrell, Abilene, Texas: Abilene Christian University Press, 1994. ISBN 978-0-89112-009-4.
- The Crux of the Matter: Crisis, Tradition, and the Future of Churches of Christ. Abilene, Texas: Abilene Christian University Press, 2002. ISBN 0-89112-036-X, ISBN 978-0-89112-036-0.
- Renewing God's People: A Concise History of Churches of Christ, Abilene, Texas: Abilene Christian University Press, 2002. ISBN 978-0-89112-010-0.
- Seeking a Lasting City: The Church’s Journey in the Story of God, Abilene, Texas: Abilene Christian University Press, 2005. ISBN 978-0-89112-039-1.
- One Church: A Bicentennial Celebration of Thomas Campbell’s Declaration and Address, Abilene, Texas: Abilene Christian University Press, 2008. ISBN 978-0-89112-565-5.
- Renewal For Mission - A Concise History of Christian Churches and Churches of Christ, Abilene, Texas: Abilene Christian University Press, 2009. ISBN 978-0-89112-534-1.
- Renewing Christian Unity: A Concise History of the Christian Church (Disciples of Christ), with Gary Holloway, Mark Toulouse, Abilene, Texas: Abilene Christian University Press, 2011. ISBN 978-0-89112-543-3.
- The Story of the Churches of Christ, Abilene, Texas: Abilene Christian University Press, 2013. ISBN 978-0-89112-463-4.
- A Life of Alexander Campbell, Grand Rapids, Michigan: Eerdmans, 2020. ISBN 978-0-8028-7633-1.

Editor

- The Stone-Campbell Movement: An International Religious Tradition. Knoxville, Tennessee: University of Tennessee Press, 2002. ISBN 1-57233-179-8.
- The Encyclopedia of the Stone-Campbell Movement. Grand Rapids, Michigan: Wm. B. Eerdmans Publishing Company, 2004. ISBN 0-8028-3898-7, ISBN 978-0-8028-3898-8.

== Personal life ==
Foster is married to Mary Linda Grissom Foster (née 1948). They have a daughter, Mary Elizabeth, and a son, Mark.
