= Leafwood Publishers =

American imprint of Abilene Christian University Press located in Abilene, Texas, USA

- Parent company: Abilene Christian University Press
- Founded: 2000; 26 years ago
- Founder: C. Leonard Allen
- Country of origin: United States
- Headquarters location: Abilene, Texas
- Publication types: Christian Books
- Imprints: Leafwood Heritage
- Official website: leafwoodpublishers.com

Leafwood Publishers (founded in 2000) is an American imprint of Abilene Christian University Press located in Abilene, Texas.

== History ==
Leafwood Publishers was founded in 2000 by C. Leonard Allen in Orange, California. By 2004, it was moved in Siloam Springs, Arkansas near John Brown University.

In 2005, Leafwood Publishers was purchased by Abilene Christian University Press and was relocated to Abilene, Texas where it currently is located.

== Notable authors ==
- Edward Fudge
- Sally Gary
- Gary Holloway
- Rubel Shelly
- Darryl Tippens
