= Matana =

- Town
- Location in Burundi
- Coordinates: 3°46′01.2″S 29°41′30.0″E
- Country: Burundi
- Province: Bururi Province
- Commune: Commune of Matana
- Elevation: 1,900 m (6,200 ft)
- Time zone: UTC+2 (Central Africa Time)

Matana is a Burundian town and colline, seat of the Commune of Matana, in Bururi Province.

== Geography ==
It is a mountain town is located at 1,900 metres (6,200 ft), and is crossed in the middle by the national highway RN7, that links Bujumbura (94 km northwest), the largest city and former capital, to the town of Rutana (49 km southeast). It is 15 km north of Songa, 30 km north of Bururi, and the nearest places are the villages of Rubanga and Butwe.

== Religion ==
Matana is the seat of the homonym Anglican diocese, part of the Province of the Anglican Church of Burundi.
