= Commune of Songa =

Coordinates: 3°48′46″S 29°36′33″E

- Commune
- Interactive map of Commune of Songa
- Country: Burundi
- Province: Bururi Province
- Administrative center: Songa
- Time zone: UTC+2 (Central Africa Time)

The commune of Songa is a commune of Bururi Province in south-western Burundi. The capital lies at Songa.

== Personalities ==
- Gilbert Tuhabonye (b. 1974), Burundian-American philanthropist and sportsman
