= Jeanne Murray Walker =

American poet and playwright (born 1944)

- Born: May 27, 1944 (age 82); Parkers Prairie, Minnesota
- Education: Wheaton College; Loyola University; The University of Pennsylvania
- Occupation: Writer
- Spouse: E. Daniel Larkin III
- Writing career
- Genre: Poetry

Jeanne Murray Walker (born May 27, 1944) is an American poet and playwright.

== Life ==
Jeanne Murray was born on May 27, 1944, in Parkers Prairie, Minnesota, the daughter of John Gerald and Erna Murray. In 1965, she won the Atlantic Monthly Award for both fiction and Poetry and was named the Atlantic Monthly Scholar at Bread Loaf School of English. She graduated from Wheaton College in Illinois with a B.A. in English in 1966. In 1969 she received an M.A. from Loyola University, and in 1974, she was granted a Ph.D. in English from The University of Pennsylvania.

Walker's poems and essays have appeared in Poetry, The Georgia Review, Image, The Atlantic Monthly, Best American Poetry and many other journals. Her plays have been staged across the United States and in London. Among her awards are an NEA Fellowship, an Atlantic Monthly Fellowship, and a Pew Fellowship in The Arts. In 2005 she hosted a documentary about poetry in Pennsylvania, which was broadcast and rebroadcast on television and the web. A selection from her "Aunt Joe Poems" was featured on buses and trains with the Poetry in Motion project. A professor of English at The University of Delaware, Jeanne also teaches in the Seattle Pacific Low Residency MFA Program.

Walker has two children and three grandchildren. She is married to E. Daniel Larkin III and lives in Merion Station, Pennsylvania.

== Major works ==
=== Poetry ===
- New Tracks, Night Falling, Grand Rapids, MI: Wm. B. Eerdmans, 2009.
- A Deed to the Light, University of Illinois Press, Urbana and Chicago, 2004.
- Gaining Time, Copper Beech Press, Providence, RI, 1998.
- Stranger Than Fiction, QRL, Princeton, NJ, 1992.
- Coming Into History, Cleveland State University Press, Cleveland, OH, 1990.
- Fugitive Angels, Dragon Gate Press, Port Townsend, WA, 1985.
- Nailing Up The Home Sweet Home, Cleveland State University Press, Cleveland, OH, 1980.

=== Drama ===
- "The Queen, the Earl, and the Waiting Woman," CITA Anthology, 2009.
- "Inventing Montana," Woodstock, Illinois: Dramatic Publishing Company, 2002.
- "Tales From The Daily Tabloid," Woodstock, Illinois: Dramatic Publishing Company, 2002.
- Collected Plays, North American Women's Drama, women playwrights in English, Alexander Street Press, on line through U.S. and Canadian university and college libraries.

=== Other work ===
- Memoir: The Geography of Memory: A Pilgrimage through Alzheimers
- Short fiction in magazines such as The Southern Review and Redbook
- Essays in periodicals such as Image and Midwest Quarterly
- Shadow & Light: Literature and the Life of Faith, 3rd Edition, 1300–2000, Ed. Darryl Tippens, Stephen Weathers, and Jeanne Murray Walker, Abilene, TX: Abilene Christian University Press, 2013 ISBN 978-0-89112-070-4.

== Awards ==
- Glenna Luschei Poetry Prize
- Pew Fellowship in Poetry
- National Endowment for the Arts Fellowship
- Eight Pennsylvania Council on the Arts Fellowships
- Readers' Choice Award for Poetry, Prairie Schooner
- Washington National Theatre Competition New Play Award
- The Virginia Duvall Mann New Play Award
- Fellow, University of Delaware Center For Advanced Study
- Associated Writing Programs Award for Poetry
- Atlantic Monthly Fellowship for Poetry and Fiction, Bread Loaf School of English
