= Commune of Matana =

Coordinates: 3°44′35″S 29°40′14″E

- Commune
- Interactive map of Commune of Matana
- Country: Burundi
- Province: Bururi Province
- Administrative center: Matana
- Time zone: UTC+2 (Central Africa Time)

The commune of Matana is a commune of Bururi Province in south-western Burundi. The capital lies at Matana.
