= Rick Ostrander =

American academic

- Born: Richard S. Ostrander
- Occupations: Executive Director, Michigan Christian Study Center
- Spouse: Lonnie Ostrander
- Awards: Fulbright Scholar

Academic background
- Education: Moody Bible Institute; University of Michigan; University of Notre Dame
- Doctoral advisor: George Marsden

Academic work
- Institutions: Michigan Christian Study Center
- Notable works: Academically Speaking

Richard S. Ostrander, known as Rick Ostrander, is a U.S. historian and higher education leader. He serves as Executive Director for the Michigan Christian Study Center in Ann Arbor, Michigan.

== Career ==
After earning a PhD in history from the University of Notre Dame under the direction of George Marsden, Ostrander taught at Grand Canyon University in Phoenix, Arizona. In 1997, Ostrander became an assistant professor of history at John Brown University in Siloam Springs, Arkansas. In September 2002, he became the dean of undergraduate studies at John Brown University. In 2004, he was selected as a Fulbright Scholar to teach in Wurzburg,Germany. From 2009 to 2015, he served as provost at Cornerstone University in Grand Rapids, Michigan. Ostrander became Vice President for Academic Affairs & Professional Programs at the Council for Christian Colleges and Universities (CCCU), Washington, DC in 2015. During the pandemic, Ostrander worked for Acadeum, an online course-sharing network. In 2021 he served as Assistant to the President for Academic Innovation at Westmont College in Santa Barbara, California. Ostrander began his role as Executive Director for the Michigan Christian Study Center in 2023.

== Education ==
- B.A. Moody Bible Institute (1987)
- B.A. University of Michigan (1990)
- M.A. University of Notre Dame (1992)
- Ph.D. University of Notre Dame (1996)

== Publications ==
Author

- The Life of Prayer in a World of Science: Protestants, Prayer, and American Culture, 1870-1930, New York City: Oxford University Press, 2000. ISBN 978-0-19513-610-4.
- Head, Heart, Hand: John Brown University and Evangelical Higher Education, Fayetteville, Arkansas: University of Arkansas Press, 2003. ISBN 978-1-55728-761-8.
- Why College Matters to God: An Introduction to the Christian College, Abilene, Texas: Abilene Christian University Press, 2009. ISBN 978-0-89112-535-8.
- Why College Matters to God, Revised Edition: An Introduction to the Christian College, Abilene, Texas: Abilene Christian University Press, 2012. ISBN 978-0-89112-323-1.
- Academically Speaking, Grand Rapids, Michigan: Eerdmans Publishing Company, 2024. ISBN 978-0-8028-8339-1.

Contributor

- Searching for Spirituality in Higher Education, New York City: Peter Lang Publishing, 2007. ISBN 978-0-8204-8159-3.
- American Evangelicalism : George Marsden and the State of American Religious History, Notre Dame, Indiana: University of Notre Dame Press, 2014. ISBN 9780268038427.

== Personal life ==
Rick is married to Lonnie. They have four children.
