= Rubel Shelly =

Author, minister, & professor (born 1945)

- Born: Thomas Rubel Shelly; November 27, 1945 (age 80)
- Education: Harding University; Vanderbilt University
- Occupations: Theologian; Christian minister; author
- Employer: Lipscomb University

Rubel Shelly is an author, minister, and former Philosophy professor at Lipscomb University. He is the former president of the then Rochester College. He has a notable interest in ecumenism.

== Life ==
Shelly began as an instructor in the department of Religion and Philosophy at Freed-Hardeman University in 1975. In 1978, Shelly began preaching for the Ashwood Church of Christ, which later merged with the Green Hills Church of Christ to become the Woodmont Hills Church of Christ, which in turn later became known as the Family of God at Woodmont Hills, in Nashville, Tennessee, where he continued until 2005. From 1979 to 1980 while he worked to complete his graduate work at Vanderbilt University, he served as a graduate assistant in the Department of Philosophy. From 1981 to 1983, he was an Assistant Professor of Philosophy at Lipscomb University.

When Shelly stepped down from the pulpit in 2005, he began teaching again as a Professor of Philosophy and Religion at Rochester College (now Rochester Christian University), in Rochester Hills, Michigan. He was named the President of Rochester College in May 2009. He also served as a co-minister for the Bristol Road Church of Christ in Flint, Michigan. In late 2012, Shelly announced that he would be stepping from his role as President at Rochester College by September 2013.

Shelley is known primarily as a preacher. He has been involved in debates and academic lectures on Christian apologetics, ethics, and medical ethics. He has also served with such groups as the AIDS Education Committee of the American Red Cross.

== Changes in theological emphasis ==
Shelly's theological stance on several important issues abruptly shifted around 1986 from traditional Church of Christ theology. He began to voice a radical plea for Ecumenism, as indicated by his book, I Just Want to Be a Christian. He had started out as a boy preacher in the Churches of Christ, writing several books containing what some have called "sound teaching", yet eventually Shelly became disenchanted with what he has called a "language of exclusion." "Out of my own spiritual evolution, I've tried to adopt a much more Christ-like spirit and not be so sectarian and isolationist", Shelly said.

Now, Shelly pursues a unifying vision "more nearly the ideal of the early American Restoration Movement concept and experience than what [he] was born into." He critiques his former colleagues for trying to "decide who's in and who's out based on some list. We're very anticreedal in churches of Christ and Christian churches, meaning we won’t publish that list; we are more insidious in that we have unpublished lists of what lets you be "in" or "out" of our local churches. That's simply wrongheaded." In The Second Incarnation, Shelly and Randy Harris claim that this move is anachronistic and leads to doctrinal error, because no church has ever achieved perfection, and in any case, one cannot and should not attempt to recreate the first century Church.

Shelly has also co-edited and co-founded two important journals, Spiritual Sword in 1969 with Thomas B. Warren and Wineskins with Mike Cope.

== Education ==
- B.A. Harding University
- M.A. Harding School of Theology
- M. Th. Harding School of Theology
- M.A. Vanderbilt University
- Ph.D.Vanderbilt University

== Publications ==
Books

- Simple Study in Christian Evidences, Montgomery, Alabama: Bible & School Supply, 1970.
- Living By the Rules: The Contemporary Value of the Ten Commandments, Nashville, Tennessee: 20th Century Christian, 1982. ISBN 978-0-89098-508-3.
- The Lamb and His Enemies: Understanding the Book of Revelation, Nashville, Tennessee: 20th Century Christian Foundation, 1983. ISBN 978-0-89098-472-7.
- I Just Want to Be a Christian, Revised Edition, Nashville, Tennessee: 20th Century Christian, 1986. ISBN 978-0-89098-021-7.
- Sing His Praise!: A Case for A Cappella Music as Worship Today, Nashville, Tennessee: 20th Century Christian, 1987. ISBN 978-0-89098-080-4.
- The Divine Folly: A Theology for Preaching the Gospel, Nashville, Tennessee: 20th Century Christian, 1990.
- What Would Jesus Do Today?, with Mike Cope, West Monroe, Louisiana: Howard Books, 1998. ISBN 1-878990-79-9.
- Falling in Love with Jesus: Studies in the Book of Luke, Joplin, Missouri: College Press Publishing, 1998. ISBN 978-0-89900-802-8.
- Falling in Love with Jesus’ People: Studies in the Book of Acts, Joplin, Missouri: College Press Publishing, 1998. ISBN 978-0-89900-803-5.
- Starting Today: Stories and Scriptures for the Daily Grind, Nashville, Tennessee: B&H Publishing, 2001. ISBN 978-0-80543-780-5.
- The Names of Jesus, West Monroe, Louisiana: Howard Books, 2003. ISBN 978-1-58229-327-1.
- The Jesus Proposal: A Theological Framework for Maintaining the Unity of the Body of Christ. with John York, Siloam Springs, Arkansas: Leafwood Publishers, 2004. ISBN 0-9748441-1-X
- The Jesus Community, with John York, Siloam Springs, Arkansas: Leafwood Publishers, 2004. ISBN 0-9748441-3-6.
- The Second Incarnation, with Randy Harris, Abilene, Texas: Leafwood Publishers, 2004. ISBN 0-89112-484-5
- Divorce and Remarriage: A Redemptive Theology, Abilene, Texas: Leafwood Publishers, 2007. ISBN 978-0-89112-362-0.
- I Knew Jesus Before He Was a Christian and I liked Him Better Then, Abilene, Texas: Leafwood Publishers, 2011. ISBN 978-0-89112-271-5.

Articles

- "Loving the Person Who Isn't 'One of Us'" accessed 20 Dec, 2007.
- "What's All the Fuss? Code Breaks Itself with Obvious Errors"

== Bibliography ==
- "Dr. Rubel Shelly." accessed 20 Dec. 2007.
- "Rubel Shelly Inducted into Restoration Honor Roll: Religion professor Rubel Shelly was recently inducted into the Restoration Forum's Honor Roll of Unity." Oct. 2007. accessed 20 December.
- "Unity Celebration 2006." accessed 20 Dec. 2007.
- Edwards, Holly. "Rubel Shelly Leaving Church to Teach in Michigan College." The Tennessean. 02/01/05. Online edition. Accessed 11/19/07. Edwards reviews Shelly's tenure at Woodmont Hills Church of Christ and announces his move to Rochester College.
- Elliott, Raymond. "Book Review: The Jesus Proposal by Rubel Shelly & John O. York" accessed 20 Dec. 2007.
- Harper, Kevin. "Book Review: Divorce and Remarriage: A Redemptive Theology." 16 July 2007. accessed 20 Dec. 2007. (A review of a recent book by Shelly)
- Hughes, Richard T. Reviving the Ancient Faith: The Story of Churches of Christ in America. Abilene, Texas: Abilene Christian University Press, 1996. (Hughes' book charts Shelly's development from the Spiritual Sword days (328-29) to the shifts seen in the books I Just Want to Be a Christian and The Second Incarnation and finally to Wineskins (370-73).)
