= Sean Adams =

American academic and author

Sean Patrick Adams is an American academic and author. He is the Hyatt and Cici Brown Professor of History at the University of Florida. He specializes in the history of American capitalism and energy. Adams also leads the Inquire Capitalism program, which promotes scholarship in the history of capitalism through its flagship projects of Gainesville Business History and a catalog of business archives.

== Books ==
=== Author ===
- Home Fires: How Americans Kept Warm in the 19th Century (Johns Hopkins University Press, 2014)
- Old Dominion, Industrial Commonwealth: Coal, Politics, and Economy in Antebellum America (Johns Hopkins University Press, 2004)
- The American Coal Industry, 1789-1902 (2013)

=== Editor ===
- A Companion to the Era of Andrew Jackson (2013)
- The Early American Republic: A Documentary History (2009)
