= Mackenzie Astin =

American actor (born 1973)

- Born: Mackenzie Alexander Astin; May 12, 1973 (age 53); Los Angeles, California, U.S.
- Occupation: Actor
- Years active: 1982–present
- Spouse: Jennifer Bautz (m. 2011)
- Parents: John Astin (father); Patty Duke (mother)
- Relatives: Sean Astin (half-brother)

Mackenzie Alexander Astin (born May 12, 1973) is an American actor.

== Early and personal life ==
Astin was born on May 12, 1973, in Los Angeles, California, the son of actress Patty Duke and actor John Astin. His half brother is actor Sean Astin. (Note: Sean's biological father is Michael Tell; however, John Astin formally adopted him.) He attended Ralph Waldo Emerson Middle School and University High School in Los Angeles. He is married to Jennifer Abbott Astin (née Bautz).

== Career ==
Astin made his acting debut at age 9 in the TV movie Lois Gibbs and the Love Canal, and is often remembered for the adolescent television role of Andy Moffett over four seasons from 1985 to 1988 on the sitcom The Facts of Life. He has had recurring roles on Scandal, The Magicians, and Homeland, and has made guest appearances on LOST, House, Psych, Grey's Anatomy, and NCIS.

Astin has appeared in motion pictures including Iron Will, Wyatt Earp, The Evening Star, and Whit Stillman's The Last Days of Disco.

He starred in the movie Hell and Mr. Fudge in 2012.

In November 2020, Astin was cast in a recurring role on the third season of the Netflix psychological thriller series You.

== Filmography ==
Film
Year	Film	Role	Other notes
1987	The Garbage Pail Kids Movie	Dodger	
1994	Iron Will	Will Stoneman	
1994	Wyatt Earp	Young Man on Boat	
1996	Dream for an Insomniac	David Shrader	
1996	The Evening Star	Teddy Horton	
1996	In Love and War	Henry Villard	
1998	The Last Days of Disco	Jimmy Steinway	
1999	The Mating Habits of the Earthbound Human	The Male (Billy Waterson)	
2000	Stranger than Fiction	Jared Roth	
2001	The Zeros	Joe	
2002	Welcome 2 Ibiza	Nick	
2002	The Month of August	Nick	
2003	Two Days	Stephen Bell	
2003	How to Deal	Lewis Gibson Warsher II	
2004	Off the Lip	Brad	
2006	Duncan Removed	Duncan	Short film
2006	Military Intelligence and You!	Major Mitch Dunning	
2007	The Final Season	Chip Dolan	
2008	The Four Children of Tander Welch	William Dane	post-production
2012	Hell and Mr. Fudge	Edward Fudge	
2013	Lonely Boy	Bob	
2015	Moments of Clarity	Pastor Paul	
2015	Daddy	Paul	
2016	Do You Take This Man	Jacob	
2018	Windsor	Harry Barnett	
Television
Year	Title	Role	Notes
1982	Lois Gibbs and the Love Canal	Tony Belinski	CBS TV-Movie
1984	Finder of Lost Loves	Jeremy Warren	Episode: Old Friends
1985–88	The Facts of Life	Andy Moffett Stickle	main (seasons 7-9); recurring (season 6)
1985	Hail to the Chief	Dwight Stryker	Episode: 1.7
1985	I Dream of Jeannie... Fifteen Years Later	T.J. Nelson	NBC TV-Movie
1985	Hotel	Josh Erikson; Ben	Episode: New Beginnings; Episode: Cry Wolf
1987	The Facts of Life Down Under	Andy Moffett	NBC TV-Movie
1992	A Child Lost Forever: The Jerry Sherwood Story	Dennis Sherwood	NBC TV-Movie
1992–93	Brooklyn Bridge	Charlie Gallagher	Episodes: Rockette to the Moon, In a Family Way
1995	Harrison Bergeron	Golf Champion	TV-Movie; uncredited
1996	Widow's Kiss	Sean Sager	HBO TV-Movie
1998	The Long Island Incident	Kevin McCarthy	NBC TV-Movie
1999	Selma, Lord, Selma	Jonathan Daniels	ABC TV-Movie
2000	The Outer Limits	Patrick Tarloff	Episode: The Beholder (The Outer Limits)
2001	Laughter on the 23rd Floor (film)	Lucus Brickman	Showtime TV-Movie
2001	First Years	Warren Harrison	Episode: Touched by a Reindeer; Episode: There's No Place Like Homo
2001	Everything But the Girl	Bennett	Unsold TV-Pilot
2003	Without a Trace	Charles Beckworth	Episode: There Goes the Bride
2004	Love's Enduring Promise	Grant Thomas	Hallmark Channel TV-Movie
2005	Lost	Tom Brennan	Episode: Born to Run
2006	House	Alan	Episode: All In
2006	In from the Night	Rob Miller	CBS TV-Movie
2006	Pepper Dennis	Ken Alston	Episode: Pepper Dennis Behind Bars – Film at Eleven
2006	Justice	Robert Jones	Episode: Shark Week
2009	Psych	Jason Cunningham	Episode: Tuesday the 17th
2010	The Defenders	Paparazzo	Episode: Las Vegas vs. Johnson
2011	Grey's Anatomy	Danny Wilson	Episode: Free Falling; Episode: She's Gone
2011	Prime Suspect	Malcolm Ward	Episode: Bitch
2012	NCIS	Michael Rose	Episode: Life Before His Eyes
2012	Criminal Minds	Dylan Kohler	Episode: Divining Rod
2012	90210	Doctor	Episode: Til Death Do Us Part
2013	Bones	Dr. Ivan Jacobs	Episode: The Pathos in the Pathogens
2014–2017	Scandal	Noah Baker	Episode: Transfer of Power; Episode: Head Games; Episode: Trojan Horse; Episode: Baby, It's Cold Outside; Episode: Even the Devil Deserves a Second Chance; Episode: You Got Served; Episode: Paris Is Burning; Episode: Where the Sun Don't Shine; Episode: An Innocent Man; Episode: The Price of Free and Fair Elections; Episode: Mama Said Knock You Out
2015	Mad Men	Cliff Baur	Episode: Lost Horizon
2015	Agents of S.H.I.E.L.D.	Agent Timothy "Tim" Maguire	Episode: "One Door Closes"
2015	Castle	Phillip Bartlett	Episode: Sleeper
2015–2016	Rosewood	Dr. Max Cahn	Episode: Have-Nots and Hematomas; Episode: Quadriplegia and Quality Time; Episode: Negative Autopsies and New Partners
2016–2017	The Magicians	Richard/Reynard	Episode: The Fillorian Candidate; Episode: Do You Like Teeth? Episode: The Tales of the Seven Keys; Episode: Ramifications; Episode: The Rattening; Episode: Lesser Evils; Episode: Word as Bond; Episode: The Cock Barrens; Episode: Divine Elimination; Episode: Have You Brought Me Little Cakes; Episode: Thirty-Nine Graves; Episode: Remedial Battle Magic; Episode: Homecoming; Episode: The Writing Room; Episode: The Strangled Heart
2017	NCIS: New Orleans	Brian Davis	Episode: #1 Fan
2018	Homeland	Bill Dunn	Episode: Clarity; Episode: Useful Idiot; Episode: Lies, Amplifiers, F**king Twitter; Episode: Andante; Episode: Rebel Rebel; Episode: Enemy of the State
2018	Blue Bloods	Ryan Bennett	Episode: Risk Management
2019	The Orville	Lt. Orrin Channing	Episode: Blood of Patriots
2019	The Loudest Voice	John Moody	5 episodes
2020	Teenage Bounty Hunters	Anderson Wesley	Recurring role
2021	You	Gil Brigham	Recurring role
2021	Fantasy Island	Nathen	Episode: Welcome to the Snow Globe: Part 1 Episode: Welcome to the Snow Globe: Part 2
2022	Winning Time: The Rise of the Lakers Dynasty	Dr. Suskind	Episode: Acceptable Loss
2023	The Blacklist	Jonathan Pritchard	Episode: The Freelancer: Part 2
2023	Love & Death	Tom O’Connell	
2025	The Pitt	Jereme Spencer	Episode: 8:00 A.M. Episode: 9:00 A.M. Episode: 10:00 A.M.
2025	Stick	Gary Wheeler	Episode: Showtime; Episode: Déjà Vu All Over Again
2026	Landman	Detective Hayes	Episode: Tragedy and Flies
TBA	All the Sinners Bleed †	Deputy Pip Collins	Limited series

== Awards ==
CAMIE Awards

- 2005: Won, "Character and Morality in Entertainment" – Love's Enduring Promise (shared w/producers, co-stars)

Young Artist Awards

- 1986: Won, "Best Young Supporting Actor in a Television Series" – The Facts of Life
