= Walt McDonald =

American poet and former professor (1934–2022)

Walter Robert McDonald (July 18, 1934 – January 22, 2022, in Lubbock, Texas) was an American poet and former professor. He served as Poet Laureate of Texas in 2001. In May 2002, he retired from Texas Tech University as "Paul Whitfield Horn Professor of English" and "Poet in Residence".

== Career ==
After graduating from Texas Technological College and service in the United States Air Force in Vietnam, McDonald received a PhD from the University of Iowa.

McDonald's 23 books of poetry—published by Harper & Row (now HarperCollins) and university presses such as Ohio State; Notre Dame; Massachusetts; Pittsburgh; Texas Christian; Texas Tech—include Faith Is A Radical Master, 'Night Landing,' and A Thousand Miles of Stars. Before joining the faculty at Texas Tech University, he was a pilot in the Air Force and also taught at the Air Force Academy.

Some of his experiences as a pilot are reflected in his verses.
