= Harding School of Theology =

Coordinates: 35.248924409291575°N 91.72535698278708°W

Harding School of Theology, known until 2011 as Harding University Graduate School of Religion, is located in Searcy, Arkansas, United States, on the main campus of Harding University. Harding School of Theology exists primarily to train religious ministers for congregations of the Churches of Christ.

In 2011 the institution's administration announced the change of name, from Harding University Graduate School of Religion to Harding School of Theology. The name changed represented a "rebranding strategy that seeks to reflect better the School's goal of equipping and inspiring servants of Christ with deeper faith and higher standards of scholarship"—as indicated in the alumni magazine.

In the fall of 2024, HST moved from Memphis, Tennessee to its current home in Searcy, Arkansas.

== History ==
Harding University began offering graduate studies in Bible and ministry at its campus in Searcy, Arkansas, in 1952. In 1955 Harding started to offer these classes as an extension program in Memphis, and in 1958 the Harding University Graduate School of Religion (HUGSR) became a permanent branch of Harding University. Dr. W. B. West was the founding dean of HUGSR.

In 2023, the Harding University Board made the decision to move the school back to Searcy.

== Academics ==
Harding School of Theology is accredited by the Association of Theological Schools in the United States and Canada. It offers several degrees, including the Master of Arts (MA), Master of Arts in Christian Ministry, Master of Arts in Counseling, Master of Divinity (M.Div.), and Doctor of Ministry (D.Min.). Degrees may include emphasis or concentration options.

Approximately half of Harding School of Theology's 240 students live outside the Memphis region. Harding School of Theology offers courses on-line and in one-week intensive formats (in addition to the regular semester format) to accommodate these students.

== Campus ==
Harding School of Theology is housed in the McInteer Bible & World Missions Center, located on the north side of Harding University's campus.

Prior to moving to Searcy, the 13-acre (53,000 m^{2}) Harding School of Theology campus was located at 1000 Cherry Road in Memphis on land that used to be part of the E. L. King Ranch. The old ranch mansion housed the administrative and faculty offices. The W. B. West classroom building included an auditorium and hospitality room in addition to classrooms. Students who chose to live on campus rented one of 23 apartments in the Benson, Harding, and Brewer buildings. There was also a fitness center and a student lounge available to all students.

The L. M. Graves Memorial Library was built in 1964, and subsequent major additions were constructed in 1978 and 2006. The library contains over 140,000 book volumes and 24,000 periodical volumes, with 615 current subscriptions to periodicals and annuals. The library collection is specialized, focusing in areas relevant to Christian theology and ministry, including counseling.
