= Michael Birkin (executive) =

English global marketing executive (born 1958)

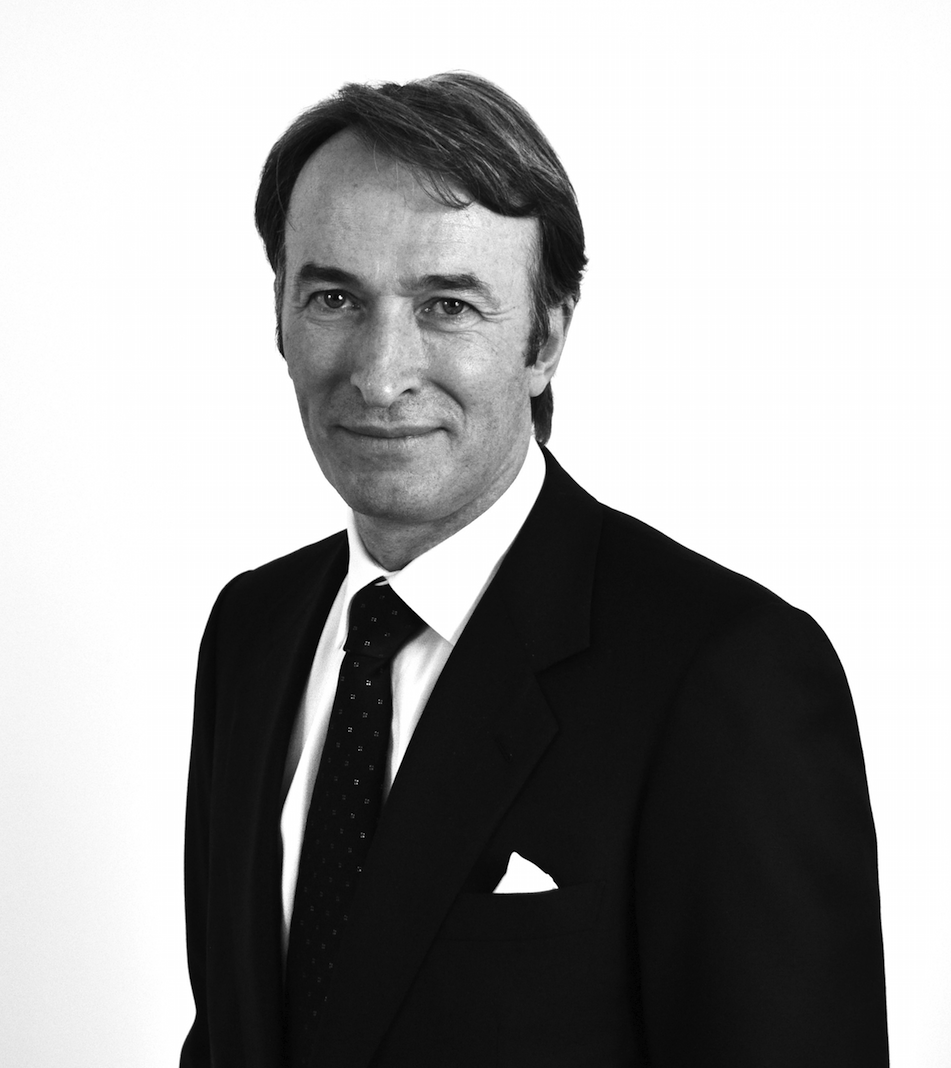
- Born: 1958 (age 67–68); England
- Education: University College London
- Occupation: Chairman
- Employer: The kyu unit of Hakuhodo DY Holdings (ja)
- Known for: Developing concept of brand valuation

Michael Birkin (born 1958) is an English marketing executive, notable for his role in developing the concept of brand valuation as well as for his involvement in marketing operations. He began his career at Interbrand in 1987, later working at Omnicom Group and Acer Inc. He founded his own marketing services company, Red Peak Group, in 2010. He is Chair of kyu, the strategic operating unit of Hakuhodo DY Holdings.

== Background ==
Michael Birkin was born in England in 1958. Birkin's father, Sir Derek Birkin, was CEO of Rio Tinto Zinc, a mining company. After attending Marlborough College, where he became a member of council, Birkin went on to study law at University College London. He was a nationally-ranked squash player and played on the Junior England Squad.

In his spare time, Birkin pursues an interest in Renaissance art from the 13th, 14th, and 15th centuries.

== Career ==
=== Early career ===
In his early career, Birkin qualified as a Chartered Accountant, working for PricewaterhouseCoopers from 1981 to 1984. Later, he took a role as PA and protégé to Sir Mark Weinberg, chairman of Hambro Life Assurance, now Zurich Insurance Group. While handling the project to change the name of Hambro Life (to Allied Dunbar) he met John Murphy, the founder of Novamark and Interbrand who consulted on the project.

=== Interbrand ===
In 1987, Birkin joined executive chairman Murphy at the new Interbrand Group, where he began as group chief executive. He held this role at Interbrand from 1987 to 1995, during which time he took a leading role in developing the concept of brand valuation and became well known as an expert in the field. He was a contributor for the book Understanding Brands, published in 1991.

Under the leadership of Murphy and Birkin, Interbrand grew from an international company with 25 employees to a global marketing consultancy.

=== Omnicom ===
In December 1993, Omnicom Group's Diversified Agency Services (DAS) acquired Interbrand, and Birkin joined Omnicom. At Omnicom, he quickly rose up through the organisation, becoming European managing director of DAS in 1995, followed by international president of DAS in 1997, and worldwide president of DAS in 1999. In 2005, Birkin took on the role of president and CEO of Asia Pacific for Omnicom. His role in Asia was focused on helping Omnicom's agencies capitalise on potential opportunities in the region. In particular, he worked to promote Omnicom's services within Asia, which was the company's fastest-growing market in 2005.

Birkin's final roles at Omnicom were vice-chairman of Omnicom Group and CEO of Omnicom Asia-Pacific, which he held simultaneously. In 2009, he stepped down from both roles.

=== Red Peak Group and RPMC ===
Upon leaving Omnicom, Birkin acquired a 70% stake in RPMC, taking a majority position in the company. He then launched Red Peak Group, a global marketing services firm, in February 2010. RMPC became part of Red Peak Group, which also comprises Red Peak Branding.

Initially, Birkin fulfilled the role of chief strategist of Red Peak Group in addition to leading the company. He is chairman of Red Peak Group.

=== Acer ===
Birkin was hired as Taiwan-based Acer Inc.'s chief marketing officer in 2012. This was Birkin's first client-side position, helping the company shift its focus from manufacturing to marketing. Specifically, he joined the company to build Acer's marketing and brand building capabilities with the goal of using consumer insights to drive product development. While holding the role he retained his position as chairman of Red Peak. Birkin left Acer in May 2014.

=== kyu ===
In 2014, Birkin's Red Peak Group was acquired by advertising and marketing company Hakuhodo DY Holdings (ja), the second largest advertising company in Japan. Advertising Age ranks Hakuhodo DY Holdings among the world's top ten agency companies. Following the acquisition in 2014, Birkin was named CEO of kyu, a new endeavour Hakuhodo DY Holdings called a strategic operating group. In kyu's first year, Birkin acquired American company Digital Kitchen and Montreal's Sid Lee to form a global group of creative agencies with several specialisations. In April 2026, Birkin became Chair of kyu following the appointment of Rick Greenberg as CEO. To date the kyu collective includes ATÖYLE, BEworks, BIMM, C2, Digital Kitchen, Gehl, Ghost Note, Godfrey Dadich Partners, Haigo, IDEO, Kepler Group, Lexington, Napkyn, Public Digital, RedPeak, Rich Talent Group, Sid Lee, SYPartners, SYLVAIN, Upstatement, and Yard.
