= Cello scrotum =

Hoax medical condition

Cello scrotum is a hoax medical condition originally published as a brief case report in the British Medical Journal in 1974. As its name suggests, it was purportedly an affliction of the scrotum affecting male players of the cello.

== History ==
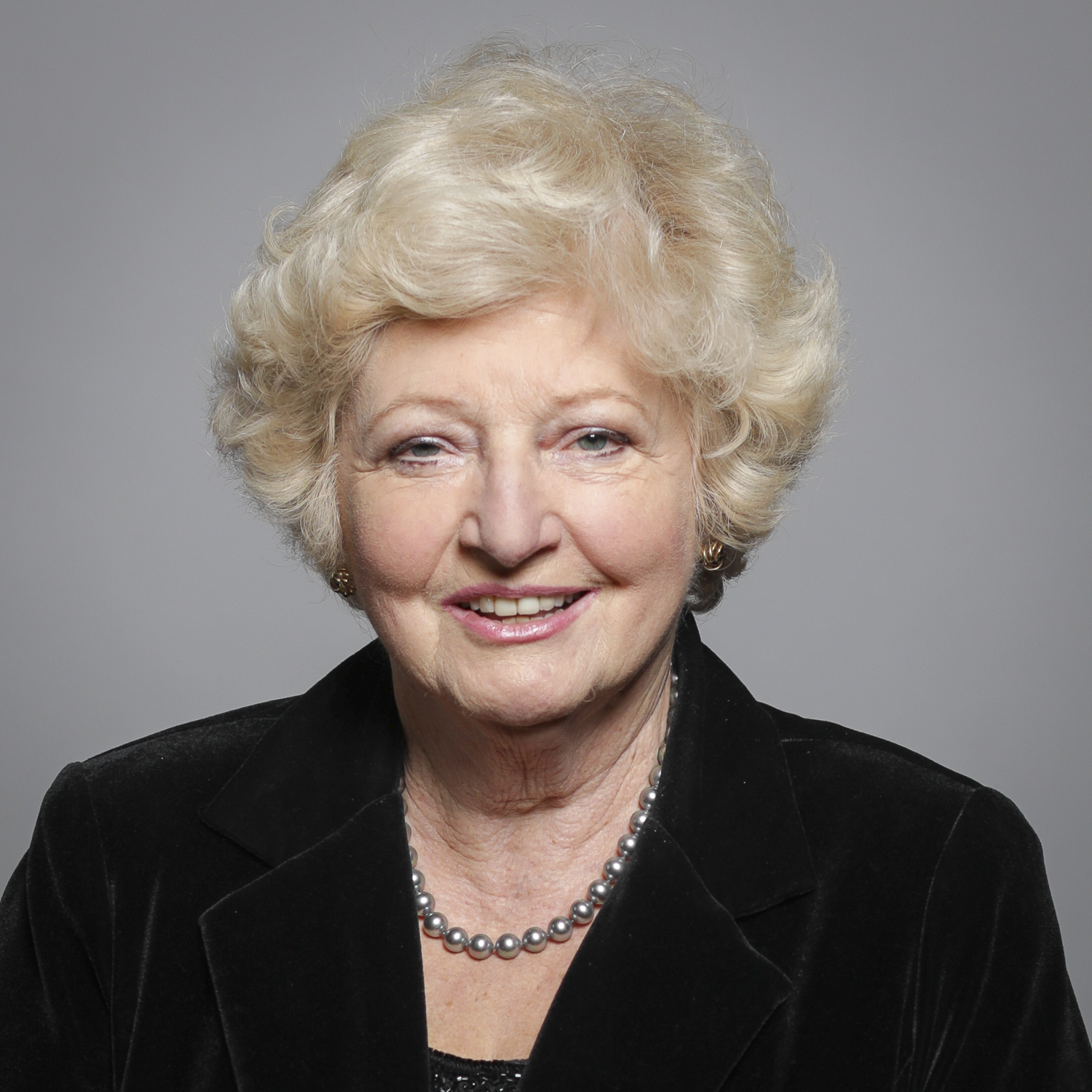
Baroness Murphy, originator of the cello scrotum hoax

The original letter was written by Elaine Murphy but signed by her husband John. The journal had printed an earlier report about 'guitar nipple', a condition said to occur when some styles of guitar playing excessively irritate the player's nipple (a form of contact dermatitis similar to jogger's nipple), which Murphy and her husband believed was likely a joke.

Murphy now points out that even a cursory study of the cellist's posture would show that the 'cello scrotum' complaint would not occur. The unlikelihood of a cellist's posture contributing to scrotal injury was raised back in 1974, but seems to have been overlooked.

Murphy admitted the hoax in 2009 in another letter to the BMJ after an article in the 2008 Christmas edition of the BMJ made reference to the complaint. The truth of the case report had already been questioned in the medical literature in 1991. Others have cited it, although expressing scepticism.

The implications of this and other hoax medical letters for evidence-based medicine and public understanding of science were discussed by Séamus Mac Suibhne.

== See also ==
- Coalworker's pneumoconiosis
- Golfer's elbow
- Jogger's nipple
- List of hoaxes
- Nintendo thumb
- Radium jaw
- Surfer's ear
- Tennis elbow
