= The Movielife discography =

Band discography

- Studio albums: 4
- EPs: 4
- Singles: 4
- Music videos: 4

The discography of The Movielife, an American rock band, consists of four studio albums, one live album, four extended plays and four singles.

== Studio albums ==
List of studio albums
Title	Album details
It's Go Time	Released: September 16, 1999; Label: Fadeaway (fadeaway 002); Format: CD, DL, LP
This Time Next Year	Released: October 31, 2000; Label: Revelation (REV:97); Format: CD, DL, LP
Forty Hour Train Back to Penn	Released: February 25, 2003; Label: Drive-Thru/MCA (DTR 37/440 060 092-2); Format: CD, DL, LP
Cities in Search of a Heart	Released: September 22, 2017; Label: Rise; Format: CD, DL, LP

== Live albums ==
List of live albums
Title	Album details
Live 9:30 Club 02/04/03	Released: February 10, 2004; Label: Digital Club Network (1020); Format: CD, DL

== Extended plays ==
List of extended plays
Title	Album details
Red Demo	Released: 1997; Label: Self-released; Format: CS
White Demo	Released: 1998; Label: Self-released; Format: CS
The Movielife/Ex Number Five (split EP with Ex Number Five)	Released: July 31, 2001; Label: One Day Savior (ODS006); Format: CD, 7" vinyl
The Movielife Has a Gambling Problem	Released: November 13, 2001; Label: Drive-Thru (DTR-26/422 860 974-2); Format: CD, DL, LP

== Singles ==
List of singles, showing year released and album name
Title	Year	Album	UK
"Self-Destruct"	2000	This Time Next Year	–
"Face or Kneecaps"	2003	Forty Hour Train Back to Penn	87
"Jamestown"	2003	Forty Hour Train Back to Penn	83
"Future Feeling (Afraid of Drugs)"	2015	Non-album single	–

== Videography ==
List of music videos, showing year released and director
Title	Year	Director
"Single White Female"	2000	Keith Scheifeld
"Walking on Glass"	2001	
"Face or Kneecaps"	2003	
"Jamestown"	2003	Digital Kitchen
