= Video game–related health problems =

Health problems related to video gaming

Game addiction problems can induce repetitive strain injuries, skin disorders or other health issues. Other problems include video game-provoked seizures in patients with epilepsy. In rare and extreme cases, deaths have resulted from excessive video game playing (see Deaths due to video game addiction).

== General findings ==
Since their inception, video games have been the subject of concern due to the depictions of violence they may contain, which have heightened as the technology behind video games improve the amount of visual detail and realism of games. Video games are often seen as a possible cause to violent actions, notably in the aftermath of the 1999 Columbine High School massacre, but academic studies have yet to identify any direct evidence between depictions of violence in video games and violent behavior.

According to a 2019 Sutter Health article, in "24 studies involving 17,000 children...", there was in fact a near-direct correlation between violent games and violent behavior. However, there are also reported upsides to gaming, such as an increased hand-eye coordination, and decision-making.

There may or may not be an accompanying video game addiction. Video games have also been linked in some studies to aggressive behavior and violence or fearful behavior by its players in the short term, although other studies have not supported this link.

Studies have mainly reported health problems in children, mainly boys. Several specific names have been given to video-game related health problems, for example PlayStation thumb, Nintendinitis and acute Wiiitis; however, the literature does not seem to support these as truly separate disease entities. Video game consoles linked to medical problems include the PlayStation and the Nintendo Wii, although it is unknown whether certain types are more connected to these problems than others. Physical signs linked to excessive video game playing include black rings in the skin under the eyes and muscular stiffness in the shoulders, possibly caused by a tense posture or sleep deprivation.

Existing literature on gaming is inconsistent, and studies occasionally produce contradictory results. Some studies show strong correlations between gaming and psychological issues, such as increased aggression in males and increased depression in females. Another study claims that girls who gamed were less likely to experience depression, but were more likely to get into fights. Synthesizing studies covering the COVID-19 period, a meta-analysis reported no overall association between time spent gaming and mental-health measures.

In 2009, during a speech to the American Medical Association, US President Barack Obama identified video games as a health concern, stating that they are a key factor in unhealthy sedentary lifestyles.

== Musculoskeletal issues ==
When questioned, children often admit to having physical complaints during too much video game playing, for example pain in the hands and wrists, back and neck. Ergonomic measures could improve postural problems associated with video game playing.

A 2004 case report in The Lancet, authored by a 9-year-old boy, mentions the Playstation thumb, which features numbness and a blister caused by friction between the thumb and the controller from rapid game play. Using dermoscopy, dermatologists found point-like hemorrhages and onycholysis (letting go of the nail) in a patient who presented with hyperkeratosis.

Nintendonitis has been used to describe tendon injuries (tendinosis) of the hands and wrists in Nintendo players.

A 2010 case report in the New England Journal of Medicine reported a fracture of the base of the fifth metatarsal after using a Wii balanceboard; this was dubbed a Wii fracture.

A further study involving musculoskeletal symptoms and computer use among Finnish adolescents affirmed the association between musculoskeletal symptoms and computer usage. The study claims that daily computer use of 2 hours or more increases the risk for pain at most anatomic sites.

Consistently long sessions of video game play also leads to an increased likelihood of lower back pain, according to a study conducted in a population of school children. Children who played video games for more than 2 hours a day were more inclined to have lower back pain; however, the same could not be said for those who watched television instead.

== Vision problems ==
Too much video game playing may cause vision problems. Extensive viewing of the screen can cause eye strain, as the cornea, pupil, and iris are not intended for mass viewing sessions of electronic devices. Using video games for too long may also cause headaches, dizziness, and chances of vomiting from focusing on a screen. However, playing video games can also help eyesight because it increases reaction speeds and thought times.

Certain studies have shown that video games can be used to improve various eye conditions. An investigation into the effect of action gaming on spatial distribution of attention was conducted and revealed that gamers exhibited an enhancement with attention resources compared to non-gamers, not only in the periphery but also in central vision. Further studies in 2011 concluded that a combination of video game therapy alongside occlusion therapy, would greatly improve the recovery of visual acuity in those experiencing amblyopia.

== Epileptic seizures ==
Concerns that video games can trigger epileptic seizures began in the early 1980s, with the first medically documented case of a video game-induced seizure occurring in 1981. In early 1993, The Sun reported a boy choked to death on his own vomit during a seizure triggered by playing a video game; similar though less serious incidents were subsequently reported by news media around the world, and within a year all video game console manufacturers required that epilepsy warnings be included in the instruction manuals for all games published for their consoles.

Studies published in 1994 in Pediatrics and The Lancet found that video games only cause seizures in people already predisposed to epilepsy, and that people with a predisposition to epilepsy can greatly reduce the risk of a seizure by staying 10 feet or more away from the TV set and wearing sunglasses while playing.

== Obesity ==
Video game play is frequently associated with obesity. Many studies have been conducted on the link between television & video games and increased BMI (Body Mass Index). Due to video games replacing physical activities, there appears to be a clear association between time spent playing video games and increased BMI in young children. One such study produced data that indicated that boys who spend less than 1.5 hours on the television and playing video games, were 75.4% less likely to be overweight than those who spend more than 1.5 hours.

A study conducted in 2011 formalized the association of video game play and an increase in food intake in teens. A single session of video game play resulted in an increase in food intake, regardless of appetite. The recent trend of "active video games" revolving around the Wii and Xbox Kinect might be a way to help combat the aforementioned problem, however, this finding still needs confirmation from other studies. Furthermore, a study conducted in Baylor College of Medicine revolving around children claims that there is no evidence which supports the belief that acquiring an active video game under naturalistic circumstances would result in a beneficial outcome toward children. The study produced no results showing an increased amount of physical activity within the children receiving the active video games. It has been estimated that children in the United States are spending 25 percent of their waking hours watching television and playing video games. Statistically, the children who watch the most hours of television or play video games are shown to have the highest incidence of obesity.

== Noise-induced hearing loss ==
A 2024 systematic review of 14 studies investigating associations between sound-induced hearing loss and playing video games and esports found that there was a significant association between gaming and hearing loss or tinnitus, and that the average measured sound levels during gameplay by subjects (which averaged 3 hours per week) exceeded or nearly exceeded permissible sound exposure levels.
