= Curious Brewing =

Brewery in Ashford, Kent

Coordinates: 51°08′38″N 00°52′21″E

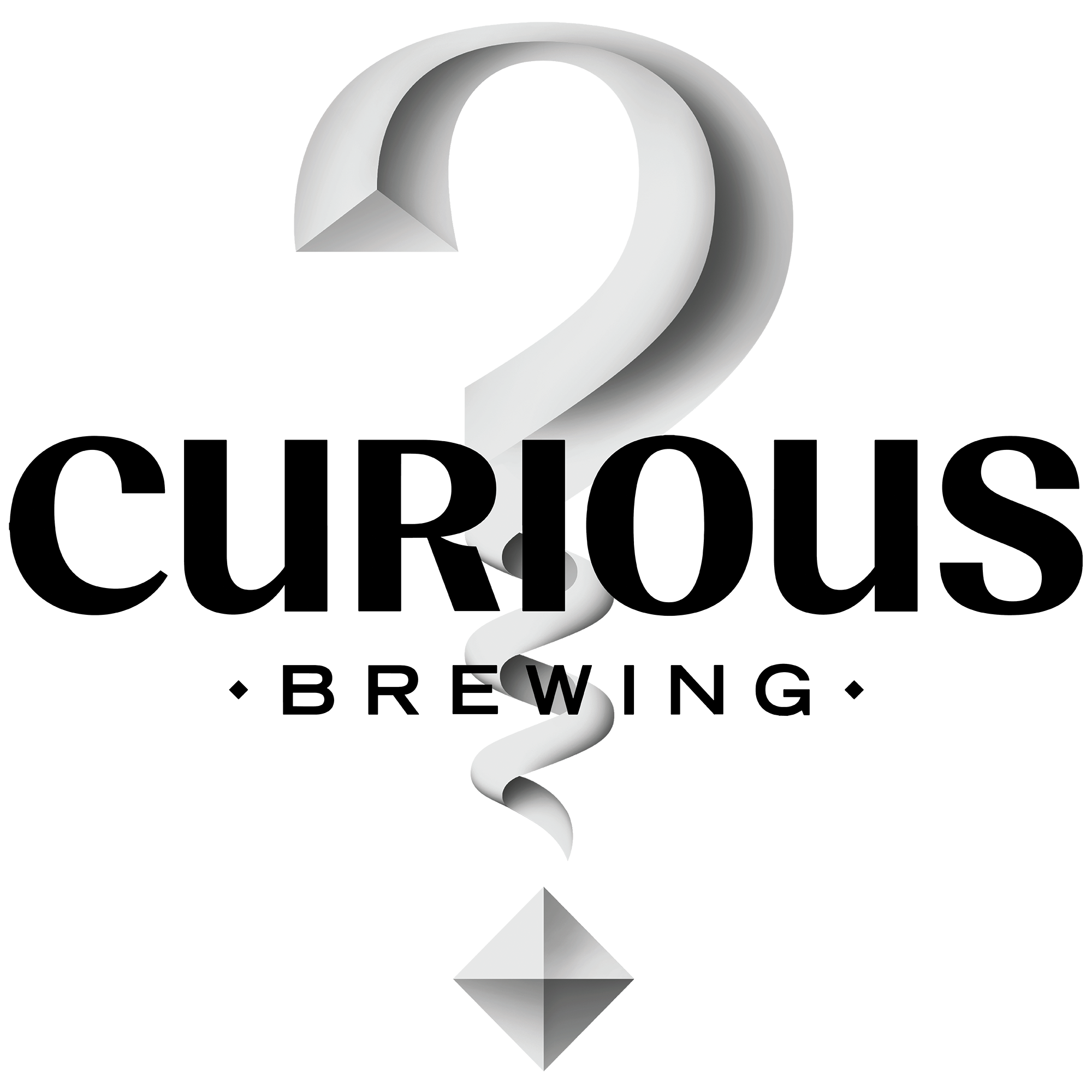
- Headquarters: Ashford, Kent
- Key people: Matthew Anderson (Head brewer)
- Parent: St. Peter's Brewery
- Website: curiousbrewery.com

Curious Brewing (formerly Curious Brewery) is a brewery in Ashford, Kent, England. It was established in 2011 by the Kent-based winery group Chapel Down.

== History ==
Chapel Down had started producing lagers in 2010, importing beer and ales from the Leicester-based brewery Everards, but wanted to open a local production unit. The brewery was given permission to develop from the town council in late 2016. The site was purchased for development in November 2017 following a £1.7 million investment, mostly from crowdfunding.

The company chose to invest in Ashford because of its prominent location on the High Speed 1 railway. The brewery own a bar inside St Pancras railway station, London, at the other end of the line. The premises were planned to be fully open in April 2019 with a production capacity of two million litres (440,000 imp gal), with an accompanying restaurant and visitors centre. The people who donated to the crowdfunding scheme, which raised £1.16 million of the funds, receive a discount on products, with those contributing over £25,000 having their names engraved on one of the fermentation tanks. A waterfall was constructed on one side of the premises.

In March 2019, the brewery announced that the new premises would not be fully open until the end of May owing to a problem with the groundwork. Once open, production in Ashford would quadruple from the existing capacity, catering for up to 170,000 imperial pints (97,000 L) of beer at any one time. It opened on 10 May.

In February 2021, following a catastrophic loss in trade following the COVID-19 pandemic, Chapel Down put the brewery business in administration. It was subsequently sold to Luke Johnson's Risk Capital Partners, who stressed there would be no redundancies.

In January 2023, it was announced that Curious Brewing had acquired Wild Beer Co, based in Shepton Mallet, Dorset. Wild Beer Co had previously revealed their planned closure due to waning finances and challenges connected with rising costs.

On 29 September 2023, Curious Brewing was bought by St. Peter's Brewery based in Suffolk.

== Brewery ==
The brewery in Ashford

The brewery is located on a 1.6-acre (0.65 ha) former brownfield site on Victoria Road, near Ashford International station. The ground floor includes 1,000 square feet (93 m^{2}) of publicly-accessible areas including a shop and bar. Elsewhere, there is a 4,000 square feet (370 m^{2}) bar with two dining rooms. A waterfall is installed down a side of the building. The premises is on a brownfield site that previously housed the Beaver Road School, which was demolished by a bomb during World War II on 24 March 1943. The brewhouse is named "Miss Adams", in honour of the school's head teacher who managed to evacuate all children immediately before the blast.

== Product range ==
The company produces a variety of beers and lagers, using winemaking methods. These include Curious Brew and Curious IPA. As well as draught products, the group produces Curious Session IPA in cans, which was launched on Beer Can Appreciation Day, 2019. At 4.4% alcohol by volume (ABV), it replaced the stronger Curious IPA at 5.6% ABV.

The brewery won the 2021 UK Brewer of the Year at the International Beer Challenge, after being judged the best brewer by an expert panel of 70.

A special selection of "Curiouser and Curiouser" beers has been introduced. The name comes from the novel Alice's Adventures in Wonderland where Alice said that things were getting "curiouser and curiouser".
