= Brand valuation =

Marketing measurement

Brand valuation is the process of estimating the total financial value of a brand. A conflict of interest exists if those who value a brand were also involved in its creation. The ISO 10668 standard specifies six key requirements for the process of valuing brands, which are transparency, validity, reliability, sufficiency, objectivity; and financial, behavioral, and legal parameters.

Brand valuation is distinct from brand equity.

== Brand value ==
Traditional marketing methods examine the price/value relationship in terms of dollars paid. Some marketers believe customers perceive the value to mean the lowest price. While this may be true for standardized commercial products, some branding techniques are moving beyond this evaluation.

Brand valuation emerged in the 1980s. Early pioneers in brand valuations included the British branding agency, Interbrand, led by John Murphy and Michael Birkin, which is credited with leading the concept's development. Millward Brown was also a leading brand valuer.

Both companies maintained "Top 100" lists of companies by valuation. In 1989, Murphy edited a seminal work on the subject: Brand Valuation – Establishing a true and fair view; and in 1991, Birkin laid out a brand earnings multiple models of brand valuation in the book, Understanding Brands. A 2009 paper identified "at least 52" brand valuation companies.

== Valuation methodologies ==
There are three main types of brand valuation methods:

=== The cost approach ===
This is based on the cost of creating the brand. The fundamental premise of the cost approach is that it should not be worth more than it would cost to build an equivalent. The cost of building a brand minus any expenses is reflective of market value.

=== The market approach ===
In this approach, the market price is compared. This valuation method relies on the estimation of value based on similar market transactions (e.g. similar license agreements) of comparable brand rights. Given that often the asset undervaluation is unique, the comparison is performed in terms of utility, technological specificity and property, considering the asset's perception by the market. Since the market approach relies on comparisons to similar assets, it is most useful when there is substantial data available regarding recent sales of comparable assets. Data on comparable or similar transactions may be accessed through the following sources:

1. Company annual reports.
2. Specialized royalty rate databases and publications.
3. Court decisions concerning damages.

=== The income approach ===
This approach measures the value by reference to the present value of the economic benefits received over the rest of the useful life of the brand. There are at least six recognized methods of the income approach, with some authorities listing more.

1. Price premium method – estimates the value of a brand by the price premium it generates when compared to a similar but unbranded product or service. This must take into account the volume premium method.
2. Volume premium method – estimates the value of a brand by the volume premium it generates when compared to a similar but unbranded product or service. This must take into account the price premium method.
3. Income split method – this values the brand as the present value portion of the economic profit attributable to the brand over the rest of its useful life. This has problems in that profits can sometimes be negative, leading to unrealistic brand value, and also that profits can be manipulated so may misrepresent brand value. This method uses qualitative measures to decide the portion of economic profits to be accredited to the brand.
4. Multi-period excess earnings method – this method requires a valuation of each group of intangible assets to calculate the cost of capital of each. The returns for each of these are deducted from the present value of future cash flows and when all other assets have been accounted for, the remaining is used as the value of the brand.
5. Incremental cash flow method or Excess Margin – Identifies the extra cash flow in a branded business when compared to an unbranded, and comparable, business. However, it is rare to find conditions for this method to be used since finding similar unbranded companies can be difficult.
6. Royalty relief method – Assume theoretically a company does not own the brand it operates under but instead licenses the use from another. The royalty relief method uses available data of similar arrangements in the industry and assigns the value of the brand as the present value of future royalty payments.

== Uses of brand valuation ==
Common purposes are:

- Value reporting
- Business buying and selling decisions
- Tracking shareholders' value
- Licensing
- Dispute resolution
- Legal transactions
- Accounting
- Strategic planning
- Management information
- Taxation planning and compliance
- Liquidation
- Litigation support
- Investor's presentation / Shareholder's report
- Raising funds
- The ability to summon resources quickly in a systemic breakdown or apocalypse

Interbrand classifies these uses of brand valuation in three categories:

1. Financial applications (e.g. mergers and acquisitions, balance sheet valuation, investor relations)
2. Brand management applications (e.g. brand portfolio management, resource allocation)
3. Strategic / Business case applications (e.g. brand architecture, brand repositioning)

== Criticism ==
One research paper states that "many of the methodologies [of brand valuation] used in practice are not theoretically sound". One critic, Mark Ritson, writing in Marketing Week in 2015, said he had previously suggested that "despite the power and prestige of big valuation firms Interbrand, Millward Brown and Brand Finance, there was a possibility that much of what they do was bollocks". He reported on research which found variation between brand valuations: "The average valuation was as likely to overstate a brand's value by more than 500% than it was to get within 20% of the actual price paid".

== Future developments ==
It has been suggested by Tony Juniper that factoring the effects companies have on the environment into brand valuation may support better understanding and addressing of environmental risks.

== See also ==
- List of most valuable brands
- Brand equity
