= John Murphy (branding consultant) =

British branding consultant, born 1946

John Matthew Murphy (born 1944, Essex) is a British marketing consultant who first described the process of branding. He also pioneered the art of brand valuation, that is, measuring the accounting value of a company's brands as assets, and in so doing, he stimulated the development of branding as an aspect of business. Murphy founded Interbrand, the world’s first branding consultancy, and named many familiar brands.

== Interbrand and brand valuation ==
In London in 1974, Murphy launched Novamark, a small company specialising in product naming and in trade mark registrations. In the 1970s, the scope of Novamark's consulting work expanded to encompass brand design and strategy. In 1979, when Murphy opened his first overseas office in New York, he adopted the name Interbrand. Among the concepts that Interbrand developed in the 1980s was brand valuation. As Murphy later explained, there was "a huge buying and selling of branded-goods businesses where what was essentially being bought and sold was brands. But nobody knew how to value brands."

In 1987, Interbrand announced that it had developed a proprietary methodology for brand evaluation and in 1989 Murphy edited a work on the subject: Brand Valuation – Establishing a true and fair view. In 1993, Murphy decided to sell Interbrand, which by then had a headcount of 600 and a burgeoning international practice, to Omnicom. He stayed on at Omnicom as Interbrand's chairperson till 1996 to help with the transition.

Brand names born out of Murphy's efforts during this time include:

- HobNobs, a biscuit
- Homebase, a chain of home improvement stores and garden centres
- Prozac, an antidepressant drug
- Zeneca, a pharmaceutical company
- Discovery, a sport utility vehicle
- Kaliber, a low-alcohol lager
- Gala Bingo, a chain of bingo clubs

== Suffolk beer and Plymouth gin ==
After Interbrand, Murphy turned his hand to building brands himself. Looking at how English brewers struggled to market themselves abroad due to their reliance on marketing through local pubs, he decided to try the opposite, and base a brewery around brand projection. In 1996, Murphy established St. Peter's, a small artisan brewery in Bungay, Suffolk, from scratch, without a substantial chain of controlled pub outlets, marketing it both locally and internationally. He sold it in 2018.

Murphy also led the acquisition from Allied Domecq of the Plymouth Gin distillery and brand in 1996 by a small group of investors, betting on the history of the drink as the basis of the pink gin in Britain and a prohibition era-beating product in the US. At the time of acquisition, the distillery was producing some 3,000 cases of gin a year, but had capacity to make 200,000. After Murphy's repackaging and PR campaign, sales had increased to 150,000 cases by 2003.

== Honours ==
Brunel University awarded Murphy an honorary doctorate in 2001. He has been a visiting professor at Birmingham and The Open University Business Schools.

== "Cello scrotum" ==
Murphy was the signatory of a spoof letter (written with his wife at the time, Dr Elaine Murphy) about a "Cello scrotum" condition that the British Medical Journal (now The BMJ) published in 1974.

== Publications ==
- John Murphy, Michael Rowe. How to design trademarks and logos. — North Light Books, 1988.
- John Murphy. Brand Valuation – Establishing a true and fair view. — London: Hutchinson Business Books, 1989. — ISBN 0-09-174261-7.
- John Murphy. Brand Strategy. — 1990. — ISBN 0130841617.
- Susannah Hart, John Murphy (editors). Brands – The new wealth creators. Basingstoke: Macmillan, 1998 — ISBN 9780333659090
- John Murphy. Brandfather: the man who invented branding. — 2017. — ISBN 9781911320357.
