= Chapel Down =

English winemaker

Coordinates: 51°02′28″N 0°41′53″E

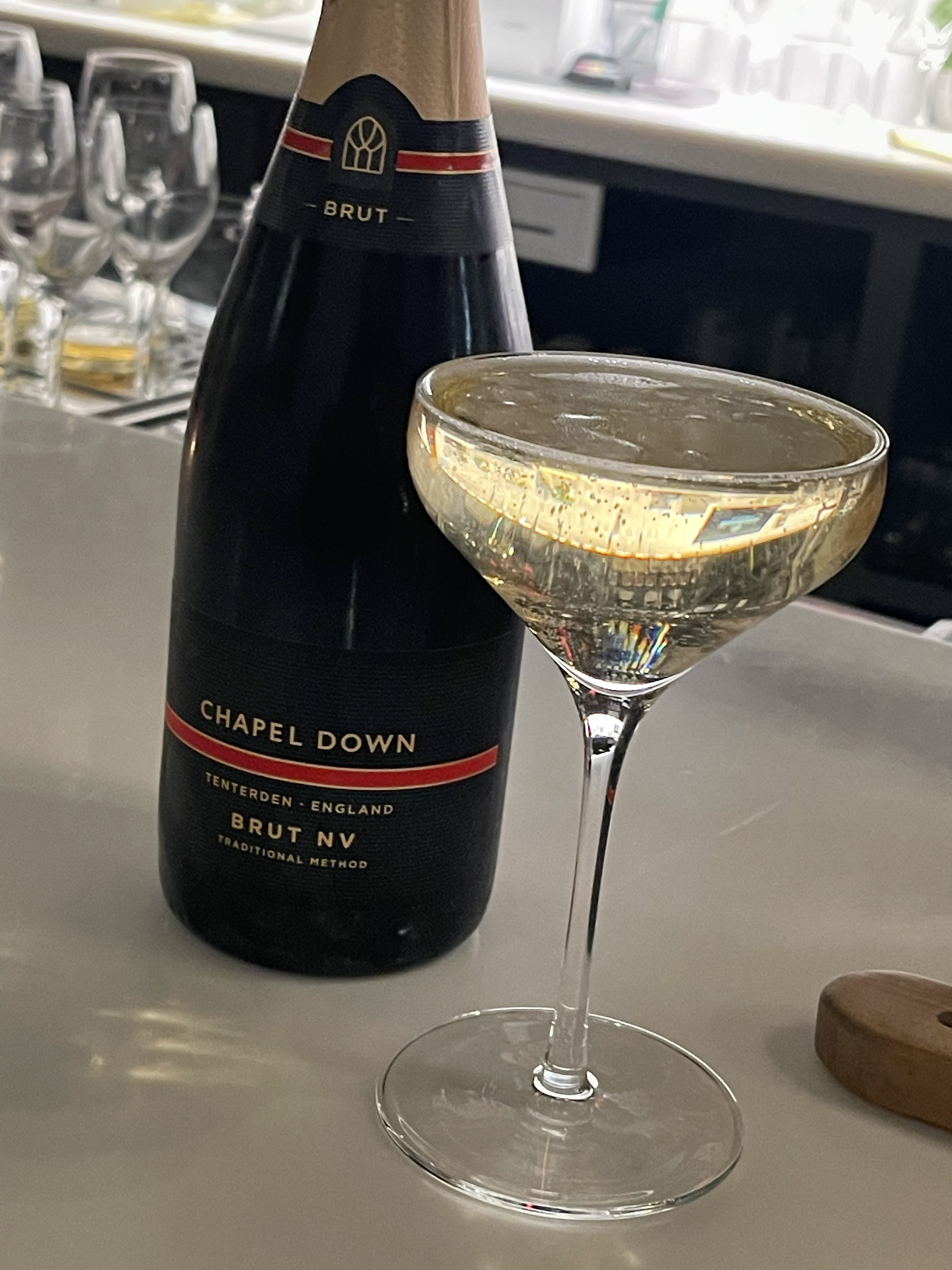
Chapel Down Brut served at Sausage Emporium in Sonoma, California.

Chapel Down based in Tenterden in Kent, is an English vineyard and winemaker. It is the largest producer of English wine, with over 950 acres under vine, which will reach a capacity of 2.4 million bottles per annum.

== Wines ==
Chapel Down predominantly produces sparkling wines using the traditional method, although it also makes still wines.

== History ==
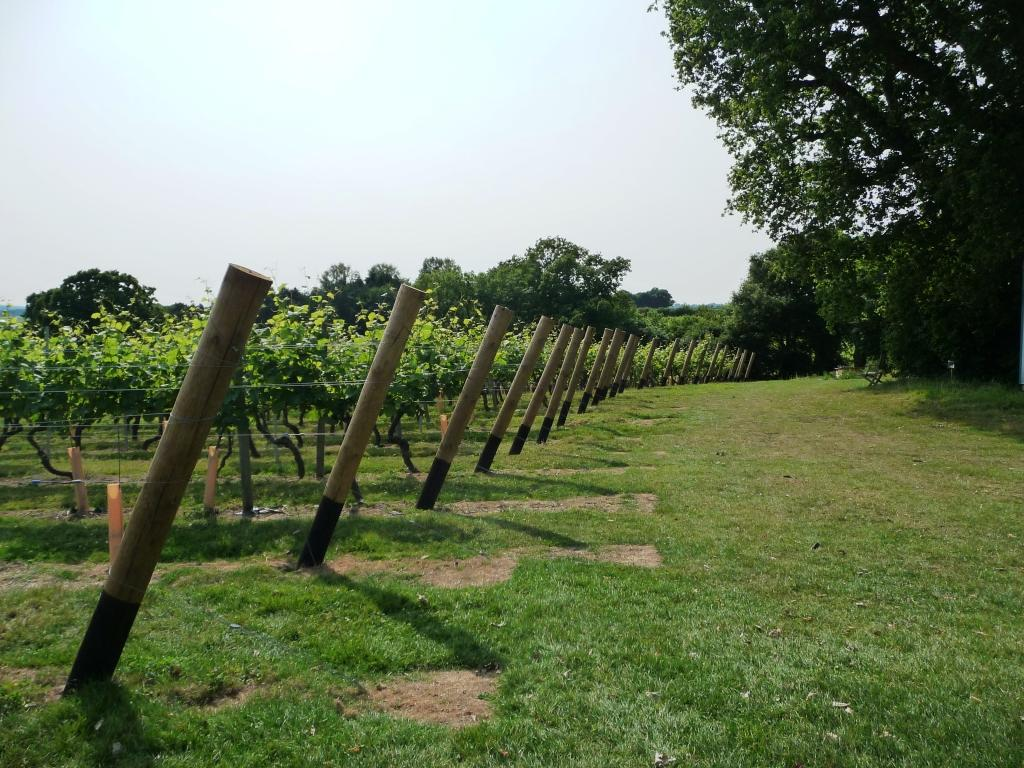
Vineyard near Tenterden.

In 2011, Chapel Down established Curious Brewing (formerly Curious Brewery) in Ashford, Kent. The brewery was given permission to develop from the town council in late 2016. The site was purchased for development in November 2017 following a £1.7 million investment, mostly from crowdfunding. In February 2021, following a catastrophic loss in trade following the COVID-19 pandemic, Chapel Down put the brewery business in administration. It was subsequently sold to Risk Capital Partners.

In October 2018, Chapel Down announced a bar and restaurant in Kings Cross, London Station, Gin Works, would open, focusing on Chapel Down spirits. It subsequently opened in January 2019. It closed just a year later in February 2020, due to poor footfall, despite receiving good reviews from patrons.

== Awards ==
The Rosé Brut won a Platinum award in the 2021 Decanter World Wine Awards.

== Management change ==
Former CEO Frazer Thompson retired in November 2021 after 20 years and has been replaced by Andrew Carter.

== Crowdfunding campaign ==
In 2021 the company started a crowdfunding campaign for up to £7m, to help the business expand its vineyard and ramp up exports.
