= St. Peter's Brewery =

Brewery in Bungay, England

St. Peter's Brewery Co. Ltd.

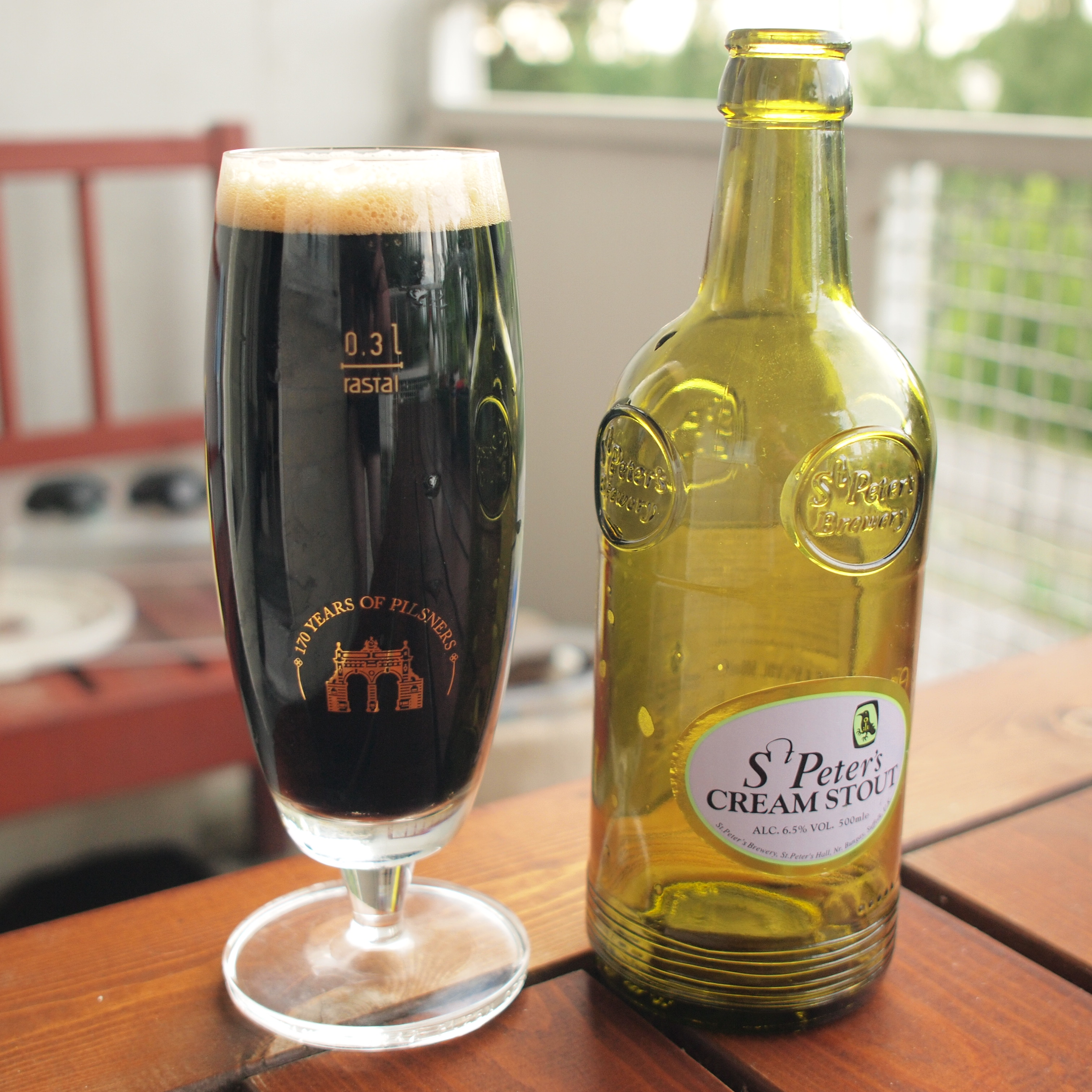
- St. Peter's Cream Stout
- Type: alcoholic beverage
- Location: St Peter, South Elmham, Bungay, Suffolk, England
- Opened: 1996
- Key people: John Murphy (founder) Derek Jones (CEO)
- Website: Official website

St. Peter's is an independent brewery founded in 1996 by John Murphy in former agricultural buildings adjacent to St. Peter's Hall in St Peter, South Elmham, near Bungay in the English county of Suffolk. In 2021, St Peter's was sold to independent investors, including the current CEO, Derek Jones, who has since expanded and modernised the brewery while still making the same beers.

The brewery produces cask ale but is best known for its cold-filtered bottled beers, the most popular of which are Pale Ale, Cream Stout, and 0.0% Without.

In September 2023, the business acquired Curious Brewing and its subsidiary Wild Beer. The expanded group now produces a range of craft ales, lagers, and unique brews.

== The beers ==
The brewery produces around twelve regular beers plus another six seasonal. St Peter's is known for its organic beers. A gluten-free beer, G-Free TM was launched late in 2007 and is approved and licensed by Coeliac UK.

The oval shape of its signature 500 ml bottle is based on an 18th-century gin bottle from Gibbstown, by the Delaware River near Philadelphia, but a round version is also common.

== Awards ==
- European Beer Challenge 2025: Cream Stout won Double Gold; Plum Porter, Old Style Porter and Golden Ale all won Gold
- World Beer Awards 2024: Cream Stout, Plum Porter and Without® Original all awarded Silver; Golden Ale and Old Style Porter awarded Bronze
- World Alcohol Free Awards 2024: Without® Original won Silver, Without® Gold won Bronze. This competition attracted 450 entries from 21 countries
- European Beer Challenge 2024: Cream Stout awarded Double Gold, Golden Ale and Old Style Porter both won Gold
