= Digital Kitchen =

- Founded: 1995
- Key people: Paul Matthaeus - Chairman & Founder, Don McNeill - CEO & Co-Founder, Bill Fritsch - Vice Chairman, Anthony Vitagliano - President & Chief Creative Officer, Kim Clarke - Chief Financial Officer, Cynthia Biamon - Managing Director (Los Angeles), Thierry Anglade - Managing Director (Seattle)
- Products: Advertising/Marketing
- Website: www.thisisdk.com

Digital Kitchen is a marketing company with offices in Seattle, Washington, Chicago, Illinois, New York, New York, and Los Angeles, California, United States. Founded in 1995, the agency is a collective of artists and producers that focus on transforming businesses through creative experiences. Much of Digital Kitchen's work included design, motion graphics and film within the commercial, network and entertainment industries. The agency has been recognized for its main title works: True Blood, Dexter, Six Feet Under and Nip/Tuck. Digital Kitchen works as a full-service creative agency for clients such as HBO, AT&T U-verse, Target, Levi Strauss, Microsoft, Sierra Nevada Brewing Company and The Movielife.

In 2003, music managers Richard And Stefanie Reines of Drive-Thru Records, hired the company to direct the music video for The Movielife's hit single Jamestown, set up by the major labels. The band was shot in a green screen and then DK designed the cgi backgrounds and setting.

In October 2014, Digital Kitchen merged with Seattle-based communications design firm Methodologie. On June 2, 2015 Digital Kitchen was acquired by kyu, the strategic operating unit of Hakuhodo DY Holdings, which is currently headed by CEO Michael Birkin.

In October 2019 DK partnered with kyu sister company Sid Lee and operate jointly in their LA office located in Culver City.

== Notable Campaigns ==
- Sierra Nevada Brewing Company "Brand Story"
- Stanley Piano "World's First Interactive Player Piano"
- Cosmopolitan of Las Vegas Digital Experience
- True Blood Season 2 "Hacked Reality"
- Big Love "A Juniper Creek Christmas"
- Levi's "Unbuttoned"

== Awards ==
- 2002 Emmy "Outstanding Main Title Design" for Six Feet Under
- 2007 Emmy "Outstanding Main Title Design" for Dexter
- 2009 Art Directors Club Award "Television and Cinema Design" for Seattle International Film Festival Trailer
- 2010 Webby Award "Peoples Choice" True Blood Season 2
- 2011 The One Show "Design Gold Pencil" for Cosmopolitan of Las Vegas Digital Experience
- 2011 Cannes Lions International Advertising Festival "Design Grand Prix" for Cosmopolitan of Las Vegas Digital Experience
