= Nintendo thumb =

Injury caused by video games

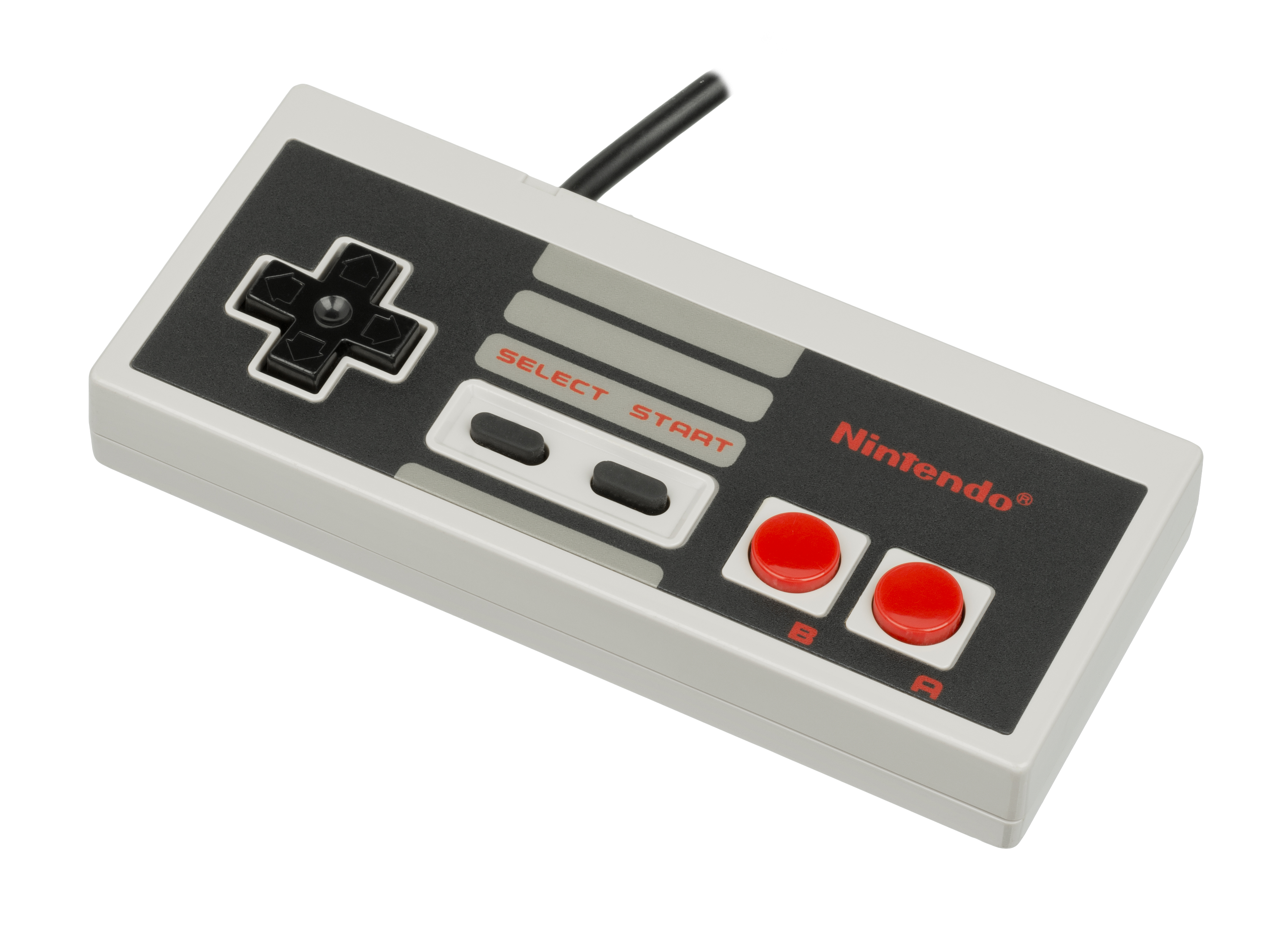
Original Nintendo Entertainment System controller, which caused first cases of Nintendo thumb injury

Nintendo thumb, also known as gamer's thumb and similar names, is a form of repetitive strain injury (RSI) caused by excessive playing of video games with the traditional Nintendo controller. This injury mainly occurs due to repeated thumb movements while playing video games. The symptoms can include blistering, paraesthesia (a tingling or a burning feeling in the skin), as well as swelling of the thumbs, though any finger can be affected. This can lead to stress on tendons, nerves, and ligaments in the hands, and further onto lateral epicondylitis ("tennis elbow"), tendinitis (severe swelling of the tendon), bursitis (inflammation of the fluid-filled sac around joints), and carpal tunnel syndrome (compression of the median nerve at the wrist). Similar injuries can occur with other gaming systems, such as PlayStation thumb from playing Sony PlayStation. The general recommendation for the treatment is to rest and stop the repetitive motion of the affected finger (usually the thumb). In more severe and painful cases, using NSAIDs is also recommended.

Other less localized injuries in the shoulder, knee, and Achilles tendon have also been noted to arise from playing the Nintendo Wii. Some of the symptoms can be associated with the De Quervain syndrome (degeneration of tendons that control the movement of the thumb).

== Background ==
Few case reports of symptoms including stiff and painful joints and limited range of motion in the wrist after frequent Atari 2600 use were published in the late 1970s and early 1980s. Nintendo thumb specifically was first highlighted after portable handheld Nintendo games consoles were released in 1989, with reported cases of RSI appearing primarily in children. Later, the controllers for the Sony PlayStation and PlayStation 2 were noted as causing the condition.

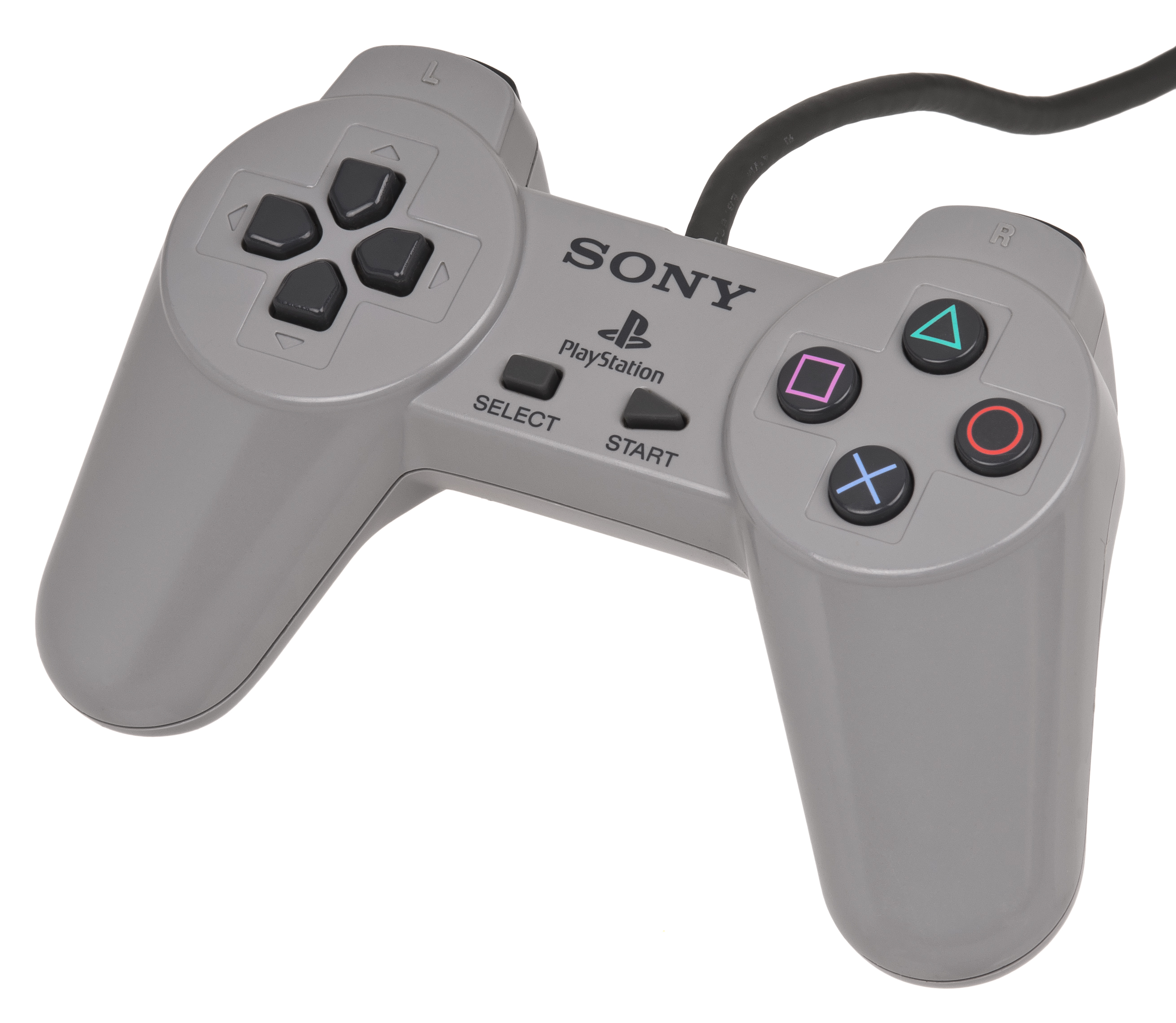
The repetitive motion of the thumb or other fingers on Sony PlayStation controllers can cause the same type of injury as Nintendo thumb.

In 1987, an 11-year-old boy reported to the Children's Hospital of Philadelphia complaining of his finger being contracted, flexed, and being unable to relax it back to its baseline position. After medical investigation it was determined that this same finger was being used to use the joystick of his video game remote (no mention of the brand) up to around 6 continuous hours on a daily basis. All other fingers that did not use the joystick did not witness this injury, and a general approach of anti-inflammatories and eliminating playing time was used to treat this individual.

The first occurrence of the Nintendo thumb condition was published on May 17, 1990, when a 35-year-old woman played a Nintendo video game for the first time. She played it for five hours with no interruptions. The next day, she experienced severe pain in the right thumb (specifically in the extensor tendon), which she had used to press a button on the video game console repeatedly.

In January 1991, the condition was termed as "Nintendinitis" by James Casanova, MD, when he evaluated an 8-year-old boy with pain in his thumb. It was found that the pain occurred when the boy flexed his thumb while playing a Nintendo video game, and that he had no history of trauma or disease.

A similar effect was seen in adults using alternative controllers such as the Nintendo Wii Remote Controller. However, due to the shape, size, and extended use of game controllers, it can occur in users of any gamepad or joystick. Similar problems have also been observed with the use of mobile phones and text messaging in particular, called texter's thumb (see Blackberry thumb).

Reports of nintendinitis resurfaced after the Nintendo 64 console came to market in 1997, which contained a joystick that caused similar injuries in the palm named "ulcerative nintendinitis".

== Treatment and prevention ==
It is known that movements that are both high in acceleration and in force can lead to injury if performed repeatedly, and this applies to both larger limbs such as legs and arms, as well as smaller ones such as wrist and fingers. Evidence based guidelines for wise use of e-games by children suggest prevention of musculoskeletal injuries via minimization of usage of e-games that require movements that can lead to RSI while at the same time being mindful of the physical position the player is in while engaged in video games. Additionally, preventative measures can include flexion and extension stretches in the wrist at warm-up and throughout gameplay. These examples of preventative approaches become particularly important since evidence shows that increased video game playing time will increase the risk of developing these conditions. In early 2000, Nintendo of America provided protective gloves for its users after receiving 90 case-reports regarding hand injuries. Nintendo now also provides messages during gameplay to remind players to take a break.

The pain and discomfort resulted from this injury is usually temporary, and the recommended treatment includes holding back on playing video games for several days. The few published case reports of Nintendo thumb did note that symptoms resolved upon stopping video game use. Using nonsteroidal anti-inflammatory drugs like Ibuprofen to relieve the inflammation from the RSI is another treatment option.

== Other related injuries ==
=== Case reports ===
Although overall video game consoles and remote controllers have moved towards a more ergonomic approach, Nintendo has faced an increase in injuries with their consoles caused by the Nintendo Wii. This is because of its novel style of play which involves more physical and interactive activity on behalf of the user. After the release of this console in 2006, the first case report belongs to an Achilles heel injury presented by a 46-year-old man after playing performing a jogging motion requested by the game which led to the rupture of his Achilles tendon.

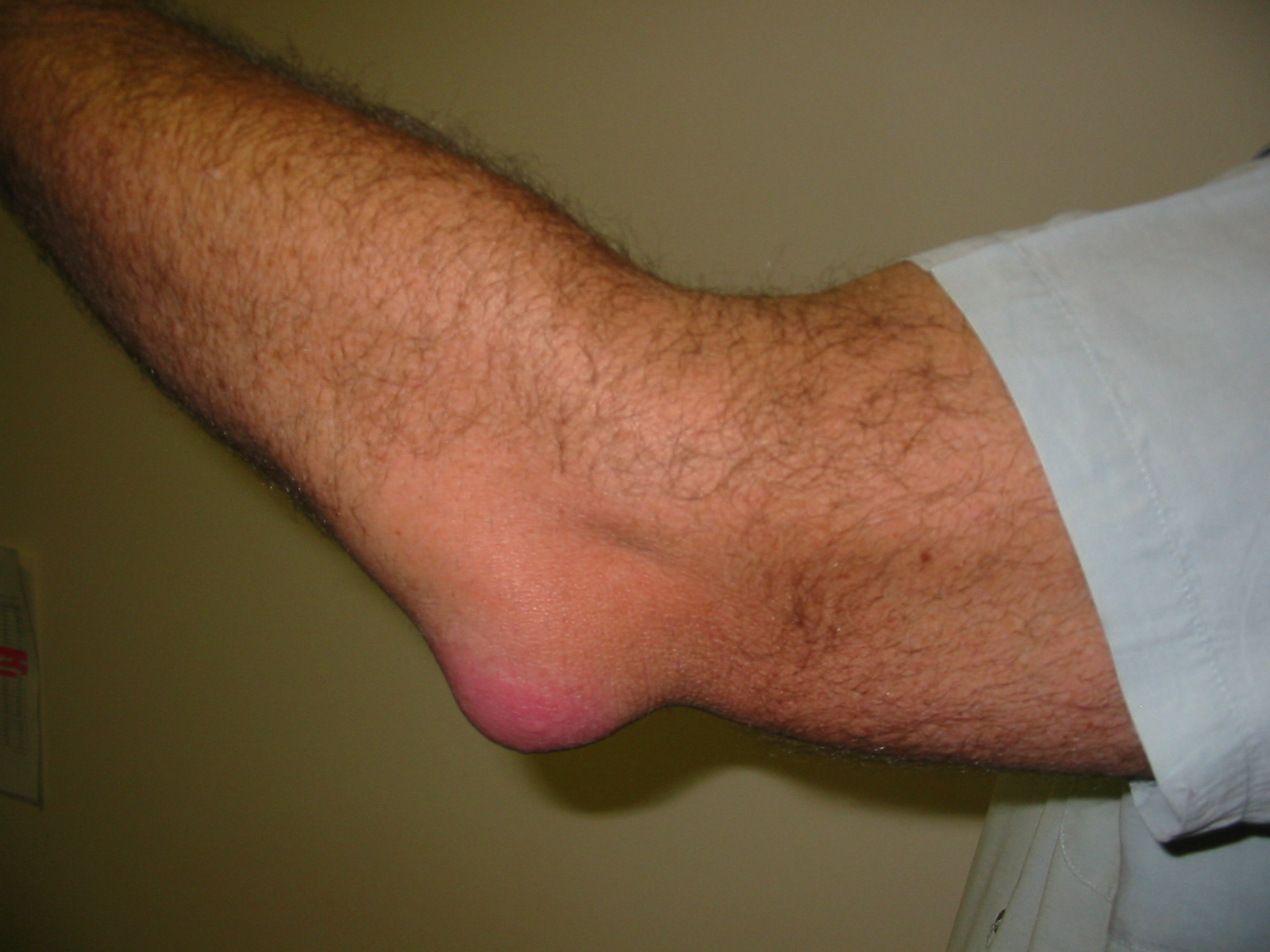
Bursitis in elbow is a common Wii related injury.

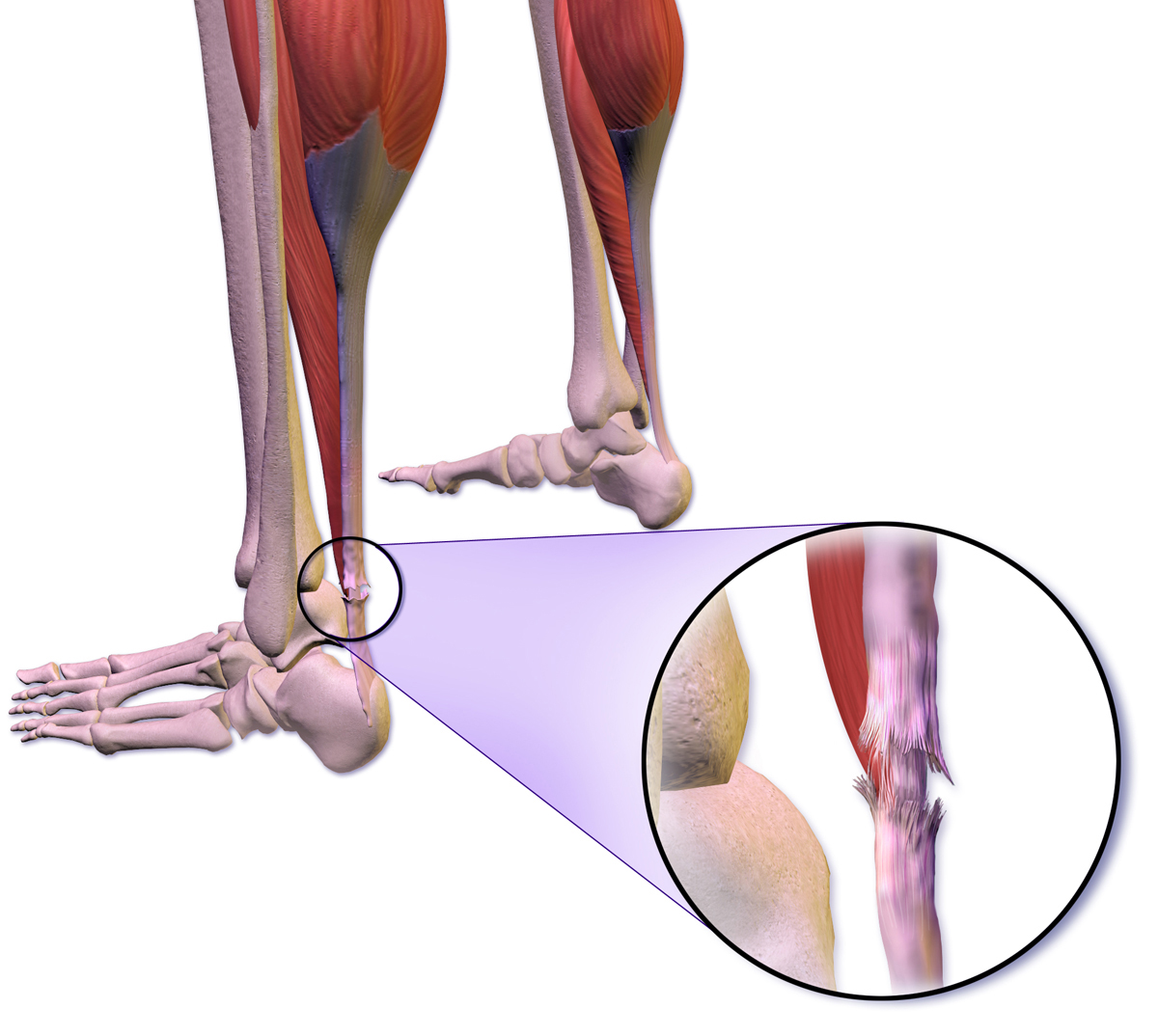
Ruptured Achilles tendon

Although the interaction is virtual, the injuries are very real and resemble injuries seen in real-life sports ranging from head to toe. A neck-related injury was first reported in 2009 when a 38-year-old man swung his remote control forcefully enough to send him to the emergency department. This injury required a minor surgery to address due to physical therapy being unable to address the individual's symptoms. Additionally, a 44-year-old woman needed surgery to recover from an unstable knee due to a prior anterior cruciate ligament (ACL) tear while playing Wii Sports that failed physical therapy recovery just 6 months prior.

A case report from 2004 that was published in The Lancet described a blister on the thumb caused by repetitive use of a PlayStation 2 controller. The writer dubbed the condition "PS2 thumb". While named similarly to Nintendo thumb, the two do not have the same cause. PlayStation thumb is caused by friction and affects the skin (though associated symptoms can include pain and stiffness in the hands, shoulders, and neck), while Nintendo thumb is caused by injuries to the tendon.

=== Different forms of Wii-itis ===
Wii-itis is the general term that is used for any inflammatory disease or injury due to playing with the Wii console. These injuries are categorized into four major classes: tendinopathy, bursitis (inflammation of fluid filled sacs around joints), enthesitis ("inflammation of sites where tendons and ligaments are attached to the bone"), and epicondylitis (degeneration of the origin of a tendon in the forearm due to overuse of an extensor muscle).

Common forms of injuries related to the Wii include:

==== Wii knee ====
Wii knee describes knee-related injuries that happen while playing with the Wii console. According to a case report from 2008, a teenager twisted and fell on his knee while playing the Wii which caused a lateral patella dislocation. The treatment for his injury required surgery, and he recovered well. This injury can cause osteochondral fractures, tears in tendons, and meniscal injury.

==== Wii shoulder ====
Wii shoulder is soreness and pain in shoulder and upper extremities, often due to playing games like Wii tennis or bowling. A case report of a 22-year-old man who injured his left arm after playing a bowling game on Wii was published in 2008. The injury resulted in pain and swelling.

==== Achilles Wii-itis ====
Based on case reports, Achilles tendon injuries can happen with different degrees of severity while playing Wii. These injuries may include tear or complete rupture of Achilles tendon. The rupture of the tendon will require surgery, while minor tears can be addressed with non-surgical treatments like physical therapy and use of NSAIDs. In 2009, a case report was published describing a 42-year-old woman who tore her left Achilles tendon after stretching her leg on her Wii Fit board.

=== PlayStation-related injuries ===
==== PlayStation thumb ====
PlayStation thumb is defined, similarly to Nintendo thumb, as a repetitive strain injury (RSI) caused by excessive use of a PlayStation controller. This condition includes blistering of the thumbs due to excessive use of pressure and friction with the PlayStation controller during gameplay. There is also hardening of the skin on the thumb (lichenified hyperkeratotic papules) causing the skin to appear leathery. It can also be accompanied by changes to the nail, such as the nail plate lifting from the skin. Other symptoms include stiffness, swelling, pain, and tingling in the arm joints such as wrists, elbows, and shoulders.

The first case of PlayStation thumb was recognized in a letter to an editor in 2004 from a 9-year-old boy. The boy played PlayStation 2 in a rapid manner for about 20 minutes and felt his thumb become numb and a blister formed. After ceasing gameplay for one week, the thumb healed. Several other cases have been published as well. A study involving 120 students in South Africa followed up on the 2004 correspondence and found that 7 of the 17 girls and 8 of the 28 boys who played PlayStation had symptoms of PlayStation Thumb.

==== PlayStation palmar hidradenitis ====
Hidradenitis has been diagnosed through an examination to confirm the presence of neutrophils (a type of immune cell present during inflammation) in the eccrine sweat glands. Palmar hidradenitis is the inflammation of the palm, primarily in the eccrine sweat glands, causing lesions on the palmar surface of the hands. These lesions develop when people spend prolonged periods of time using their hands to hold and manipulate PlayStation controllers.

As of 2021, there have been two reported instances of PlayStation palmar hidradenitis:

The first case was in 2009 in a 12-year-old girl. She had painful skin lesions on both palms and nowhere else on her body, and the cause of the condition was sourced to playing PlayStation for several hours per day prior to the lesions forming. After the lesions formed, the girl continued to play PlayStation games, but less intensely than before, which caused the lesions to develop more. The lesions went away completely after stopping playing PlayStation for 10 days.

The second case was in 2017 in a 14-year-old boy who had painful palmar nodules after spending prolonged periods of time playing games and using his mobile phone. Similarly to the last case, he had inflammation containing neutrophils in the eccrine sweat glands in his palms. The palmer lesions healed on their own in two weeks after stopping PlayStation gameplay.

== See also ==
- Video game-related health problems
- Blackberry thumb
- Tennis elbow
- Golfer's elbow
