= Elaine Murphy, Baroness Murphy =

British psychiatrist, academic and peer (born 1947)

The Right Honourable The Baroness Murphy
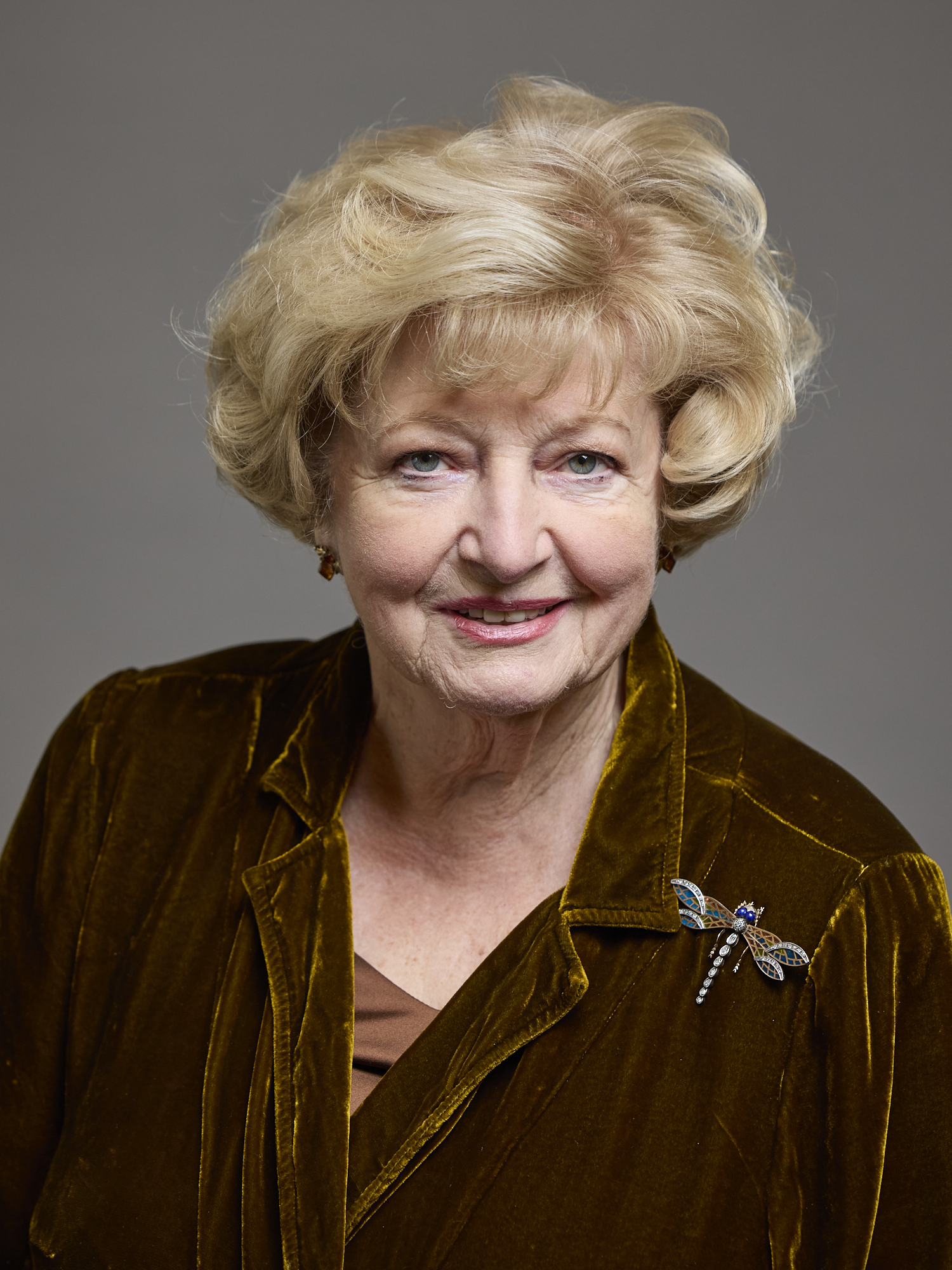
- Official portrait of Baroness Murphy, 2024

Member of the House of Lords
- Lord Temporal
- Life peerage 17 June 2004

Personal details
- Born: Elaine Murphy; 16 January 1947 (age 79)
- Party: Crossbencher

Elaine Murphy, Baroness Murphy (born 16 January 1947) is a British psychiatrist, academic, and politician who sits as a crossbench (politically independent) member of the House of Lords.

== Career ==
After qualifying as a doctor, she trained as a psychiatrist in London teaching hospitals, at The Royal Free Hospital and University College Hospitals, incorporating a two-year attachment to the National Hospital for Nervous Diseases (now Neurology and Neurosurgery) and then spent time at The London Hospital (now the Royal London Hospital) where she also studied geriatric medicine while also training at Goodmayes Hospital in east London.

From 1978 to 1980 she spent two years as a researcher with the MRC Social Research Unit at Bedford College University of London with Professor George W Brown, investigating mental health disorders in the community and completing an MD.

She was awarded the 1980 Research Prize of the Royal College of Psychiatrists (the Bronze Medal).

After a period as a consultant psychiatrist in east London, Murphy pursued an academic career. She became the first professor of psychiatry of old age in the UK at the University of London at Guy's and St Thomas' Hospitals from 1983 to 1996, but also developing a multidisciplinary community-based service model in inner south London. She spent a period as a National Health Service general manager between 1984 and 1990 which included for three years the post of District General Manager for Lewisham and North Southwark Health Authority.

From 1987-1994 Murphy was vice chairman of the Mental Health Act Commission and acting chair during the absence of the chairman Louis Blom-Cooper in 1994. During their leadership the Commission was transformed into a more business-like organisation. She was a panel member of public inquiries into untoward incidents at Ashworth Special Hospital and also at the Edith Morgan Unit, Torbay Hospital.

After retirement, she took on non-executive roles in the NHS; her final role was chair of North East London Strategic Health Authority until 30 June 2006.

She was a visiting professor at Queen Mary University of London, vice-president and later ambassador of the Alzheimer's Society and Chair of Council at St George's, University of London between 2009 and 2012 and was also a non-executive member of Monitor (independent monitor of NHS Hospitals).

On 17 June 2004, she was made a life peer as Baroness Murphy, of Aldgate in the City of London, taking an interest in mental health and ageing issues in the House of Lords where she sits as a crossbencher.

== Publications ==
Murphy has published in the medical academic field including six books and more than 120 papers. She is best known for her studies of late life depression and in improving care of people with dementia. She also has a PhD (University College London 2000) in social history and has published in the field of 18th and 19th century workhouses, metropolitan pauper farms, madhouses and the local history of the Waveney Valley, East Anglia. Her local history publications include Wingfield, Suffolk’s Forgotten Castle (2021), Monks Hall, The History of a Waveney Valley Manor (2018), and The Moated Grange: A History of South Norfolk Through the Story of one Home, 1300-2000 (2015), about the village of Brockdish in South Norfolk.

In January 2009, it was revealed that she was the author of a hoax letter about "cello scrotum" that was printed in the British Medical Journal in 1974.
