= List of Ashland University alumni =

Ashland University is a Christian university in Ashland, Ohio. Following are some of its notable alumni.

== Academia ==
- Benjamin Bolger – a perpetual student who has earned 14 degrees
- Robert Clouse – professor
- Jill DeMatteis – Pat Doyle Award winner; research associate professor at the University of Maryland, College Park
- J. Garber Drushal – eighth president of the College of Wooster
- Charles H. Kraft – anthropologist, linguist, evangelical Christian speaker, and professor
- Peter Linneman 1973 – Albert Sussman Professor of Real Estate, Finance and Public Policy, Wharton School of Business
- Bruce McLarty (received doctorate) – president of Harding University
- Clara Worst Miller – academic and writer

== Business ==
- Koo Bon-moo – business executive of the LG Group
- Dwight Schar 1964 – chairman, president and CEO Northern Virginia/Ryan Homes

== Entertainment ==
- Dwier Brown 1980 – actor; Field of Dreams, The Thorn Birds
- Robin Meade 1991 – CNN news anchor, 1992 Miss Ohio
- Xiong Ru-Lin – Chinese singer
- Kurt St. Thomas – filmmaker, author and radio DJ
- Amy Stoch –actress

== Law ==
- Daniel Bogden – attorney and United States attorney for the District of Nevada

== Politics ==
- Bill Bell – West Virginia House of Delegates
- Jack Brandenburg – Michigan state senator
- Dean DePiero – mayor of Parma, Ohio
- William Harvey Gibson – Republican politician from Ohio
- Marilyn John – politician
- Joe Miller – Ohio House of Representatives

== Religion ==
- Madalyn Murray O'Hair – founder of American Atheists
- John Christopher Thomas – theologian within the Pentecostal movement; Clarence J. Abbott Professor of Biblical Studies at the Pentecostal Theological Seminary

== Sports ==
- Trevor Bassitt – bronze medal winner at the 2022 World Championships in the 400m hurdles
- Gil Dodds 1941 – set the American record for the mile in 1942, and in 1943 was honored with the Sullivan Award
- Bayard Elfvin 2003 – US National soccer team goalkeeper
- Madman Fulton – professional wrestler
- Judy Hahn – head coach of women's volleyball at Malone College
- Alex Hendricks – cerebral palsy football player and Paralympian
- Carlin Isles 2012 (attended two years) – United States national rugby sevens team
- Jackie Jeschelnig – hammer thrower
- Kibwé Johnson – Olympic track and field athlete
- Ruth Jones – head women's basketball coach for Purdue University
- Walter Leckrone – newspaper editor and college football and basketball coach
- Jamie Meder 2014 – American football player
- Katie Moon – pole vaulter and gold medalist at the 2020 Tokyo Olympics
- Ray Novotny 1930 – professional football player
- Bill Overmyer 1971 – professional football player
- Jeris Pendleton 2011 – professional football player
- Tim Richmond (attended one year) – NASCAR driver
- Adam Shaheen 2017 – professional football player
- Rick Shepas – college football player and coach
- Art Warren – professional baseball pitcher in the New York Yankees organization
- Mike Wright (attended one year) – professional football player

== Writing and journalism ==
- Detrick Hughes 2011 – author, poet
- Walter Leckrone – newspaper editor and college football and basketball coach
