= S. Georgia Nugent =

20th President of Illinois Wesleyan University
- In office November 2019 – July 1, 2024
- Preceded by: Eric R. Jensen
- Succeeded by: Sheahon Zenger

Interim President of the College of Wooster
- In office July 1, 2015 – June 30, 2016
- Preceded by: Grant Cornwell
- Succeeded by: Sarah Bolton

18th President of Kenyon College
- In office 2003–2013
- Preceded by: Robert A. Oden
- Succeeded by: Sean M. Decatur

Personal details
- Born: Susan Georgia Nugent New Orleans, Louisiana, U.S.
- Spouse: Thomas Scherer
- Education: Princeton University (BA); Cornell University (PhD)
- Profession: Professor
- Website: Office of the President

Susan Georgia Nugent was the 20th president of Illinois Wesleyan University. She was president of Kenyon College in Gambier, Ohio from 2003 to 2013, and interim president of the College of Wooster in Wooster, Ohio for the 2015-16 academic year. She was succeeded at Kenyon by Sean M. Decatur, former dean of Arts and Sciences at Oberlin College, and at Wooster by Sarah Bolton, former dean of Williams College. In November of 2019, Nugent became the first woman to serve as President of Illinois Wesleyan University. On April 10 it was announced that Sheahon Zenger would succeed her role as president in the 24-25 school year.

== Early career ==
Nugent was born in New Orleans, Louisiana, and attended Princeton University, from which she graduated cum laude in 1973. She earned a Ph.D. in classics from Cornell University and taught at Swarthmore College, Princeton, and Brown University. Her academic speciality, reflected in numerous publications, was epic poetry and Greek tragedy. She returned to the classics department at Princeton in 1992 and also worked in the university's administration for a decade, including as associate provost and, later, as dean of the McGraw Center.

== College President ==
Nugent became Kenyon College's 18th president and first female president in 2003. As president, she oversaw the construction of the $70 million Kenyon Athletic Center (KAC), and undertook the largest capital campaign in the college's 188-year history. President Nugent was an outspoken supporter of the Amethyst Initiative, which she co-authored with 8 other presidents of American colleges and universities in 2008.

After leaving Kenyon, she joined the Council of Independent Colleges (CIC) as a senior fellow to lead their Campaign for the Liberal Arts.

In August 2019, S. Georgia Nugent became Illinois Wesleyan University's Interim President for the 2019-2020 academic year. The university's 19th President Eric Jensen announced in May 2019 that he will be stepping down after four years with the university. He also announced his subsequent retirement from higher education.

On November 14, 2019, Nugent was selected as the 20th and first female president of Illinois Wesleyan University.

Original scan of the cartoon drawn by S. Georgia Nugent for publication in the Illinois Wesleyan University student newspaper The Argus. She switched roles with LC Killian, a student who was also the Artistic Director and cartoonist for The Argus, for the “President for a Day” experience. Nugent drew herself smiling while reading Hegel outside State Farm Hall, and Killian frowning while looking at the budget in Holmes Hall. Her initials act as her signature on the bottom right-hand side. Drawn on February 21, 2023.

On President's Day, S. Georgia Nugent often switched roles with a Kenyon, or later, Illinois Wesleyan student in a "President for a Day" experience. The selected student went to faculty and staff meetings while she attended their classes, visited professors during their office hours, ate meals at the campus dining hall, and participated in student clubs or extracurricular activities. One such occasion involved Nugent drawing a cartoon to appear in the Illinois Wesleyan student newspaper, The Argus, as the student selected to switch spots with her for the day was both the Artistic Director and a cartoonist for the periodical. The cartoon depicts her smiling outside a buildings on campus, reading a book by Hegel, while the student is in her office frowning at the budget. President Nugent chose each of the students to switch places with through a contest that asked the student body why they wanted to be President for a day.
