= Albion College Symphony Orchestra =

The Albion College Symphony Orchestra is the only orchestral ensemble attached to the Albion College Department of Music. It rehearses and performs in Goodrich Chapel, located on the Albion College campus. As of 2021 the orchestra has over 50 members and is currently under the direction of Dr. Ji Hyun Kim. Auditions are held on the first two days of the semester and are open to students of any major and to members of surrounding communities. The Albion College Symphony Orchestra holds several free concerts every semester that are open to the general public.

== Annual concerto competition ==
Every spring semester, the Albion College Symphony Orchestra holds a concerto competition where students from the college have the opportunity to perform a concerto with the orchestra during its Concerto Concert in April.
