= Dover Beach =

1867 poem by Matthew Arnold

"Dover Beach" is a lyric poem by the English poet Matthew Arnold. It was first published in 1867 in the collection New Poems; however, surviving notes indicate its composition may have begun as early as 1849. The most likely date is 1851.

The title, locale and subject of the poem's descriptive opening lines is the shore of the English ferry port of Dover, in Kent, facing Calais, in France, at the Strait of Dover, the narrowest part (21 miles (34 km)) of the English Channel, where Arnold spent his honeymoon in 1851. Many of the beaches in this part of England are made up of small stones or pebbles rather than sand, and Arnold describes the sea ebbing over the stones as a "grating roar".

== Analysis ==
In Stefan Collini's opinion, "Dover Beach" is a difficult poem to analyze, and some of its passages and metaphors have become so well known that they are hard to see with "fresh eyes". Arnold begins with a naturalistic and detailed nightscape of the beach at Dover in which auditory imagery plays a significant role ("Listen! you hear the grating roar"). The beach, however, is bare, with only a hint of humanity in a light that "gleams and is gone". Reflecting the traditional notion that the poem was written during Arnold's honeymoon (see composition section), one critic notes that "the speaker might be talking to his bride". Because Arnold was known for his discontent with the current state of society during his time, this poem is coming from the point of view of a man who feels as though society is not as beautiful as it once was. However, he sees a glimmer of hope through his lover.

The sea is calm to-night,
The tide is full, the moon lies fair
Upon the straits;—on the French coast, the light
Gleams, and is gone; the cliffs of England stand,
Glimmering and vast, out in the tranquil bay.
Come to the window, sweet is the night-air!
Only, from the long line of spray
Where the sea meets the moon-blanched land,
Listen! you hear the grating roar
Of pebbles which the waves draw back, and fling,
At their return, up the high strand,
Begin, and cease, and then again begin,
With tremulous cadence slow, and bring
The eternal note of sadness in.

— Lines 1–14

Arnold looks at two aspects of this scene, its soundscape (in the first and second stanzas) and the retreating action of the tide (in the third stanza). He hears the sound of the sea as "the eternal note of sadness". Sophocles, a 5th-century BC Greek playwright who wrote tragedies on fate and the will of the gods, also heard this sound as he stood upon the shore of the Aegean Sea. Critics differ widely on how to interpret this image of the Greek classical age. One sees a difference between Sophocles interpreting the "note of sadness" humanistically, while Arnold, in the industrial nineteenth century, hears in this sound the retreat of religion and faith. A more recent critic connects the two as artists, Sophocles the tragedian, Arnold the lyric poet, each attempting to transform this note of sadness into "a higher order of experience".

Sophocles long ago
Heard it on the Ægæan, and it brought
Into his mind the turbid ebb and flow
Of human misery; we
Find also in the sound a thought,
Hearing it by this distant northern sea.

— Lines 15–20

Having examined the soundscape, Arnold turns to the action of the water wave itself and sees in its retreat a metaphor for the loss of faith in the modern age, once again expressed in an auditory image ("But now I only hear / Its melancholy, long, withdrawing roar"). This fourth stanza begins with an image not of sadness, but of "joyous fulness" similar in beauty to the image with which the poem opens.

The sea of faith
Was once, too, at the full, and round earth's shore
Lay like the folds of a bright girdle furl'd;
But now I only hear
Its melancholy, long, withdrawing roar,
Retreating to the breath
Of the night-wind, down the vast edges drear
And naked shingles of the world.

— Lines 21–28

The final stanza begins with an appeal to love, then moves on to the famous ending metaphor. Critics have varied in their interpretation of the first two lines; one calls them a "perfunctory gesture ... swallowed up by the poem's powerfully dark picture", while another sees in them "a stand against a world of broken faith". Midway between these is one of Arnold's biographers, who describes being "true / To one another" as "a precarious notion" in a world that has become "a maze of confusion".

The list of disappointments, “neither joy, nor love, nor light,/ Nor certitude, nor peace, nor help for pain;” seems to reflect disillusionment with God’s promise that, “neither death, nor life, nor angels, nor principalities, nor powers, nor things present, nor things to come, nor height, nor depth, nor any other creature, shall be able to separate us from the love of God.” (Romans 8:38-39)

The metaphor with which the poem ends is most likely an allusion to a passage in Thucydides's account of the Peloponnesian War (Book 7, 44). He describes an ancient battle that occurred on a similar beach during the Athenian invasion of Sicily. The battle took place at night; the attacking army became disoriented while fighting in the darkness and many of their soldiers inadvertently killed each other. This final image has also been variously interpreted by the critics. Culler calls the "darkling plain" Arnold's "central statement" of the human condition. Pratt sees the final line as "only metaphor" and thus susceptible to the "uncertainty" of poetic language.

Ah, love, let us be true
To one another! for the world, which seems
To lie before us like a land of dreams,
So various, so beautiful, so new,
Hath really neither joy, nor love, nor light,
Nor certitude, nor peace, nor help for pain;
And we are here as on a darkling plain
Swept with confused alarms of struggle and flight,
Where ignorant armies clash by night.

— Lines 29–37

"The poem's discourse", Honan writes, "shifts literally and symbolically from the present, to Sophocles on the Aegean, from Medieval Europe back to the present—and the auditory and visual images are dramatic and mimetic and didactic. Exploring the dark terror that lies beneath his happiness in love, the speaker resolves to love—and exigencies of history and the nexus between lovers are the poem's real issues. That lovers may be 'true / To one another' is a precarious notion: love in the modern city momentarily gives peace, but nothing else in a post-medieval society reflects or confirms the faithfulness of lovers. Devoid of love and light the world is a maze of confusion left by 'retreating' faith."

Critics have questioned the unity of the poem, noting that the sea of the opening stanza does not appear in the final stanza, while the "darkling plain" of the final line is not apparent in the opening. Various solutions to this problem have been proffered. Culler saw the "darkling plain" with which the poem ends as comparable to the "naked shingles of the world". "Shingles" here means flat beach cobbles, characteristic of some wave-swept coasts. Pratt found the poem "emotionally convincing" even if its logic may be questionable. The same critic notes that "the poem upends our expectations of metaphor" and sees in this the central power of the poem. The poem's historicism creates another complicating dynamic. Beginning in the present it shifts to the classical age of Greece, then (with its concerns for the sea of faith) it turns to Medieval Europe, before finally returning to the present. The form of the poem itself has drawn considerable comment. Critics have noted the careful diction in the opening description, the overall, spell-binding rhythm and cadence of the poem and its dramatic character. One commentator sees the strophe-antistrophe of the ode at work in the poem, with an ending that contains something of the "cata-strophe" of tragedy. Finally, one critic sees the complexity of the poem's structure resulting in "the first major 'free-verse' poem in the language".

== Composition ==
According to Tinker and Howard F. Lowry, "a draft of the first twenty-eight lines of the poem" was written in pencil "on the back of a folded sheet of paper containing notes on the career of Empedocles". Allott concludes that the notes are probably from around 1849–50. "Empedocles on Etna", again according to Allott, was probably written 1849–52; the notes on Empedocles are likely to be contemporary with the writing of that poem.

The final line of this draft is:

And naked shingles of the world. Ah love &c

Tinker and Lowry conclude that this "seem[s] to indicate that the last nine lines of the poem as we know it were already in existence when the portion regarding the ebb and flow of the sea at Dover was composed." This would make the manuscript "a prelude to the concluding paragraph" of the poem in which "there is no reference to the sea or tides".

Arnold's visits to Dover may also provide some clue to the date of composition. Allott has Arnold in Dover in June 1851 and again in October of that year "on his return from his delayed continental honeymoon". To critics who conclude that ll. 1–28 were written at Dover and ll. 29–37 "were rescued from some discarded poem" Allott suggests the contrary, i.e., that the final lines "were written at Dover in late June," while "ll. 29–37 were written in London shortly afterwards".

== Influence ==
William Butler Yeats responds directly to Arnold's pessimism in his four-line poem "The Nineteenth Century and After" (1929):

Though the great song return no more
There's keen delight in what we have:
The rattle of pebbles on the shore
Under the receding wave.

Anthony Hecht, United States Poet Laureate in the early 1980s, replied to "Dover Beach" in his poem "The Dover Bitch".

So there stood Matthew Arnold and this girl
With the cliffs of England crumbling away behind them,
And he said to her, "Try to be true to me,
And I'll do the same for you, for things are bad
All over, etc., etc."

— Lines 1–5

The anonymous figure to whom Arnold addresses his poem becomes the subject of Hecht's poem. In Hecht's poem she "caught the bitter allusion to the sea", imagined "what his whiskers would feel like / On the back of her neck", and felt sad as she looked out across the channel. "And then she got really angry" at the thought that she had become "a sort of mournful cosmic last resort". After which she says "one or two unprintable things".

But you mustn't judge her by that. What I mean to say is,
She's really all right. I still see her once in a while
And she always treats me right.

— Lines 23–25

Kenneth and Miriam Allott, referring to "The Dover Bitch" as "an irreverent jeu d'esprit", nonetheless see, particularly in the line "a sort of mournful cosmic last resort", an extension of the original poem's main theme.

"Dover Beach" has been mentioned in a number of novels, plays, poems, films and songs:

- Samuel Barber composed a setting of "Dover Beach" in 1931 for baritone and string quartet.
- In Dodie Smith's novel, I Capture the Castle (1940), the book's protagonist remarks that Debussy's Clair de Lune reminds her of "Dover Beach" (in the film adaptation of the novel, the character quotes (or, rather, misquotes) a line from the poem).
- In Fahrenheit 451 (1953), author Ray Bradbury has his protagonist Guy Montag read part of "Dover Beach" to his wife Mildred and her friends after attempts at intellectual conversation fail and Montag discovers just how shallow and uncaring they are about their families and the world around them. One of Mildred's friends cries over the poem while the other chastises Montag for exposing them to something she deems obscene and the two break off their friendship with Mildred in disgust as they leave the house.
- Joseph Heller's novel Catch-22 (1961) alludes to the poem in the chapter "Havermyer": "the open-air movie theater in which—for the daily amusement of the dying—ignorant armies clashed by night on a collapsible screen."
- Charles M. Fair in The Dying Self (1969) speaks of "the coming of this unhappy epoch, in which men are a danger to themselves roughly in proportion to their own triviality, announced in the Victorian Age" and exemplified by "the only first-rate poem Arnold ever wrote: 'Dover Beach'."
- Ian McEwan quotes part of the poem in his novel Saturday (2005), where the effects of its beauty and language are so strong and impressive that it moves a brutal criminal to tears and remorse. He also seems to have borrowed the main setting of his novella On Chesil Beach (2005) from "Dover Beach", additionally playing with the fact that Arnold's poem was composed on his honeymoon (see above).
- Sam Wharton quotes the final stanza in his Jonathan Hare novel Ignorant Armies, set in 1954, and one of his characters uses it as a commentary on the failure of senior people to maintain appropriate standards of conduct.
- In the musical Cabaret (1966), the American aspiring novelist Cliff Bradshaw recites parts of the poem to the singer Sally Bowles because she wants to hear proper English after having been in Berlin for some time.
- In P. D. James's novel Devices and Desires (1989) her character Adam Dalgliesh, thinking about his response to a police officer after having discovered a murder on a beach on the north-east coast of Norfolk, about "walking and thinking" on the beach notes: "I was thinking about the clash of ignorant armies by night, since no poet walks by the sea at moonlight without silently reciting Matthew Arnold's marvellous poem."
- In a short story by Robert Aickman, "The View," first published in 1951 in We Are for the Dark, a collection of three stories each by Aickman and Elizabeth Jane Howard.
- "Jakarta", short story by Alice Munro.
- The Last Gentleman by Walker Percy.
- A Song for Lya by George R. R. Martin.
- Portnoy's Complaint by Philip Roth.
- Rush's song "Armour and Sword", from the 2007 album Snakes and Arrows (lyrics by Neil Peart).
- The Bangles' song "Dover Beach", from the 1984 album All Over the Place (lyrics by Susanna Hoffs and Vicki Peterson).
- The Fugs adapted the last stanza of "Dover Beach" to music by Tuli Kupferberg, on their 1967 album Tenderness Junction.
- Nora's Lost, a short drama by Alan Haehnel.
- Daljit Nagra's prize-winning poem "Look We Have Coming to Dover!" quotes as its epigraph the line: "So various, so beautiful, so new".
- The poem "Moon" by Billy Collins.
- The travel narrative A Summer in Gascony (2008) by Martin Calder.
- The Flying Dutchman character quotes the last 12 lines as he looks towards the sea in the 1951 movie Pandora and the Flying Dutchman.
- Kevin Kline's character, Cal Gold, in the film 2001 The Anniversary Party recites part of "Dover Beach" as a toast.
- Jeffrey Eugenides, The Marriage Plot, p. 201 (bottom), Farrar Straus and Giroux paperback edn 2011.
- Jo Baker, A Country Road, A Tree (2015), p. 24, when protagonist Samuel Beckett recalls lines 9–10 when walking by the sea at Greystones, Co. Wicklow.
- The Man Without a Shadow, a 2016 novel by Joyce Carol Oates.
- Forsythia, a poem by Billy Collins.

The poem has also provided a ready source for titles:

- On a Darkling Plain by Clifford Irving, A Darkling Plain by Philip Reeve, As on a Darkling Plain by Ben Bova (the title refers to the plain of a Saturnian moon covered with strange unexplained artefacts), A Tour of the Darkling Plain (the Finnegans Wake correspondence of Adaline Glasheen and Thornton Wilder), Clash by Night, a play by Clifford Odets (later made into a film noir by Fritz Lang), Clash by Night, a science fiction novel by Lewis Padgett (Henry Kuttner & CL Moore), Ignorant Armies by Sam Wharton, and Norman Mailer's National Book Award winner The Armies of the Night, about the 1967 March on the Pentagon.
- The Sea of Faith movement is so called as the name is taken from this poem, as the poet expresses regret that belief in a supernatural world is slowly slipping away; the "sea of faith" is withdrawing like the ebbing tide.
- Sea of Faith by John Brehm, a collection of poems [The University of Wisconsin Press, 2004] (and the title of the eponymous poem, which begins "Once when I was teaching 'Dover Beach'".
- In the Richard Condon novel Arigato (1972), the protagonist Captain Huntingdon ponders leaving his innocence behind and recites the following lines:

Ah, love, let us be true
To one another! for the world, which seems
To lie before us like a land of dreams,
So various, so beautiful, so new,
Hath really neither joy, nor love, nor light,
Nor certitude, nor peace, nor help for pain;
And we are here as on a darkling plain
Swept with confused alarms of struggle and flight,
Where ignorant armies clash by night.

— Lines 29 to 37

Even in the U. S. Supreme Court the poem has had its influence: Justice William Rehnquist, in his concurring opinion in Northern Pipeline Co. v. Marathon Pipe Line Co., 458 US 50 (1982), called judicial decisions regarding Congress's power to create legislative courts "landmarks on a judicial 'darkling plain' where ignorant armies have clashed by night."

== General and cited references ==
For a more thorough bibliography see Matthew Arnold.

- Professors Chauncey Brewster Tinker and Howard Foster Lowry, The Poetry of Matthew Arnold: A Commentary (New York: Oxford University Press, 1940), Alibris ID 8235403151
- Kenneth Allott (editor), The Poems of Matthew Arnold (London and New York: Longman Norton, 1965), ISBN 0-393-04377-0
- Park Honan, Matthew Arnold, a life (New York: McGraw-Hill, 1981), ISBN 0-07-029697-9
- A. Dwight Culler, Imaginative Reason: The Poetry of Matthew Arnold (New Haven: Yale University Press, 1966).
- Stefan Collini, Arnold (Oxford: Oxford University Press, 1988), ISBN 0-19-287660-0
- Linda Ray Pratt, Matthew Arnold Revisited, (New York: Twayne Publishers, 2000), ISBN 0-8057-1698-X
- The text of the poem is as in Poetry and Criticism of Matthew Arnold, edited by Dwight Culler, Boston: Houghton Mifflin Company, 1961; ISBN 0-395-05152-5 and Matthew Arnold's Poems ed. Kenneth Allott (pub. J. M. Dent & Sons Ltd, 1965). The editors of this page have opted for the elided spellings on several words ("blanch'd," "furl'd") consistent with these texts.
- Melvyn Bragg, In Our Time – Victorian Pessimism, BBC Radio 4, Thu 10 May 2007
