= Brooke Barnett =

American educator

16th President of Rollins College
- Incumbent
- Assumed office July 2025
- Preceded by: Grant Cornwell

Personal details
- Born: Kentucky, U.S.
- Education: Indiana University Bloomington (MA, PhD); Georgetown College (BA)
- Website: Office of the President

Brooke Barnett is an American educator and academic. Since 2025 she has served as the 16th president of Rollins College in Winter Park, Florida. She previously worked at Butler University, Elon University, and Indiana University Bloomington.

== Career ==
In July 2025 she assumed the role of the 16th president of Rollins College in Winter Park, Florida, following her role as Butler University's Provost and Executive Vice President for Academic Affairs. Previously, she served as the Dean of the College of Communication at Butler and has held numerous faculty and administrative roles at Elon University.

She has been a Board member for Higher Education Resource Services (HERS) since 2023, was a board member for the American Association of Colleges and Universities from 2018 to 2022, and is a member of Arthur Page Society.

== Scholarship ==
Barnett's scholarship and teaching are in the areas of communication and higher education. She has authored numerous books, journal articles and monographs, including:

- Barnett, Brooke; Felten, Peter, eds. (2016). Intersectionality in Action: A Guide for Faculty and Campus Leaders for Creating Inclusive Classrooms and Institutions. Taylor & Francis. ISBN 978-1-000-98137-7.
- Barnett, Brooke; Copeland, David; Makemson, Harlen; Motley, Phillip (2011). An Introduction to Visual Theory and Practice in the Digital Age. New York City: Peter Lang. ISBN 978-1-4331-0903-4.
- Barnett, Brooke; Reynolds, Amy (2009). Terrorism and the Press: An Uneasy Relationship. New York City: Peter Lang. ISBN 978-0-8204-9516-3.
- Barnett, Brooke (2005). Copeland, David A. (ed.). The war on terror and the wars in Iraq. The Greenwood Library of American War Reporting. Vol. 8. Westport, Conn: Greenwood Press. ISBN 978-0-313-33435-1.
- Reynolds, Amy; Barnett, Brooke, eds. (2006-08-15). Communication and Law: Multidisciplinary Approaches to Research. Routledge. ISBN 978-1-135-61322-8.
- Barnett, Brooke (2003-09-01). "Guilty and Threatening: Visual Bias in Television News Crime Stories". Journalism & Communication Monographs. 5 (3): 104–155. doi:10.1177/152263790300500301. ISSN 1522-6379.

== Education ==
Barnett received her Ph.D. in Mass Communication in 2001 and her M.A. in Journalism in 1995 from Indiana University Bloomington. In 1993 she received her B.A. in English and Communications Studies from Georgetown College. Barnett also attended Harvard Graduate School of Education, Institute for Educational Management program in 2016. She received a Management certificate from Cornell University School of Industrial and Labor Relations in 2013, attended the Higher Education Leadership Institute in 2011, and the Scripps Howard Leadership Academy in 2009.
