= Wayne P. Webster =

American academic

Wayne P. Webster is an American academic administrator and the 18th and current president of Albion College. Previously, he was the interim president and vice president for advancement at The College of Wooster.

== Early life ==
Wayne P. Webster, born in Rocky Ford, Colorado, in 1978. Webster graduated in 2000 from Doane University in Crete, Nebraska, here he earned a bachelor’s degree in public administration and political science, was a member of the football team, served as a residence hall assistant, and earned a Bulldog Award for his commitment to leadership and service to the Doane Community. Before he pursued a master's of management from Doane University, he worked as a press intern on Capitol Hill in Washington, D.C. for Senator Bob Kerrey. In 2015, he earned his Ed.D. from The George Washington University.

== Career ==
From 2000 to 2005, Webster worked as an advancement associate and, then ultimately, assistant director of major gifts at Doane University.

Webster held a multiple roles in the advancement office at Gettysburg College from 2006 to 2010.

For the years of 2010 to 2015, Webster served as vice president for advancement at Ripon College.

Webster served as vice president for development and alumni relations at the University of Northern Colorado from 2015 to 2017.

Webster served as the vice president for advancement at The College of Wooster from 2017 to 2022.

While Webster held the job as the vice president for advancement, he was also a member of the campus master planning steering committee and the steering committee for the $35 million renovation and expansion of the Lowry Campus Center.

Webster became interim president of The College of Wooster, in 2022 and held it until 2023. During this period, he initiated a sustainable budget planning process and oversaw the grand opening of the renovated Lowry Center.

On July 1, 2023, Webster became the 18th president of Albion College. During his tenure as the college’s president, he launched the college's Pathway Forward plan. During 2023, he led efforts for Albion to join CREDO’s Moving the Needle cohort, a campus-wide focus on increasing retention and graduation rates of all students.

== Affiliations and awards ==
Webster is on the board of directors for the Michigan Independent Colleges and Universities and the Great Lakes Colleges Association. He represents the Michigan Intercollegiate Athletic Association as a member of the NCAA’s President’s Advisory Group for Division III athletics.

In 2014, Webster received an Education Fundraising Award for Overall Performance from the Council for the Advancement and Support of Education (CASE) in recognition of the success of Ripon College’s Imagine Tomorrow campaign.

Webster was appointed into the 2014-2015 cohort for the American Academic Leadership Institute's Executive Leadership Academy in Washington, DC.

From Indiana University's Lilly Family School of Philanthropy, he earned a Certificate in Fund Raising Management (CFRM).

== Selected works ==
- Webster, W. P., & Messitte, Z. P. (2017). Tackling the Emerging New Norms in Higher Education in Post-Recession America. In H. Alphin, Jr., J. Lavine, & R. Chan (Eds.), Disability and Equity in Higher Education Accessibility (pp. 46-62). Hershey, PA: IGI Global. doi:10.4018/978-1-5225-2665-0.ch002
- Webster, W. P., Jakeman, R. C., & Swayze, S. (2016). The role of philanthropy on the strategic planning process of a selective liberal arts and science college. In H. Alphin Jr., J. Lavine, S. Stark, & A. Hocker (Eds.) Facilitating Higher Education Growth through Fundraising and Philanthropy (pp. 228-255). Hershey, PA: Information Science Reference. doi:10.4018/978-1-4666-9664-8.ch010
- Reprinted in 2020 in Start-ups and SMEs: Concepts, Methodologies, Tools, and Applications (pp. 1364-1384). Hershey, PA: IGI Global. ISBN 9781799817611.ch070
- Webster, W. P. (2014). The influence of philanthropy and administrative decision-making models on a liberal arts college's strategic planning process: A case study. (Order No. 3609047, The George Washington University). ProQuest Dissertations and Theses.
- Jackson, N. M. (2014). Everything you need to know about campaigns. CASE Currents. Nov/Dec. 2014. (Contributed content and quoted within.)
- Webster, W. (2011, July). Personal touches make difference in stewardship. Successful Fund Raising, 14(7), 7.
- Webster, W. (2011, July). Prospect identification key to early success in major campaign. The Major Gifts Report, 13(7), 1.
- Webster, W. (2011, June). Involving constituents in crafting your case statement. The Major Gifts Report, 13(6), 4.
- Webster, W. (2010, August). Getting started as the head of fundraising operations. The Major Gifts Report, 12(8), 4.
- Webster, W. (2010, August). Getting started as the head of fundraising operations. Successful Fund Raising, 13(8), 4.
- Served on Editorial Advisory Board for: H. Alphin Jr., J. Lavine, S. Stark, & A. Hocker (Eds.) (2016). Facilitating Higher Education Growth through Fundraising and Philanthropy (pp. 228-255). Hershey, PA: Information Science Reference. doi:10.4018/978-1-4666-9664-8
