= Sheahon Zenger =

American football player and coach, college athletics administrator

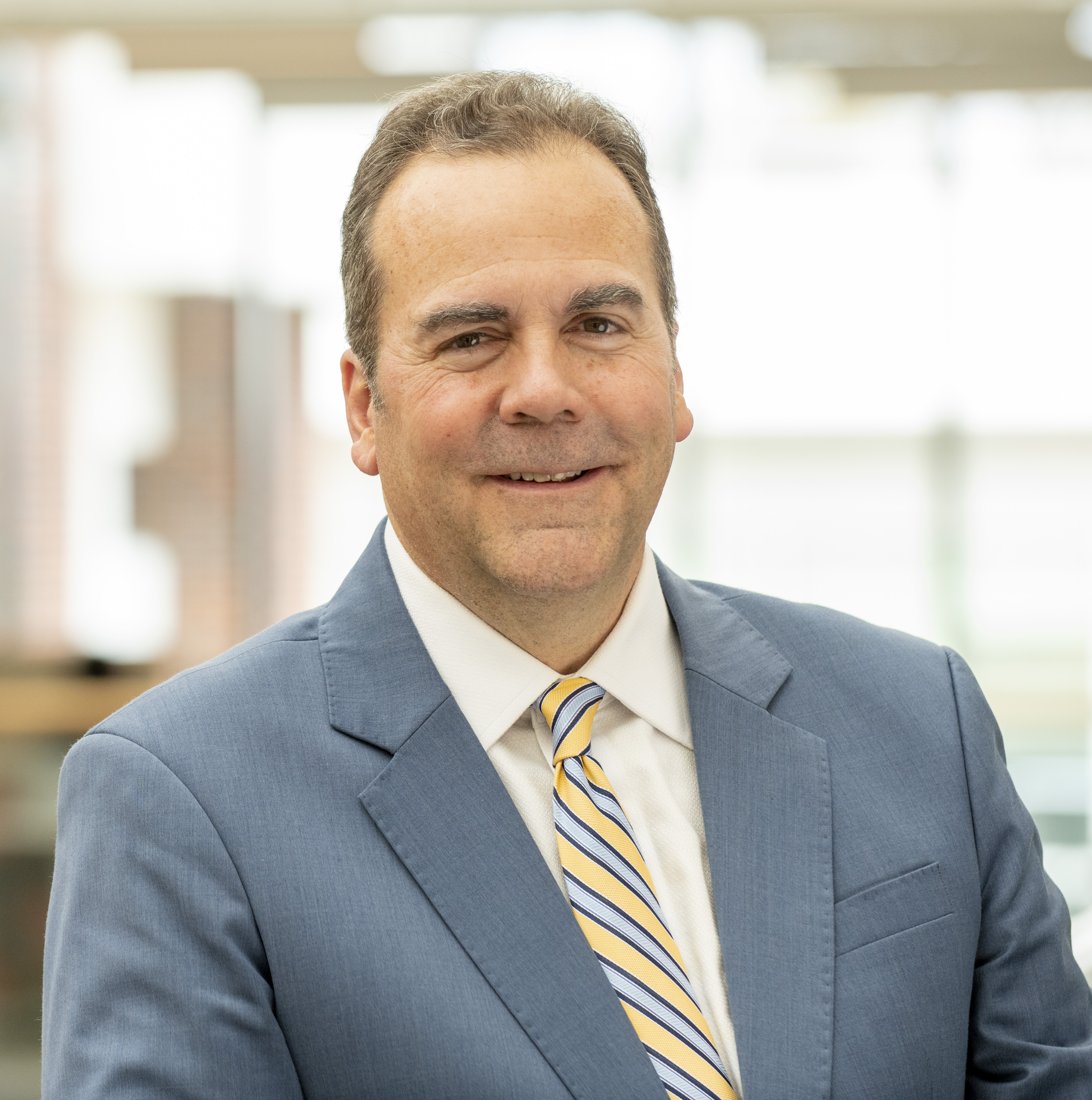
- Zenger in 2022

21st President of Illinois Wesleyan University
- Incumbent
- Assumed office July 1, 2024
- Preceded by: S. Georgia Nugent

Interim President of the University of New Haven
- In office July 1, 2022 – March 1, 2024
- Preceded by: Steven H. Kaplan
- Succeeded by: Jens Frederiksen

Personal details
- Born: Sheahon Jay Zenger; April 13, 1966 (age 60)
- Spouse: Pam
- Children: 3
- Education: Kansas State University (BA, MA); University of Kansas (PhD)

Sheahon Jay Zenger is an academic administrator currently serving as the 21st president for Illinois Wesleyan University. Earlier in his career, he held one of the highest-level athletics director positions in the nation at the University of Kansas. He also served as athletic director at Illinois State University. His recently served as the interim president at the University of New Haven.

On April 10, 2024, Zenger was named as the 21st President of Illinois Wesleyan University, effective July 1, 2024.

== Academic Administration ==
=== Illinois Wesleyan University ===
Zenger became the 21st President of Illinois Wesleyan University on July 1, 2024, following the announcement of his selection on April 10, 2024. He succeeded S. Georgia Nugent.

=== University of New Haven ===
Zenger became interim president of the University of New Haven on July 1, 2022, as part of an innovative leadership transition plan designed to build upon the university’s rich success and to position it for continued long-term growth.

=== Texas Christian University ===
Prior to joining the University of New Haven, worked closely with the chancellor at Texas Christian University.

== Athletic Administration ==
=== University of New Haven ===
Zenger was introduced as the director of athletics and recreation at the University of New Haven on September 5, 2019, succeeding former NFL head coach Chris Palmer, who retired from the school's athletic director position in June 2019. Zenger was hired to direct the university's exploration of a potential move from NCAA Division II to Division I, oversee construction of new athletic facilities, as well as guide the New Haven Department of Athletics' multi-million capital fundraising campaign for athletics.

=== University of Kansas ===
In January 2011, Zenger was named the next athletics director for the University of Kansas. One month later on February 1, 2011, Zenger officially took over the Kansas Athletics Department after the school was battling a ticket scandal from former employees. During his time at Kansas, Zenger has hired two football coaches, Charlie Weis and David Beaty in hopes to produce a winning program. Since September 2017, Zenger has spearheaded a $350 million campaign to renovate Memorial Stadium and rename it to the "David Booth Kansas Memorial Stadium", after alumnus David Booth pledged $50 million to the Athletics Department. During his tenure at Kansas the athletics department built nine new facilities. On May 21, 2018, Chancellor Girod announced a leadership change.

=== Illinois State ===
In April 2005, Zenger was named the next athletic director at Illinois State University. While at Illinois State, Zenger focused on athletes' academics increasing their grade point averages, resulting in more scholarship opportunities through donors. Zenger also contracted with Nike and multi-million dollar renovations to athletic facilities.
