= Albion College =

Private college in Albion, Michigan, US

- Former names: Wesleyan Seminary (1835–1857); Albion Female Collegiate Institute (1850–1857); The Wesleyan Seminary and Female College at Albion (1857–1861)
- Motto: Lux Fiat
- Motto in English: Let there be Light
- Type: Private liberal arts college
- Established: March 23, 1835; 191 years ago
- Religious affiliation: Not affiliated Methodist (historical)
- Academic affiliations: Annapolis Group, Oberlin Group, Council of Independent Colleges, GLCA, NAICU
- Endowment: $161.1 million (2019)
- President: Wayne Webster
- Faculty: 124 full-time 27 part-time (Fall, 2021)
- Students: 1,523 full-time 30 part-time (Fall, 2021)
- Location: Albion, Michigan, United States; 42.2445°N 84.7434°W
- Campus: small town, 574 acres (2.32 km^{2})
- Colors: Purple and Gold
- Nickname: Britons
- Sporting affiliations: NCAA Division III – MIAA
- Mascot: Brit the Briton
- Website: albion.edu
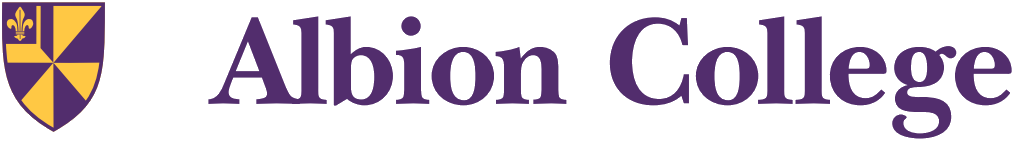

Albion College is a private liberal arts college in Albion, Michigan, United States. The college was founded in 1835, and its undergraduate population was approximately 1,500 students as of fall 2021. The college competes in NCAA Division III and the Michigan Intercollegiate Athletic Association (MIAA).

== History ==
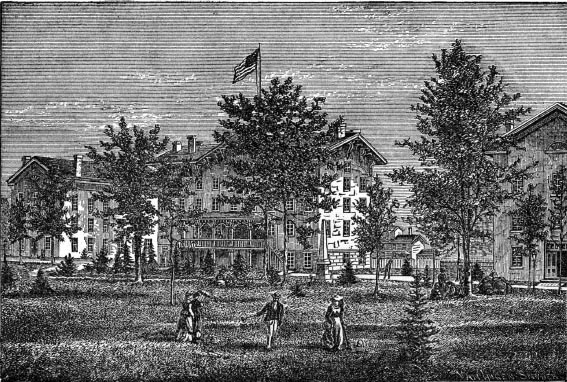
19th-century drawing of Albion College

On March 23, 1835, Methodist settlers in Spring Arbor Township obtained a charter for a new seminary from the Michigan Territorial Legislature. Construction began in 1837 outside Spring Arbor but the Panic of 1837 ended the project. A petition to move the seminary to Albion was approved by the legislature in 1839.

Sixty acres (243,000 m^{2}) of land were donated by Jesse Crowell to the renamed "Wesleyan Seminary", and construction began in 1841. The first classes were held in 1843 in the local Methodist Church. In 1844, classes began in the newly constructed Central Building, rebuilt as the present Robinson Hall in 1907.

The "Albion Female Collegiate Institute", founded in 1850, merged in 1857 under the name "The Wesleyan Seminary and Female College at Albion"; the merger was finalized in 1861, under the name "Albion College". The legislature authorized the college to confer full four-year college degrees upon both men and women that same year.

== Academics ==
Admissions statistics
- 2021 entering class
- Admit rate: 72.6 (4,983 out of 6,864)
- Yield rate: 9.2 (468 out of 4,983)

Test scores middle 50%^{[i]}
- SAT Total: 990-1230 (among 19% of FTFs)
- ACT Composite: 19-29 (among 5% of FTFs)

Albion offers bachelor's degrees in business, the humanities, fine arts, natural sciences, and social sciences. It provides study-abroad programs in Europe, Latin America, Israel, Africa, Asia, and Australia. Albion is perhaps best known for its equestrian center, the Nancy G. Held Equestrian Center, and its biology and physical education programs. The three popular first majors, by number of 2021 graduates, were Biology/Biological Sciences (43), Economics (33), and Communication (28).

The 144-acre (0.58 km^{2}) Whitehouse Nature Center at Albion works with public schools and the community. It features six miles of trails, 400 plant species, almost 170 bird species, 25 acres of oak-hickory and flood-plain forest, a tall-grass prairie and spring in the Adele D. Whitehouse Wildflower Garden, an arboretum of Michigan trees and shrubs, 34 acres of farmland and research projects, and an interpretative building.

Albion College Astronomical Observatory was built in 1883-84 with encouragement from Samuel Dickie, later the college president.

Since 1990 one student went on to be a Rhodes Scholar, three were Goldwater Scholars, four Truman Scholars and seventeen Fulbright Scholars.

== Astronomical observatory ==
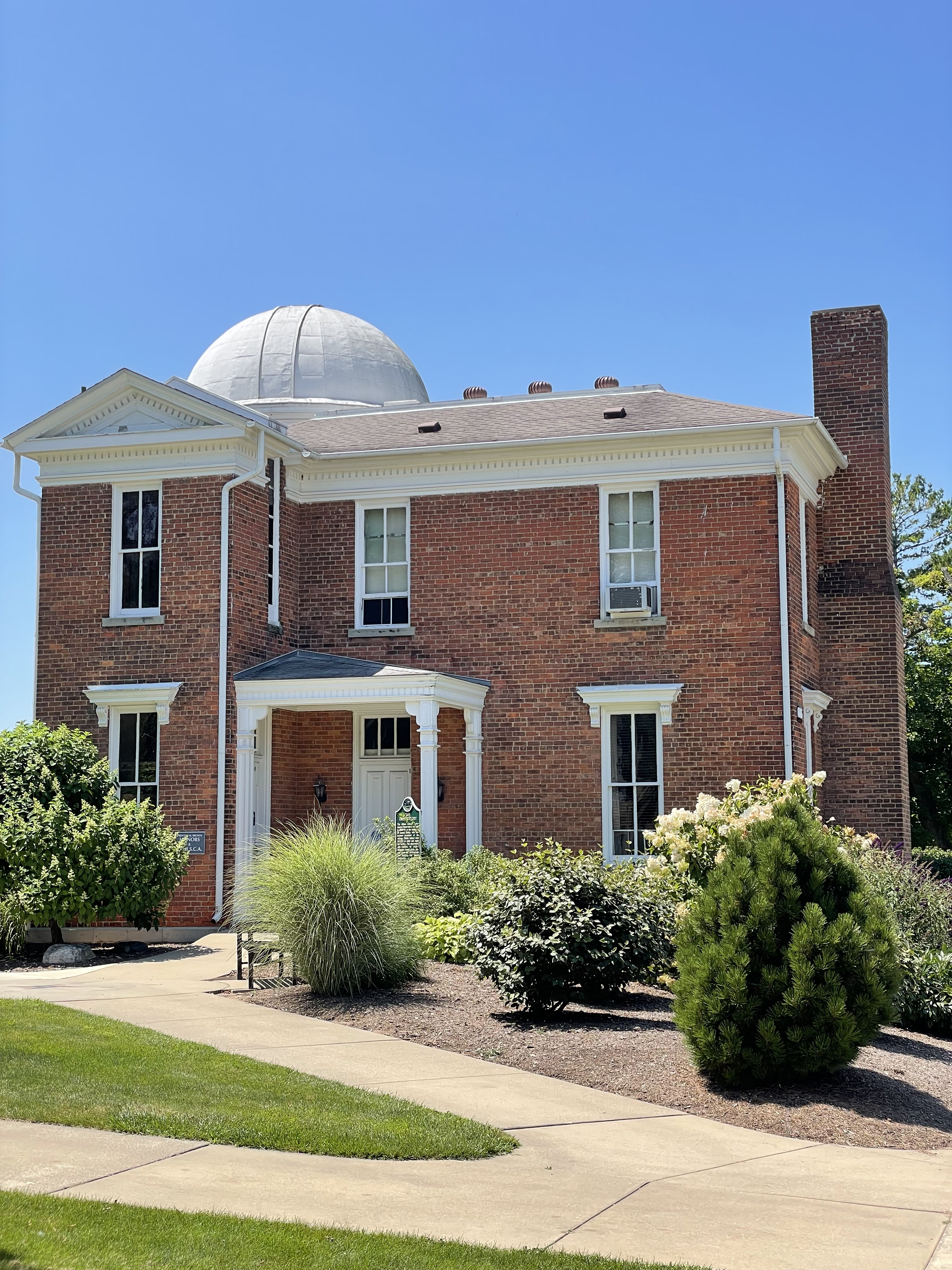
Albion College Astronomical Observatory

Albion College is home to the Prentiss M. Brown Honors Center & Astronomical Observatory, named after Prentiss M. Brown, a U.S. Senator and a U.S. Representative who graduated from Albion College in 1911. The observatory is recognized as a Michigan State Historical Site and is used for both educational purposes and public viewing events, allowing students and community members to observe celestial objects such as planets, stars, and solar events.

One of the notable features of the observatory is the 8.25" Alvan Clark Telescope, which dates back to the late 19th century. Alvan Clark & Sons were renowned telescope makers and the presence of this telescope adds historical and educational value to the observatory. According to "Old Albion", a college history published in 1909, Alvan Clark himself crafted the Albion telescope, marking it as the last telescope he made before his death. Although this claim remains unverified, Clark's health was declining in the early 1880s and the extent of his work in the years leading up to his death in 1887 is not well-documented.

== Demographics ==
As of 2021 Fall enrollment, the student body was 53% female and 47% male. 73% of students were Michigan residents, 26% from out-of-state, and 1% from foreign countries. Ninety-eight percent of students are enrolled full-time. The ethnic composition of the student body was as follows:

- White (55%)
- Black/African American (17%)
- Hispanic/Latino (12%)
- Race/Ethnicity Unknown (9%)
- Two or more Races (3%)
- Asian (2%)
- Non-resident Alien (2%)

Prior to the 2010s the enrollment was heavily white and non-low income. The numbers of black and Hispanic students increased, along with those of first-time university students and lower income students, due to a drive to increase and diversify enrollment. Between 2013 and 2020, Albion increased its minority enrollment from 18% to 41%, and 48% of the incoming class in 2020 identified as persons of color.

== Tuition and financial aid ==
The total cost of attending Albion full time as of 2022 was $67,310. Albion offers financial aid of some form to 100% of its students. The average financial aid package as of December 2022 was $53,714 per student.

== Greek life ==
Albion College is home to six social fraternities and as many sororities. All are members of the North American Interfraternity Conference and all comprise Albion College's InterFraternity Council (IFC). The song "Sweetheart of Sigma Chi" was written in 1911 by Byron D. Stokes (Albion, 1913) and F. Dudleigh Vernor (Albion, 1914), and first performed by Harry Clifford (Albion, 1911) while undergraduates at Albion College.

=== Professional and honorary fraternities ===
Albion College is also home to fifteen honorary, professional, service, and special interest fraternities, including Phi Beta Kappa, established as the Michigan Beta chapter in 1940.

== Athletics ==
Albion Britons logo

Albion athletics teams are nicknamed the Britons. The college is a member of the Michigan Intercollegiate Athletic Association (MIAA). Albion has overall won 173 men's MIAA titles (tied for 2nd overall), as well as 26 women's MIAA titles (5th overall).

Albion football won the NCAA Division III national championship in 1994.

The esports team started in the 2021-2022 academic year.

== See also ==
- Albion College Symphony Orchestra
