= J. Garber Drushal =

J. Garber Drushal (July 16, 1912 – December 3, 1982) was the eighth President of The College of Wooster. He served as president from 1967–1977.

== Life and career ==
Born in Lost Creek, Kentucky, Drushal obtained his B.A. degree from Ashland College now known as Ashland University and his Ph.D. in speech from The Ohio State University. He served as a Lieutenant in the United States Navy during World War II. He taught Speech and coached Debate at Wooster and became Dean of the Faculty in 1964 and Vice President for Academic Affairs in 1966. He became President of the college upon the death of Howard Lowry in July 1967. His tenure was marked by successful handling of campus unrest arising from protests against the Vietnam War and the Civil Rights Movement. Drushal led the college's efforts to have a more diverse faculty and student body.

== Scholarship and honors ==
Drushal published an article in The Journal of Higher Education in 1954 on independent study programs and published another in March 1968 entitled "Can the Churches Take Their Educational Responsibilities Seriously?" Drushal received an honorary doctorate from Wittenberg University in Ohio at Wittenberg's 1977 commencement ceremony. He was the president of the Ohio Communication Association from 1950 to 1951 and the executive director of the Central States Communication Association from 1950 to 1953.

Wooster has honored Drushal by creating the J. Garber Drushal Distinguished Visiting Professor Position. The position was created in 1977 by the Wooster Board of Trustees to attract a visiting professor whose achievements are of high excellence to campus.

Drushal and his wife, Dorothy, were honored by their son Mike and his wife by an endowed a scholarship at their alma mater, Ashland College. Their sons, Doug, Rich, and Mike Drushal, and Rich's son, Rick, and daughter Ali all attended Wooster.

== Publications ==
- Can the Churches Take Their Educational Responsibilities Seriously?: Review Essays. Reviewed Work(s): Church-Sponsored Higher Education in the United States: Report of the Danforth Commission by Manning M. Pattillo Jr., Donald M. Mackenzie. Review author[s]: Charles S. McCoy, E. M. O'Byrne, J. Garber Drushal. The Journal of Higher Education, Vol. 39, No. 3 (March, 1968), pp. 169–176

With Robert H. Bonthius and F. James Davis, Drushal authored The Independent Study Program in the United States. (Columbia University Press, 1957)
