= Anne E. McCall =

Academic administrator and literary scholar

Anne McCall

13th President of the College of Wooster
- Incumbent
- Assumed office July 1, 2023
- Preceded by: Sarah Bolton; Wayne Webster (interim)

Personal details
- Born: Washington, D.C., U.S.
- Education: University of Virginia (BA); University of Strasbourg (PhD)

Anne McCall is an academic administrator and literary scholar who currently serves as the College of Wooster's 13th president. She is the former senior vice president for academic affairs and provost at Xavier University of Louisiana. She was also an associate dean at Tulane University. McCall's research focuses on nineteenth-century French literature, with a specialization in the works of author George Sand. McCall took office in July 2023 as the 13th president of the College of Wooster.

== Early life and education ==
McCall received her BA in French and German from the University of Virginia. She earned her PhD in literature from the University of Strasbourg.

== Selected publications ==
- Anne E. McCall. "The Bibliothèque Nationale and Cultural Productions of Scholarship." South Central Review. 29:3. Special Issue: Cultural Production in Nineteenth Century France: A Tribute to Lawrence R. Schehr (Fall 2012): 47–62. doi:10.1353/scr.2012.0025
- Anne E. McCall. "Still Life and Fetal Exploits in Flora Tristan’s Pérégrinations d’une paria." The Romantic Review 98 (2007): 83–101. doi:10.1215/26885220-98.1.83
- Anne E. McCall. "George Sand and the Genealogy of Terror." L'Esprit Créateur 35:4 (Winter 1995): 38–48. doi:10.1353/esp.1995.0042
