= Sarah Bolton (physicist) =

American physicist and academic administrator

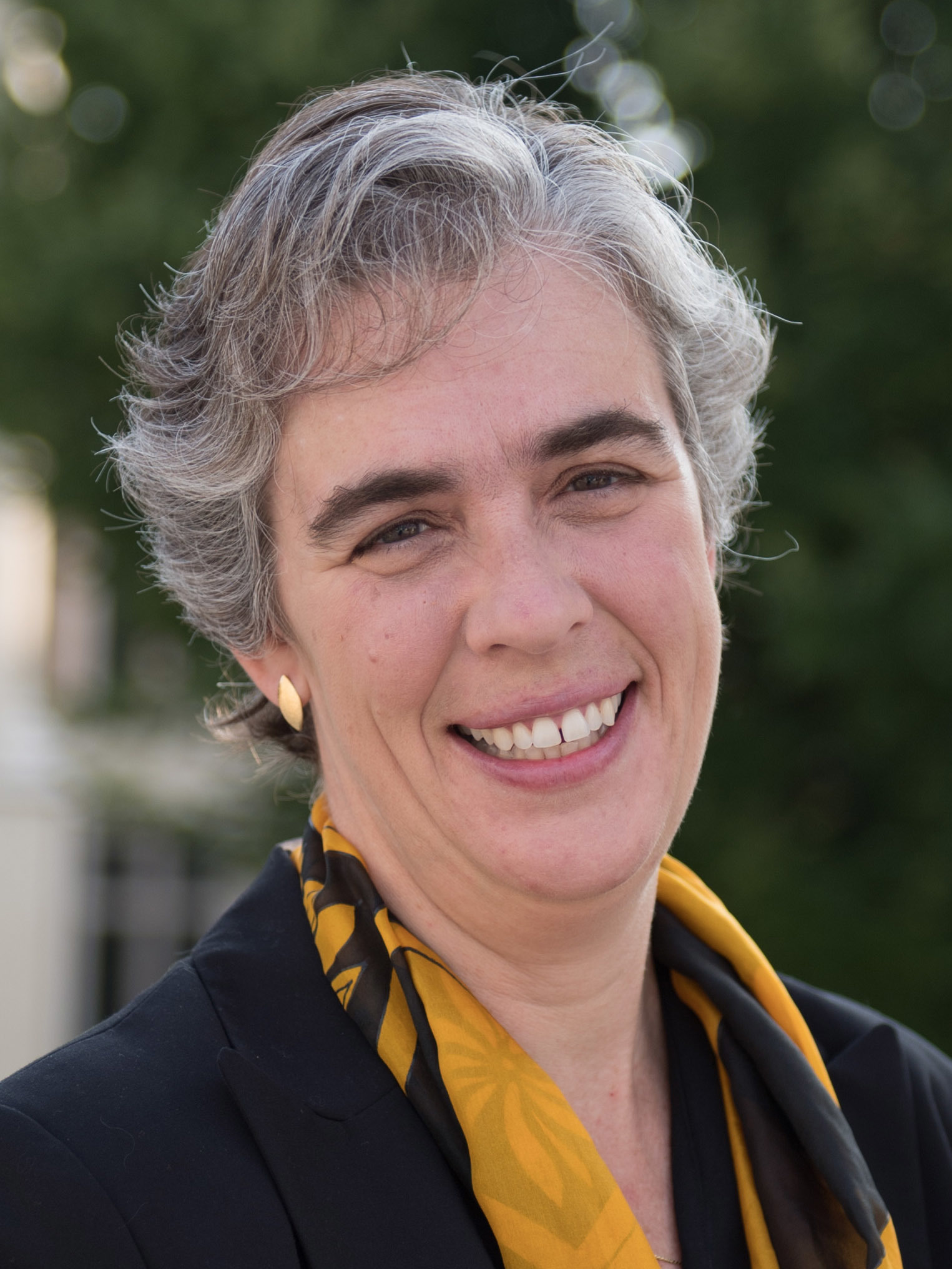
- Sarah Bolton in 2016

15th President of Whitman College
- Incumbent
- Assumed office July 1, 2022
- Preceded by: Kathleen M. Murray

12th President of the College of Wooster
- In office July 1, 2016 – July 1, 2022
- Preceded by: Grant Cornwell; S. Georgia Nugent (interim)
- Succeeded by: Wayne Webster (interim); Anne McCall

Personal details
- Education: Brown University (BS); University of California, Berkeley (MS, PhD)
- Scientific career
- Fields: Physics
- Workplaces: Williams College; College of Wooster; Whitman College
- Thesis: Dimensionality dependence of indium gallium arsenide nonlinear optical response (1996)
- Doctoral advisor: Daniel S. Chemla

Sarah Ruth Bolton is an American physicist and university administrator who currently serves as the president of Whitman College in Walla Walla, Washington. She assumed this position on July 1, 2022, and was previously the first woman to serve as the College of Wooster's president in a permanent capacity. Bolton has been a strong supporter of Dreamers, students who are undocumented but born in the United States, Posse scholars, a program to "empower diverse groups of leaders who transform communities, this country and the world," and international students, especially when many could not return home during the COVID-19 pandemic.

Prior to her tenure at Whitman, Bolton was president of the College of Wooster in Wooster, Ohio from 2016 to 2022, as well as dean and professor of physics at Williams College in Williamstown, Massachusetts from 1995 to 2016.

== Education ==
Bolton earned her B.S. in physics and biophysics from Brown University in 1988, and her master's degree and Ph.D. from the University of California, Berkeley, also in physics. Her doctoral thesis is entitled "Dimensionality dependence of indium gallium arsenide nonlinear optical response."

== Career ==
Bolton served as president of the College of Wooster until 2022. Her efforts toward the college's Diversity, Equity, and Inclusion program saw the rise of Wooster to be the most internationally diverse college in Ohio. 17 percent of students enrolled in Wooster are international students, coming from 68 countries as of the date she left.

Bolton came to Williams College as an assistant professor of physics in 1995, was promoted to associate professor in 2001, and full professor in 2007. She served as chair of the physics department from 2007 to 2010. She won Williams College's Outstanding Mentor Award for Fostering Inclusive Academic Excellence in 2009.

Bolton served for more than two decades as dean of the college and professor of physics at Williams College in Williamstown, Massachusetts. As dean of the college at Williams, Bolton supervised academic advising and supported programs such as off-campus study, international student services, and the registrar's office. She was also active in creating policies and procedures for sexual assault prevention and response. In addition, she worked on projects addressing first-generation college students, and on efforts toward equity and inclusion on Williams’ campus.

=== Research and scholarship ===
Bolton's research and scholarship explores the properties of novel, nanostructured materials, which have features made up of only a few atomic layers. She uses ultrafast pulsed lasers to investigate the ways that energy is transferred in these quantum mechanical systems. She has published in physics journals such as Physical Review A and Physical Review B. Additionally, she has many publications on similar subjects in experimental, material, solid state, optical, quantum, molecular, bio, and plasma physics.
