= Grant Cornwell =

Grant H. Cornwell Jr.
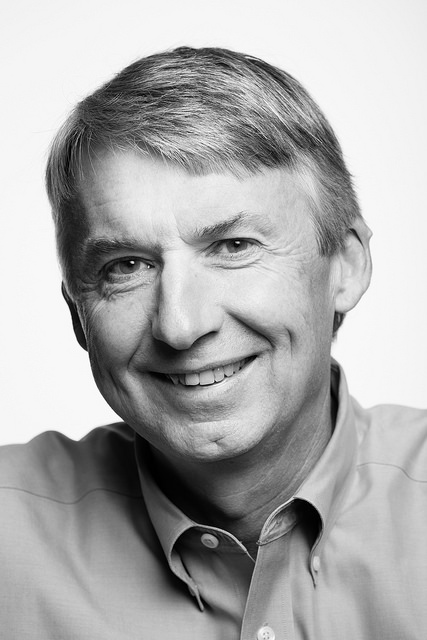

15th President of Rollins College
- In office July 2015 – July 2025
- Preceded by: Lewis M. Duncan
- Succeeded by: Brooke Barnett

11th President of The College of Wooster
- In office July 2007 – June 2015
- Preceded by: R. Stanton Hales
- Succeeded by: Sarah Bolton

Personal details
- Education: St. Lawrence University (BA); University of Chicago (MA, PhD)
- Website: Office of the President

Grant Cornwell is an American educator, academic, and liberal education advocate. He served as the 15th president of Rollins College in Winter Park, Florida, from 2015 to 2025, following his role as president of the College of Wooster in Ohio. Previously, he was vice president and professor of philosophy at St. Lawrence University in Canton, New York.

== Scholarship ==
Cornwell's scholarship and teaching lie in the areas of human rights, globalization, and liberal education. He has authored numerous scholarly articles and his works have been cited in hundreds of publications.

Cornwell is co-editor of two books: Global Multiculturalism: Comparative Perspectives on Ethnicity, Race, and Nation and Democratic Education in an Age of Difference: Redefining Citizenship in Higher Education. He is the author of Sugar Estates of St. Kitts: a Photo Essay of Plantation Heritage Sites.

== Advocacy ==
Cornwell has been involved with a number of initiatives and leadership groups in higher education. He is a past board member of the National Association of Independent Colleges and Universities and the Association of American Colleges and Universities. Cornwell has also served on the Council on Foreign Relations’ Global Literacy Advisory Board and the American Council on Education’s Commission on International Initiatives.

== Education ==
Cornwell received his B.A. in philosophy and biology from St. Lawrence University and his masters and Ph.D., also in philosophy, from the University of Chicago. He received an honorary Doctor of Humane Letters from College of Wooster in 2017, and a second from St. Lawrence University in 2022.
