= Walter Leckrone =

American newspaper editor and sports coach (1897–1964)

Biographical details
- Born: June 2, 1897; Glenford, Ohio, U.S.
- Died: November 24, 1964 (aged 67); Logan, Ohio, U.S.
- Education: Ashland (1922)

Coaching career (HC unless noted)

Football
- 1920: Ashland

Basketball
- 1920–1921: Ashland

Head coaching record
- Overall: 1–2 (football); 5–3 (basketball)

Walter Leckrone (June 2, 1897 – November 24, 1964) was an American newspaper editor. He was also an American football and college basketball coach.

== Ashland College ==
Leckron served as the head football coach (1920) and head men's basketball coach at Ashland University in Ashland, Ohio.

== News career ==
Leckrone worked as a newspaper editor at several outlets in the Midwest. Those included The Toledo News-Bee (1936–1938), the Cleveland Press (1938–1942), and the Indianapolis Times (1942–1960).
