= Sean M. Decatur =

American chemist (born 1968)

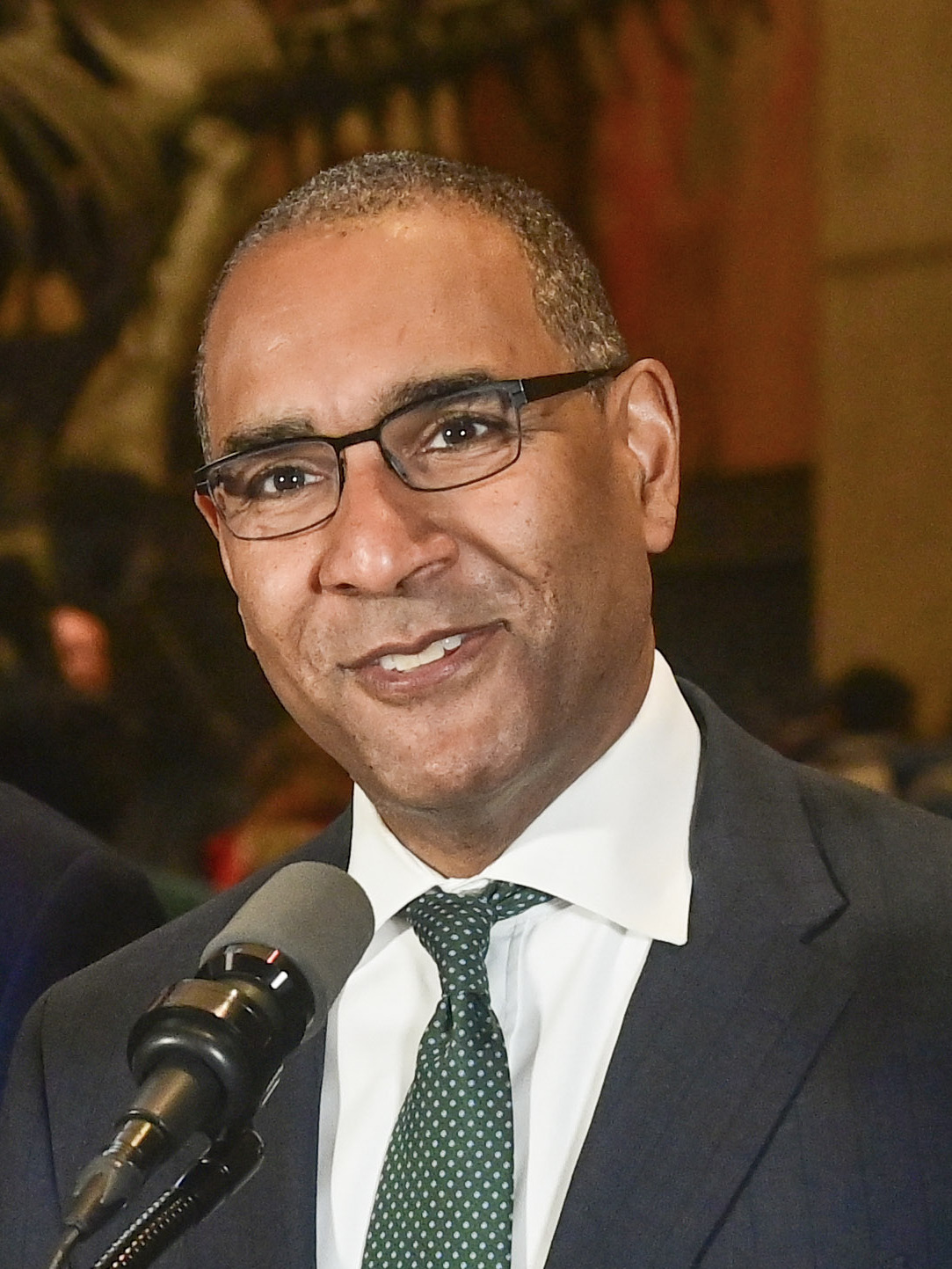
- Decatur in 2025

President of the American Museum of Natural History
- Incumbent
- Assumed office December 2022

President of Kenyon College
- In office 2013–2022
- Preceded by: Susan Georgia Nugent
- Succeeded by: Julie Kornfeld

Personal details
- Born: September 4, 1968 (age 57) Cleveland, Ohio, U.S.
- Spouse: Renee Romano
- Children: 2
- Awards: Fellow of the American Association for the Advancement of Science
- Scientific career
- Education: Swarthmore College (BA); Stanford University (PhD)
- Fields: Biophysical chemistry
- Workplaces: Kenyon College
- Thesis: Novel strategies for probing structure-function relationships in myoglobin (1995)

Sean M. Decatur (born September 4, 1968) is an American chemist and college administrator who has served as the president of the American Museum of Natural History since April 2023. Decatur is the first African-American to serve as the museum's president. Prior to this, he was president of Kenyon College from 2013 to 2022.

== Early life and education ==
Decatur is a native of the Cleveland, Ohio, area. His mother was a public school teacher of mathematics and science. He attended Cleveland public schools and the Hawken School. He earned a bachelor's degree at Swarthmore College in 1990 and a Ph.D. in biophysical chemistry from Stanford University in 1995.

== Career ==
Decatur taught at Mount Holyoke College from 1995 to 2008. He served as an assistant professor of chemistry, then an associate professor of chemistry, and served as department chair from 2001 to 2004. In 2005, he was appointed the Marilyn Dawson Sarles Professor of Life Sciences. He was also an associate dean of faculty for science from 2005 to 2008.

Decatur was a visiting scientist at the Massachusetts Institute of Technology in 2004 to 2005. From 2008 to 2013, he served as dean of the College of Arts and Sciences at Oberlin College. In 2013, he was named president of Kenyon College.

During his final years at Kenyon College, Decatur faced challenges related both to labor organizing and transgender rights. From 2020 to 2022, students expressed concern over the college not recognizing a student worker labor union. In 2022, students demanded that the college publicly support a transgender staff member, Rhea Debussy, who was receiving transphobic threats. When a statement was not issued, students delivered a list of demands to Decatur's office. Following this, a transgender student then wrote an open letter to Decatur and the college community.

== Personal life ==
Decatur is married to Renee Romano, professor of history and Comparative American studies at Oberlin College. They have two children, Sabine and Owen.

== Selected works ==
Op-ed pieces on higher education

- “The Winner – A Liberal Education,” New York Times Room for Debate, January 24, 2011
- “It’s about fit, not data,” New York Times Room for Debate, March 31, 2011
- “Education on iTunes?” New York Times Room for Debate, September 5, 2011
- “Online Courses Enhance, But Don’t Replace College,” New York Times Room for Debate, May 6, 2012
- “Student Evaluations of Teaching: An Insightful Process That Could Be Improved,” New York Times Room for Debate, September 17, 2012
- “Rankings Can Be Useful, But Also Dangerous,” New York Times Room for Debate, September 26, 2012
- "The Higher Value of Higher Education In Addressing Sexual Violence," Huffington Post, July 5, 2016
- "What Leopoldo López Teaches Us About the Liberal Arts," Huffington Post, July 10, 2017
- "Don’t be misled by the campus free speech debate. Colleges are listening — and engaging with neighbors," The Washington Post, August 22, 2018

Scholarly articles–published

- Moran, S.D., Woys, A.M., Buchanan, L.E., Bixby, E., Decatur, S.M., and Zanni, M.T. (2012) “Twodimensional IR Spectroscopy and Segmental 13C Labeling reveals the Domain Structure of Human γδ-crystallin amyloid fibrils,” Proceedings of the National Academy of Sciences USA 109: 3329–3334.
- Inouye, H., Gleason, K.A., Decatur, S.M., Kirschner, D.A. (2010) “Differential effects of Phe19 and Phe20 on fibril formation by amyloidogenic peptide Aβ16-22 (Ac-KLVFFAE-NH2),” Proteins: Structure, Function, and Bioinformatics 78: 2306–2321.
- Measey, T.J., Smith, K.B., Decatur, S.M., Zhao, L., Yang, G., and Schwietzer-Stenner, R. (2009) “Self -aggregation of a polyalanine octamer promoted by its C-terminal tyrosine and probed by a strongly enhanced vibrational circular dichroism signal,” J. Am. Chem. Soc. 131: 18218–18219.
- Davis, M.F., Gracz, H., Vendeix, F.A., de Serrano, V., Somasundaram, A., Decatur, S.M., Franzen, S. (2009) “Different modes of binding of mono-, di-, and trihalohenated phenols to the hemoglobin dehaloperozidase from Amphrite Ornata,” Biochemistry 48: 2164–2172.
- Inouye, H., Gross, A.A.R., Hidalgo, M.M., Gleason, K.A., Abdelsayed, G.A., Castillo, G.M., Snow, A.D., Pozo Ramajo, A., Petty, S.A., Decatur, S.M., and Kirschner, D.A. (2008) “Fiber Difraction as a Screen for Amyloid Inhibitors,” Current Alzheimer’s Research 5: 288 - 307.
- Papanikolopoulou, K., Mills-Henry, I, Thol, S.L., Wang, Y., Gross, A. R., Kirschner, D.A., Decatur, S. M., King, J. (2008). “Formation of Amyloid Fibrils in Vitro by Human γd-crystallin and its Isolated Domains,” Molecular Vision 14:81-89.
- Decatur, S.M. (2006) “Elucidation of residue-level structure and dynamics of polypeptides via isotopeedited infrared spectroscopy,” Accounts of Chemical Research 39:169-175.
- Petty, S.A. and Decatur, S.M. (2005) “Experimental Evidence for the Reorganization of β-Strands within Aggregates of the Aβ (16-22) Peptide,” The Journal of the American Chemical Society 127: 13488–13489.
- Pozo Ramajo, A., Petty, S.A., Starzyk, A., Decatur, S.M., and Volk, M. (2005) “The α-Helix Folds More Rapidly at the C-Terminus Than at the N-Terminus,” The Journal of the American Chemical Society. 127: 13784 – 13785.
- Petty, S.A. and Decatur, S.M. (2005) “Intersheet rearrangement of polypeptides during nucleation of β-sheet aggregates,” Proceedings of the National Academy of Sciences USA 102: 14272–14277.
- Petty, S.A., Adalsteinsson, T., and Decatur, S.M. (2005) “Correlations between morphology, β-sheet stability, and molecular structure in prion peptide aggregates,” Biochemistry,44: 4720 – 4726.
- Starzyk, A., Barber-Armstrong, W., Sridharan, M., Decatur, S.M. (2005) "Spectroscopic Evidence for Desolvation of Helical Peptides by 2,2,2-trifluoroethanol," Biochemistry, 44: 369–376.
- Fang, C., Wang, J., Kim, Y.S., Charnley, A.K., Smith III, A.B., Barber-Armstrong, W., Decatur, S.M., and Hochstrasser, R.M. (2004) “Two Dimensional Infrared Spectroscopy of Isotopomers of an Alaninerich α−helix,” Journal of Physical Chemistry B, 108: 10415–10427.
- Huang, R., Kubelka, J., Barber-Armstrong, W., Silva, R.A.G.D., Decatur, S.M., and Keiderling, T.A. (2004) “The Nature of Vibrational Coupling in Helical Peptides: An Isotope-Labeling Study,” The Journal of the American Chemical Society, 126: 2339 - 2345.
- Barber-Armstrong, W., *Donaldson, T., *Wijesooriya, H., Silva, R.A.G.D. and Decatur, S.M. (2004) “Empirical Relationships Between Isotope-Edited IR Spectra and Helix Geometry,” The Journal of the American Chemical Society, 126: 2346 - 2354.
- Fang, C., Wang, J., Charnley, A.K., Smith III, A.B., Barber-Armstong, W., Decatur, S.M., and Hochstrasser, R.M. (2003) “Two dimensional infrared measurements of the coupling of the amide modes of an alpha helix,” Chemical Physics Letters 382: 586–592.
- Silva, R.A.G.D., W. Barber-Armstrong and Decatur, S.M. (2003) “The Organization and Assembly of a β-sheet Formed by a Prion Peptide in Solution: An Isotope-Edited FTIR Study,” The Journal of the American Chemical Society 125: 13674–13675.
- Silva, R.A.G.D., *Nguyen, J.Y., and Decatur, S.M. (2002) “Probing the Effects of Side Chains on the Conformation and Stability of Helical Peptides via Isotope-Edited Infrared Spectroscopy,” Biochemistry 41, 15296–15303.
- Kubelka, J., Bour, P., Silva, R.A.G.D., Decatur, S.M., and Keiderling, T.A. (2002) " Chirality in Peptide Vibrations: Ab Initio Computational Studies of Length, Solvation, Hydrogen Bond, Dipole Coupling, and Isotope Effects on Vibrational CD," The Physical Chemistry of Chirality, edited by J. Hicks (ACS Symposium Series 810, Oxford University Press), p. 50-64.
- Barber-Armstrong, W., *Sridharan, M., and Decatur, S.M. (2001) “Stabilization of Helical Conformation in Model Peptides by 2,2,2-Trifluoroethanol: An FTIR Study,” Peptides: The Wave of the Future, edited by M. Lebl and R. Houghten (Kluwer/Escom Press), pp. 367–368.
- Monteiro, K., Barber-Armstrong, W., and Decatur, S.M. (2001) “Amide I Frequency as a Probe of Tertiary Structure: FTIR Studies of Helix Bundle Peptides,” Peptides: The Wave of the Future, edited by M. Lebl and R. Houghten (Kluwer/Escom Press), pp. 295–296.
- Zanni, M.T., Asplund, M.C., Decatur, S.M. and Hochstrasser, R.M. (2001), "Frequency resolved and heterodyned femtosecond infrared echoes of peptides; multiple pulse coherent vibrational analogues of NMR," Ultrafast Phenomena XII, edited by T. Elsaesser et al., Springer Series Chem. Phys. 66, 504.
- Silva, R.A.G.D., Kubelka, J., Bour, P., Decatur, S.M., and Keiderling, T.A. (2000) "Site-Specific Conformational Determination in Thermal Unfolding Studies of Helical Peptides Using Vibrational Circular Dichroism with Isotopic Substitution," The Proceedings of the National Academy of Sciences USA 97, 8318–8323.
- Decatur, S.M., Keiderling, T.A., Silva, R.A.G.D., and Bour, P. (2000) "Analysis of Local Conformation within Helical Peptides via Isotope-Edited Vibrational Spectroscopy" Peptides for the New Millennium, edited by G. Fields and G. Barany (Kluwer/Escom Press), p. 414.
- Decatur, S.M. (2000) "Infrared Spectroscopy of Isotopically Labeled Helical Peptides: Probing the Effects on N-Acetylation on Helix Stability," Biopolymers 54, 180–185.
- Decatur, S.M. and *Antonic, J. (1999) “Isotope-Edited Infrared Spectroscopy of Helical Peptides” The Journal of the American Chemical Society 121, 11914–11915.
- Decatur, S. M., *Belcher, K. L., Rickert, P. K., Franzen, S., and Boxer, S. G. (1999) “Hydrogen Bonding Modulates Proximal Ligand Binding in Sperm Whale Myoglobin Mutants” Biochemistry 38:11086-92.
- Decatur, S.M., Franzen, S., DePillis, G.D., Dyer, R.B., Woodruff, W. and Boxer, S.G. (1996) “Trans Effects in Nitric Oxide Binding to Myoglobin Cavity Mutant H93G," Biochemistry 35, 4939–4944.
- Decatur, S.M., DePillis, G.D., and Boxer, S.G. (1996) “Modulation of Protein Function by Exogenous Ligands in Protein Cavities: CO Binding to a Myoglobin Cavity Mutant Containing Unnatural Proximal Ligands,” Biochemistry 35, 3925–3922.
- Hill, J.R., Dlott, D.D., Rella, C.W., Peterson, K.A., Decatur, S.M., Boxer, S.G., and Fayer, M.D. (1996) "Vibrational Dynamics of Carbon Monoxide at the Active Sites of Mutant Heme Proteins," J. Phys. Chem 29, 12100–12107.
- Decatur, S.M. and Boxer, S.G. (1995) "A Test of the Role of Electrostatics in Determining the CO Stretch Frequency in Carbonmonoxymyoglobin" Biochemical and Biophysical Research Communications 212, 159–164.
- Decatur, S.M. and Boxer, S.G. (1995) "1H NMR Characterization of Myoglobins Where Exogenous Imidazoles Replace the Proximal Histidine" Biochemistry 34, 2122–2129.
- DePillis, G.D., Decatur, S.M., Barrick, D. and Boxer, S.G. (1994) "Function Cavities in Proteins: A General Method for Proximal Ligand Substitution in Myoglobin" The Journal of the American Chemical Society 116, 6981–6982.
- Lambright, D.G., Balasubramanian, S., Decatur, S.M. and Boxer, S.G. (1994) "The Anatomy of a Ligand Binding Pathway: The Roles of Arg45, His64, and Val68" Biochemistry 33, 5518–5525.
