= College of Wooster =

Private liberal arts college in Wooster, Ohio, US

Coordinates: 40°48′42″N 81°56′08″W

The College of Wooster
- Former name: University of Wooster (1866–1915)
- Motto: Ex Uno Fonte / Independent Minds, Working Together
- Type: Private liberal arts college
- Established: 1866; 160 years ago
- Accreditation: Higher Learning Commission
- Academic affiliations: Annapolis Group
- Endowment: $437 million (2024)
- President: Anne E. McCall
- Faculty: 202 (fall 2023)
- Students: 1,876 (fall 2023)
- Location: Wooster, Ohio, 44691, U.S.
- Campus: Suburban, 240 acres (97 ha)
- Language: English
- Colors: Gold & black
- Nickname: Fighting Scots
- Sporting affiliations: NCAA Division III — NCAC
- Mascot: Scottie Dog
- Website: wooster.edu
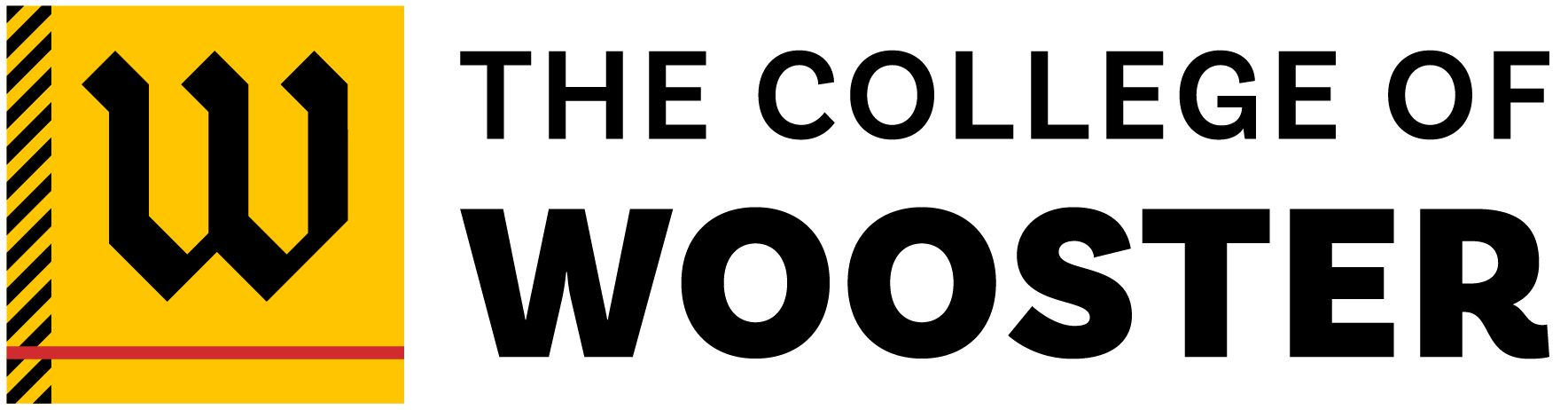
- College of Wooster
- U.S. National Register of Historic Places
- U.S. Historic district
- Built: 1900
- Architect: Lansing C. Holden
- Architectural style: Late Gothic Revival, Collegiate Gothic, other
- NRHP reference No.: 80003246
- Added to NRHP: February 25, 1980

The College of Wooster is a private liberal arts college in Wooster, Ohio, United States. Founded in 1866 by the Presbyterian Church as the University of Wooster, it has been officially non-sectarian since 1969. From its creation, the college has been a co-educational institution. It enrolls about 1,800 students and is a member of the Five Colleges of Ohio, Great Lakes Colleges Association, and Association of Presbyterian Colleges and Universities.

== History ==
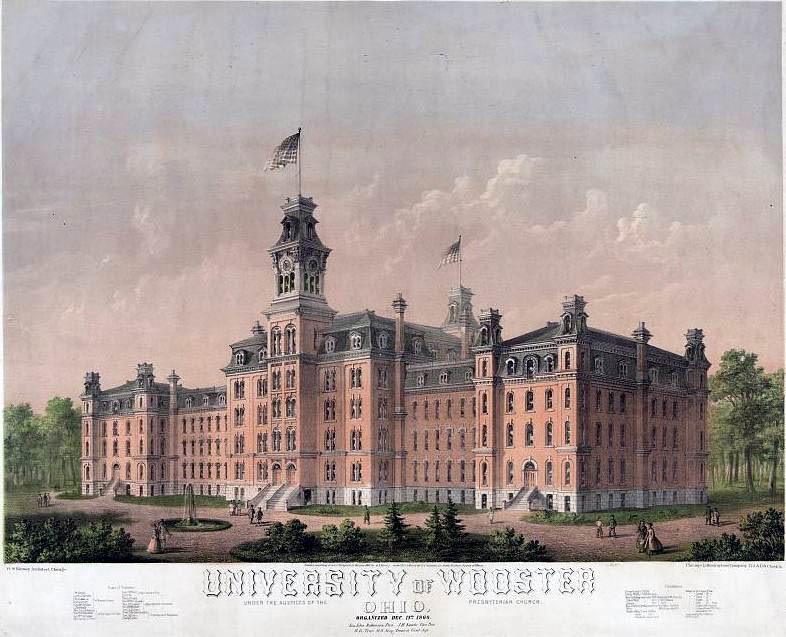
University of Wooster, lithograph, c. 1867

Founded as the University of Wooster in 1866 by the Presbyterian Synod of Ohio, the institution opened its doors in 1870 with a faculty of five and a student body of thirty men and four women. Ephraim Quinby, a Wooster citizen, donated the first 20 acres (8.1 ha), a large oak grove situated on a hilltop overlooking the town. After being founded with the intent to make Wooster open to everyone, the university's first Ph.D. was granted to a woman, Annie B. Irish, in 1882. The first black student, Clarence Allen, began his studies later in the same decade.

The university gradually began to define itself as a liberal arts institution. In 1915, after a bitter dispute between the faculty and the trustees, the institution was renamed The College of Wooster reflecting a dedication to the education of undergraduate students in the liberal arts. The college developed under the presidency of Charles F. Wishart, 1919–1944. During the Fundamentalist–Modernist Controversy in the 1920s, prominent Presbyterian layman and former United States Secretary of State William Jennings Bryan attacked the college for its teaching of evolution. The subject had been taught at the college for several decades and defended by president Wishart. Bryan called for the general assembly of the church to cut off funding to the college. In 1923, Wishart defeated Bryan for the position of Moderator of the General Assembly, largely on the evolution issue, and the college continued to teach evolution. Wishart was followed by Howard F. Lowry, who served from 1944 until his death in 1967. He was followed by J. Garber Drushal, who served until 1977.

On November 10, 2015, the college named Sarah Bolton as its twelfth president and first female president. Bolton left the college at the end of the 2021–2022 academic year to assume the presidency of Whitman College. Anne E. McCall was inaugurated on October 28, 2023.

=== Scottish heritage ===
Wooster's school colors are black and old gold and its mascot is the 'Fighting Scot'. Early Wooster teams were known as the Presbyterians or unofficially as the 'Presbyterian Steamroller.' In 1939, a large donation from alumnus Birt Babcock funded the purchase of kilts for the marching band, in the yellow-and-black MacLeod tartan (MacLeod of Lewis), which had no particular significance, except that it matched the school colors. Scottish culture became an important part of the school's heritage; today, the football games feature a Scottish pipe band with Highland dancers in addition to a traditional marching band, with all three groups clad in the MacLeod tartan. The college offers the "Scottish Arts Scholarship" for students who perform as pipers, drummers, or Scottish dancers.

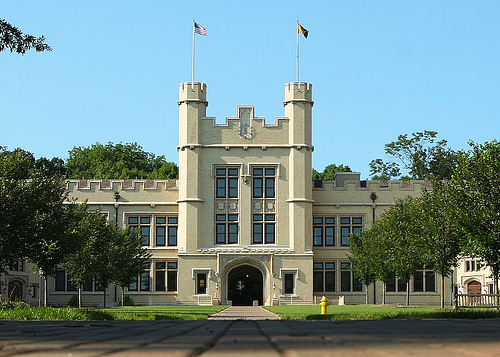
Kauke Hall, an iconic building on the college's campus

=== Presidents ===
Wooster has had fifteen presidents from 1870 to 2024, including interim presidents.

- Anne E. McCall 2023-
- Wayne P. Webster 2022–2023
- Sarah R. Bolton 2016–2022
- Georgia Nugent 2015–2016
- Grant Cornwell Jr 2007–2015
- Raleigh Stanton Hales Jr. 1995–2007
- Henry Jefferson Copeland 1977–1995
- J. Garber Drushal 1967–1977
- Howard Foster Lowry 1944–1967
- Charles Frederick Wishart 1919–1944
- John Campbell White 1915–1919
- Louis Edward Holden 1899–1915
- Sylvester Fithian Scovel 1883–1899
- Archibald Alexander Edward Taylor 1873–1883
- Willis Lord 1870 -1873

=== Organization and administration ===
The College of Wooster Board of Trustees named Anne E. McCall to be the 13th president of the College of Wooster on December 8, 2022.

== Academics ==
Academic rankings

Liberal arts
- U.S. News & World Report: 77
- Washington Monthly: 103

National
- Forbes: 250
- WSJ/College Pulse: 143

Wooster's most popular majors, by 2024 graduates, were Political Science (41), Psychology (34), and Biology (31).

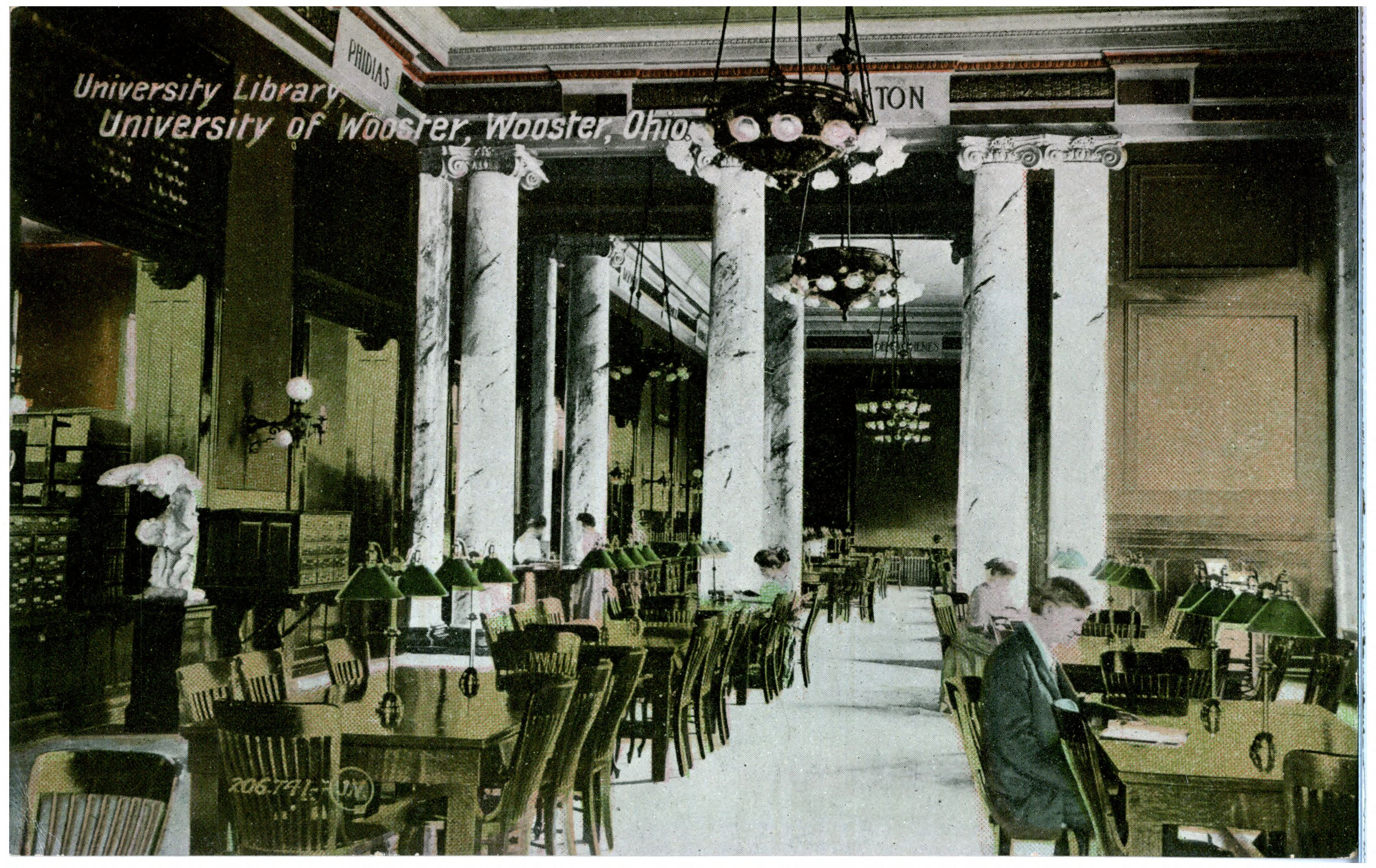
1911 depiction of the Timken Library, then known as the University Library

=== Libraries ===
The College of Wooster Libraries consists of three branches (Andrews Library, Flo K. Gault Library, and Timken Science Library) and a music library located at the Scheide Music Center. Andrews Library, the largest library in the system, houses more than 850,000 volumes and can accommodate over 500 readers. Andrews Library houses the college's Special Collections, media library, and the student writing center.

=== Art museum ===
The College of Wooster Art Museum was established in the 1930s. The current museum was established at the Ebert Art Center in 1997. The museum houses two small galleries, the Charlene Derge Sussel Art Gallery and the Burton D. Morgan Gallery.

The museum's collection spans from ancient to contemporary art. Permanent collections include the John Taylor Arms Print Collection—which represents works by Edward Hopper, Winslow Homer, Isabel Bishop, Martin Lewis, James Abbott McNeill Whistler, Albrecht Dürer, Käthe Kollwitz and Félix Bracquemond—the William C. Mithoefer Collection of African Art, Middle Eastern pottery and Chinese decorative art.

== Student life ==
=== Residential life ===
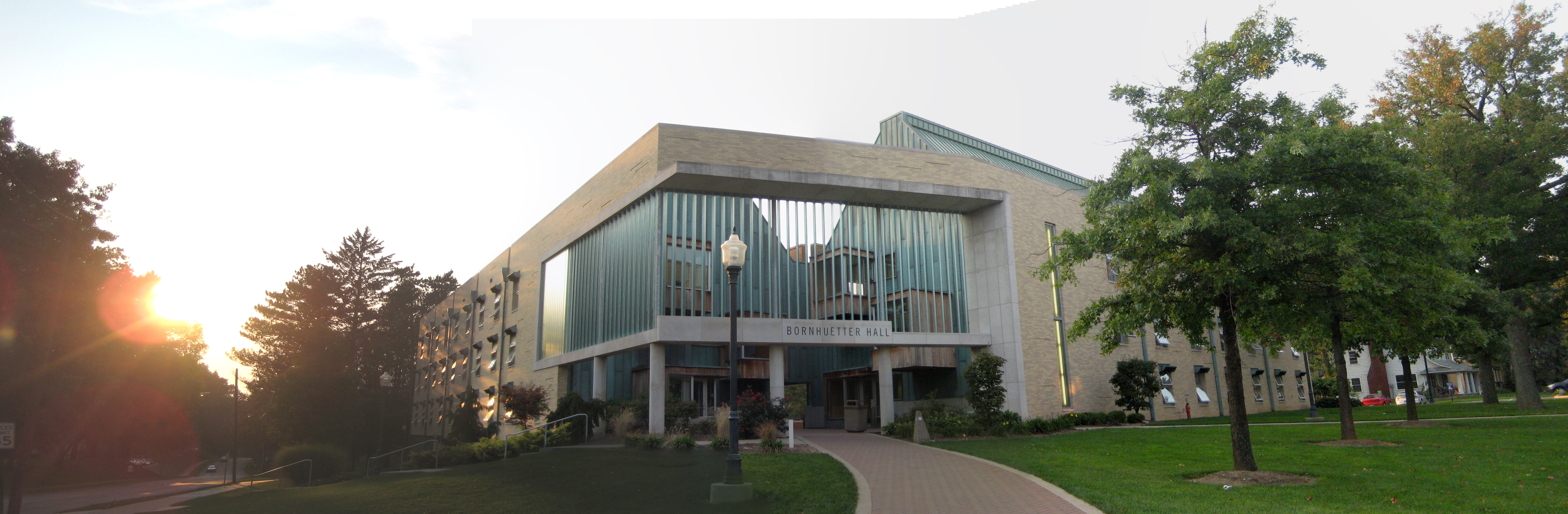
Bornhuetter Hall, one of the college's residence halls

The College of Wooster is primarily a residential campus. It has 14 residence halls, divided into First Year Housing and Upperclass Housing; Douglass Hall is the only residence to contain both. Upperclass Housing also includes smaller, non-Hall residences such as Miller Manor and Westminster Cottage. All-gender housing is offered, as is Greek life and language housing; however, these all share space with general housing.

The number of students in each varies significantly, but as of 2026, 98% of the student body live in the residence halls on campus. 20 program houses are also offered.

=== International presence ===
Elias Compton, former dean of the college, founded the Wooster in India program during the 1930s, which established a sister school relationship with Ewing Christian College in Allahabad, India. Over a forty-year time span, Wooster sent several former students to serve as Head Resident at Ewing while Ewing faculty were brought to Wooster as Ewing Fellows; a plaque with the names of Ewing Fellows hangs in Babcock Hall. The Wooster in India program provides for the exchange of students and ideas.

Today, 15% of the student body is international in origin, representing 59 countries. The college offers instruction in seven foreign languages and opportunities to study abroad in 60 countries. Sixty-nine percent of Wooster students are from outside of Ohio.

=== Performing arts ===
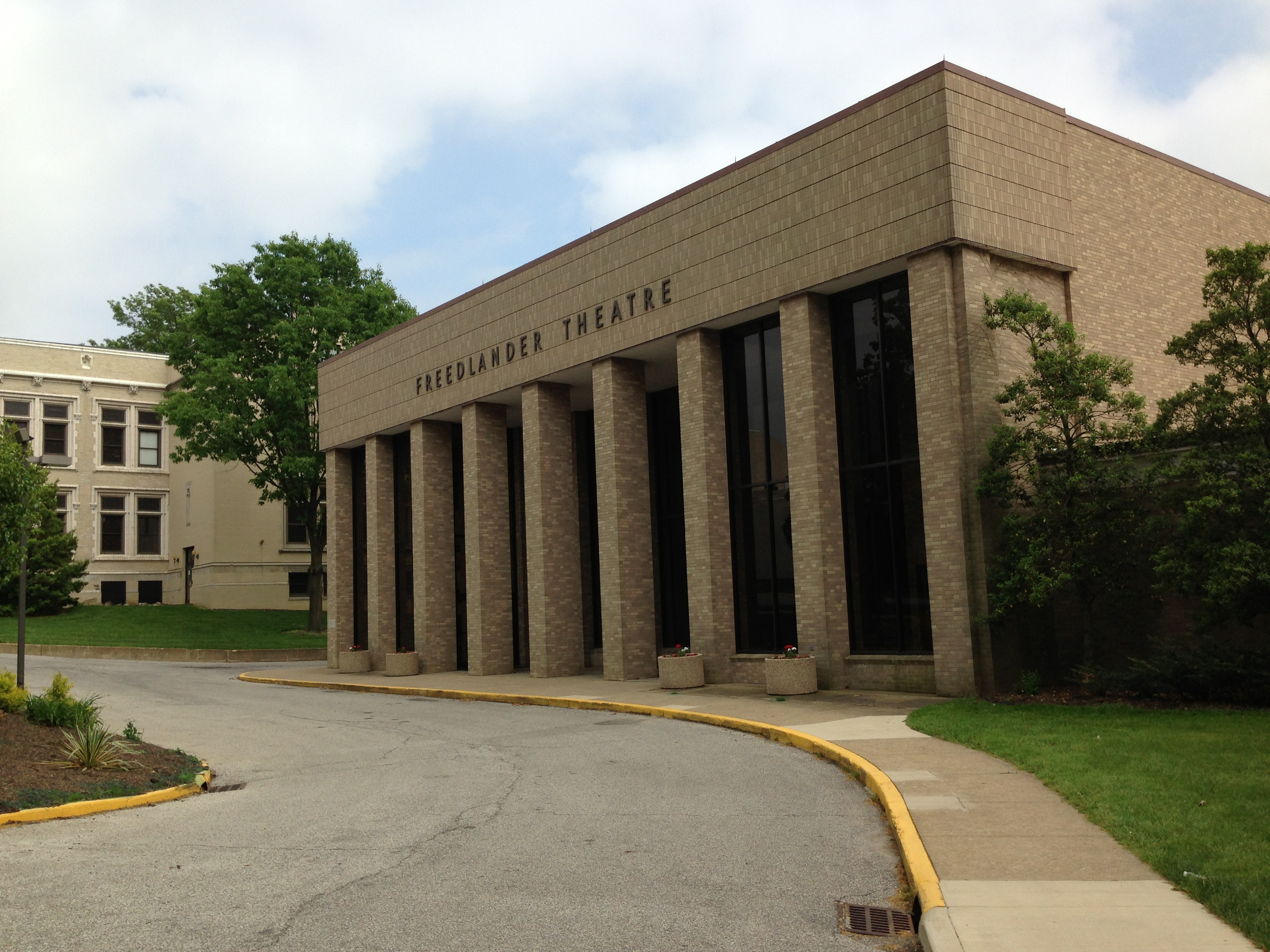
Freedlander Theatre is the main auditorium on campus.

Wooster is the home of the Ohio Light Opera, an enterprise founded within the college in 1979, but not part of the college curriculum. It is the only professional company in the United States entirely devoted to operetta. OLO performs the entire Gilbert & Sullivan repertoire, but also regularly revives rarely performed continental works of the 19th and early 20th centuries. Over the years, the company has produced eighty different operettas.

Wooster's performing ensembles include the Wooster Symphony Orchestra, founded in 1915 by Daniel Parmelee, then Professor of Violin at the college. The orchestra currently is the second-oldest orchestra in continuous performance in the state of Ohio. Additional ensembles include the Scot Symphonic and Marching Bands, the Wooster Chorus, and the Wooster Jazz Ensemble.

Wooster has an active on-campus pipe band. Officially called the College of Wooster Pipe Band, members perform at many official on-campus events such as commencement, sports games (football, basketball, swim meets, and sometimes lacrosse games) and many spontaneous student-run events. During the spring season, they perform and compete at a grade 3 level, having won prizes at the Scots wi' Shotts event in Cleveland hosted by the local Lochaber Pipe Band. The Pipe Band also placed first in the grade 3 contest at the 2009 Toronto Indoor Highland Games, as the only American band competing.

The college's department of Theatre and Dance produces two dance concerts per year, a fall concert in the round, and a spring concert in a more formal proscenium setting. Additionally, the college produces at least two plays each academic year. Further plays are produced by student groups and seniors pursuing their Independent Study projects. In 2007, Wooster's theatre production of 'Nocturne' was invited to perform at the Kennedy Center's American College Theatre Festival in Washington, D.C. Wooster's production was one of four shows chosen from a field of approximately 400 entries.

Department of Theatre and Dance - 2026 Productions
- 1. Fall Production: EMIL!A, by Morgan Lloyd Malcom.

=== Greek life, honor and professional societies ===
The College of Wooster has hosted more than 80 fraternities, sororities, and honor societies since its establishment, with approximately 30 active today. The most visible are the college's Greek Academic and Social chapters. The Greek System includes Honor Societies and Professional Fraternities.

=== Student organizations ===
The Wooster Voice is the weekly student newspaper with a newly launched website, and has been published weekly since 1883 (see list of college newspapers), while WOO 91, which was at WCWS-FM until 2019, is the college's online radio station that streams from iHeartRadio.

The college's Moot Court team participates in the American Moot Court Association, won a 2008 National Championship, and was ranked second in the nation in 2017 by the ACMA.

== Athletics ==
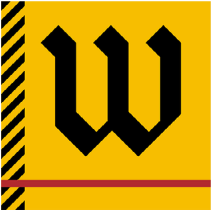
Wooster athletics logo

Wooster teams are named the Fighting Scots. Wooster's athletic history dates back to its first baseball team, in 1880, which played only one game, losing 12–2 to Kenyon College. The football program was established in 1889; over its first two seasons, the team won all seven games it played, by a total score of 306–4. Included was a 64–0 victory at Ohio State on November 1, 1890, in the Buckeyes' first-ever home football game. Shortly thereafter, intercollegiate sports were banned by the College President.

== Notable people ==
- J.C. Chandor, filmmaker
- Martha Chase, geneticist
- Arthur Holly Compton, Nobel Prize-winning physicist and chancellor of Washington University in St. Louis
- John Dean, White House Counsel for U.S. President Richard Nixon and participant in the Watergate scandal
- John Exter, economist, member of the Board of Governors of the Federal Reserve System, and founder of the Central Bank of Sri Lanka
- Stanley Gault, businessman
- Duncan Jones, film director, producer, and screenwriter; son of David Bowie
- Donald Kohn, former vice chairman of the Board of Governors of the Federal Reserve System
- Norman Morrison, anti-war activist who self-immolated in front of the Pentagon in 1965
- Lamont Paris, college basketball coach
- William P. Richardson, co-founder and first dean of Brooklyn Law School
- George E. Goodfellow, first civilian trauma surgeon and naturalist
- S. Robson Walton, billionaire heir to the fortune of Walmart
- Susanne Woods, provost of Wheaton College and associate dean of faculty at Brown University

== See also ==
- Oberlin College
- Independent study
