= Xiong Rulin =

Xiong, Rulin
- Born: January 2, 1978 (age 47)
- Occupation: singer
- Years active: 2007s - Present

Xiong Rulin (Chinese: 熊汝霖; pinyin: Xióng Rǔlín; born January 2, 1978, also known as Shawn Rolling) is a Christian singer from China and winner of CCTV Dream China singer contest in 2006.

== Biography ==
When he was a junior high school student, he passed ten-tier piano exam in China. In 1997, he worked at bars playing music. In 1999, he became a TV host of 昆明 television. In 2000, he held a personal concert. From 2003 to 2006, he studied in Ashland University, Ohio and Berklee College of Music, Boston. He majored in jazz in college.

He returned to China from USA and won first place in Dream China (Chinese version of American Idol) in 2006 and was named China's New Male Artist of the Year in 2007. In 2007, his first song Invincible (天下无敌) was released in China.

In 2021, he appeared on "China Music Pop Chart" special program "TOP Star Interview," and performed his new single "Rush Me."

Rulin's style of music varies from rock to jazz to sometimes popular, both in Chinese and English.

== Discography ==
=== Albums ===
- 2011 - Aviation Blvd
- 2012 - 面朝大海 春暖花开 EP
- 2021 - Rise of Kingdoms - Truth of the Land
