= Jill DeMatteis =

American statistician

Jill Marie Montaquila DeMatteis is an American statistician specializing in survey methodology. She has worked as a statistician in the US Bureau of Labor Statistics, and is a research associate professor at the University of Maryland, College Park and a vice president in the Statistics and Evaluation Sciences Group of Westat.

== Education and career ==
DeMatteis graduated from Ashland College in 1989, majoring in mathematics and economics; she credits Ashland mathematics professor Alan G. Poorman with her decision to study mathematics there. After earning a master's degree in statistics from Miami University in Ohio, she became a Bureau of Labor Statistics researcher from 1991 to 1995.

She moved to Westat in 1995 and returned to graduate study, completing her Ph.D. at American University in 1998. Her dissertation, All-Cases Imputation Variance Estimator: A New Approach to Variance Estimation for Imputed Data, was supervised by Robert Jernigan.

== Service and recognition ==
DeMatteis was president of the Washington Statistical Society for 2006–2007, chaired the Survey Research Methods Section of the American Statistical Association (ASA) in 2013, and chaired the ASA Government Statistics Section in 2014.

She was named a Fellow of the American Statistical Association in 2008. In 2016 the Government Statistics Section gave her their Pat Doyle Award.
