= Howard F. Lowry =

American literary scholar and President, College of Wooster

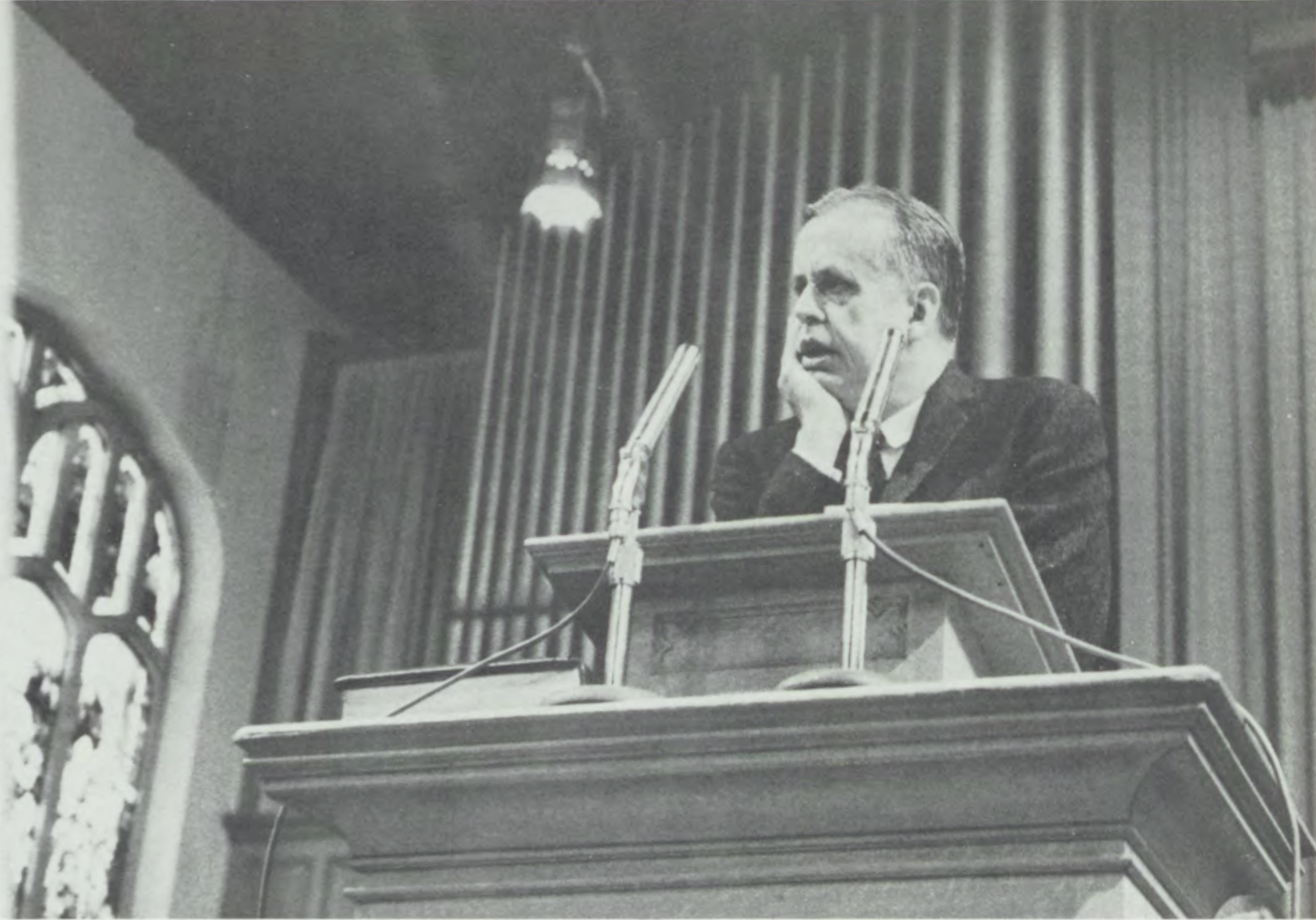
Lowry c. 1960

Howard Foster Lowry (26 July 1901 Portsmouth, Ohio – 4 July 1967 Oakland, California) was an American literary scholar and president of College of Wooster from 1944 to his death in 1967.

He was an active lay leader in the national Presbyterian church, promoted liberal arts colleges, served on the American Council on Education, and as a scholar published widely, with a specialty on British literature, especially Matthew Arnold, the nineteenth-century English literary critic and poet. At the College of Wooster he was known for maintaining the college's religious orientation and establishing the program of independent study for all students.

== Education and early career ==
Lowry graduated from Wooster in 1923, took a PhD from Yale University in 1931, where he was a Sterling Fellow in 1930 and 1933. He rose through the ranks at Wooster to become full professor in 1931. He held a Guggenheim Fellowship for England in 1934 to study the lives and works of Matthew Arnold and Arthur Hugh Clough. From 1935 to 1940, he was general editor and education review editor of New England Quarterly. In 1941, Princeton appointed him professor of English. His inaugural lecture there was titled "Matthew Arnold and the Modern Spirit".

Lowry's publications were generally well received. The New York Times wrote of his edited volume, The Letters of Matthew Arnold to Arthur Hugh Clough, that "this collection of letters will be of immense interest to students of the Victorian literary scene. The statement should be made stronger; scholars of that period cannot do without them." The reviewer in Modern Language Review welcomed The Poetry of Matthew Arnold: A Commentary, written with C.B. Tinker, specifying that "the critical and textual commentary on the individual poems show the ripe scholarship, judgement and understanding of Arnold which we have learnt to expect from the editors."

== College of Wooster ==
In 1944, the College of Wooster asked Lowry to leave Princeton to succeed Charles F. Wishart as president of Wooster, where he served until his death 1967. An admiring history of the college opened by saying "This story begins with Howard Lowry — how could it not begin with Howard Lowry, who brought to The College of Wooster the academic standard that for nearly three-quarters of a century has distinguished it from other outstanding liberal arts colleges; the scholar admired and honored on both sides of the Atlantic; the orator with a baritone so mellifluous that his lectures sounded operatic…"

In his inaugural address, September 1945, Lowry outlined a program of independent study. He stipulated that this was not for honors students alone; honors would be awarded only in the senior year on the basis of accomplishment. This program, he continued, would not just be both progressive and traditional, but "an aristocratic education on democratic princples." Independent study remains a distinguishing part of the college's curriculum, in which each student prepares a mentored independent project.

Lowry continued to emphasize the college's religious orientation. A reviewer of Lowry's The Mind's Adventure (1950) called it an "important and inescapable book," one that endorsed the belief that "a liberal education which omits religion is not, in the nature of things, liberal education at all." In 1957 Time Magazine reported that Wooster sent 10% to 15% of its graduates into the ministry. An aide to Lowry said that "Christianity is not something we just talk about; it's something we live here. You simply do not have a liberal education when you divorce learning from man's deepest inquiry." Lowry was energetic and successful in raising money for the college, increasing scholarship aid, and improving campus structures. Others recalled the support he offered to theater and arts programs.

Lowry died while on the West Coast on what the New York Times called "a business and pleasure trip."

== Personal life ==
His biographer, James Blackwood, wrote that while at Princeton, Lowry met a young woman and that the two fell deeply in love; she broke the engagement, however, when it became clear that Lowry's mother would always live with them. Blackwood writes that Lowry's romances were marked by "desire and innocence."

Lowry's record at Wooster was challenged, however, by detailed reports of repeated instances when Lowry took advantage of his powerful position in order to get close to young women and that he had romanced, inappropriately embraced, or made wedding proposals to women students and faculty members. There were reports that Lowry died on the West Coast visiting one of these women. Some protested having the Lowry Center named for him. The Board of Trustees responded that Lowry had "pursued romantic relationsips with recent graduates in ways that were unwelcome, very persistent, and harmful," but that "these matters do not include physical or sexual assault." The renovated Lowry Student Center was dedicated February 25, 2023.

== Representative publications ==
=== Articles and reports ===
- Manwaring, Elizabeth, Howard F. Lowry and William C. De Vane (1941). "The College English Association: A Statement of Purpose". The News Letter of the College English Association. 3 (7): 1. JSTOR 44402028.
- Lowry, Howard F. (1954). "The Christian College as a Christian Community [with Discussion]". The Christian Scholar. 37: 218–230. JSTOR 41176791.

=== Books and edited volumes ===
- Emerson, Ralph Waldo, Arthur Hugh Clough, Howard Foster Lowry, Ralph L. Rusk and Club Rowfant (1934). Emerson-Clough Letters. Cleveland: Rowfant Club.
- Tinker, Chauncey Brewster, Howard Foster Lowry and Francis James Wylie (1940). The Poetry of Matthew Arnold; a Commentary. London: Oxford University Press.
- Lowry, Howard Foster and A. C. Ward (1943). 'What Was, and Is, and Will Abide ...' Adapted from A. C. Ward's a Literary Journey through Wartime Britain. New York: Oxford University Press.
- Lowry, Howard Foster, W. A. Dwiggins and Library Enoch Pratt Free (1944). Literature in American Education. Baltimore: Enoch Pratt Free Library.
- Lowry, Howard Foster, and Willard Thorp, eds. 1946. An Oxford Anthology of English Poetry. New York: Oxford University Press.
- Lowry, Howard Foster (1950). The Mind's Adventure; Religion and Higher Education. Philadelphia: Westminster Press. Internet Archive
- Arnold, Matthew and Howard Foster Lowry (1952). Note-Books. London: Oxford University Press.
- Arnold, Matthew, Howard Foster Lowry and Lowry Howard Foster (1968). The Letters of Matthew Arnold to Arthur Hugh Clough. Oxford: Clarendon Press. ISBN 0198124015.

== Citations ==
=== Bibliography ===
- Burdette, Chloe (21 April 2021), "The Complicated Legacy Of President Howard Lowry: As Our Values Evolve, Do Our Heroes Change As Well?", The Wooster Voice
- Footlick, Jerrold K. (2015), An Adventure in Education: The College of Wooster from Howard Lowry to the Twenty-First Century, The Kent State University Press
- New York Times (5 July 1967), "Howard F. Lowry, Educator, Writer" (PDF), New York Times
- Lowry, Howard F. (1 September 1945), "Sketch for a Family Portrait: Inaugural address of President Howard Foster Lowry", Presidents Collection, The College of Wooster Presidents Collection
- Lowry, Howard F. (1941). "The Old and the New Humanities". The Classical Journal. 36 (4): 197–210. JSTOR 3290763.
- Notestein, Lucy Lilian. Wooster of the Middle West. Kent State University Press, 1971.
- Sanborn, Debra L., 1979. Growth of a Scholar : The Intellectual Development of Howard F. Lowry Based on His Unpublished Correspondence with Waldo Dunn, 1924-1935. Presented in partial fulfillment of the requirements of Independent Study, English 451–452, The College of Wooster OCLC 6794857
