= Concerto competition =

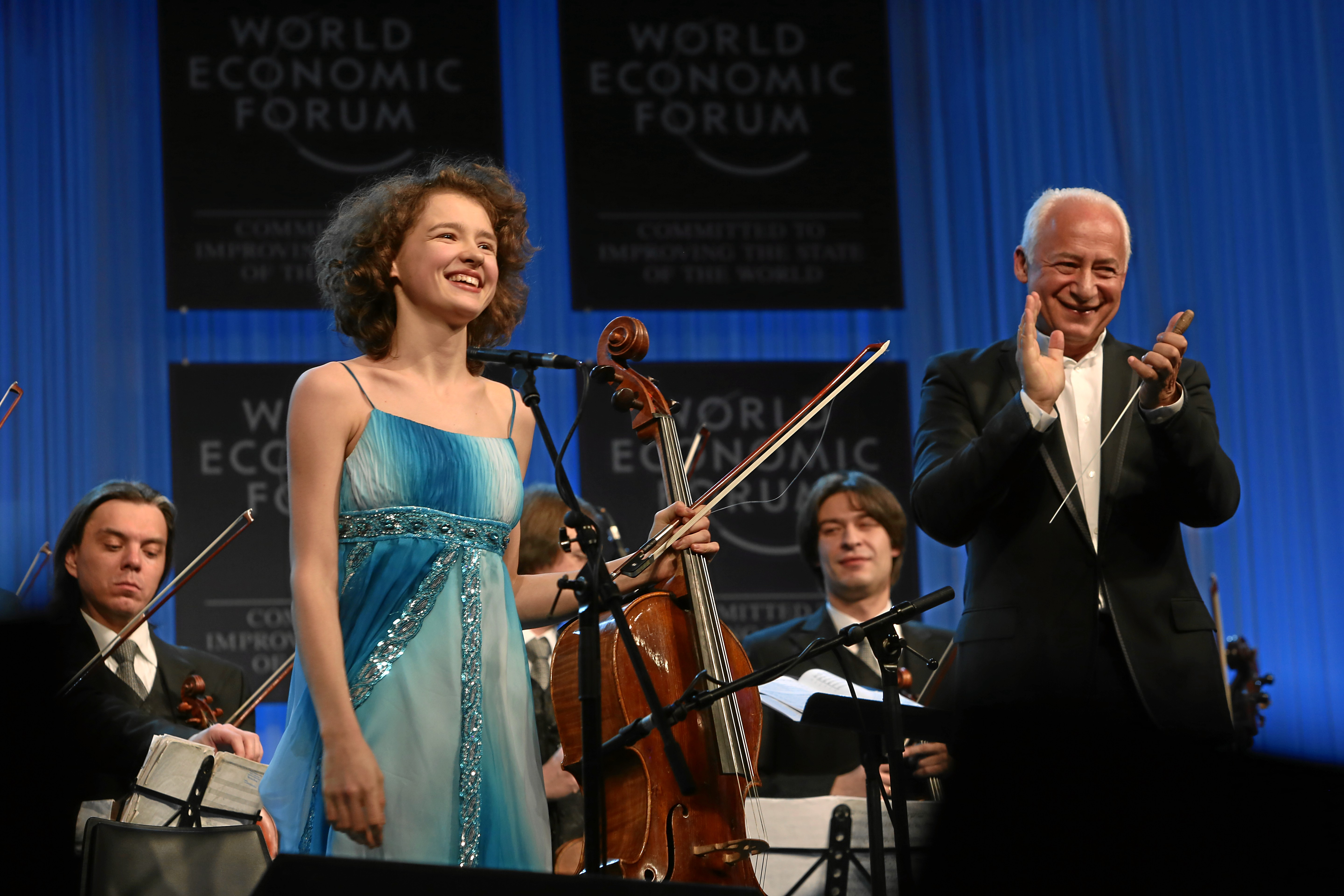
A soloist being applauded

In classical music, a concerto competition is a competition whereby contestants perform concertos or movements of concertos in a qualifying round, in order to be selected to play their concerto with an orchestra. Typically, the final round is a public concert featuring the finalists performing with orchestra. After the final round, a winner is decided, who may receive an opportunity to perform the complete concerto with the orchestra in their next season.

Concerto competitions are a common classical music event. They are often organised by the orchestra that accompanies the competitors as a way to attract audiences, but sometimes they are hosted by a university or conservatory, for the purpose of encouraging a higher standard of playing among its students, and for publicity.

Concerto competitions are distinguished from general classical music competitions, even though their final rounds may have an identical format. For example, the Tchaikovsky competition has a final round in which competitors perform movements of concertos with orchestra, but previous rounds test the competitors on different repertoire; therefore it is not a concerto competition. Since concerto competitions are meant to be entered with only a single piece, a concerto or movement of a concerto, they are not ideal designs for international competitions, which aim to test their candidates on a wide variety of skills and playing styles. However, the average playing difficulty of a concerto is reasonably high; this, coupled with the fact that opportunities to play as a soloist with an orchestra are limited, make concerto competitions a local but advanced form of music competition.
