= Charles F. Wishart =

President College of Wooster and Presbyterian Churchman

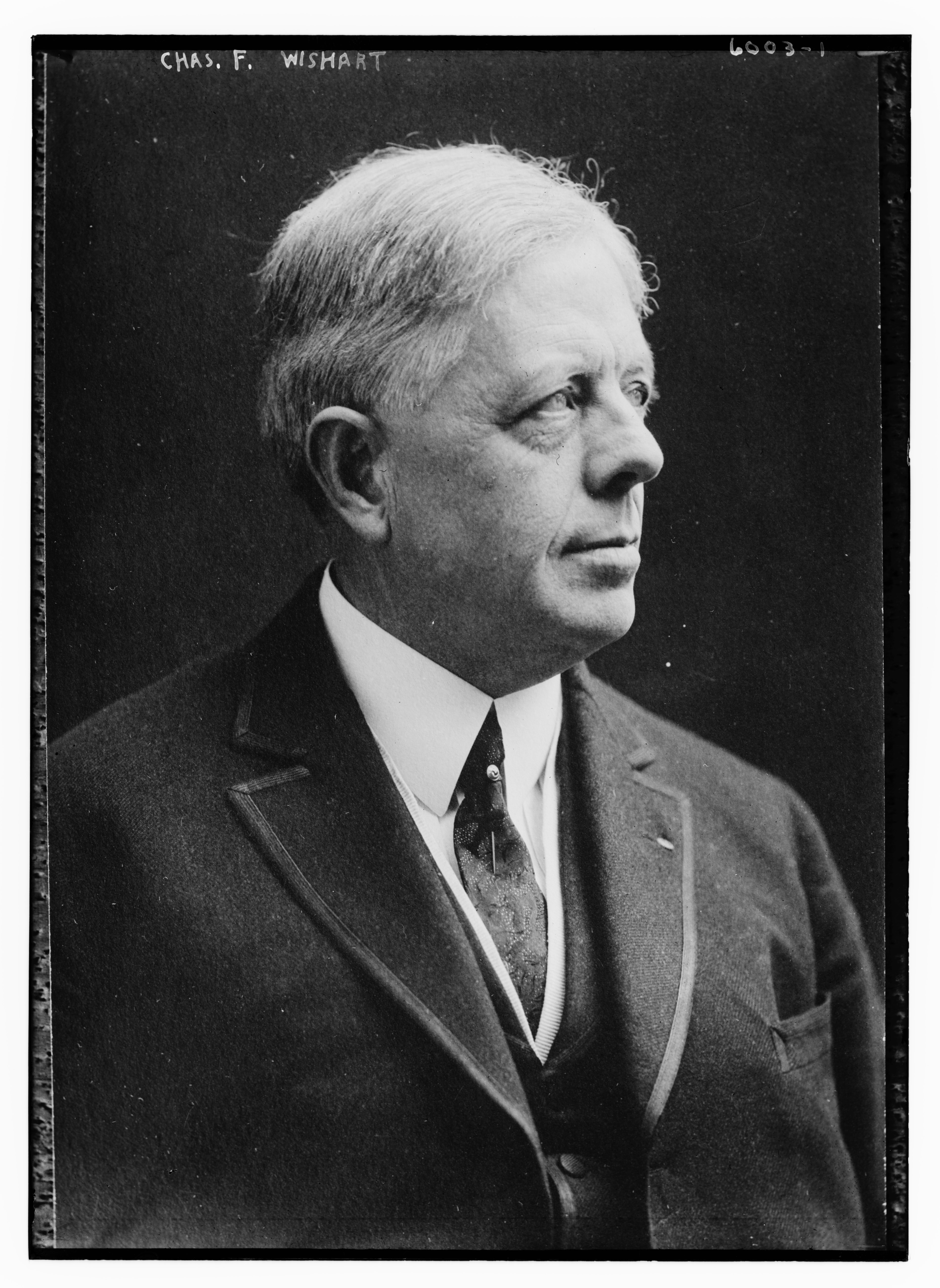

President of College of Wooster
- In office 1919–1944
- Succeeded by: Howard F. Lowry

Personal details
- Born: Charles F. Wishart; October 3, 1870 Ontario, Ohio
- Died: 1960
- Education: Monmouth College; Pittsburgh Theological Seminary

Charles Frederick Wishart (1870–1960) was a United States Presbyterian churchman who was President of the College of Wooster from 1919 to 1944. In 1923 he defeated William Jennings Bryan to become Moderator of the General Assembly of the Presbyterian Church in the United States of America at the height of the Fundamentalist–Modernist Controversy.

== Biography ==
Charles F. Wishart was born in Ontario, Ohio on September 3, 1870, the youngest of twelve children. His mother was Sarah (Irvine) Wishart, and his father, the Rev. William Wishart (1821–1906), was a minister of the United Presbyterian Church of North America. On July 6, 1904, he married Josephine Long. They had three children, Sara (MacMillan), James Hunt, and Josephine Bosworth (Hayford).

Wishart received his early education in Ontario and Hayesville, Ohio. He graduated from Monmouth College (Illinois) in 1894, where he was Phi Beta Kappa. He then took a graduate degree from Pittsburgh Theological Seminary.

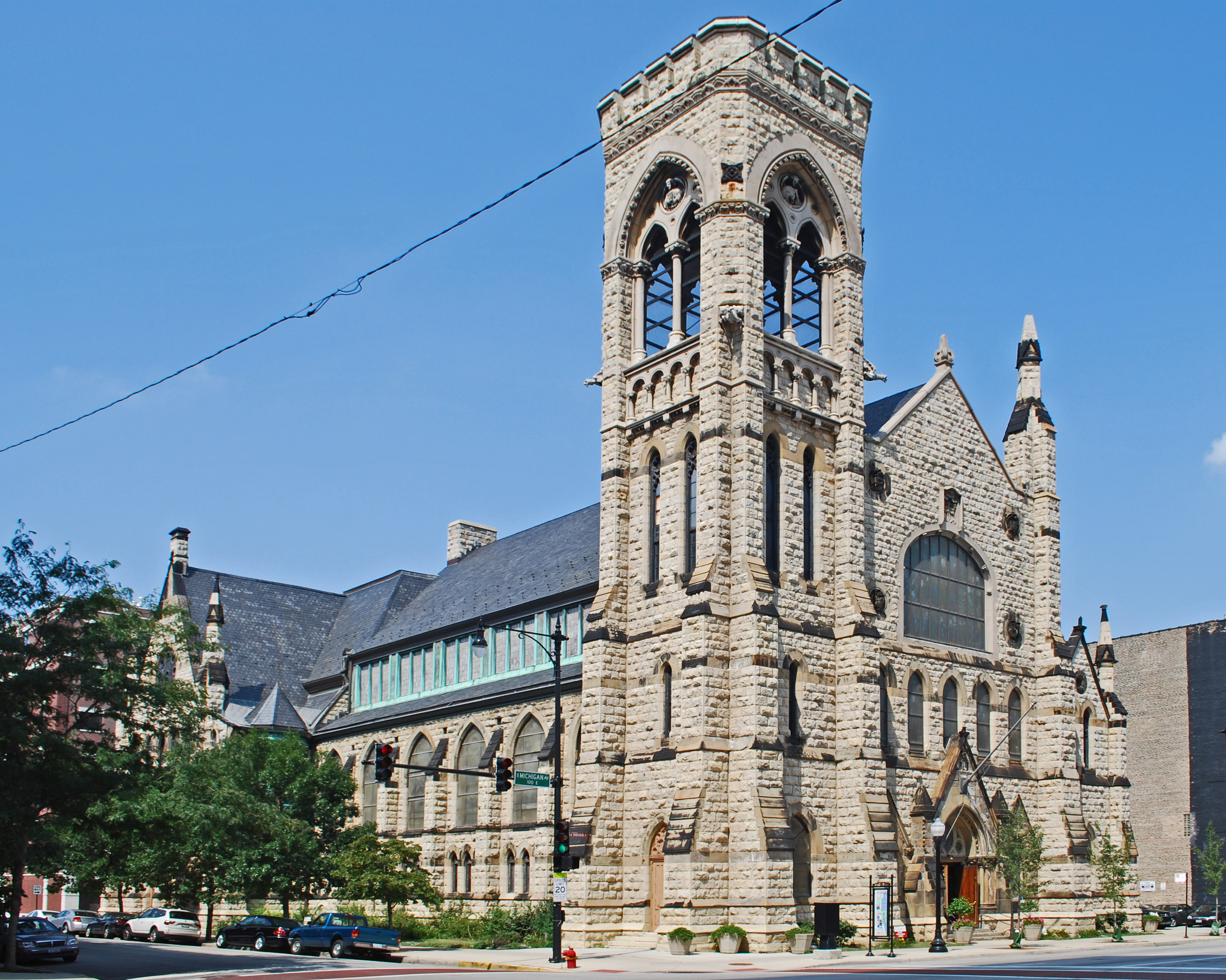
Second Presbyterian Church in Chicago, where Wishart was pastor from 1914 to 1919.

He was ordained as a minister of the United Presbyterian Church in 1897. In 1897, he founded 11th United Presbyterian Church in Pittsburgh, serving as its pastor until 1910. He served as president of the National Young Peoples Christian Union in 1897. From 1910 to 1914, he was a professor of systematic theology at Pittsburgh Theological Seminary.

In 1914, Wishart became the pastor of Second Presbyterian Church in Chicago, joining the Presbyterian Church in the United States of America at this time. He held this position until 1919. During this time, he served as a lecturer at McCormick Theological Seminary from 1915 to 1917. He was a member of the General Board of Christian Education of the Presbyterian Church in the United States of America from 1917 to 1919.

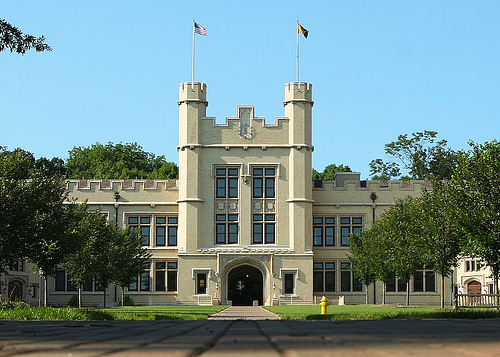
Kauke Hall, the main academic hall of the College of Wooster, where Wishart was president 1919–1944.

He left Chicago in 1919 to become president of the College of Wooster, where he served until his retirement in 1944. He served as Moderator of the Synod of Ohio in 1929.

He died in 1960.

Wishart Hall was built to honor him in 1966 with a gift from the citizens of Wayne County as a home for the Communications Department which also houses the Friedlander Speech and Hearing Clinic.

== Controversy over the teaching of evolution and contest with William Jennings Bryan ==
The college had taught the theory of evolution for several decades when Wishart became president, and the college library carved the name of learned men on a frieze in the main reading room that included Socrates, Moses, Plato, and Darwin. The instructor of the biology and zoology courses took pains to argue the compatibility of evolution and Christianity, but William Jennings Bryan denounced evolution when he came to visit Wooster in 1923, declaring that "it is better to know the Rock of Ages than the age of rocks."

Wishart defended the teaching of evolution at the college, and the issue became heated. At the 1923 General Assembly met in May, 1923, in Indianapolis, Indiana, the college's position and Bryan's disagreement with it were widely known. The New York Times reported that the nominations of Bryan and Wishart meant that "in a measure, the Presbyterian Church is being divided into evolutionists and anti-evolutionists." Bryan led on the first two ballots, but on the third ballot, two candidates from California withdrew and threw their support to Wishart, giving him a 451 to 427 victory.

== Chief publications ==
- The God of the Unexpected Wooster, Ohio: Wooster College Press, 1923
- The New Freedom in the Natural Order. New York: The Macmillan Company, 1931
- The Bible in Our Day: a Symposium. New York: American Bible Society, 1935
- The Book of Day: A Study in the Revelation of St. John. New York: Oxford University Press, 1935

== Notes ==
Religious titles
Preceded by The Rev. Calvin C. Hays	Moderator of the 134th General Assembly of the Presbyterian Church in the United States of America; 1923–1924	Succeeded by The Rev. Clarence Edward Macartney
