= List of Kenyon College people =

Here follows a list of notable people associated with Kenyon College in Gambier, Ohio. This list includes the college's notable alumni, organized by their fields of endeavor, in addition to notable members of its faculty and a complete chronological list of the presidents of the college.

== Distinguished graduates ==
Selected Kenyon alumni

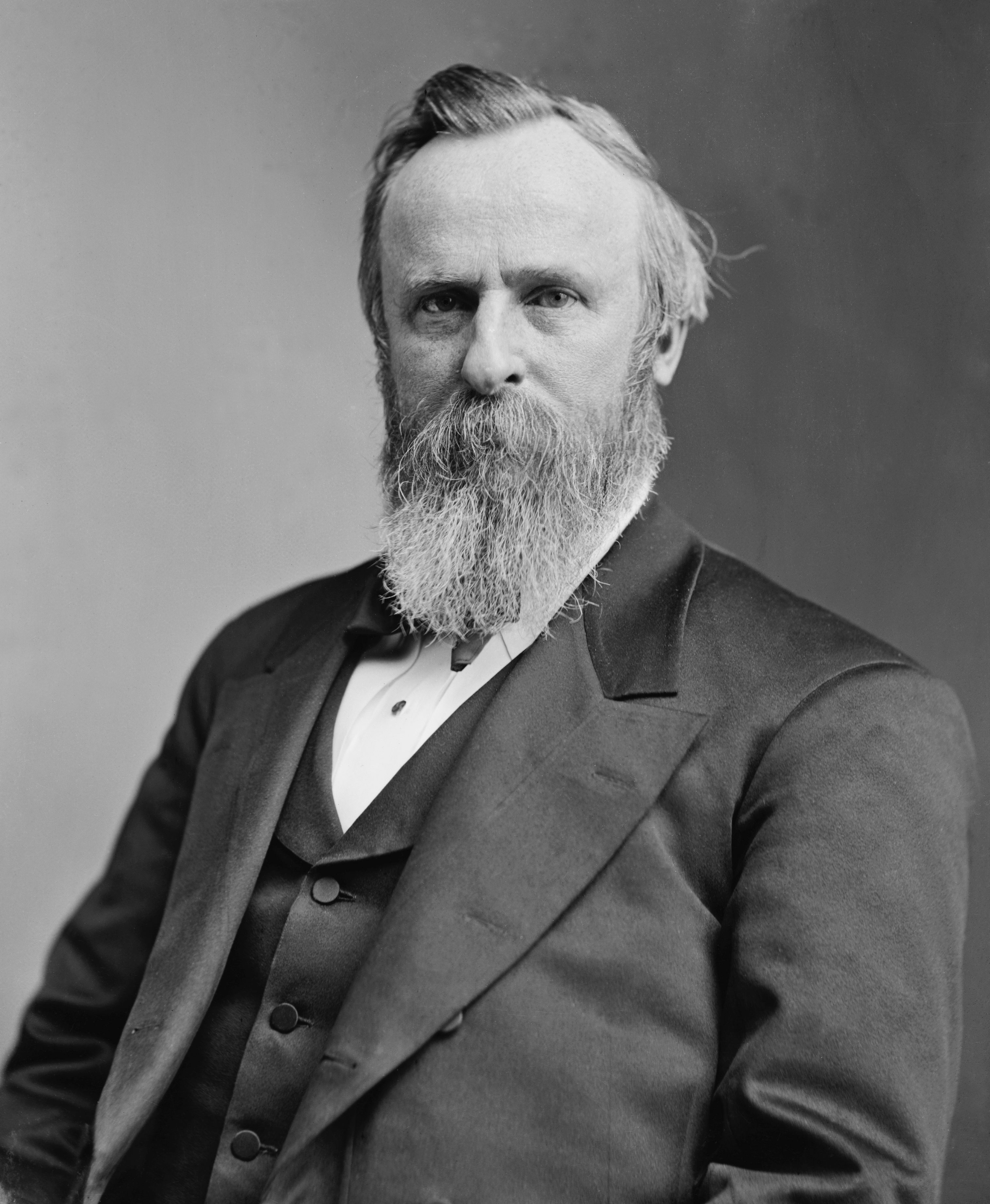
19th President of the United States Rutherford B. Hayes, class of 1842

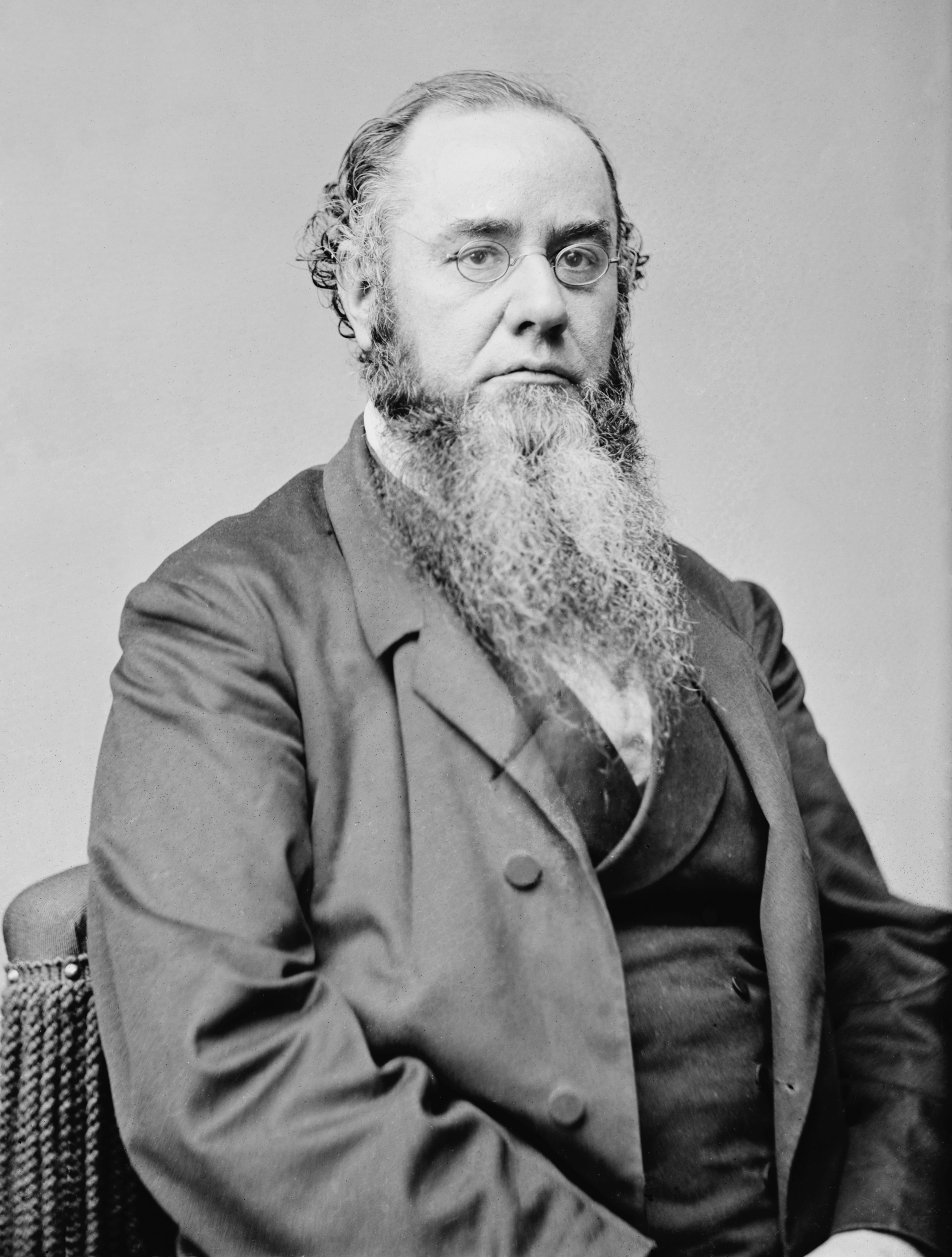
US Secretary of War Edwin M. Stanton, class of 1834

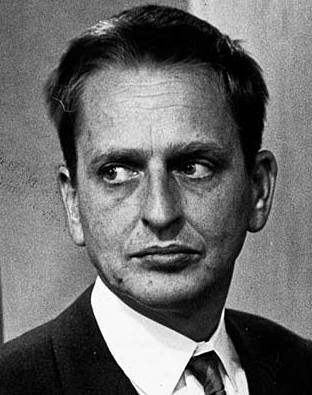
Swedish Prime Minister Olof Palme, class of 1948

Academy Award-winning actor Paul Newman, class of 1949

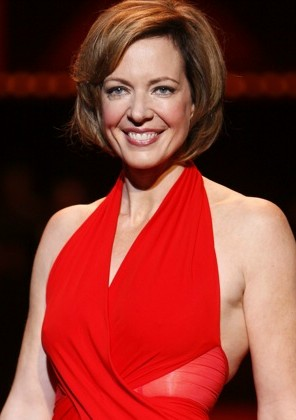
Academy Award and Primetime Emmy Award-winning actress Allison Janney, class of 1982

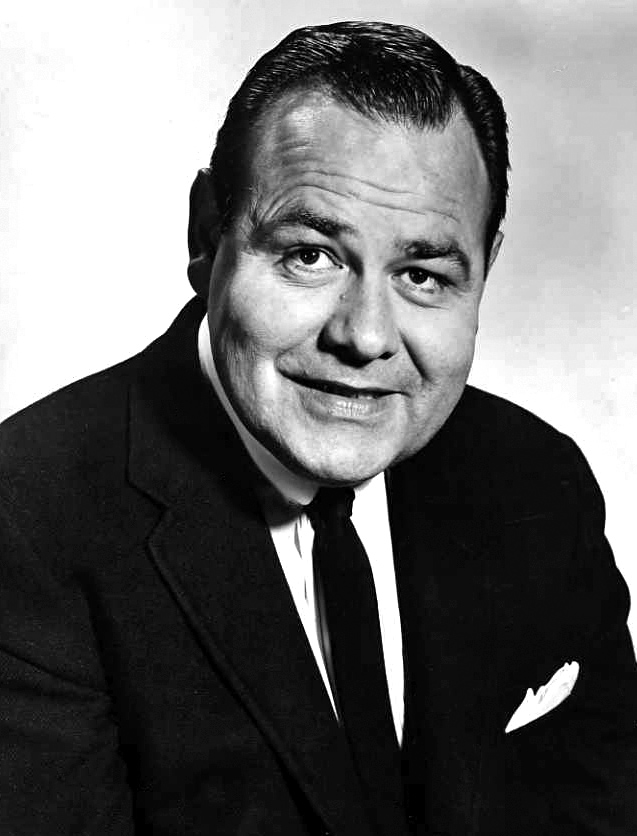
Comedian Jonathan Winters, class of 1950

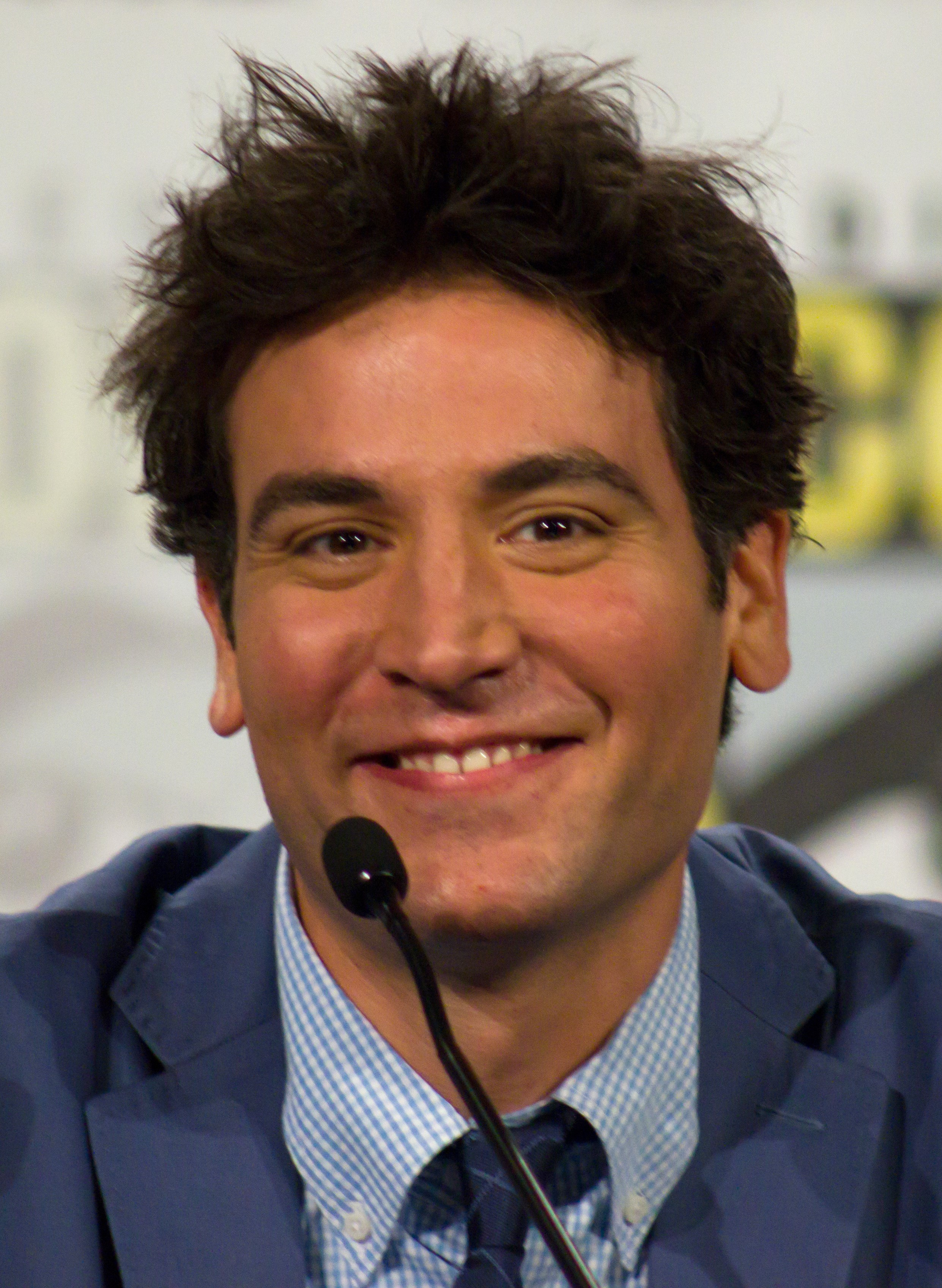
Actor and filmmaker Josh Radnor, class of 1996

=== Academia ===
Name	Occupation	Class year
C. Lawrence Evans	Newton Family Professor of Government at William & Mary and former chair of the Legislative Studies Section of the American Political Science Association	1980
John Allen Gable	Executive director of the Theodore Roosevelt Association from 1974 to his death in February 2005; considered the world's leading authority on Theodore Roosevelt	1965
Amos N. Guiora	Professor of law at University of Utah and Israel Defense Forces Judge Advocate General's Corps (lt. col. ret.)	1979
Constantinos Patrides	Professor of English Literature, University of Michigan	1952
Aaron Perzanowski	Thomas W. Lacchia Professor of Law, University of Michigan Law School	2001

=== Activism ===
Name	Occupation	Class year
Ron Link	Former fire fighter and actor (patient advocate)	
Leopoldo López	Venezuelan politician in Opposition to Chávez and Maduro	1993

=== Business ===
Name	Occupation	Class year
Arjav Ezekiel	Restaurateur and sommelier	
Hugh Forrest	Media executive, co-CEO, SXSW	1984

=== Law ===
Name	Occupation	Class year
James G. Carr	Judge of the United States District Court for the Northern District of Ohio	1962
David Davis	Senator, Supreme Court Justice	1832
James Gwin	Judge of the United States District Court for the Northern District of Ohio	1976
Thomas Stanley Matthews	Senator, Supreme Court justice	1840
Paul Niemeyer	Judge of the United States Court of Appeals for the Fourth Circuit	1962
Kathleen M. O'Malley	Judge of the United States District Court for the Northern District of Ohio	1979
William Rehnquist	Chief justice, Supreme Court of the United States	(attended)
Augustus J. Ricks	Judge of the United States District Court for the Northern District of Ohio	(attended)
William F. Turner	First chief justice of the Territory of Arizona	1842

=== History, literature, and journalism ===
Name	Occupation	Class year
Jim Bellows	Journalist, newspaper editor	1947
Jenna Blum	Writer	1992
Scott Carney	Investigative journalist	2000
Caleb Carr	Novelist, military historian	1977
Jay Cocks	Film critic, Academy Award-nominated screenwriter	1966
Stephanie Danler	Novelist	2006
E. L. Doctorow	Novelist, cultural critic	1952
William Gass	Writer, winner of the American Book Award	1947
David Goodwillie	Novelist	1994
John Green	Author; winner of Michael L. Printz Award for Looking for Alaska	2000
Saskia Hamilton	Poet	1989
John Hattendorf	Maritime historian	1964
Anthony Hecht	Poet	
Laura Hillenbrand	Writer, author of Seabiscuit: An American Legend	(attended)
Scott Kenemore	Writer	2000
P. F. Kluge	Writer	1964
Sarah Longwell	Founder and publisher of The Bulwark	2002
Robert Lowell	Poet; two-time winner of the Pulitzer Prize; Poet Laureate 1947–1948	1940
Robie Macauley	Writer, editor of Playboy	1941
Greg Melville	Writer, journalist	1992
Robert Mezey	Writer	(attended)
Alexa O'Brien	Journalist, activist	
Riley Redgate	Writer	2016
Ransom Riggs	Writer	2001
Peter Taylor	Writer, winner of Pulitzer Prize	1940
Daniel Torday	Writer	2000
Fred Waitzkin	Writer	1965
Andrew Welsh-Huggins	Journalist, author	
Rachel DeLoache Williams	Writer	2010
Matthew Winkler	Co-founder and former editor-in-chief of Bloomberg News	1977
James Wright	Poet, winner of Pulitzer Prize	1952

=== Military ===
Name	Occupation	Class year
Ralph P. Buckland	Brigadier general, Union Army, during the Civil War	
John G. Mitchell	Brigadier general, Union Army, during the Civil War	1859

=== Performing arts ===
Name	Occupation	Class year
Knud Adams	Director	2009
Nick Bakay	Actor, comedian	1981
Annie Blackman	Musician	2020
Adam Davidson	Academy Award-winning director	1986
Frank Dicopoulos	Actor	1979
Chris Eigeman	Actor	1987
Allison Janney	Actress, seven-time Emmy Award and Academy Award winner	1982
Wendy MacLeod	Playwright, screenwriter	1981
Amy Malkoff	Recording artist	1988
Paul Newman	Actor, Emmy Award and Academy Award winner	1949
Kris Osborn	CNN anchor	1992
Alfred Humphreys Pease	Composer	
Nicholas Petricca	Lead singer of Walk The Moon	2009
Josh Radnor	Actor and filmmaker	1996
Justin Roberts	Children's musician	1992
Jonathan Winters	Actor and comedian	(attended)
Damian Young	Actor	1983

=== Philanthropy ===
Name	Occupation	Class year
Kevin O'Donnell	Director of the U.S. Peace Corps	1947

=== Politics ===
Name	Occupation	Class year
Bridget A. Brink	U.S. ambassador to Slovakia (2019–2022) and Ukraine (2022–2025)	
Tricia Shimamura	Commissioner of the New York City Department of Parks and Recreation (2026-)	2011
Sally Cluchey	Maine state senator	2008
David Davis	Senator, Supreme Court justice	1832
Henry Winter Davis	US congressman for Maryland's 3rd and 4th district	1837
Lizzie Pannill Fletcher	US congresswoman for Texas' 7th district, 2019–present	1997
Dan Frankel	Member of the Pennsylvania House of Representatives, 1999–present	1978
Barry Goode	California judge, former legal officer for California Gov. Gray Davis	1969
Bill Harsha	Member of the United States House of Representatives, 1961–1981	1943
Rutherford B. Hayes	President of the United States	1842
Thomas Stanley Matthews	Senator, Supreme Court justice	1840
Anthony Banning Norton	Publisher of newspapers in Ohio and Texas, Know Nothing Texas state representative	1840
Olof Palme	Prime Minister of Sweden	1948
Diana Schaub	President's Council on Bioethics; professor of Political Science at Loyola University, Maryland	
John W. Snow	Secretary of the Treasury	(attended)
Zack Space	Congressman, Ohio Congressional District 18	1983
Edwin Stanton	Secretary of War during the Lincoln administration	1834
Peter Stautberg	Member of Ohio House of Representatives	1993
Evan B. Stotsenburg	President pro tempore of the Indiana Senate, Indiana attorney general	
Tommy Vietor	National security spokesman for Barack Obama	2002

=== Religion ===
Name	Occupation	Class year
Rev. James P. deWolfe	Fourth Episcopal bishop of Long Island, 1942–1966; charter member of the Sigma Pi fraternity's Lambda chapter at Kenyon	1917
Rev. William Crane Gray	First Episcopal bishop of Southern Florida, 1893–1913	1859
Rev. S. Arthur Huston	Episcopal bishop of Olympia, 1925–1944	1900
Rev. Arthur C. Lichtenberger	21st presiding bishop of the Episcopal Church; in 1961 he became the first Episcopal leader to meet with a pope; posthumously received the Founders Award from Sigma Pi fraternity in 2010	1923
Rev. Donald MacAdie	Suffragan bishop of the Episcopal Diocese of Newark, 1958–1963	1922
Rev. Arthur R. McKinstry	Former Episcopal bishop of Delaware; 1948 Lambeth Conference attendee; officiated the marriage of Lyndon B. Johnson to Lady Bird Johnson; charter member of the Sigma Pi fraternity's Lambda chapter at Kenyon	Ph.B., 1918 and M.A., 1920
Rev. Philip McNairy	Episcopal bishop of Minnesota, 1971–1977	1932
Rev. Joseph Schereschewsky	Anglican bishop of Shanghai, China, 1877–1884	
Rev. George R. Selway	Bishop of the Episcopal Diocese of Northern Michigan, 1964–1972	1929
Rev. William E. Swing	Episcopal bishop of California, 1980–2006	1958
Rev. Charles D. Williams	Fourth bishop of the Episcopal Diocese of Michigan, 1906–1915	1883/4

=== Sciences ===
Name	Occupation	Class year
Carl Djerassi	Creator of the birth control pill; winner of the National Medal of Science	1943
Rolla Dyer	Developer of the typhus vaccine; director of the National Institutes of Health	1907
Harvey Lodish	Professor, co-founder of Genzyme Corporation	1962

=== Sports ===
Name	Occupation	Class year
Chris Creighton	Football coach, Eastern Michigan University	1990
Don McNeill	Tennis player	1940
John Rinka	Basketball player and coach	1970
Shaka Smart	Men's basketball head coach, Virginia Commonwealth University, University of Texas at Austin, Marquette University	1999
Bill Veeck	MLB owner and baseball player	(attended)

=== Visual arts ===
Name	Occupation	Class year
Carl Andre	Artist	(attended)
Claire Beckett	Photographer	
Jim Borgman	Cartoonist, known for Zits	1976
Meg Cranston	Artist	1982
Eric Gaskins	Fashion designer	
Graham Gund	Architect	1963
David Horvitz	Artist	
C. Cameron Macauley	Photographer and film producer	1949
Jonathan Mannion	Photographer and director	1993
Coles Phillips	Artist	1904
Bill Watterson	Cartoonist, known for Calvin and Hobbes	1980
Victoria Wyatt	Art	

== Notable faculty members ==
- Virgil Aldrich, Philosophy
- Chauncey Colton, Homiletics
- Katherine Elkins, integrated program for Human Studies
- Robert O. Fink, Classics
- Bruce Haywood, German; provost
- Judy Holdener, Mathematics
- Jed Hoyer, Kenyon baseball coach; executive vice president and general manager, Chicago Cubs
- Lewis Hyde, English
- Randall Jarrell, English
- P. F. Kluge, English
- Perry Lentz, English
- Robie Macauley, English
- Wendy MacLeod, Theater
- George E. McCarthy, Sociology
- Otto Nikodym, Mathematics
- Paul Radin, Anthropology
- John Crowe Ransom, English
- Charles Ritcheson, History
- Richard G. Salomon, History
- Benjamin Schumacher, Physics
- Carol Schumacher, Mathematics
- Joan Slonczewski, Biology
- Anna Sun, Sociology, Asian Studies
- Denham Sutcliffe, English
- Allen Tate, English

Visiting faculty

- John Kinsella, English
- Claire Messud, English
- Barry Unsworth, English
- Katharine Weber, English
- James Wood, English

== Presidents of the college ==
1. Philander Chase (1825–1831)
2. Charles Pettit McIlvaine (1832–1840)
3. David Bates Douglass (1840–1844)
  - Samuel Fuller (acting, 1844–1845)
4. Sherlock A. Bronson (1845–1850)
5. Thomas M. Smith (1850–1854)
6. Lorin Andrews (1854–1861)
  - Benjamin L. Lang (acting, 1861–1863)
7. Charles Short (1863–1867)
8. James Kent Stone (1867–1868)
9. Eli Todd Tappan (1868–1875)
  - Edward C. Benson (acting, 1875–1876)
10. William B. Bodine (1876–1891)
11. Theodore Sterling (1891–1896)
12. William Foster Peirce (1896–1937)
13. Gordon Keith Chalmers (1937–1956)
  - Frank E. Bailey (acting, 1956–1957)
14. F. Edward Lund (1957–1968)
15. William G. Caples (1968–1975)
16. Philip H. Jordan Jr. (1975–1995)
  - Reed S. Browning (acting, 1989)
17. Robert A. Oden Jr. (1995–2002)
  - Ronald A. Sharp (acting, 2002–2003)
18. S. Georgia Nugent (2003–2013)
19. Sean M. Decatur (2013–2022)
  - Jeff Bowman (acting, 2022–2023)
20. Julie Kornfeld (2023–)
