= George McCarthy =

George McCarthy may refer to:

- George McCarthy, Chief Secretary of the Cayman Islands
- George E. McCarthy (born 1946), professor of sociology at Kenyon College

== See also ==
- Thomas St George McCarthy, Ireland rugby union player
- George McCarty, American college basketball coach
