= Katherine Elkins =

Interdisciplinary literature, ethics and AI researcher

Katherine Elkins is a professor of humanities and comparative literature and faculty in computing at Kenyon College.

== Education ==
Elkins earned a BA from Yale University and a PhD from the University of California, Berkeley.

== Teaching ==
Elkins is a professor of comparative literature and humanities in the Integrated Program for Humane Studies (IPHS) and faculty in Computing at Kenyon College. She is a founding co-director of the KDH lab and co-created a human-centered artificial intelligence curriculum launched in 2016 at Kenyon College as the director of IPHS. She recorded two lecture series for The Modern Scholar, Giants of French Literature (2010) and The Modern Novel (2013).

== Research ==
Elkins’s research addresses artificial intelligence in relation to literature, narrative, affective computing, and the ethics of AI. Her book The Shapes of Stories, published by Cambridge University Press in 2022, provides a methodology for using diachronic sentiment analysis to analyze the emotional aspects of plot across dozens of literary classics using SentimentArcs.

Elkins has co-authored essays on AI in literary studies in The Journal of Cultural Analytics in September 2020 and Narrative in 2022. Her article "A(I) University in Ruins: What Remains in a World with Large Language Models?" in the Proceedings of the Modern Language Association addresses how AI may fundamentally redefine traditional academic disciplines.

Elkins's traditional scholarship includes essays on Plato, Virginia Woolf, Franz Kafka, Marcel Proust, and William Wordsworth. In 2001 she won the A. Owen Aldridge Prize in Comparative Literature for an essay on Charles Baudelaire. She edited Proust's In Search of Lost Time: Philosophical Perspectives (Oxford University Press, 2022).

In December 2025, Schmidt Sciences' Humanities and AI Virtual Institute funded a project led by Elkins, "Archival Intelligence: Rescuing New Orleans' Endangered Cultural Legacy", to use AI to preserve endangered archives.

== AI safety and regulation ==
Elkins co-led the Modern Language Association's team in the U.S. AI Safety Institute Consortium, established by the National Institute of Standards and Technology in 2024.

Elkins co-authors research on AI governance and regulation. A position paper on the risks and opportunities of open-source generative AI, written with an international group of researchers, was selected for an oral presentation at the 2024 International Conference on Machine Learning.

Her work in applied AI ethics includes a project with the Notre Dame-IBM Tech Ethics Lab, which awarded her a grant for research into multi-agent court simulations for predicting juvenile recidivism.
