= Ron Link =

Ron Link may refer to:

- Ron Link (director), American off-Broadway director
- Ron Link (entertainer), Dutch talent show singer
- Ron Link (patient advocate), founder of Surgical Eyes
