= Governor McCarthy =

Governor McCarthy or MacCarthy may refer to:

- Charles MacCarthy (British Army officer) (1764–1824), British military governor of multiple territories in West Africa between 1812 and 1824
- Charles Justin MacCarthy (1811–1864), 12th Governor of British Ceylon
- Charles J. McCarthy (1861–1929), 5th Territorial Governor of Hawaii from 1918 to 1921
- George A. McCarthy (fl. 1970s–2000s), Acting Governor of the Cayman Islands in 2005
