= Scott Kenemore =

American novelist

- Born: 1977 (age 48–49)
- Education: Kenyon College; Columbia University (MFA)
- Occupations: Novelist; satirist
- Website: scottkenemore.com

Scott Kenemore (born 1977) is an American novelist and satirist. He graduated from Kenyon College in 2000, and has an MFA from Columbia University. A member of the Zombie Research Society and the Horror Writers Association, Scott lives in Evanston, Illinois.

== Bibliography ==
=== Novels ===
- Zombie, Ohio (2011)
- Zombie, Illinois (2012)
- The Grand Hotel (2014)
- Zombie, Indiana (2014)
- Zombie-in-Chief (2017)
- Lake of Darkness (2020)
- Edge of the Wire (2024)

=== Satirical works ===
- The Zen of Zombie: Better Living Through the Undead (2007)
- Z.E.O, (2009)
- The Art of Zombie Warfare (2010)
- The Code of the Zombie Pirate (2010)
- Zombies vs. Nazis (2011)
- The Ultimate Book of Zombie Warfare and Survival (2015)

== Other Appearances ==
- Scott Kenemore appears as a special guest on the CD "The Adventures Of Finglonger" by hip-hop artist African-American Zombie Lawyer. Before the appearance, Scott praised AAZL in his online blog, calling him "the best rapper in the Midwest...hands down."
