= Amy Malkoff =

- Born: Philadelphia, Pennsylvania, United States
- Origin: Boston, Massachusetts, United States
- Genres: Pop-Folk, acoustic
- Occupations: Singer-songwriter, producer, director
- Instruments: Vocals, guitar, piano
- Years active: 1971–present
- Website: amymalkoffmusic.com

Amy Malkoff is an American singer-songwriter, musician, producer, designer, and arts advocate based on the East Coast. Her music blends acoustic, and pop-folk music. She started auditioning for musical theatre productions at age 5 in Ohio, and by age 15 was touring in semi-professional shows. She has an AB in music from Kenyon College with graduate study at the New England Conservatory of Music. She also has a certificate in graphic and web design from Clark University.

For seven years, she performed as half of the duo Raymond Gonzalez and Amy Malkoff, and during that time they produced two full-length recordings, toured consistently, and were included on "When October Goes" (Rounder Records), among other compilations. In 1994, she founded the touring band Deadline Poet, which started out as a treble a cappella group, then a full band, and lastly a guitar/keyboard/vocal trio. The group disbanded in October 2000, but not before producing several recordings, and appearing on a handful of compilations.

Beginning in the early 90s, she served 8 years as the booking agent of the Nameless Coffeehouse in Harvard Square, Cambridge, MA, and then as creator/producer of her own concerts series (plural) at venues around the Boston area.

In 2000, she created All About Buford, an award-winning pop-funk band of a cappella and folk. Their performances consisted of some material performed without instruments (a cappella), and some with Amy playing guitar, but always with a dedicated beatboxer and harmony-focused. All About Buford was the 2003 Boston Regional Harmony Sweepstakes champions and runners-up in 2002, and Amy was awarded "Best Original Song" in '03. They also were tapped for coveted formal showcases at both The Falcon Ridge Folk Festival and The Northeast Regional Folk Alliance Conference (NERFA). They recorded one full-length CD, "Supercar", one DVD project, "Deep", some single song recordings, and they appeared on several compilation albums. They disbanded in 2008.

Amy served on the board and staff of The Contemporary A Cappella Society for several years, creating content and helping to produce festivals around the US. She also presented and continues to present workshops, run masterclasses, and sit on expert panels at events around the US. From 2014-2022, she served as Marketing Director for The A Cappella Education Association (Memphis, TN), and from 2012-2019, served as Media Director and then Executive Director of The Women's A Cappella Association (Oakland, CA). Both organizations further vocal music for singers of all ages and abilities, and present(ed) yearly conferences. She also is one of the producers of Haunted Harmonies, an a cappella festival in Salem, MA. For several years she has served as judge for various vocal competitions, most notably Varsity Vocals, the organization on which the Pitch Perfect films are based.

She also works as backup vocalist for various artists, and as a designer and marketing manager. She appears as a character in novelist/musician Christian Bauman's book "In Hoboken".

== Select Discography ==
Year	Album	Group
2004	Unfamiliar Moon	Backup for Vance Gilbert
2008	A Cappella for the World	All About Buford
2003	Harmony Sweepstakes National Finals 2003	All About Buford
2002	Supercar	All About Buford
1999	Revolving Door	Deadline Poet
1996	Acoustic Alliance 3	Deadline Poet
1993	On The Water	Raymond Gonzalez & Amy Malkoff
1991	When October Goes	Raymond Gonzalez & Amy Malkoff
1990	Curly Haired Humans	Raymond Gonzalez & Amy Malkoff
2023	The Seasons Project	With Raymond Gonzalez
2023	The Mother Of Trouble	Backup for Vance Gilbert
