= Greg Melville =

Greg Melville (born 1970) is a journalist and author. He graduated from Kenyon College in 1992 and Pennsylvania State University Graduate School of Communication in 1994.

== Writing career ==
A former newspaper reporter, and editor at Sports Afield and Men’s Journal, he has written for such publications as Men’s Journal, National Geographic Adventure, The New York Times, Outside, Best Life, Parents, and Popular Science. Melville is author of the books Over My Dead Body: Unearthing the hidden history of America's cemeteries and Greasy Rider: Two dudes, one fry-oil-powered car, and a cross-country search for a greener future. Over My Dead Body is a travel and history book that tells America's modern story through its burial grounds. The environmental book Greasy Rider recounts Melville's cross-country trip in a diesel Mercedes station wagon powered by waste vegetable oil, and investigates the keys to a greener future that are already at-hand. The book inspired filmmakers J. J. Beck and Joey Carey to create a documentary of the same title. It was released in 2009 and featured Yoko Ono, Morgan Freeman, Rae Dawn Chong, and Noam Chomsky.

== Personal life ==
Melville lives with his family in Annapolis, Maryland. He teaches English as a professor at the United States Naval Academy. He is in the U.S Navy Reserve

== Bibliography ==
- 101 Best Outdoor Towns, Sarah Tuff, Greg Melville, Countryman Press, Woodstock, VT, 2007 ISBN 0-88150-766-0
- Greasy Rider: Two dudes, one fry-oil-powered car and a cross-country search for a greener future. Greg Melville, Algonquin Books of Chapel Hill, Chapel Hill, NC, 2008 ISBN 1-56512-595-9
- Over My Dead Body: Unearthing the Hidden History of America's Cemeteries. Greg Melville, Abrams Press, New York, NY, 2022 ISBN 978-1419754852
