= Denham Sutcliffe =

American author, editor, and professor

W. Denham Sutcliffe (born in Bristol, Pennsylvania in 1913 - died in Gambier, Ohio on February 29, 1964) was an American writer, editor, and professor of English who spent most of his professional life at Kenyon College.

In his 1974 work, What shall we defend?: Essays and addresses, he summarized the importance of a liberal arts education, stating that “Liberal learning is that which underlies, that which gives purpose and direction to practical skills. It tries to distinguish between the more and the less important, between the grand and the trivial, and to concern itself rather with the center than with the periphery.”

== Career ==
Sutcliffe attended Bates College and took his B.A., where he was elected to Phi Beta Kappa. Awarded a Rhodes Scholarship in 1938, he attended Hertford College, Oxford, where he took a second B.A., earning first-class honours. The Rhodes Trust allowed him to extend his scholarship for a third year at Oxford to work on his doctorate. In 1940–41, he held a Carnegie Fellowship to complete his thesis while working independently. He completed his D.Phil. degree at Oxford University in 1943 with his thesis on "English book-reviewing, 1749-1800". He taught at Bates College and Harvard University. He was serving as president of Education for Freedom, Inc., in New York City, when he was invited to join the Kenyon English Department in 1946. He became the James H. Dempsey Professor of English at Kenyon in 1956, and in 1957 he was named Chairman of the English Department; he held both positions until his death in 1964.

== Published works ==
Among many other activities, he edited the letters of Edwin Arlington Robinson and wrote introductions to books, such as to Thoreau's A Week on the Concord and Merrimack Rivers.

- Untriangulated stars : letters of Edwin Arlington Robinson to Harry de Forest Smith, 1890-1905, Ed. by Denham Sutcliffe. Cambridge : Harvard Univ. Press, 1947; Westport, Conn., Greenwood Press, 1971.
- A week on the Concord and Merrimack Rivers by Henry David Thoreau with a foreword by Denham Sutcliffe. New York : New American Library, 1961.
- What shall we defend?: Essays and addresses. Edited and with an introduction by Harley Henry. [Gambier, Ohio] : Kenyon College, 1973, The University of Chicago Press, 1974
- Letters from Europe, 1938, Edited and with an introduction by Bruce Haywood, Nantucket, Massachusetts, EditAndPublishYourBook.com/Lulu, January 16, 2010
- New Light on the 'Chicago Writers', The Newberry Library Bulletin. Second Series, No. 5. (Dec 1950); Pgs 147–157.

He also published a series of essays and literary reviews for The Kenyon Review during the 1950s and 1960s, including: "Lives Relevant and Irrelevant" (spring 1950), "Novels of the Nebulous Self" (autumn 1950), "An Essay on Robinson's Reading" (winter 1955), and "Worth a Guilty Conscience" (winter 1961).
