= George E. McCarthy =

Academic background
- Education: New School for Social Research (sociology)
- Thesis: Systems Theory and the Engineering of Utopia: Urban Technology and Planning in the Post-Industrial City (1979)

Academic work
- Discipline: philosophy and sociology
- Sub-discipline: nineteenth- and twentieth-century German social theory
- Institutions: Kenyon College

George E. McCarthy is a professor of sociology at Kenyon College in Gambier, Ohio, United States.

== Education ==
- M.A., Ph.D. New School for Social Research (sociology) 1979
- M.A., Ph.D. Boston College (philosophy) 1972
- B.A. Manhattan College (philosophy) 1968

== Career ==
George E. McCarthy became National Endowment for the Humanities Distinguished Teaching Professor of Sociology in 2000. He has been a research fellow at Goethe University Frankfurt, a guest professor at the Institute for Political Science at LMU Munich, and a Senior Fulbright Research Fellow in philosophy and sociology at the University of Kassel. He has received a Deutscher Akademischer Austauschdienst (DAAD), Fulbright Research Fellowship, and an NEH Research Fellowship. McCarthy's courses at Kenyon College focus on ethics and social justice, political and social theory, philosophy and sociology of science, German social thought and Greek philosophy/literature, and American political economy. His major area of concentration is nineteenth- and twentieth-century German social theory: Karl Marx, Max Weber, Friedrich Nietzsche, Sigmund Freud, Martin Heidegger, Hans-Georg Gadamer, Max Horkheimer, Herbert Marcuse and Jürgen Habermas.

== Publications ==
- Marx's Critique of Science and Positivism (Dordrecht, Holland: Kluwer Academic Publishers, 1988, ISBN 90-277-2702-3)
- Marx and the Ancients: Classical Ethics, Social Justice, and Nineteenth-Century Political Economy (Savage, MD: Rowman and Littlefield Publishers, 1990, ISBN 0-8476-7641-2)
- Eclipse of Justice: Ethics, Economics, and the Lost Traditions of American Catholicism, with Royal Rhodes (Maryknoll, NY: Orbis Books, 1992)
- Marx and Aristotle: Nineteenth-Century German Social Theory and Classical Antiquity, editor (Savage, MD: Rowman and Littlefield Publishers, 1992)
- Dialectics and Decadence: Echoes of Antiquity in Marx and Nietzsche (Lanham, MD: Rowman and Littlefield Publishers, 1994, ISBN 0-8476-7920-9)
- Romancing Antiquity: German Critique of the Enlightenment from Weber to Habermas (Lanham, MD: Rowman and Littlefield Publishers, 1997)
- Objectivity and the Silence of Reason: Weber, Habermas, and the Methodological Disputes in German Sociology (New Brunswick, NJ: Transaction Publishers, 2001)
- Classical Horizons: The Origins of Sociology in Ancient Greece (Albany, NY: State University of New York Press, 2003)
- Eclipse of Justice: Ethics, Economics, and the Lost Traditions of American Catholicism, with Royal Rhodes, paperback reprint (Eugene, Oregon: Wipf and Stock Publishers, 2009)
- Dreams in Exile: Rediscovering Science and Ethics in Nineteenth-Century Social Theory (Albany, NY: State University of New York Press, 2009)
- Justice Beyond Liberalism, with Royal Rhodes (Atlantic Highlands, NJ: Humanities Press, forthcoming 2010)
- Shadows of the Enlightenment: Toward a Critical Theory of Ecology and Environmental Justice (work in progress)
- "Last of the Schoolmen: Natural Law and Social Justice in Karl Marx" in Constructing Marxist Ethics: Critique, Normativity, Praxis, ed. Michael J. Thompson, Brill, 2015, ISBN 978-90-04-25414-5
- Marx and Social Justice. Ethics and Natural Law in the Critique of Political Economy (Chicago, IL: Haymarket Books, 2019), ISBN 978-16-08-46011-3
- Justice Beyond Heaven: Natural Law and Economic Democracy in U.S., German, and Irish Catholic Social Thought with Royal W. Rhodes (Amherst, New York: Humanity Books, forthcoming)
