= Hugh Forrest =

American media executive

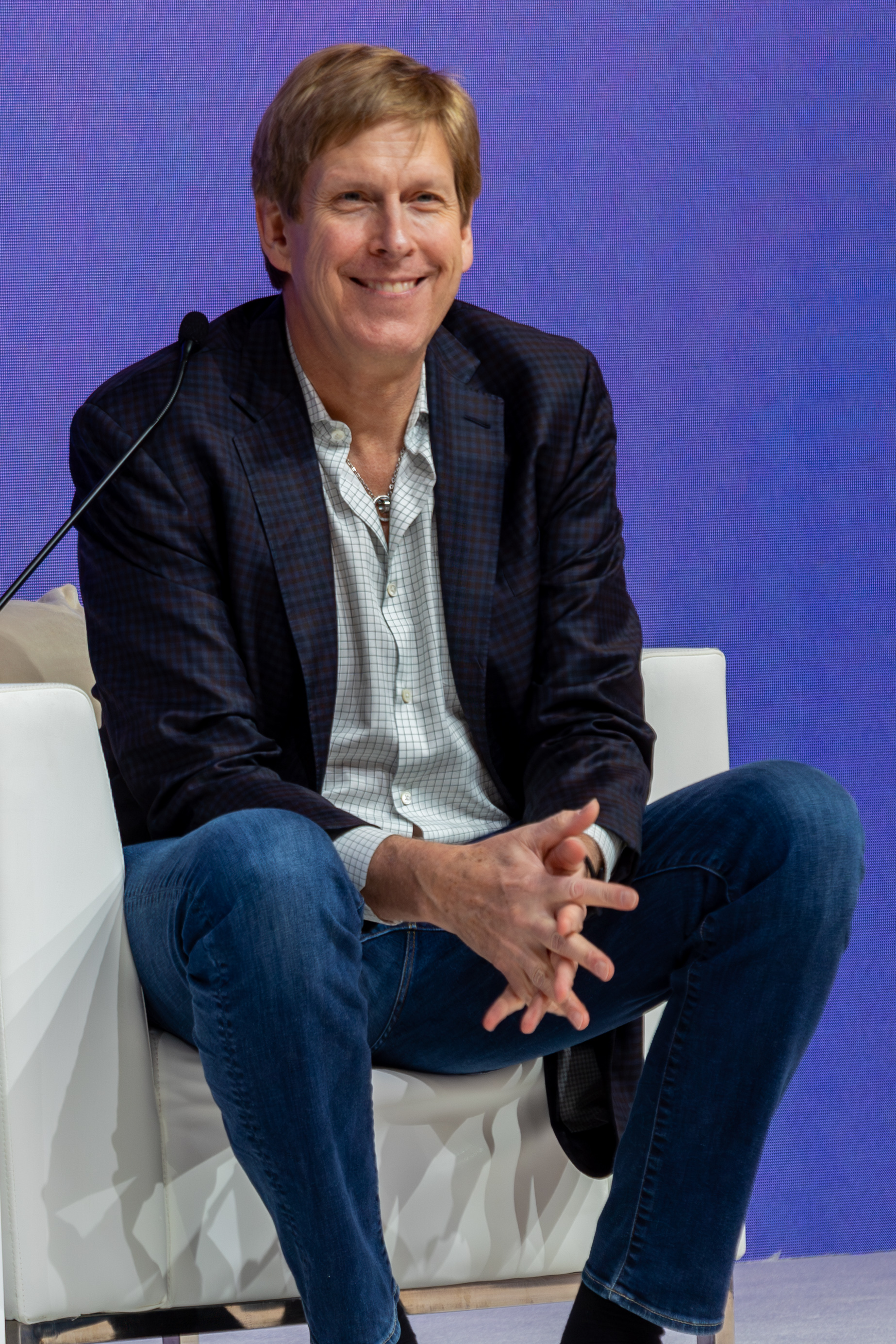
- Forrest at the Dubai Future Forum (2024)
- Education: Kenyon College (BA)
- Occupations: Co-President and Chief Programming Officer of SXSW

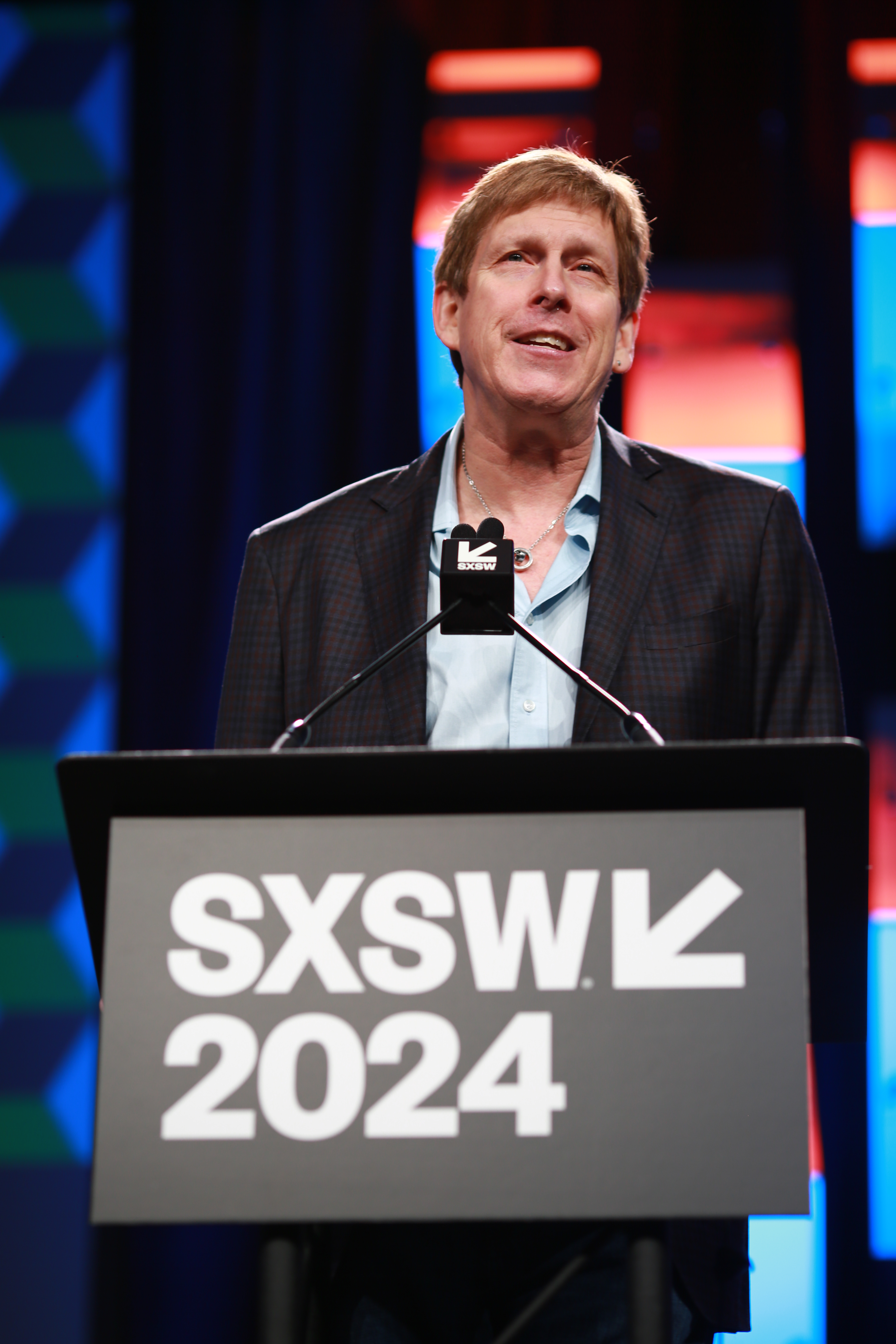
Forrest at SXSW (2024)

Hugh Forrest is an American media executive best known for serving as the co-president and chief programming officer of South by Southwest (SXSW), a major annual conglomeration of film, interactive media, and music festivals and conferences in Austin, Texas. He joined the SXSW team in 1989 and served until 2025.

== Early life and education ==
Forrest graduated from Austin High School in 1980 and later earned a degree in English from Kenyon College in Gambier, Ohio, where he was also on the basketball team. He also played professional basketball.

== Career ==
Forrest joined SXSW in 1989, where he focused on the event's interactive component. Over the years, his role expanded, as he helped SXSW become a globally recognized event.

He has served on the National Advisory Board for the Poynter Institute and the board of directors for Austin Habitat for Humanity. He currently sits on the board of directors for Knowbility, an Austin-based accessibility company.

== Awards and recognition ==
Forrest's contributions have been widely recognized. In addition to his local honors, he was awarded Diversity Champion of the Year by the Austin Black Business Journal in 2021. In January 2023, Austin Mayor Steve Adler presented Forrest with a Key to the city for his longstanding impact on the community and the success of SXSW.

In 2012, Forrest, along with SXSW Co-founders Roland Swenson, Louis Black, and Nick Barbaro, was named "Austinite of the Year" by the Austin Chamber of Commerce. In 2014, they were collectively honored as Austin Entrepreneurs of the Year by Ernst & Young. Forrest received an honorary doctorate of humane letters from Kenyon College in 2018.
