= Julie Kornfeld =

American epidemiologist and academic administrator

20th President of Kenyon College
- Incumbent
- Assumed office October 1, 2023
- Preceded by: Jeff Bowman (acting)

Personal details
- Education: Boston University (BA); University of Miami (MPH, PhD)

Academic background
- Thesis: Factors Associated with Acceptance of Human Papillomavirus Vaccine: A Study of Spanish Information Seekers. (2009)
- Doctoral advisor: David J. Lee

Julie Kornfeld is an American epidemiologist, academic administrator, and 20th president of Kenyon College since 2023.

== Early life and education ==
Kornfeld earned a bachelor's degree in journalism from Boston University. She completed a M.P.H. and a Ph.D. in epidemiology from the University of Miami. Her 2009 dissertation was titled, Factors Associated with Acceptance of Human Papillomavirus Vaccine: A Study of Spanish Information Seekers. David J. Lee was her doctoral advisor.

== Career ==
Kornfeld was the assistant dean and director of education at the Miller School of Medicine at the University of Miami. In 2016, she became the vice dean of education and associate professor of epidemiology at the Columbia University Mailman School of Public Health.

In 2020, she became the vice provost for academic programs at Columbia University.

On October 1, 2023, Kornfeld became the 20th president of Kenyon College, succeeding acting president Jeff Bowman.
