= Anduril =

Anduril may refer to:

- Anduril Industries, an American defense technology company
- Andúril, a fictional sword in J. R. R. Tolkien's Middle-earth fantasy writings, originally known as Narsil
- Anduril (workflow engine), an open-source workflow framework
