= C. Lawrence Evans =

- Other name: Larry Evans

Academic background
- Education: University of Rochester

Academic work
- Discipline: Political science
- Sub-discipline: American national institutions
- Institutions: College of William & Mary

C. Lawrence (Larry) Evans is the Newton Family Professor of Government, specializing in the area of American national institutions at the College of William and Mary in Williamsburg, Virginia.

He received a Ph.D. in political science from the University of Rochester (1988). In addition to over two dozen articles and chapters in edited volumes, he is the author of two books: Congress Under Fire: Reform Politics and the Republican Majority, with Walter Oleszek (Houghton Mifflin, 1997), and Leadership in Committee: A Comparative Analysis of Leadership Behavior in the U.S. Senate (U Michigan Press, 1991, 2001).

With the assistance of a grant from the National Science Foundation, Professor Evans is currently conducting research about partisan coalition building in Congress and also is completing a book-length study of floor decision making in the U.S. Senate.

From 1991-93, he served as the staff associate for Chairman Lee H. Hamilton on the Joint Committee on the Organization of Congress. In recent years, he has testified about filibuster reform before the U.S. Senate Committee on Rules and Administration and served as the program evaluator for the orientation conference conducted for newly elected members of the U.S. House of Representatives.

Professor Evans is a former co-editor of the Legislative Studies Quarterly, the premier scholarly journal focusing on legislatures.
