= Ron Link (patient advocate) =

Ron Link is a former firefighter and actor who founded Surgical Eyes in 1999 to help patients with complications from LASIK (laser-assisted in situ keratomileusis) and other types of refractive eye surgery. Surgical Eyes was featured in media outlets worldwide heightening awareness of post-refractive surgery issues as well as possible solutions. Ron Link first spoke in front of the U.S. Food and Drug Administration Ophthalmic Devices Panel about the need to address LASIK complications on July 22, 1999 and again on August 1, 2002.
