= George McCarthy (Caymanian civil servant) =

George McCarthy, OBE is the former Chief Secretary of the Cayman Islands. He served as Financial Secretary for twelve years (from 1992–2004) prior to assuming the post of Chief Secretary in November 2004 until retirement in 2009. The post of Chief Secretary is the second-highest post in the Cayman Islands government and is subordinate only to the governor. He served as the acting Governor of the Cayman Islands from October to November, 2005.

His career as a civil servant started in the Internal Audit Department in 1974. He was promoted several times, moving on to become Deputy Financial Secretary in 1985. Mr. McCarthy qualified as a CPA in 1987 and then spent a few years on secondment to Ernst and Young.

McCarthy was appointed Chairman of the Cayman Islands Monetary Authority in 2009.
