= Kenyon College =

Private college in Gambier, Ohio, US

- Latin: Collegii Kenyonensis
- Motto: Magnanimiter Crucem Sustine (Latin)
- Motto in English: "Valiantly bear the cross"
- Type: Private liberal arts college
- Established: 1824; 202 years ago
- Endowment: $680 million (2025)
- President: Julie Kornfeld
- Academic staff: 213
- Undergraduates: 1,877
- Location: Gambier, Ohio, United States
- Campus: Rural, 1,000 acres (400 ha) including a 700-acre (280 ha) nature preserve
- Newspaper: The Kenyon Collegian
- Colors: Purple and White
- Sporting affiliations: NCAA Division III – NCAC
- Moniker: Owls
- Website: kenyon.edu
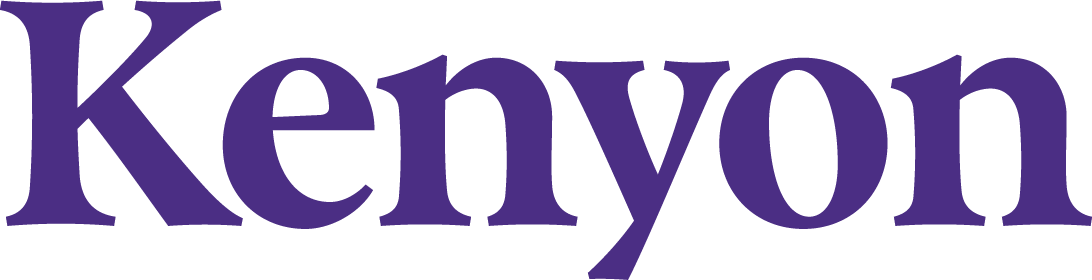
- Kenyon College
- U.S. National Register of Historic Places
- U.S. Historic district
- Location within Ohio Location within the United States
- Location: Gambier, Ohio
- Coordinates: 40°22′35″N 82°23′45″W
- Built: 1824
- Architect: Multiple
- Architectural style: Gothic Revival, Greek Revival
- NRHP reference No.: 75001447
- Added to NRHP: December 6, 1975

Kenyon College (/ˈkɛnjən/ KEN-yən) is a private liberal arts college in Gambier, Ohio, United States. It was founded in 1824 by Episcopal Bishop Philander Chase. It is Ohio's oldest private institution of higher education and enrolls about 1,800 undergraduate students. Students can choose from over 50 majors, minors, and concentrations, including self-designed majors.

The college is on a hill overlooking the Kokosing River and neighbors Mount Vernon, Ohio. Its 1,000-acre (400 ha) campus is set in rural surroundings that host seven ecosystems. There are more than 120 student clubs and organizations. Kenyon athletes are called Owls and compete in the NCAA Division III North Coast Athletic Conference. Kenyon College is accredited by the Higher Learning Commission.

== History ==
=== Founding ===
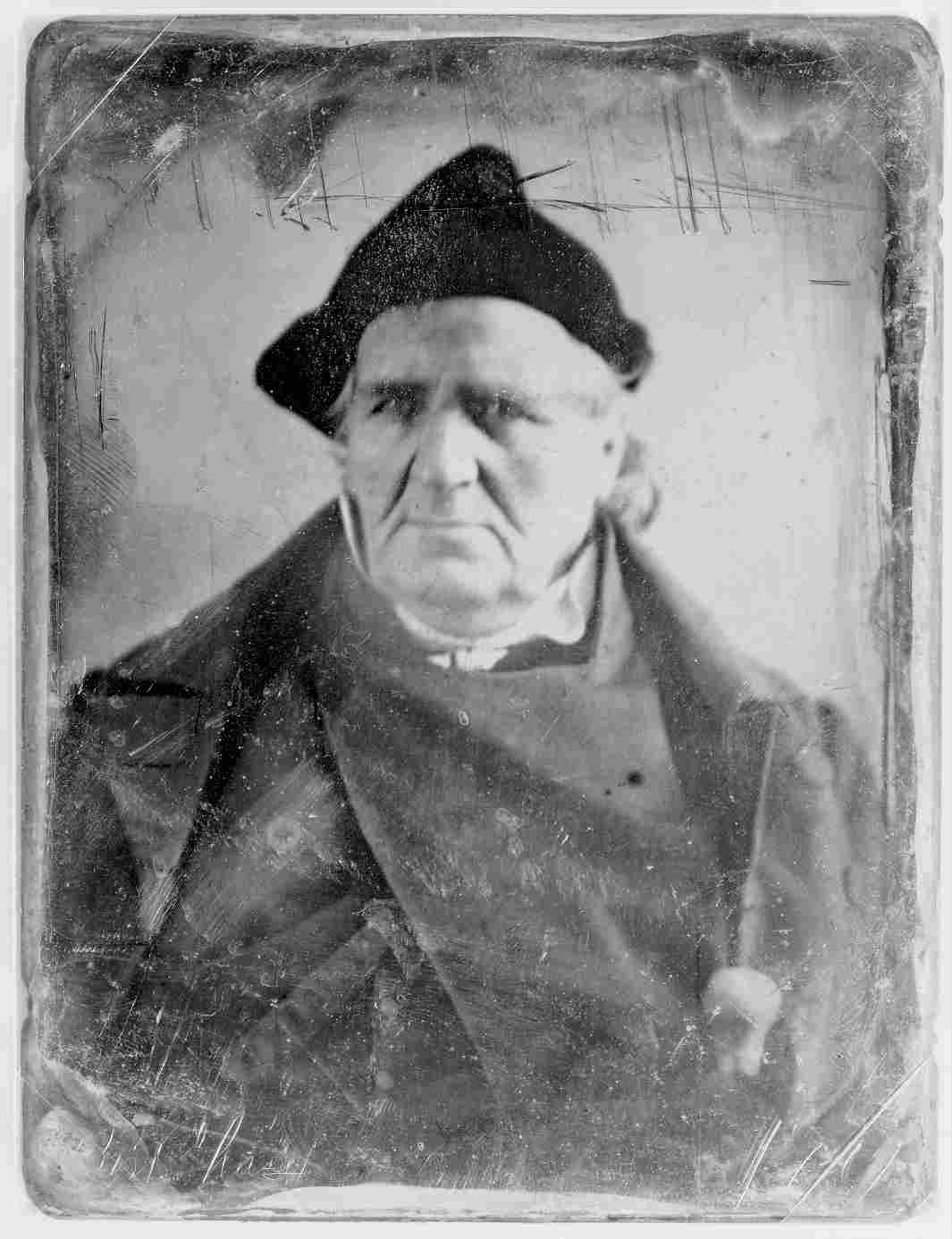
Philander Chase (1775–1852) was the founder and first president of Bexley Hall and Kenyon College, and later became Presiding Bishop of The Episcopal Church

After becoming the first Episcopal Bishop of Ohio in 1818, Philander Chase found a severe lack of trained clergy on the Ohio frontier. He sailed to England and solicited donations from George Kenyon, Lord Gambier, and the writer and philanthropist Hannah More. The college was incorporated in December 1824. Dissatisfied with its original location in Worthington, Chase bought 8,000 acres (3,200 ha) of land in Knox County (with the Mount Vernon lawyer Henry Curtis), and reached what he named Gambier Hill on July 24, 1825.

=== The Kenyon Review ===
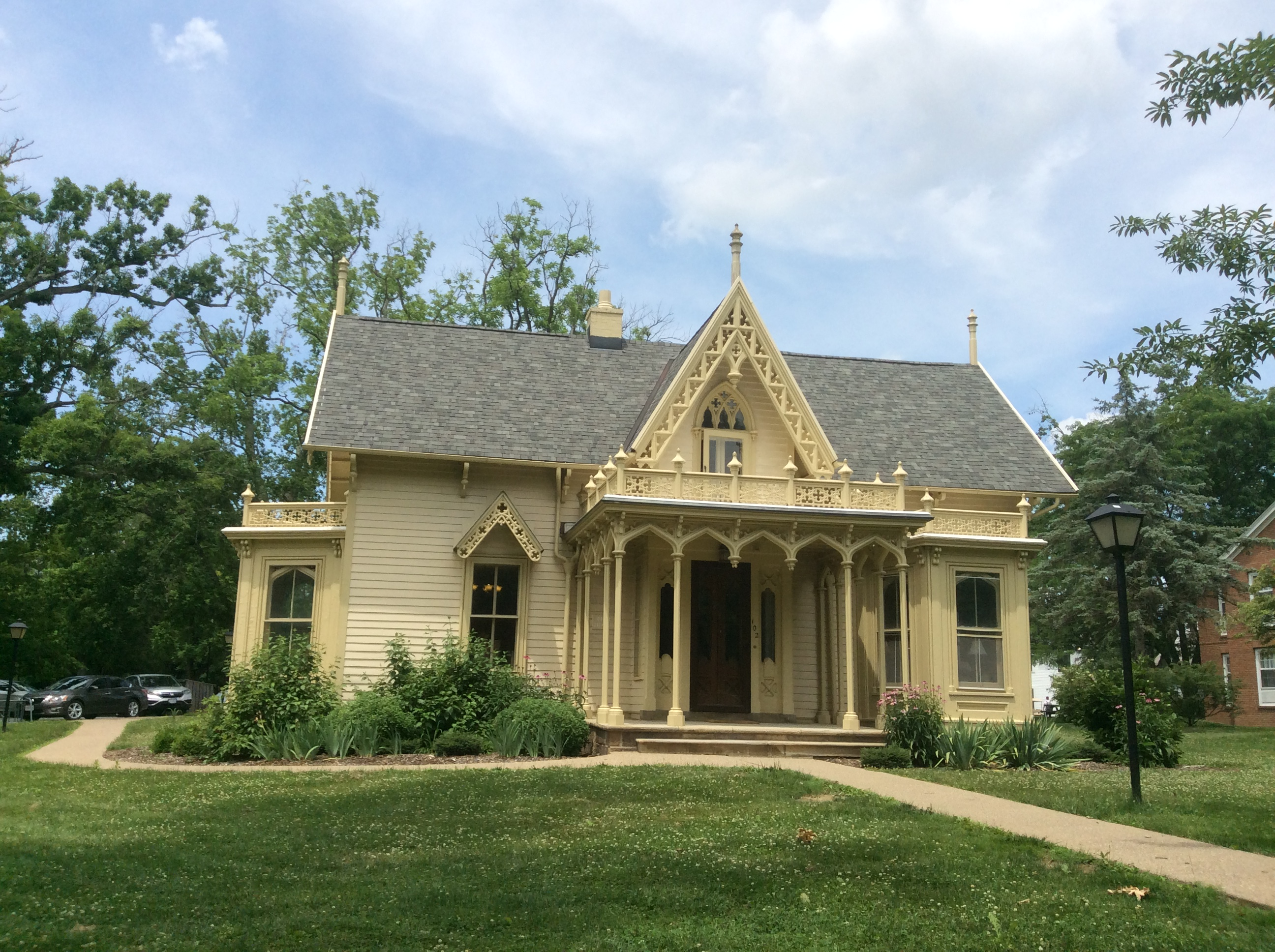
Finn House, location of The Kenyon Review

Kenyon's English department gained national recognition with the 1937 arrival of the poet and critic John Crowe Ransom as professor of poetry and first editor of The Kenyon Review, a literary journal. During his 21-year tenure, Ransom published work by Allen Tate, Robert Penn Warren, William Empson, Mark Van Doren, Kenneth Burke, and Delmore Schwartz, as well as younger writers Flannery O'Connor, Robert Lowell, and Peter Taylor, among others. It was an influential literary magazine during the 1940s and 1950s.

The Kenyon Review hosts a two-week summer writing workshop on campus for high-school students and sponsors an annual summer writer's workshop for adults. The Review also operates the KR Associates Program, through which Kenyon students gain experience in literary editing, publishing, and programming. Student associates work with Kenyon Review staff in manuscript evaluation, publicity and marketing, and event planning, among other creative and editorial projects.

== Academics ==
Kenyon is a four-year liberal arts college. There are 18 academic departments, 14 interdisciplinary programs, and more than 50 majors, minors, and concentrations. Kenyon requires students to take classes in each of four academic divisions: fine arts, humanities, natural sciences, and social sciences. In addition, students must study a foreign language. Its 2021 graduates' most popular majors were English, economics, psychology, political science, and biology. The academic year has two four-course semesters, as well as research opportunities in the natural sciences, humanities, social sciences, and fine arts during the summer.

Kenyon's faculty includes over 200 full-time professors, with 99% of faculty holding a Ph.D. or other terminal degree in their field. All courses are taught by professors, with a student-to-faculty-ratio of 10:1.

Kenyon claims to offer more than 190 study abroad programs in 50 different countries. There is a program at the University of Exeter and one in Rome.

Kenyon's Center for the Study of American Democracy (CSAD), established in 2007, organizes conferences and seminars to promote nonpartisan civic and political discourse. Students can join the Center as Associates, serving as student advisors, organizing events, and encouraging greater participation on campus in the center's programs. CSAD was funded by a grant from the National Endowment for the Humanities.

The Gund Gallery, a 31,000 square feet (2,900 m^{2}) visual arts center and exhibition space, opened in 2011. It hosts lectures, public programming, and exhibitions from traveling shows and its permanent collection.

== Admissions ==
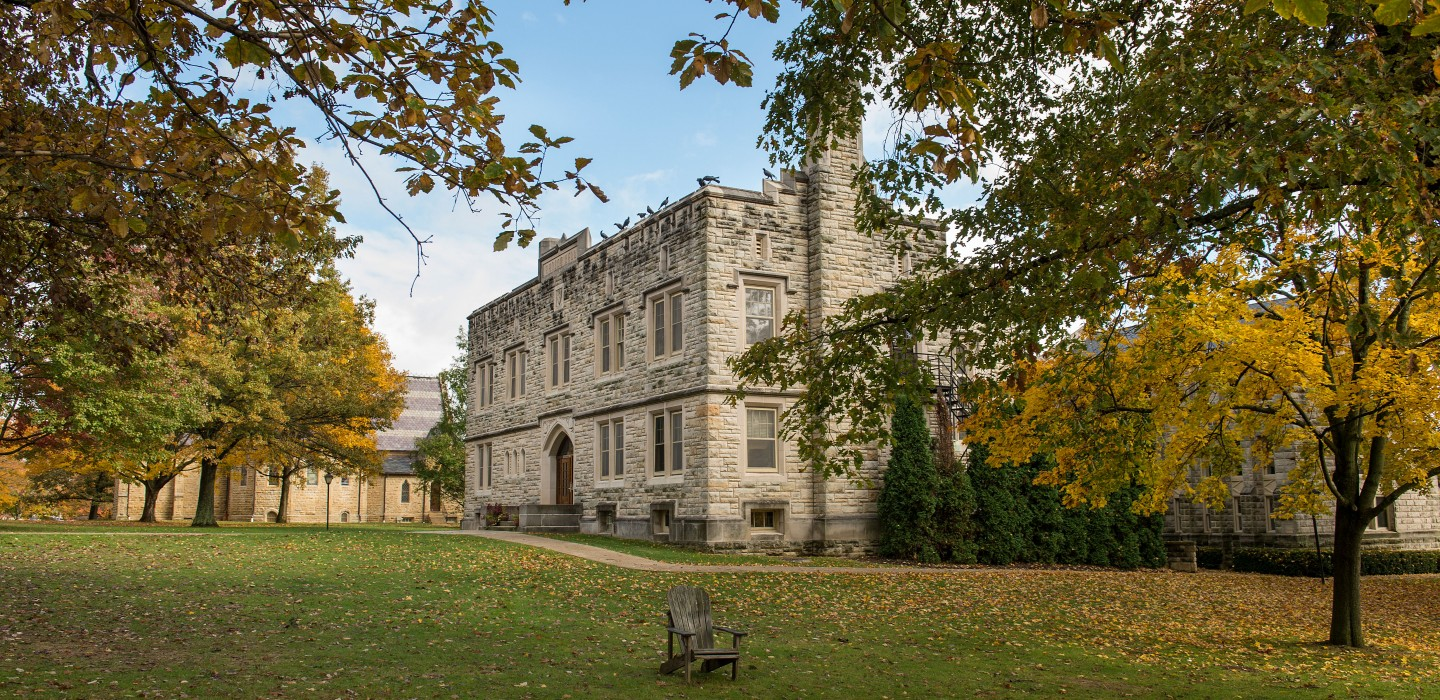
Ransom Hall (1910–1912), locations of the Office of the President

Admission to Kenyon is considered "most selective" by U.S. News & World Report.

For the class of 2022 (enrolling fall 2018), Kenyon received 6,152 applications, accepted 2,204 (35.8%), and enrolled 539. For enrolled first-year students the middle 50% range of SAT scores was 640–730 for critical reading and 640–740 for math, while the ACT composite range was 29–33; the average GPA was 3.94.

== Rankings ==
Academic rankings

Liberal arts
- U.S. News & World Report: 45
- Washington Monthly: 92

National
- Forbes: 140
- WSJ/College Pulse: 93

In 2006, Newsweek selected Kenyon College as one of 25 "New Ivies" on the basis of admissions statistics as well as interviews with administrators, students, faculty members, and alumni. It was also listed in Greene's list of "Hidden Ivies" in 2000. Time's 2018–2019 "Best Colleges in America" report ranked Kenyon the 214th-best college in the country.

In the 2025 U.S. News & World Report rankings, Kenyon was tied for the 45th-best liberal arts college in the U.S. In the 2025 Forbes rankings, it ranked 33rd among liberal arts colleges and 140th among 500 colleges and universities in the U.S. In 2022, CollegeSimply ranked Kenyon as Ohio's second-best institution of higher education and the 61st-best college or university overall.

Previously, Kenyon gained national recognition for LGBTQ inclusion. It was ranked as one of the best campuses for LGBTQ students in the country in both 2020 and 2021. It did not retain this ranking in 2022.

Although Kenyon is often ranked favorably, some methods that rank colleges based on their calculated return on investment (ROI) have been critical of Kenyon's value. The 2018 Payscale College ROI Report ranked Kenyon as the 983rd best value college in the country.

== Student media ==
=== Campus newspaper ===
The Kenyon Collegian is Kenyon College's official student newspaper. Founded in 1856, the paper is staffed entirely by Kenyon undergraduates and is published weekly.

=== Political and cultural magazines ===
The Kenyon Observer, founded in 1989 by David Horner and Alex Novak, began as a conservative political journal. After it briefly ceased publication in 2009, it was reestablished in 2011 by students Jonathan Green and Gabriel Rom and featured contributions from students of all political ideologies. As of 2025, all members have graduated and the paper is defunct.

David Skinner, an Observer alumnus, worked as editor of Humanities. Evan McLaren, a prominent white nationalist and director of the National Policy Institute, was a major contributor to the Observer and its editor-in-chief from 2007 to 2008.

Paths Magazine, founded in 2024, serves the Kenyon College community as a biannual political and social sciences magazine. It was created after The Kenyon Observer became defunct, and aims to balance political ideologies.

== Traditions ==
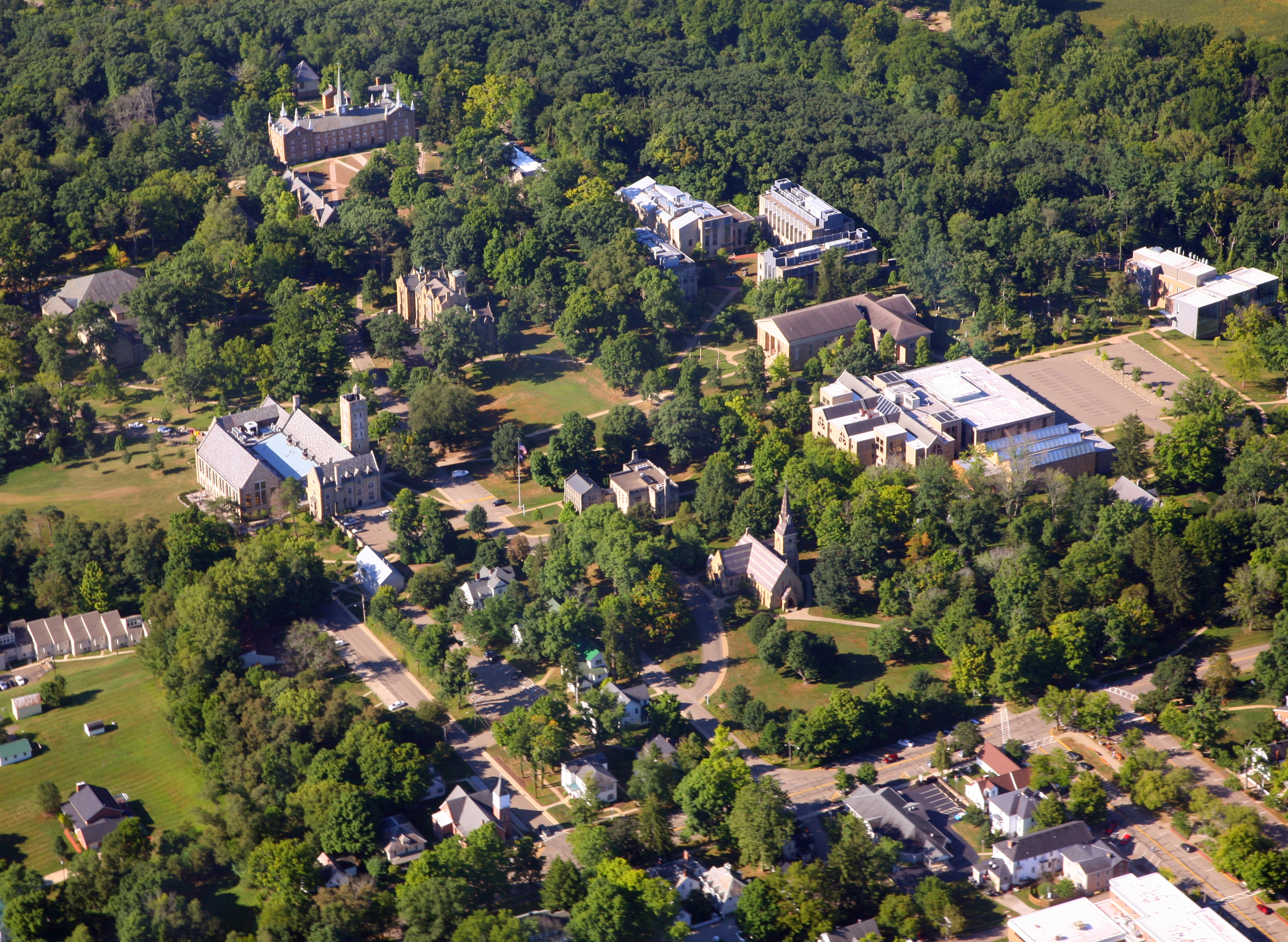
Aerial view of Kenyon's campus

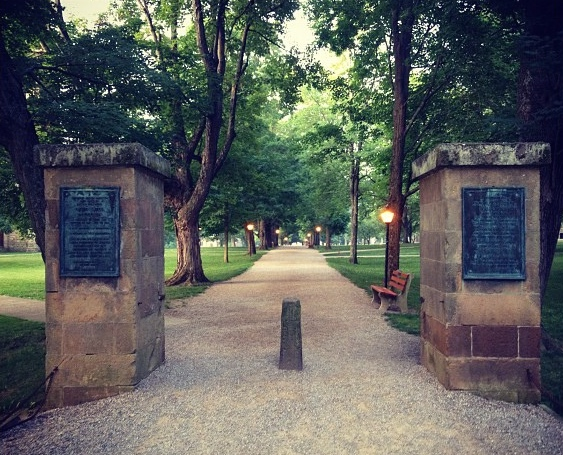
"Middle Path" runs two-thirds of a mile through the campus

Kenyon is Ohio's oldest private college and has traditions dating back almost 200 years. All incoming students are expected to take the Matriculation Oath and sign a Matriculation Book, as they have done for over a century.

Another tradition is the "First-Year Sing". Each year, entering first-years gather on the steps of Rosse Hall to sing Kenyon songs to officially become part of the Kenyon community. On the day before commencement, seniors gather on the steps of Rosse Hall to sing the same songs again.

Kenyon students avoid stepping on the college seal in Peirce Dining Hall's entrance hall. Tradition holds that if someone steps on the seal, they will not graduate from the college within four years.

The Church of the Holy Spirit, one of Kenyon's oldest structures, has a 10-bell set of chimes that ring the traditional Westminster Quarters. The bells, installed in 1879, are rung manually in the bell tower each Friday by a campus group called the Kenyon Pealers.

When a new college president takes office, candles are lit in every window of Old Kenyon as a sign of welcome. A bell in the steeple of Old Kenyon is rung only when a new president is inaugurated, when the U.S. is no longer engaged in a war, or when Kenyon's football team wins a home game. Kenyon has had 25 presidents (including acting or interim appointments); S. Georgia Nugent was its first female president and Sean Decatur was its first African-American president. The president's academic regalia is a purple gown with four velvet chevrons on each sleeve signifying the office of the president, a college seal medallion with the names of each Kenyon president on the chain links, and a purple beefeater cap. College trustees also wear the caps at ceremonies.

The college's official song is "The Thrill", but "Kokosing Farewell" is more often sung at ceremonies. Sung to the tune of the 1870 hymn "The Day Thou Gavest, Lord, Is Ending", "Kokosing Farewell" is the traditional closing number at Kenyon College Chamber Singers concerts.

The college maintains a tradition of formality at ceremonies. During the commencement ceremony, the conferring of degrees to the class and announcement of each student's degree of Bachelor of Arts is done in Latin. Kenyon's diplomas are also in Latin.

== Shield and seal ==
The first Kenyon seal was designed no later than 1842 and contained a book, a cross, a scroll, a telescope, and a scientific apparatus surrounded by the words "Sigillum Collegi Kenyonensis" and "Ohio Resp". Since the second and current seal was introduced, the first has rarely been used.

Kenyon's second and current shield derives from the coat of arms of Lord Kenyon, one of the college's first and most prominent benefactors. It consists of a chevron, three crosses, and a book inscribed with the college's motto (as well as the Kenyon family's motto) magnanimiter crucem sustine ("valiantly bear the cross") resting upon a bishop's staff, representing the college's founder, Bishop Philander Chase. The shield is a widely used symbol of the college. A version that replaces the book and staff with "Kenyon" in block letters has become the symbol of the college's athletic teams.

In 2011, American clothier Ralph Lauren discontinued production of a necktie depicting the Kenyon shield after it was found it had not licensed the rights from the college.

The Bexley Seminary had its own shield until its dissociation from the college in 1968. While it contained the book, motto, and bishop's staff of the Kenyon shield, an eagle and ermine pattern blazoned the lower portion of the shield.

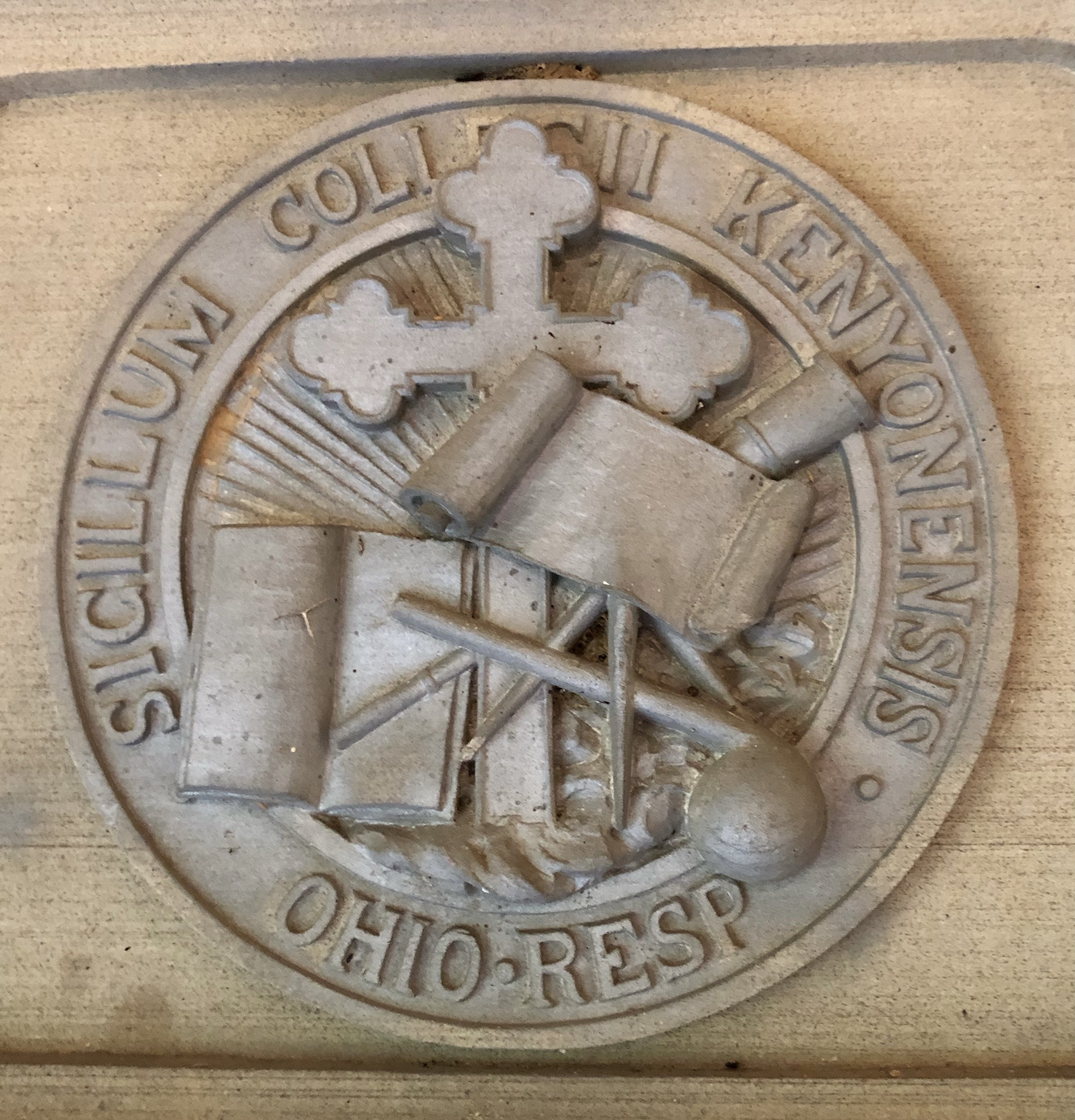
Kenyon's First Seal

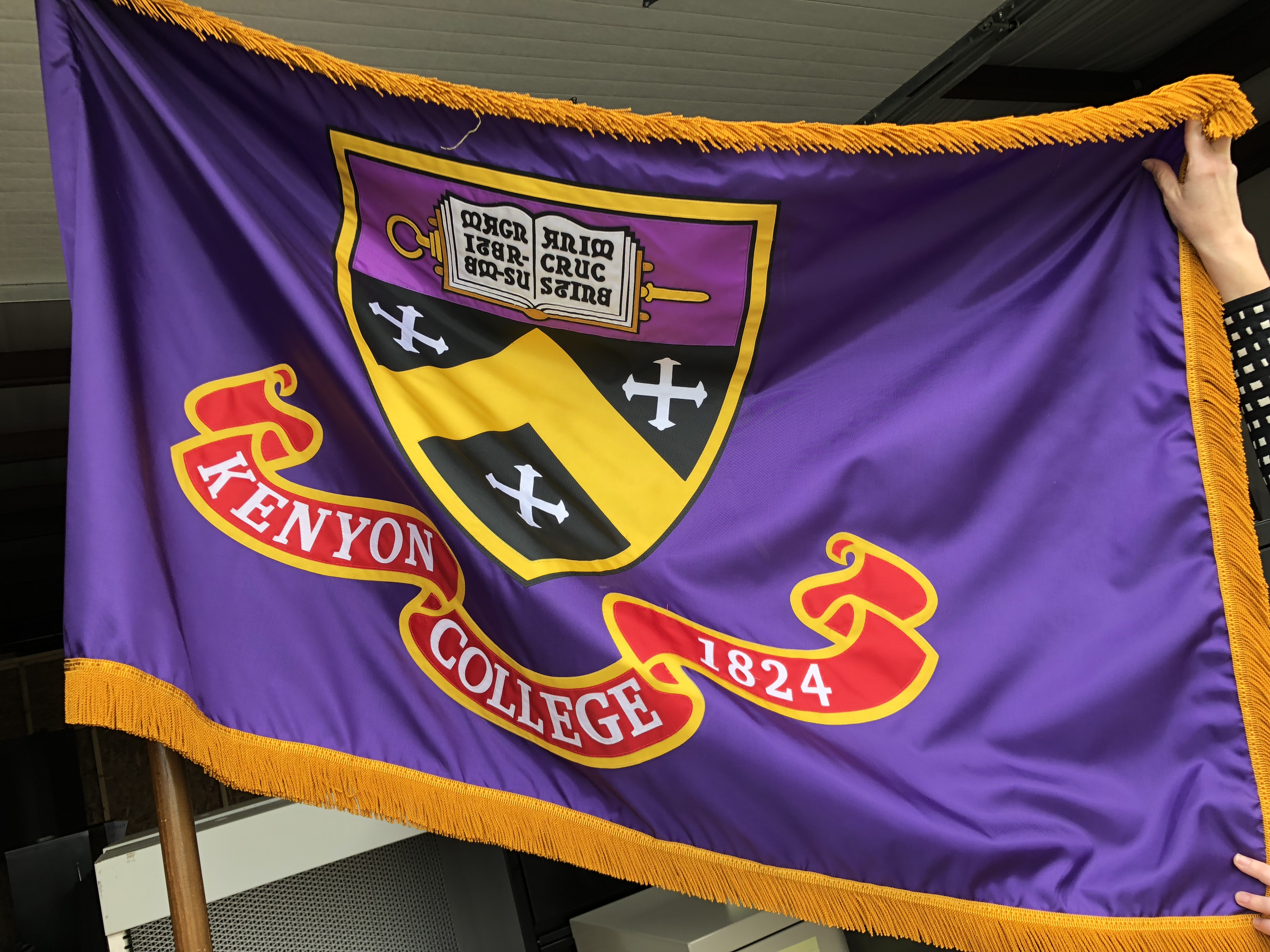
Flag of Kenyon College with shield

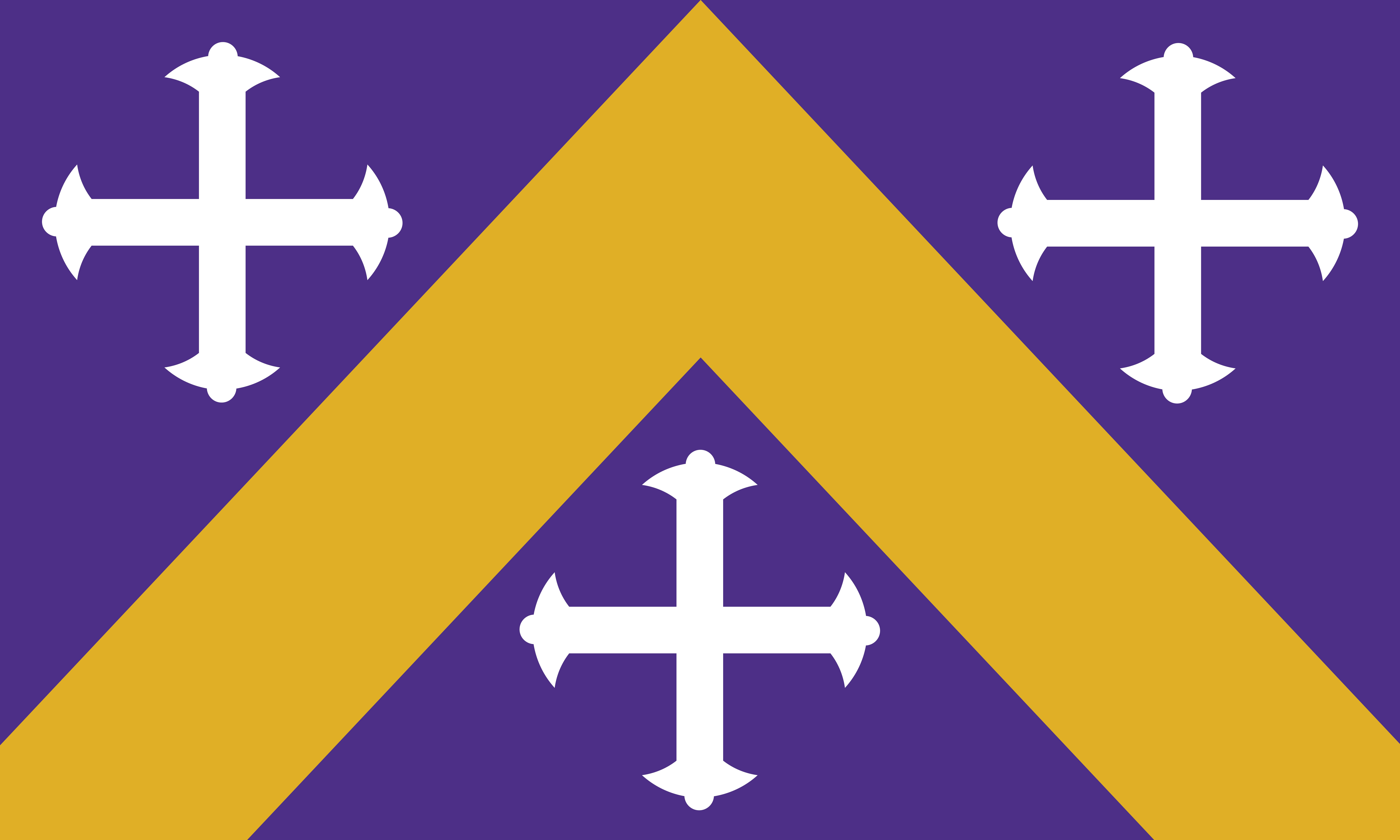
A flag variant used by some students

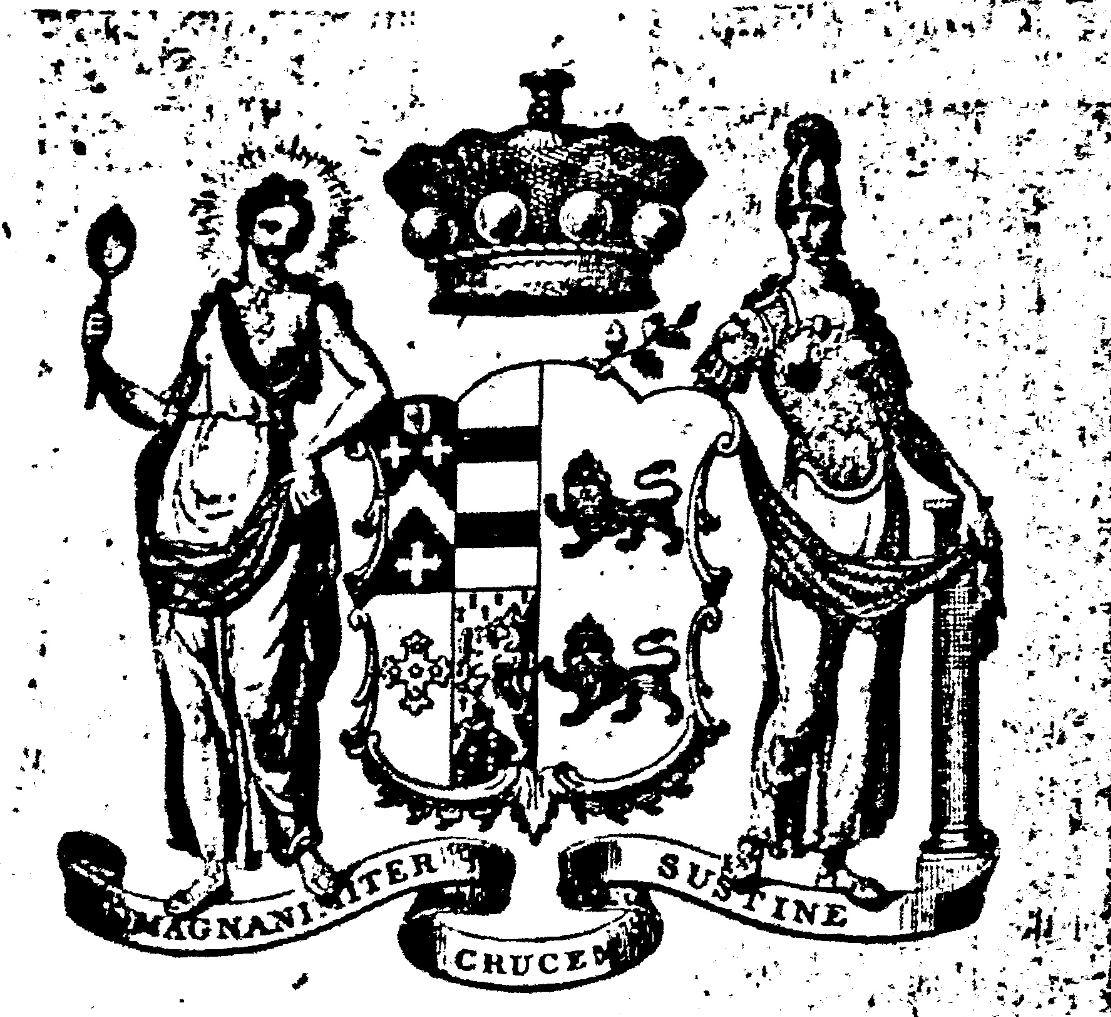
Coat of Arms of Lord Kenyon

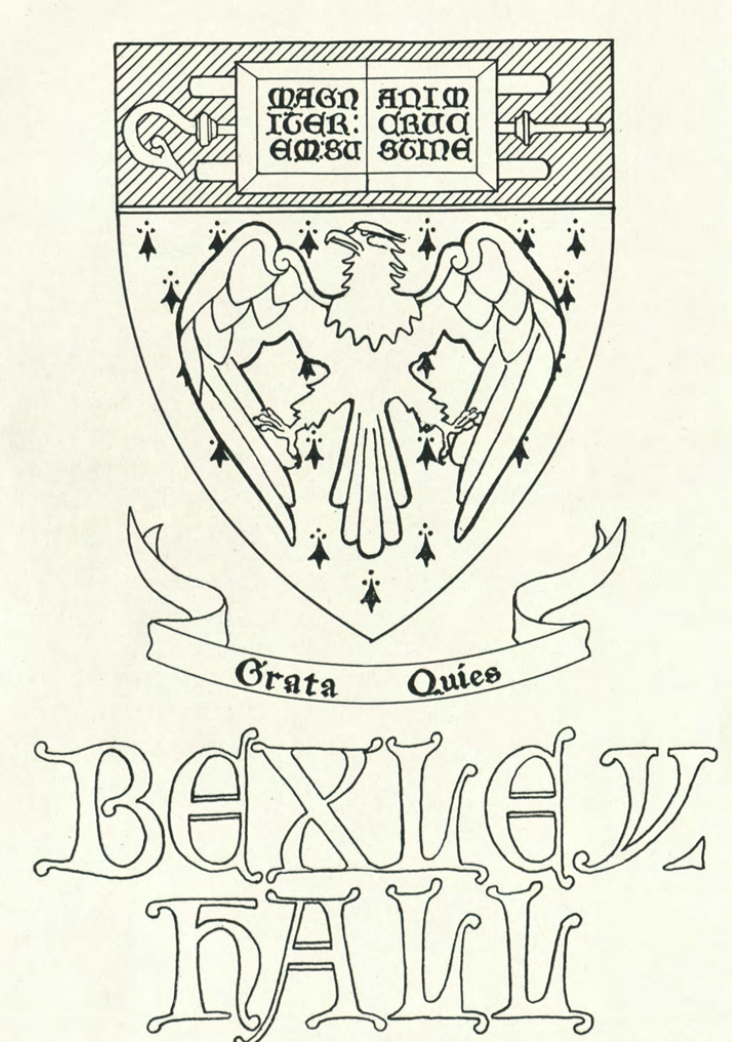
Shield of the Seminary at Bexley Hall

== Sustainability ==
Kenyon College has undertaken several sustainability initiatives, including a recycling system upgrade, a biodiesel project, a computer lab conversion to double-sided printing, distribution of green living guides, and a dining hall composting system that diverts 6,000 pounds of waste from the landfill weekly. Kenyon's cafeteria is committed to serving local food and has become a leader among college cafeterias in the country. Students partnered with administrators and professors to complete a campus energy audit for three years as well as a carbon footprint calculation.

Kenyon Green Alumni was founded to connect graduates "with a professional interest in the environment". The college received a "C" grade on the 2010 College Sustainability Report Card, compiled by the Sustainable Endowments Institute.

The Kenyon Farm was a mixed crop-livestock operation providing produce to local markets and giving students the opportunity to gain practical skills and knowledge for small-scale farming. The farm was controversially shut down in 2022, leading student workers to consider unionizing. The farm's closure was later compared to the closure of The Homestead at Denison University.

Ivy, which once covered some buildings on the Kenyon campus, but damages stonework, has been eradicated.

== Athletics ==
Kenyon athletics shield

Kenyon's sports teams, which compete in the North Coast Athletic Conference (NCAC), were referred to as the Lords and Ladies until 2022 when a new nickname, the Owls, was adopted. At various points in the past, the teams were also known as the Mauve, the Purple, the Purple and White, the Hilltoppers, and simply as Kenyon.

The men's swim team, in NCAA Division III, claims to have won, from 1980 through 2010, a record 31 consecutive NCAA national championships as well as consecutive titles between 2012 and 2015 for a total of 34 program titles. The women's swim team has won 24 non-consecutive titles of their own since 1984, the most recent being in 2022.

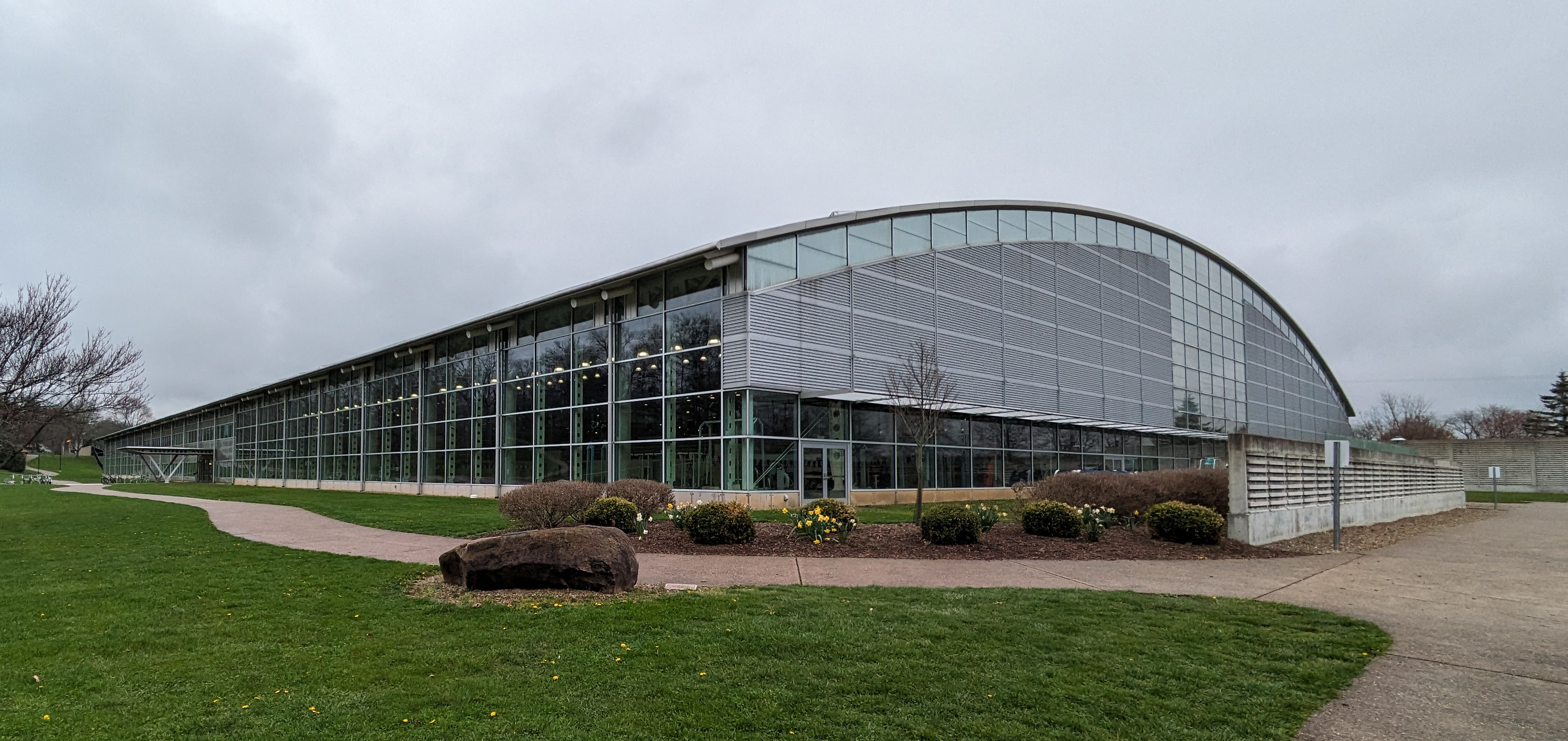
Lowry Center, Kenyon's main sports facility

In 2006, Kenyon opened the Kenyon Athletic Center (now the Lowry Center), a 263,000-square-foot (24,400 m^{2}) building. The building was named after William E. Lowry Jr., who served on Kenyon’s Board of Trustees for more than 30 years. He also captained the football, baseball, and basketball teams and presided the student body.

Football, field hockey, and lacrosse are played at McBride Field, which has a seating capacity of 1,762.

In 2019, Kenyon was one of the first National Collegiate Athletic Association (NCAA) member colleges to participate in the organization's LGBTQ OneTeam Program, which launched in fall 2019.

== Notable alumni ==
Notable alumni of Kenyon College include:

- U.S. Supreme Court Justice David Davis (1832)
- U.S. Secretary of War Edwin M. Stanton (1834)
- Abolitionist and women's rights activist John Celivergos Zachos (1840)
- U.S. Supreme Court Justice Stanley Matthews (1840)
- U.S. President Rutherford B. Hayes (1842)
- Poet Robert Lowell (1940)
- Writer Peter Taylor (1940)
- U.S. Supreme Court Justice William Rehnquist (attended, 1946)
- Novelist William H. Gass (1947)
- Swedish Prime Minister Olof Palme (1948)
- Actor Paul Newman (1949)
- Comedian Jonathan Winters (attended, 1950)
- Novelist E.L. Doctorow (1952)
- Poet James Arlington Wright (1952)
- Molecular biologist Harvey Lodish (1962)
- Architect Graham Gund (1963)
- Cartoonist Jim Borgman (1976)
- Matthew Winkler (journalist) (1977)
- Professor of Law Amos N. Guiora (1979)
- Cartoonist Bill Watterson (1980)
- Author Donovan Webster (1981)
- Actor Allison Janney (1982)
- U.S. Congressman Zack Space (1983)
- Author Laura Hillenbrand (1989)
- U.S. Ambassador to Ukraine Bridget A. Brink (1991)
- Football coach Chris Creighton (1991)
- Author Jenna Blum (1992)
- Photographer and film director Jonathan Mannion (1993)
- Politician Leopoldo Lopez (1993)
- Actor and filmmaker Josh Radnor (1996)
- U.S. Congresswoman Lizzie Pannill Fletcher (1997)
- Lawyer and climate activist Colette Pichon Battle (1997)
- Basketball coach Shaka Smart (1999)
- Author John Green (2000)
- Legal scholar Aaron Perzanowski (2001)
- Author and filmmaker Ransom Riggs (2001)
- President and Chief Strategy officer of Anduril Christian Brose (2002)
- Political strategist Sarah Longwell (2002)
- Entrepreneur Juul James Monsees (2002)
- U.S. National Security Council spokesperson Tommy Vietor (2002)
- Astrophysicist and artist Nia Imara (2003)
- Entrepreneur and media executive Matthew Segal (2008)
- Musician Nicholas Petricca (2009)
- First Bishop of Ohio Sylvester Rosecrans
- Musician Evan Stephens Hall (2011)
- Commissioner of the New York City Department of Parks and Recreation Tricia Shimamura (2011)
- Musician Justin Roberts (1992)
- Media executive Hugh Forrest (1984)
- Screenwriter and playwright Will Arbery (2011)
- Theatre director Knud Adams (2009)
