= Deryck J. van Rensburg =

- Born: c. 1960
- Education: Rhodes University; University of South Africa; University of Bath; University of Manchester
- Occupations: Business executive, academic
- Known for: dean of Pepperdine University's Graziadio School of Business and Management
- Spouse: Rozanne van Rensburg
- Children: 3 sons, 1 daughter

Deryck J. van Rensburg (born c. 1960) is a South African, British and U.S. business executive and academic. He is the dean of the Graziadio Business School at Pepperdine University.

== Early life ==
Van Rensburg was born circa 1960 in South Africa. He graduated from Rhodes University and the University of South Africa, where he earned bachelor's degrees. He earned a master of business administration from the University of Bath followed by a doctor of business administration from the University of Manchester.

== Career ==
Van Rensburg worked for Unilever and The Coca-Cola Company for three decades. In his last role he was President of Global Ventures for Coca-Cola reporting to the Chairman and CEO.

Van Rensburg has served as the dean of Pepperdine University's Graziadio Business School since November 2016. He has published academic articles in Management Decision, the Journal of Business Strategy, the International Entrepreneurship and Management Journal, and Industrial Marketing Management.

== Personal life ==
Van Rensburg has a wife, Rozanne, three sons and a daughter.
