= Pepperdine Libraries =

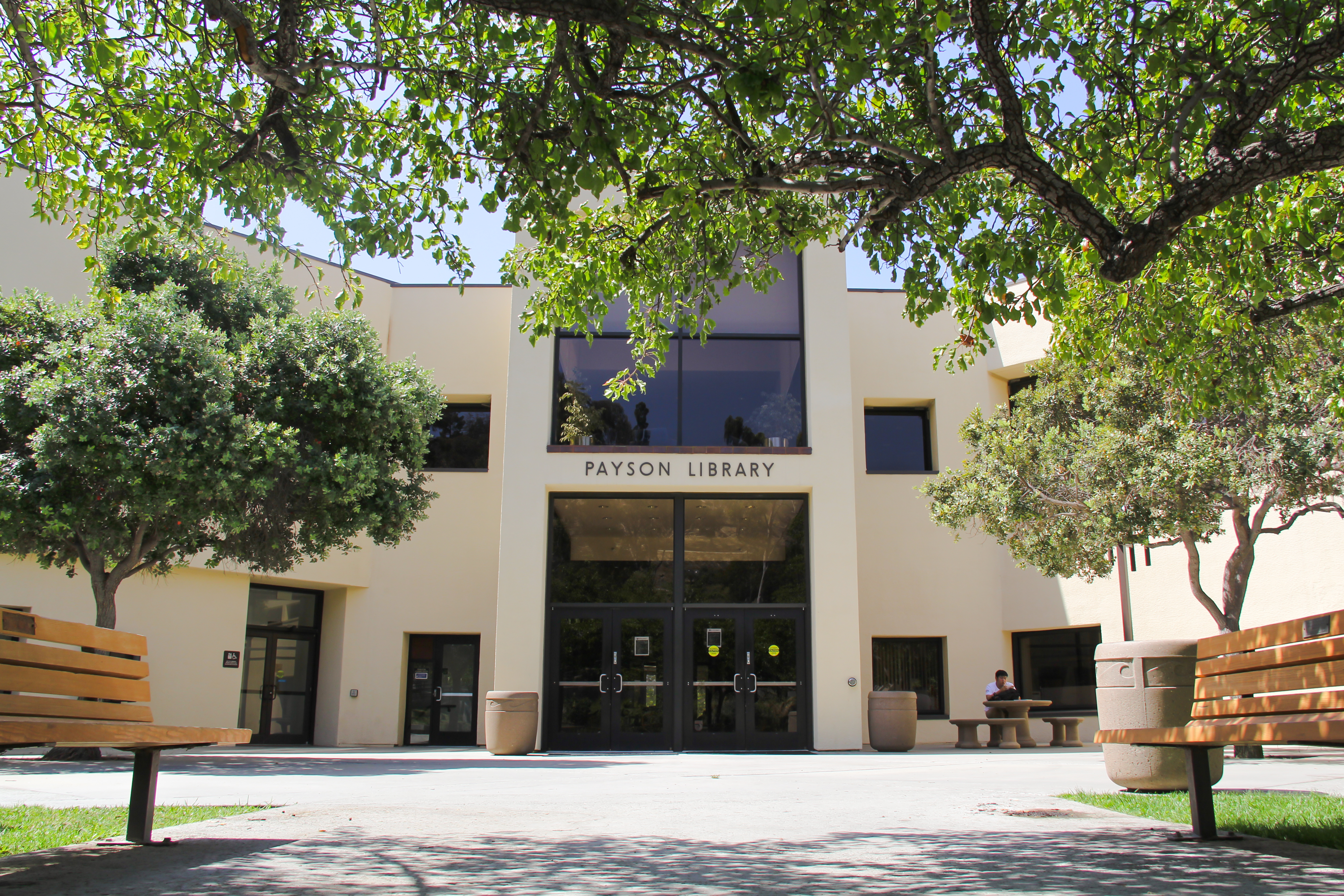
Payson Library

Pepperdine Libraries is the collective name for all of Pepperdine University's academic libraries. Pepperdine Libraries has a collection of over 1 million physical books and periodicals, 1.5 million full-text articles via 150 electronic databases, rare books, and a digital press. The main branch, Payson Library, is home to Pepperdine Libraries' Special Collections, with collections such as University Archives, the Malibu Historical Collection, the John Mazza Collection of Historic Surfboards, and the Churches of Christ Heritage Center.

Pepperdine Libraries has a presence at five of Pepperdine's California campuses, including Seaver College (Payson Library), Drescher Graduate Campus in Malibu, West Los Angeles, Irvine, and Calabasas; there are also libraries located at Pepperdine's international sites in Buenos Aires, Florence, Heidelberg, Lausanne, London, and Shanghai. Pepperdine's School of Law library, the Jerene Appleby Harnish Law Library, runs as its own entity, separate from the other Pepperdine Libraries.

== History ==
George Pepperdine founded Pepperdine College, located on South Vermont and 79th Street in South Central Los Angeles, in 1937. The original library, known as the Pepperdine College Library, opened in the summer of 1939. The building was designed by architect Henry L. Gogerty, in the Streamline Moderne style, similar to other buildings on the original campus.

In the early 1970s, the college opened a new campus in Malibu, having been offered 138 acres of land from the Rindge-Adamson family. The Malibu campus began construction on April 13, 1971, and Payson Library, the main branch of five Pepperdine University library branches in Southern California, was built in large part due to a $4 million donation from Joan Whitney Payson, majority owner of the New York Mets from 1962 until 1975, and her husband, Charles Shipman Payson.

In 1984, Pepperdine launched “The Wave of Excellence” campaign, which provided funding for Payson Library to accommodate computers and the construction of a new entrance. The library building that resulted from that campaign is the building students and faculty know today.

== Collections ==
Pepperdine Libraries has the following holdings:

- Book volumes: 350,467
- Periodicals: 1,515
- Music scores: 3,287

== Services, Special Collections and University Archives ==
=== Services ===
Pepperdine University Libraries has a variety of services common to libraries. Pepperdine Libraries manages and maintains InfoGuides, the library's instance of the SpringShare software, LibGuides, which provide useful resources for various subjects, classes, and fields of study. Study Rooms are also available for students, which can be reserved online. The library also has course reserves, with a variety of resources available for students to use. Pepperdine Libraries also lends out Mac and PC laptops for students to use to complete work, and are available for 24 hours. In addition to print materials, Pepperdine Libraries has access to thousands of electronic resources, including databases, journals and newspapers, eBooks, and streaming videos and music. For materials not available in Pepperdine Libraries' collection, Interlibrary Loan services are available to obtain these items.

Other services include:

- Reference help via text, email, and chat
- Tutoring for writing and speech
- Computers with latest Adobe Creative software
- Lectures, book-signings, workshops, exhibitions, and other community events
- "Digital Learning Lab" for information literacy courses

Throughout their six California branches, Pepperdine Libraries has a total of 19 librarians and 14 full-time staff members. The Dean of Libraries is Dr. Mark Roosa.

=== Digital Library ===
In addition to traditional library services, Pepperdine University Libraries also incorporates new technologies to widen to scope of access to their resources. In 2010, Pepperdine Libraries initiated Pepperdine Digital Collections, "a project designed to facilitate the discovery of and access to a wide variety of digital materials drawn from Pepperdine's unique archival holdings." Such digital collections include the Korean War Photography of Hanson A. Williams, Jr., Eric Wienberg Collection of Malibu Matchbooks, Postcards, and Collectables, and digitized versions of The Malibu Times, Malibu's longest running newspaper.

Pepperdine Libraries also publishes a variety of materials through Pepperdine Digital Commons, described as "an e-publication and digital archiving platform for the scholarly output of Pepperdine's vibrant academic community, including journals, faculty webpages, conference proceedings, exemplary student research, and more." Pepperdine Digital Commons hosts original Pepperdine Journals, including Global Tides, Pepperdine Law Review, and Pepperdine Journal of Communication Research, as well as works published by faculty, staff, and even students, known as the SelectedWorks gallery.

=== Special Collections and University Archives ===
Pepperdine Libraries has rare and special collections that provide research opportunities and experiences for patrons.

The rare books collection includes works on all topics, but is particularly strong in the areas of religion, history, and literature. Some significant rare book collections at Pepperdine Libraries include the Mlynarski Collection of Books on 19th-Century Paris, the Metcalf Collection of Books on T. E. Lawrence, the Helen Pepperdine Collection of Children's Books, a collection of fine press books, and a collection of 17th-century books and pamphlets related to the Christian Sabbath.

In celebration of its 75th year, Pepperdine acquired a “Heritage Edition” of the Saint John's Bible, the “first completely handwritten and illuminated Bible to have been commissioned by a Benedictine Abbey since the invention of the printing press.” The collection has been used “with the goal of integrating the Bible into the academic and spiritual life of our community.”

The archival collections at Pepperdine Libraries include “historic archival materials related to the history of Malibu, the University, the Churches of Christ, film and television, and other areas.” Pepperdine Libraries maintains a site on the Online Archive of California, where all of the finding aids for the archival collections can be found. Many archival materials have been digitized and can be found in the Pepperdine Digital Collection.

=== Malibu Historical Collection ===
The Malibu Historical Collection focuses on materials relating to the history and heritage of Malibu, including historical books, local newspapers such as the Malibu Surfside News and the Malibu Times, and the papers of the Rindge-Adamson family, who helped to establish Malibu.

The John Mazza Collection of Historic Surfboards has over two dozen surfboards, ranging in styles and lengths. One notable board is the “Gidget” board, which was shaped by Dale Velzy and used in both the Gidget 1959 film and 1965 television series; the board is signed by Velzy, Kathy Kohner-Zuckerman (whose diaries inspired the character Gidget), and Sally Field, who played Gidget in the television series.

=== Churches of Christ Heritage Center ===
Pepperdine University is affiliated with the Churches of Christ, and Payson Library has an expansive collection of materials relating to this religious tradition, known as Churches of Christ Heritage Center. The collection, curated and directed by Dr. Jerry Rushford, is a repository of books, documents, photographs, religious periodicals, congregational histories, biographical studies, archival materials and artifacts of the Stone-Campbell Restoration Movement and the Churches of Christ. The Heritage Center is dedicated to the acquisition and preservation of these materials and to the promotion of research of this religious movement.

Scholarly attention to the Stone-Campbell Restoration Movement makes the work of the Heritage Center vital to the self-understanding of Churches of Christ and the understanding others have of this movement. The Heritage Center also performs an essential role in support of the mission of Pepperdine University as it seeks to preserve and strengthen the University's historic ties to Churches of Christ.

The Heritage Center will continue to solicit materials—especially out-of-print books, unique photographs, and rare archival items—on the history of Churches of Christ and the Stone-Campbell Restoration Movement as part of its ongoing mission.

== Renovation ==
In May 2016, Pepperdine University Libraries began a 15-month renovation of its main undergraduate facility, Payson Library. The renovation expanded study spaces, enhanced environments for using and storing special collections, established a makerspace and 3D printing lab, and created new spaces where "faculty and students can engage.” These plans were inspired by President Andrew K. Benton's directive “to create our 21st-century Library of the Future.” The renovations included "additional enhancements" such as a coffee shop, a "Student Success Center, and a Math and Sciences Collaborative Learning space."

During the renovation, Pepperdine Libraries set up two temporary library spaces, known as "The Library Hub." The Library Hub at TAC (Thornton Administrative Center) offered computer workstations, study rooms, and open study places for students, as well as a small portion of Payson's collection. In addition Pepperdine Libraries also set up a presence at Pepperdine's newly opened Calabasas building, known as The Library Hub at Calabasas. The Library Hub at Calabasas contained most of Payson's book collections during the renovation. The space also provided study rooms, printers and copiers, and reference assistance. The Library Hub at Calabasas is currently only open to Pepperdine students, faculty, and staff.

In August 2017, Payson Library officially reopened its doors to patrons. The new space has twice as many study rooms and quiet study areas, as well as an updated and expanded Heritage Center. A new makerspace, called the Genesis Lab, allows students to use innovative tools such as 3D printing and virtual reality equipment. The special collections wing of the library was renamed the Boone Special Collections and Archives (named after singer, philanthropist, and friend of Pepperdine Pat Boone), and features state-of-the-art preservation technology, reading and seminar rooms, and exhibits of special materials. In addition to architectural design changes and a reconfiguration of the space, a Starbucks coffeeshop was added to the building. On September 17, 2017, the university held its official grand reopening for Payson, where donors and other contributors were thanked.
