= Hugh M. Tiner =

American academic administrator (1908–1981)

Hugh Marvin Tiner

President of Pepperdine University
- In office 1939–1957
- Preceded by: Batsell Baxter
- Succeeded by: M. Norvel Young

Personal details
- Born: April 16, 1908 La Vernia, Texas, U.S.
- Died: January 7, 1981 (aged 72) Long Beach, California, U.S.
- Education: Abilene Christian University (BA); Stanford University (MA); University of Southern California (PhD)

Hugh M. Tiner (April 16, 1908 – January 7, 1981) was an American academic administrator. He served as the second president of Pepperdine University from 1939 to 1957.

== Early life ==
Tiner was born on April 16, 1908, in La Vernia, Texas. He graduated from Abilene Christian College in 1928, and he earned a master's degree from Stanford University in 1929, followed by a PhD from the University of Southern California.

== Career ==
Tiner began his career as a school teacher in Los Angeles, and he later became an assistant superintendent and supervisor.

In 1937, Tiner became the founding dean of George Pepperdine College, which he encouraged his friend George Pepperdine to found in South Los Angeles. As dean, he established the GraPhiC, Pepperdine's student newspaper, in 1937. He also organized the school's first athletic teams (first basketball, then baseball and tennis) and oversaw the selection of the school's colors—blue and orange. He then served as the college's second president from 1939 to 1957. When he was appointed, he was "the youngest college president" in the United States. He was succeeded by M. Norvel Young. He was appointed as a regent in 1977.

Tiner was a minister of the Churches of Christ for the Uptown Church of Christ in Long Beach.

== Death ==
Tiner died on January 7, 1981, in Long Beach, California.
