= Batsell Baxter =

1st President of Pepperdine University
- In office 1937–1939
- Preceded by: Office established
- Succeeded by: Hugh M. Tiner

10th and 12th President of Lipscomb University
- In office 1943–1946
- Preceded by: E. H. Ijams
- Succeeded by: Athens Clay Pullias
- In office 1932–1934
- Preceded by: H. Leo Boles
- Succeeded by: E. H. Ijams

Personal details
- Born: November 17, 1886 Sherman, Texas, U.S.
- Died: March 4, 1956 (aged 69) Nashville, Tennessee, U.S.
- Children: Batsell Barrett Baxter
- Education: Abilene Christian University (BA); University of Southern California (MA, PhD); Vanderbilt University (BD)

Batsell Baxter (November 17, 1886 – March 4, 1956) was one of the most important leaders and educators in the Churches of Christ in the first half of the 20th century.

== Biography ==
He received his early education from David Lipscomb and James A. Harding at the Nashville Bible School (now known as Lipscomb University). He also obtained degrees from Abilene Christian College (B.A.), University of Southern California (M.A., Ph.D.), and Vanderbilt University (B.D.).

Baxter served as president of Abilene Christian College (1924–1932), David Lipscomb College (1932–1934, 1943–1946), and George Pepperdine College (1937–1939). These institutions are now called Abilene Christian University, Lipscomb University, and Pepperdine University, respectively. He was also Dean of Cordell Christian College in Oklahoma and Dean of Thorp Spring Christian College (near Fort Worth, Texas). He wrote several books and regularly contributed to the Gospel Advocate, a periodical associated with the Churches of Christ. He also preached for several different Churches of Christ.

Baxter was the father of Batsell Barrett Baxter, who was also a professor and preacher in the Church of Christ. John Baxter, his grandson, and son of Batsell Barrett Baxter, is president of NationsUniversity.
