= Blanche Seaver =

American philanthropist and musician

Blanche Ebert Seaver (September 15, 1891–April 9, 1994) was an American philanthropist and musician.

== Early life and marriage ==
Born Blanche Ebert on September 15, 1891, she was the tenth child of Norwegian immigrants to Chicago. Her musical talent was evident from a young age, and she graduated from the Chicago Music School in 1911. She would go on to write and arrange music for Irish tenor John McCormack and for the Philadelphia Orchestra under the direction of Leopold Stokowski.

In 1916, she married Frank Seaver, a lawyer who had helped draft the first charter for Los Angeles County. He went on to make a fortune manufacturing oil drilling equipment first for Edward L. Doheny and later for his own Hydril Company.

== Philanthropy ==
The Seavers were generous philanthropists, founding an orphanage in Mexico City in the 1920s, and donating to the First Congregational Church of Los Angeles and the Los Angeles Music Center, in addition to other musical organizations. Blanche served on the board of several organizations, including Children's Hospital Los Angeles, Pomona College, and the University of Southern California.

Following Frank's death in 1964, Blanche became a benefactor of the young George Pepperdine College in South Central Los Angeles, which, due in large part to her donations, opened a campus in Malibu, California and was renamed Pepperdine University in 1971. In 1975, the liberal arts college at Pepperdine was named Seaver College in memory of Frank and in honor of Blanche's gifts. In all, her friendship with Pepperdine president William S. Banowsky led to more than $160 million in donations to Pepperdine, and she served on the university's board of regents until her death.
