= Howard A. White =

American historian

Howard Ashley White

President of Pepperdine University
- In office 1978–1985
- Preceded by: William S. Banowsky
- Succeeded by: David Davenport

Personal details
- Born: September 28, 1913 Cloverdale, Lauderdale County, Alabama, U.S.
- Died: February 1, 1991 (aged 77) Los Angeles, California, U.S.
- Spouse: Maxcine Feltman
- Children: 2
- Education: David Lipscomb College (AA); Tulane University (BA), (MA), (PhD)

Howard A. White (September 28, 1913 - February 1, 1991) was an American historian and academic administrator. He served as the president of Pepperdine University from 1978 to 1985.

== Early life ==
White was born on September 28, 1913, in Cloverdale, Alabama. He graduated from David Lipscomb College in 1932, and he earned a master's degree and PhD in history from Tulane University, finishing in 1953. From 1933 to 1942, White served as a preacher at a number of Church of Christ congregations in Mississippi.

== Career ==
White was a minister of the Churches of Christ in New Orleans, Louisiana while he was still in graduate school. He was described as an "evangelist" at the Carrollton Avenue Church of Christ in 1951.

White began his academic career as a professor of history at David Lipscomb College in 1953. In 1958, he joined the history faculty at George Pepperdine College as chair of the social sciences division. He published literature about the Reconstruction era. White served the university in a number of roles, including as executive vice president, and he founded the school's program in Heidelberg in 1963.

White served as the president of Pepperdine University from 1978 to 1985. During the course of his presidency, "Pepperdine's financial resources more than doubled during White's presidency, from $90 million to more than $208 million." His tenure also saw the addition of 200 acres to the school's Malibu campus, the construction of a considerable number of buildings on campus—including Eddy D. Field Stadium—and the 1984 Summer Olympics, which took place, in part, at Raleigh Runnels Memorial Pool. He was succeeded by David Davenport.

== Personal life and death ==
White married Maxcine Feltman in June 1952. She died in 1973. They had two sons. White died in 1991 in Los Angeles, at 77.

== Selected works ==
- White, Howard A. (1970). The Freedmen's Bureau in Louisiana. Baton Rouge, Louisiana: Louisiana State University Press. OCLC 754337933.
