= Batsell Barrett Baxter =

American minister

- Born: September 23, 1916; Cordell, Oklahoma, U.S.
- Died: March 31, 1982 (aged 65); Nashville, Tennessee, U.S.
- Father: Batsell Baxter

Batsell Barrett Baxter (September 23, 1916 – March 31, 1982) was an influential preacher and writer within the Churches of Christ.

== Biography ==
Baxter was the son of Batsell Baxter, another influential leader within the Churches of Christ. The younger Baxter preached his first sermon in Nashville, Tennessee, in 1933. He received his post-secondary education at Abilene Christian College (B.A.), University of Southern California (M.A., Ph.D.), and Vanderbilt University (B.D.). Baxter "was the first person in the Churches of Christ to receive a Ph.D. in speech communication," receiving that degree from the University of Southern California in 1944. He was appointed head of the Speech Department at David Lipscomb College in 1945. Later he headed the Bible department at David Lipscomb College after his father died.

Baxter preached in Nashville at the Trinity Lane Church of Christ from 1946 to 1951, and preached at the Hillsboro Church of Christ in Nashville for 29 years from 1951 to 1980 when he retired. During much of this time, his sermons were recorded for broadcast on WLAC radio on Sunday nights. He was considered by many to be "the best preacher of the Churches of Christ during his lifetime." He advocated a method of preaching that focused on meeting the particular needs of his listeners and tailored the content and techniques used to the "life-situation" of the particular audience. Baxter's style was very different from the harder style that originated in the debating tradition of the Churches of Christ, emphasizing a "softer" gospel of love. He trained hundreds of younger preachers and his influence was such "that at one time many could readily tell if a preacher had trained at Lipscomb college."

Baxter was also a writer for the Gospel Advocate and 20th Century Christian. He wrote eleven books including Speaking for the Master, I Believe Because, and When Life Tumbles In. He coauthored two books, and coedited seven more. He became the regular speaker for the Herald of Truth television program in August 1959. When the program went to a radio series, he was featured periodically.

In his youth, Baxter was an avid tennis player, winning the city championship in the boys' (14 and under) classification in Nashville, Tennessee.
