= George L. Graziadio Jr. =

American real estate developer (1919–2002)

- Born: George Louis Graziadio Jr. 1919; Vernon, Connecticut, U.S.
- Died: June 2002 (aged 82–83); Rolling Hills, California, U.S.
- Occupations: Commercial real estate developer, banker
- Spouse: Reva Mikles
- Children: 1 son, 2 daughters

George L. Graziadio Jr. (1919–2002) was an American commercial real estate developer, banker and philanthropist. With George Eltinge, he developed 100 shopping centers for Kmart in California and elsewhere in the 1950s. In 1963, they co-founded Imperial Bancorp, which was later acquired by Comerica and renamed Comerica Bank-California. The Graziadio School of Business and Management at Pepperdine University bears his name.

== Early life ==
George L. Graziadio Jr. was born in 1919 in Vernon, Connecticut. His father was a realtor, insurance businessman and auctioneer. His paternal grandparents were Italian while his maternal grandparents were Irish.

Graziadio graduated from high school in 1937. He dropped out of college in 1939. He took a road trip from Connecticut to Los Angeles, California with a friend in 1939, and decided to stay there.

== Business career ==
Graziadio started a commercial real estate development company with George Eltinge in the 1950s. The two men built a hundred shopping centers in California and elsewhere, most of which housed Kmart stores.

Graziadio and Eltinge co-founded the Imperial Bank-California in 1963. The two men cobbled US$1.25 million together from their social circles to start the bank after they failed to have access to loans from banks for their real estate development projects. It was later known as Imperial Bancorp. It had "$7.4 billion in assets and 15 branches," and mostly made loans to technology and entertainment companies in the Southland. For example, they made loans to Yahoo! and feature films. Graziadio served as its Chairman until it was acquired by Comerica, a bank based in Detroit, Michigan, for US$1.3 billion.

== Philanthropy ==
Graziadio donated US$15 million to Pepperdine University in 1996. As a result, the Pepperdine Graziadio Business School bears his name. Additionally, he donated US$650,000 to endow the George L. Graziadio Center for Italian Studies at California State University, Long Beach.

With his wife, Graziadio endowed the George and Reva Graziadio Radiology Center at the Torrance Memorial Medical Center in Torrance, California. They also donated to the "Mountain Communities Hospital in Lake Arrowhead, the John Douglas French Alzheimer's Foundation, Chapman University, UCLA, the Hugh O'Brian Youth Foundation and the YMCA." Additionally, they were the 2002 recipients of the Humanitarians of the Year Award from the House Ear Institute.

Graziadio was the 2002 recipient of the Horatio Alger Award from the Horatio Alger Association of Distinguished Americans.

== Personal life ==
Graziadio married Reva Mikles, a native of Magazine, Arkansas. They resided in Rolling Hills, a gated community on the Palos Verdes Peninsula near Los Angeles, California. They had a son, G. Louis Graziadio III, and two daughters, Mary Lou Graziadio and Alida Calvillo.

== Death ==
Graziadio died of cancer on the Palos Verdes Peninsula in June 2002. His funeral was held at the Firestone Fieldhouse on the campus of Pepperdine University.
