= Jim Gash =

American legal scholar and academic administrator

8th President of Pepperdine University
- Incumbent
- Assumed office August 1, 2019
- Preceded by: Andrew K. Benton

Personal details
- Born: James Allan Gash; March 15, 1967 (age 59)
- Education: Abilene Christian University (BA); Pepperdine University (JD)

James Allan Gash (born March 15, 1967) is an American legal scholar and academic administrator who is the president of Pepperdine University.

== Education ==
Gash received his Bachelor of Arts in finance with highest honors from Abilene Christian University (ACU) in 1989. While at ACU, Gash was the place kicker for the Abilene Christian Wildcats football team. In 2019, Gash was awarded the Jim Womack Award for professional achievement by a former ACU student-athlete.

In 1993, Gash graduated with highest honors with a Juris Doctor from the Pepperdine University School of Law in 1993. While in law school, he served as the editor-in-chief of the Pepperdine Law Review and finished at the top of his graduating class.

== Career ==
=== Early career ===
After graduating from law school, Gash served as a law clerk to the Honorable Edith H. Jones, United States Court of Appeals for the Fifth Circuit. Gash was later a trial attorney at the firm Kirkland & Ellis from 1995 until 1999.

=== Pepperdine ===
In 1999, Gash began teaching at the Pepperdine University School of Law. In 2005, he became the school's associate dean for student life, and in 2017 he became the assistant dean of strategic planning and external relations. Before being named president of Pepperdine, Gash served as the director of the Sudreau Global Justice Program at the Pepperdine University School of Law. On 14 February 2019, it was announced that he would become the eighth president of Pepperdine University, succeeding Andrew K. Benton. He was inaugurated on 25 September 2019.

=== Legal aid in Africa ===
In 2009, Gash began providing legal aid in Africa and especially in Uganda. Over the next decade, he worked to reduce the backlog of juvenile cases, helped institute plea bargaining in the nation's justice system, and became the first American to argue a case before the Ugandan Court of Appeals. In 2012, he was named special advisor to the High Court of Uganda, and in 2018 LivingStone International University in Mbale named him Chancellor, a largely ceremonial position. In 2013, Gash won the Warren M. Christopher International Lawyer of the Year award, given by the California Lawyers Association.

== Publications and film ==
Gash is the author of several academic law review articles, with a focus on punitive damages. In 2016, Gash told the story of his work in Africa in the book Divine Collision: An African Boy, an American Lawyer, and Their Remarkable Battle for Freedom. He is also the subject of a documentary called Remand, which covers his work in Uganda.
