= David Davenport =

American academic administrator

President of Pepperdine University
- In office 1985–2000
- Preceded by: Howard A. White
- Succeeded by: Andrew K. Benton

Personal details
- Born: c. 1950 (age 75–76) Kansas, U.S.
- Education: Stanford University; University of Kansas School of Law

David Davenport (born c. 1950) is an American academic administrator. He served as the president of Pepperdine University from 1985 to 2000.

== Early life ==
Davenport was born around 1950 in Kansas. A graduate of Stanford University, he earned a J.D. degree from the University of Kansas School of Law.

== Career ==
Davenport began his career as a lawyer in San Diego, California. He later became a minister of the Churches of Christ.

Davenport joined the faculty of the Pepperdine University School of Law in 1980. He served as the president of Pepperdine University from 1985 to 2000. According to The Los Angeles Times, "Pepperdine's enrollment grew by about 15% to more than 7,800, while its endowment more than quintupled, from about $56 million in 1985 to more than $310 million" during the course of his presidency. He was succeeded by Andrew K. Benton.

Davenport is a research fellow at the Hoover Institution, a think tank at Stanford University.

== Personal life ==
With his wife Sally, Davenport has three children.
