= Pepperdine Law Review =

- Discipline: Law review
- Language: English
- Edited by: Annie McCarthy

Publication details
- History: 1973-present
- Publisher: Pepperdine University School of Law (United States)
- Frequency: 5/year

Standard abbreviations
- Bluebook: Pepp. L. Rev.
- ISO 4: Pepperdine Law Rev.

Indexing
- ISSN: 0092-430X
- LCCN: 73647780
- OCLC no.: 01789808

Links
- Journal homepage; Online access

The Pepperdine Law Review is a student-edited law journal published by an independent student group composed of second- and third-year J.D. students at Pepperdine University School of Law. The Law Review publishes four to five issues a year and sponsors an annual symposium on a relevant legal topic. Since its founding in 1972, the Pepperdine Law Review has been a resource for practitioners, law professors, and judges alike. The Law Review has been cited several times by the United States Supreme Court, and is available on Westlaw and LexisNexis.

== Membership ==
Members of the Law Review are selected on the basis of academic excellence and participation in a rigorous selection process. Students in the top 10% of their first-year class may elect to join the journal's staff ("grading on"), and other students in the top 50% may seek membership by participating in an anonymously graded writing competition ("writing on").

=== Notable alumni ===
Pepperdine Law Review Alumni have moved on to successful careers both in public service and private practice. The Pepperdine Law Review also has a strong tradition of sending its members to judicial clerkships across the country. Pepperdine Law Review alumni have clerked at all levels of the federal judiciary and several state courts.

- Jeffrey S. Boyd, Volume 18 editor-in-chief: Justice of the Texas Supreme Court
- Beverly Reid O'Connell, Volume 17 managing editor: Judge of the United States District Court for the Central District of California
- Charles R. Eskridge, Judge of the United States District Court for the Southern District of Texas
- James A. Gash, Volume 20 editor-in-chief: President of Pepperdine University
