= Frank Seaver =

American oil executive and philanthropist

- Seaver and his wife, Blanche, in the 1950s
- Born: Frank Roger Seaver; April 12, 1883; San Jose, California, U.S.
- Died: October 30, 1964 (aged 81); Los Angeles, California, U.S.
- Education: Pomona College
- Occupations: Businessman; Oil executive Philanthropist
- Years active: 1919–1964

Frank Roger Seaver (April 12, 1883 – October 30, 1964) was an American lawyer, Naval officer, oil executive, and philanthropist.

== Early life ==
Frank Seaver was born April 12, 1883, in San Jose, California. He grew up in Claremont, California, graduating from Pomona College in 1905, where he managed the football team and served as the first president of the Associated Students of Pomona College. He later attended Harvard Law School and practiced law in Los Angeles, and helped draft the first charter of Los Angeles County. He served in the Navy during World War I and helped establish the California Naval Militia.

== Career ==
Seaver met Edward L. Doheny on a weekend yachting trip in 1919, who hired him to work for his oil enterprise. He became General Counsel and Managing General Agent for Doheny's operations in Mexico from 1921 to 1927, and convinced the Mexican government to hire him for an ambitious road paving project. He bought the Doheny-Stone Drill Company from Doheny in 1928.

In 1933, Seaver later renamed the drill company, the Hydril Company, a producer of oil drilling equipment. The company's hydraulic blowout preventer was so durable that the elder Seaver later elected to lease it to customers, rather than sell it to them outright.

Seaver ran the company until his death on October 30, 1964, in The Hydril Company was later headed by his nephew, Richard C. Seaver.

== Philanthropy ==
Seaver and his wife, Blanche, were a major contributor to Pomona College, where they served as trustees, and where the Seaver Science Center is named after him and several other buildings are named after his family. They were also the principal benefactors of the Malibu campus of Pepperdine University, which named its College of Letters, Arts, and Sciences after him, and donated portions of their $10.1 million estate (equivalent to $105 million in 2025) to other institutions.
