= Associated Students of Pomona College =

Student government of Pomona College

- ASPC's logo
- Abbreviation: ASPC
- Formation: 1904; 122 years ago
- Type: Student government
- Legal status: 501(c)(3) non-profit
- Location: Smith Campus Center, 170 E. 6th St., Claremont, California, United States
- Coordinates: 34.0992518°N 117.7139566°W
- Members: 1,690 students (2026)
- President: Malu Estoducto
- Main organ: Senate
- Affiliations: Pomona College
- Budget: $300,915 (2020)
- Revenue: $537,061 (2020)
- Website: pomonastudents.org

The Associated Students of Pomona College, commonly abbreviated as ASPC, is the student government of Pomona College, a liberal arts college in Claremont, California, United States. It was founded in 1904, and is composed of elected representatives. Its primary functions are distributing extracurricular funds, conducting advocacy, running student programming, and providing various student services.

== History ==
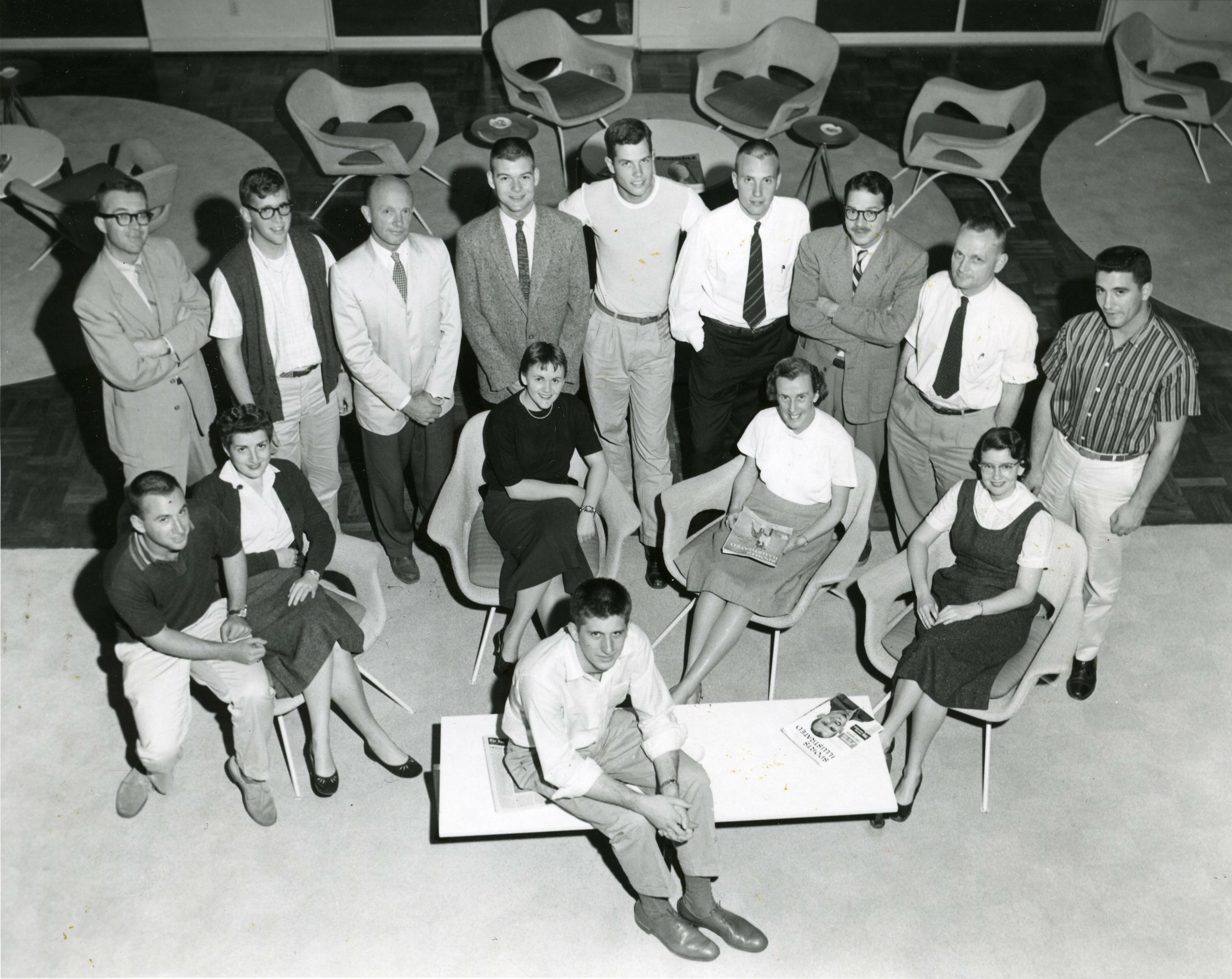
1956–1957 College Life Council members

ASPC was founded in 1904, six years after instruction began at Pomona.

Its first female president took office during World War II.

A wave election took place in 2014, in which a series of candidates ran successfully on a platform, dubbed #slate, centered around diversity, representation, and inclusivity issues.

In the 2020s, ASPC or its senators have received media attention on several occasions for anti-Zionist actions.

== Structure ==
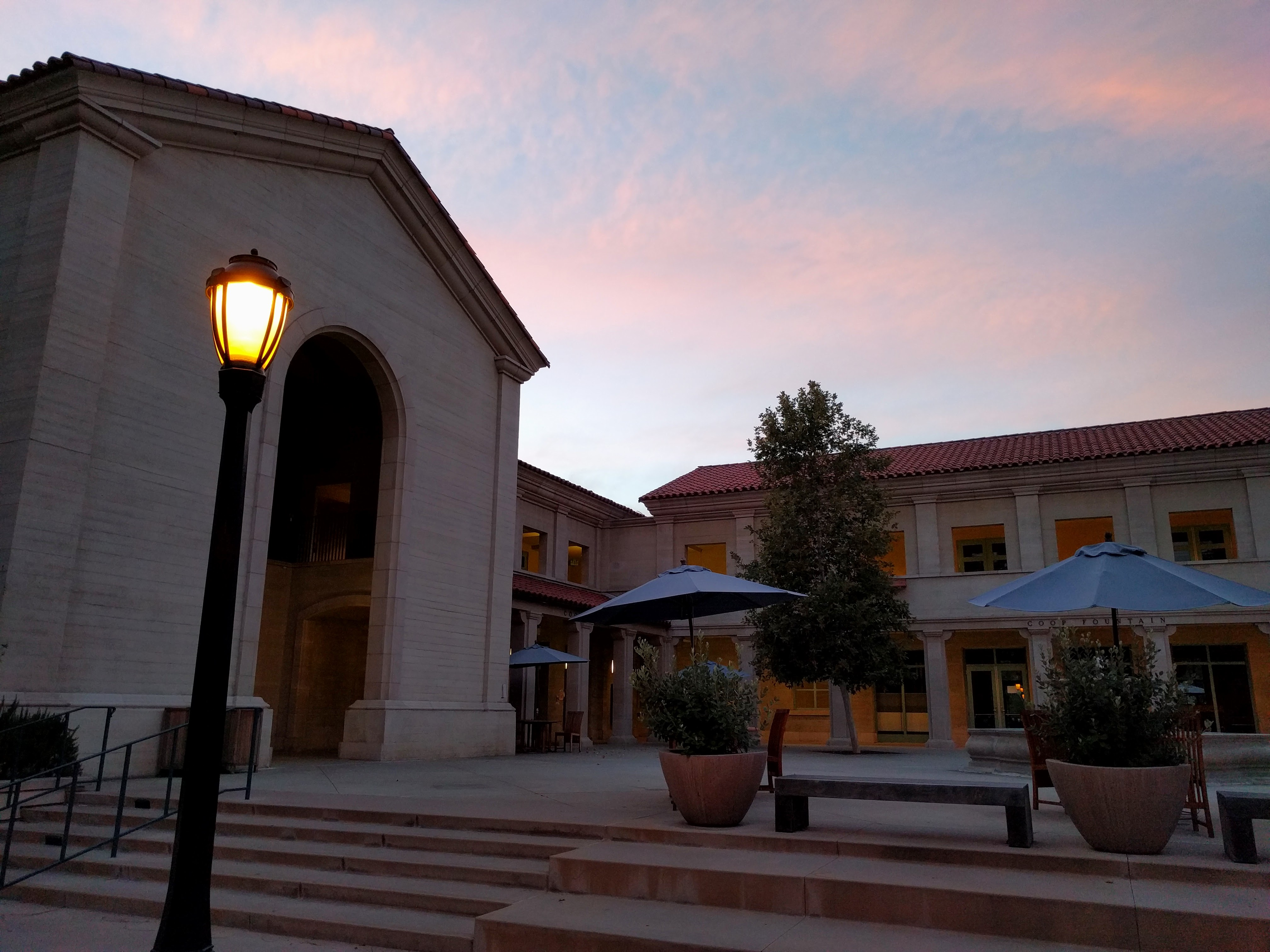
The Smith Campus Center, home to ASPC's offices (view as a 360° interactive panorama)

The governing body of ASPC is the ASPC Senate, which consists of roughly two dozen elected representatives, including the four class presidents and commissioners for areas such sports and environmental affairs.

Senators are paid a stipend. Legally, ASPC is registered as a 501(c)(3) non-profit organization. Its revenue comes primarily from mandatory student fees.

ASPC runs a number of committees, including the Pomona Events Committee (PEC), Pomona's student programming board.

== Activities ==
ASPC has four main functions.

First, it distributes funding to student organizations at Pomona and the undergraduate Claremont Colleges (5Cs) totaling more than $500,000 annually. As of 2019–20, its contributions make up 47% of funding for 5C student organizations.

Second, it advocates to the Pomona College administration on behalf of the student body. It has been characterized as an active participant in the college's shared governance.

Third, it provides various services to students, including an airport rideshare, a poster lab, and a New York Times distribution program. ASPC also runs the Coop Store (which sells food, apparel, and other sundries) and the Coop Fountain (a cafe).

Last, it conducts programming (largely through PEC), including covering the cost of security and alcohol for some social events.

== Presidents ==
Name	Term	Grad. year	Ref.
Frank R. Seaver	1904–05	1905	
Donald Fox	1913–14?	?	
Jack Pettee	1931–32?	?	
Margaret Boothby	1943–44	1945	
Sumner Offill	1964–65	1965	
Eric Sundquist	Spring 1970?	?	
David Doubleday; Roger Riffenburgh	Fall 1970	?	
Paul Fairchild	1991–92	1993	
Galen Benshoof	2005-06	2006	
Sarah Kuriakose	2006-07	2007	
Eliza Finley	2008-09	2009	
Jed Cullen	2009-2010	2010	
Stephanie Almeida	2010 - 11	2011	
Nate Brown	2011–12	2012	
Sarah Appelbaum	2012–13	2013	
Darrell Jones III	2013–14	2014	
Rachel Jackson	2014–15	2015	
Nico Kass	2015–16	2016	
Christina Tong	2016–17	2017	
Maria Jose Vides	2017–18	2018	
Alejandro Guerrero	2018–19	2019	
Miguel Delgado-Garcia	2019–20	2020	
Payal Kachru	2020–21	2021	
Nirali Devgan	2021–22	2022	
Vera Berger	2022–23	2023	
Timi Adelakun	2023–24	2024	
Devlin Orlin	2024–25	2025	
Grace Zheng	2025–26	2026	
Malu Estoducto	2026-2027	2027	
