= M. Norvel Young =

American historian

President of Pepperdine University
- In office 1957–1971
- Preceded by: Hugh M. Tiner
- Succeeded by: William S. Banowsky

Personal details
- Born: October 5, 1915 Nashville, Tennessee, U.S.
- Died: February 17, 1998 (aged 82) Malibu, California, U.S.
- Spouse: Helen Mattox
- Children: 1 son, 3 daughters
- Education: David Lipscomb College, Abilene Christian College (BA); Vanderbilt University (PhD)

Matt Norvel Young (October 5, 1915 – February 17, 1998), known as M. Norvel Young, was an American academic administrator. He served as the president of Pepperdine University from 1957 to 1971 and as its chancellor from 1971 to 1985. He was the author of five books.

== Early life ==
M. Norvel Young was born in 1915 in Nashville, Tennessee. He attended Lipscomb University and Abilene Christian University, graduating in 1936. He subsequently earned a PhD in history from Vanderbilt University.

== Career ==
Professor Young taught history at George Pepperdine College from 1938 to 1941. He later taught at Lipscomb University, and he became the minister of Broadway Church of Christ in Lubbock, Texas. He co-founded Lubbock Christian College in 1957.

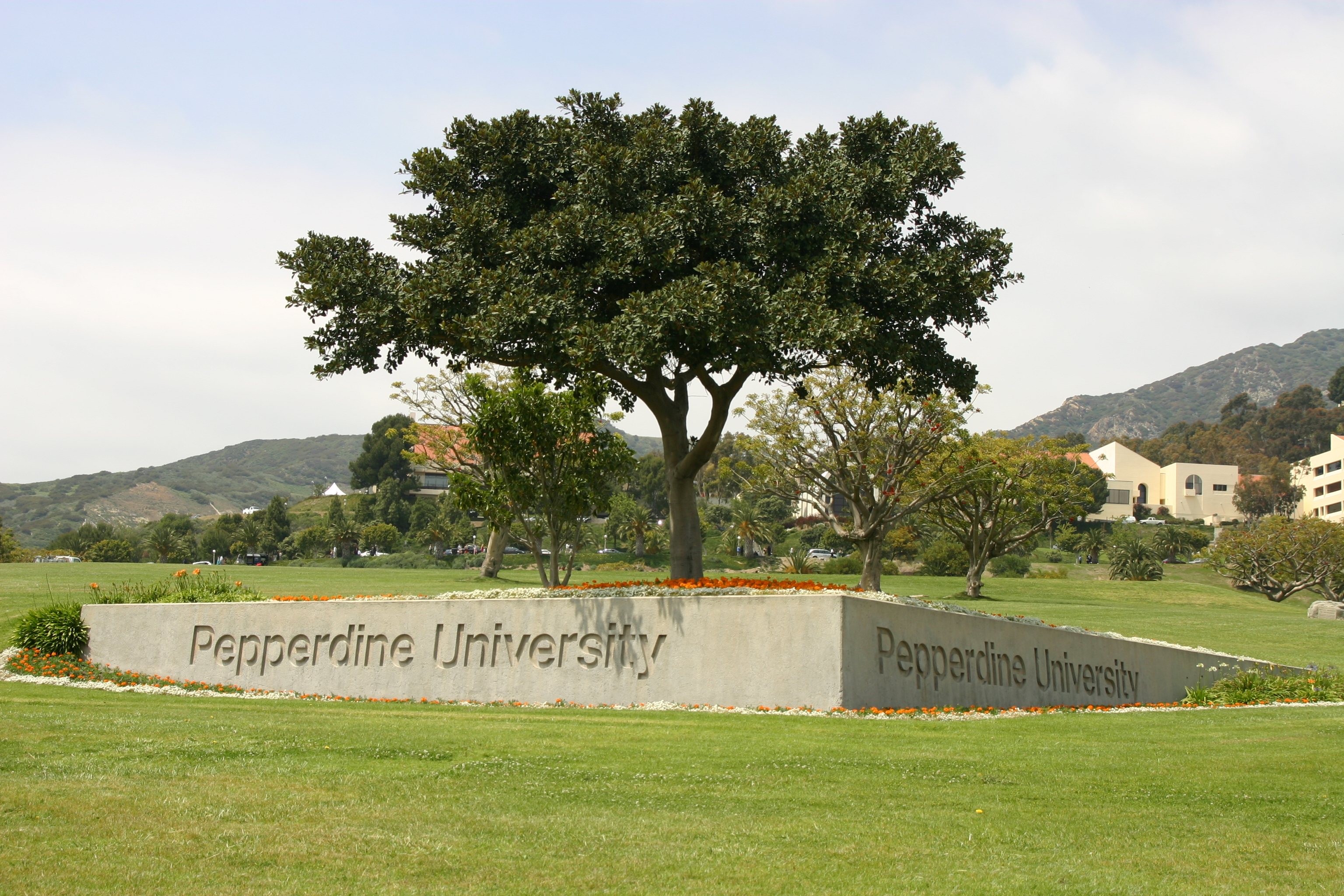
Pepperdine University entrance gate.

Young served as the president of Pepperdine University from 1957 to 1971, and as its chancellor from 1971 to 1985. According to The New York Times, "Under his leadership, Pepperdine grew from a small college with 950 students in Los Angeles to a full-fledged university with an enrolment of 9,500." Young was also a prolific fundraiser.

Facing crisis during the Watts Riots, Pepperdine President Young negotiated all night with activists to prevent the razing of the school. Pepperdine's Los Angeles campus was saved. Soon thereafter, the school opened a campus in Malibu, California.

Young was the author of five books.

== Personal life and death ==
Young married Helen Mattox on August 31, 1939, in Oklahoma City, Oklahoma. They had a son and three daughters. They resided on the campus of Pepperdine University in Malibu. Young was an elder at the Malibu Church of Christ. On September 16, 1975, Chancellor Young was responsible for the deaths of two women in a drunk driving incident. He pleaded guilty to involuntary manslaughter and was sentenced to a fine and four years of probation on the condition that he cease serving the university in an official capacity and perform a research project on the connection between stress and alcohol abuse. He served his sentence, and his research resulted in a book, Poison Stress Is a Killer. He also gave over 100 public addresses and workshops and contributed to a drunk-driving program that was used to rehabilitate offenders in Los Angeles.

Young died of a heart attack in 1998 in Malibu, at the age of 82. His widow died on November 30, 2017.

== Selected works ==
- Young, M. Norvel; Hollingsworth, Mary (1997). Living lights, shining stars : ten secrets to becoming the light of the world. West Monroe, Louisiana: Howard Publishing. ISBN 9781878990761. OCLC 37011434.
- Young, M. Norvel (1982). Pepperdine University : a place, a people, a purpose. New York: Newcomen Society. OCLC 9895776.
- Young, M. Norvel (1963). Sermons. Abilene, Texas: Biblical Research Press. OCLC 3654452.
- Young, M. Norvel; Dreher, John James (1978). Poison stress is a killer : a monograph on physical and behavioral stress and some of its effects on modern man. Malibu, California: Pepperdine University Press. OCLC 4703371.
- Young, M. Norvel (1949). A history of colleges established by members of the Churches of Christ. Kansas City, Missouri: Old Paths Book Club. OCLC 3664987.
