= Andrew K. Benton =

American lawyer and academic administrator

7th President of Pepperdine University
- In office July 1, 2000 – July 31, 2019
- Preceded by: David Davenport
- Succeeded by: Jim Gash

Personal details
- Born: c. 1952 (age 73–74) Kansas, U.S.
- Spouse: Deborah
- Education: Oklahoma Christian University (BA); Oklahoma City University (JD)

Andrew K. Benton (born c. 1952) is an American lawyer and academic administrator who served as the seventh president of Pepperdine University and as an interim president at the University of Central Oklahoma.

== Early life ==
Benton was born in Lawrence, Kansas. He graduated from Oklahoma Christian University, where he earned a bachelor's degree in American studies in 1974, and he earned a J.D. from Oklahoma City University.

== Career ==
Benton began his career as a lawyer in Oklahoma. He was an assistant to the president of his alma mater, Oklahoma Christian University, from 1975 to 1984.

Benton joined Pepperdine University in 1984. He served as its vice president from 1991 to 1999. He served as its president from 2000 to 2019, becoming the longest-serving person to hold the office. During the course of his presidency, "Total University assets have increased by more than $1 billion." His presidency also saw the construction of the Drescher graduate campus and the establishment of campuses in Lausanne and Shanghai. When Jim Gash succeeded him in 2019, Benton took on the role of president emeritus. A road on the university's Malibu campus was renamed Benton Way in honor of his service to the university.

While serving at Pepperdine, Benton was also named the vice chair, and later the chair, of the board of directors of the National Association of Independent Colleges and Universities (NAICU).

Benton was honored as a distinguished alumnus by Oklahoma Christian University in 2000. In 2023, Benton became the interim president of the University of Central Oklahoma after Patti Neuhold-Ravikumar resigned.

== Personal life ==
With his wife Deborah, Benton has a son and a daughter. He is a member of the Churches of Christ.
