= William S. Banowsky =

American academic administrator (1936–2019)

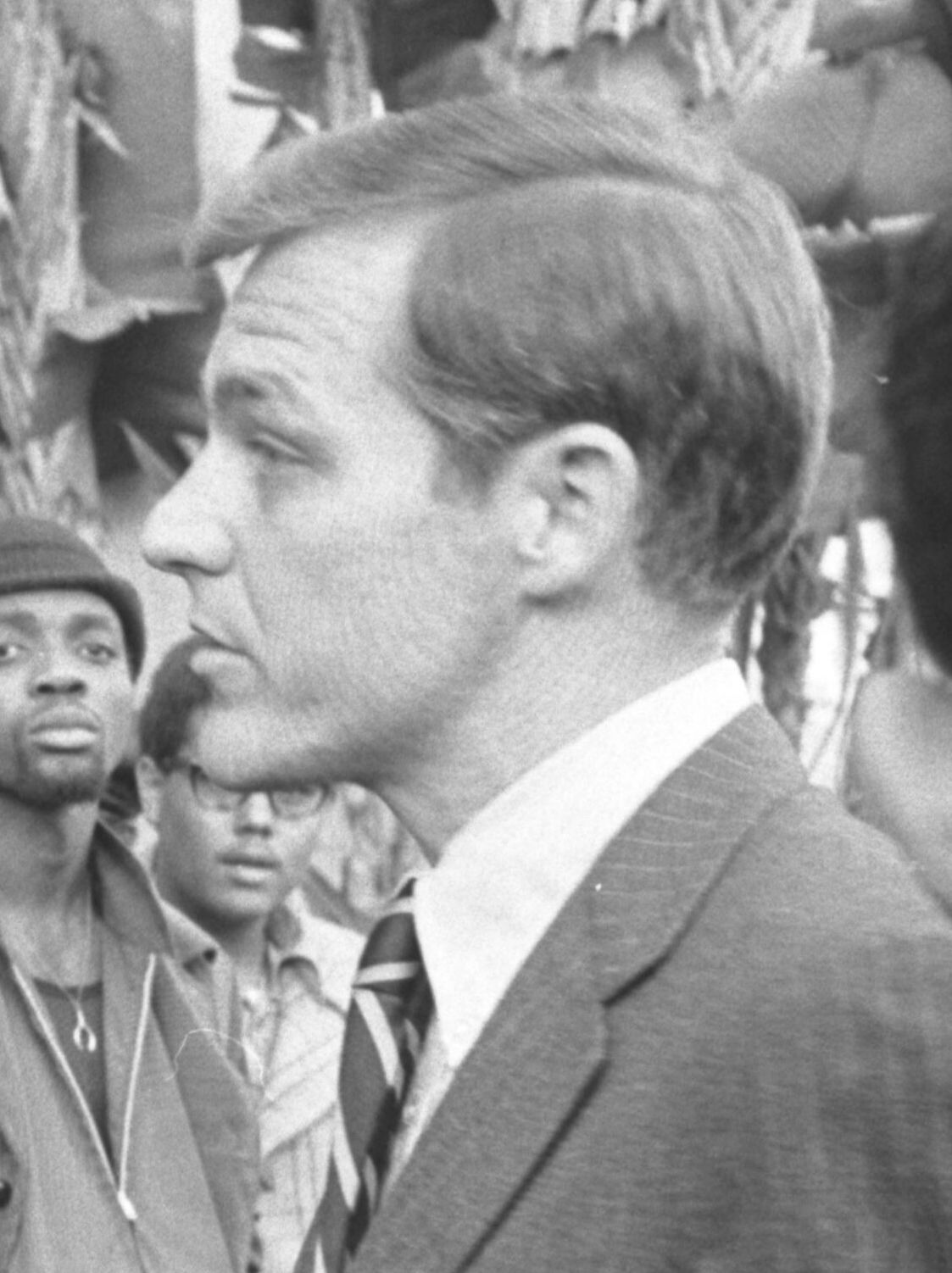
- Banowsky in 1970

President of Pepperdine University
- In office 1971–1978
- Preceded by: M. Norvel Young
- Succeeded by: Howard A. White

President of the University of Oklahoma
- In office 1978–1984
- Preceded by: Paul F. Sharp
- Succeeded by: Frank E. Horton

Personal details
- Born: March 4, 1936 Abilene, Texas, U.S.
- Died: April 28, 2019 (aged 83)
- Spouse: Gay Barnes Banowsky
- Children: 4
- Education: David Lipscomb College (BA); University of New Mexico (MA); University of Southern California (PhD)

William Slater Banowsky (March 4, 1936 – April 28, 2019) was an American academic administrator. He served as president of Pepperdine University from 1971 to 1978, then as president of the University of Oklahoma from 1978 to 1982 when he resigned to become President of the Los Angeles Area Chamber of Commerce. In 1983, Banowsky returned as OU president and served for two more years. Banowsky was also a member of the Republican National Committee for the state of California from 1973 to 1975.

== Life ==
=== Early life and education ===
Banowsky was born in 1936 to a religious family. He was raised in Fort Worth, Texas, where as a teenager he preached at Church of Christ congregations. He attended David Lipscomb College in Nashville, Tennessee, where he studied history and speech on a baseball scholarship. He received his master's degree in speech from the University of New Mexico. In 1959, Banowsky became an assistant to Norvel Young, the president of George Pepperdine College. The same year, he enrolled in a PhD program in communication at USC. Within two years, he had advanced to the role of dean of students at Pepperdine, and in 1963 he completed his PhD.

=== Career ===
In 1963, Banowsky became the minister of the Broadway Church of Christ in Lubbock, Texas, a congregation of about 2,000 people. In 1968, Banowsky returned to Pepperdine as executive vice president of the school's South Los Angeles campus. He helped the school raise $36 million to fund its expansion to Malibu. In 1971, he was named the fourth president of the recently re-christened Pepperdine University. His presidency saw the expansion of the university from 1,000 to 8,000 students and from 33 acres to 650. He also expanded the university's assets from $8 million to more than $100 million.

During his tenure at Pepperdine, Banowsky was involved in Republican party politics. He was the chairman of the Los Angeles County Committee to Reelect the President and also the California Republican National Committeeman. He considered running for the U.S. Senate in 1976, but he decided against it. In 1975, Banowsky expected to be nominated by President Ford to the position of undersecretary of the Department of the Interior, but the nomination fell through. He also served as a fundraiser for Ronald Reagan in the 1970s.

In 1978, Banowsky was named the tenth president of the University of Oklahoma. During his tenure at Oklahoma, the university's endowment more than doubled, as did the size of the Bizzell Memorial Library. In 1982, he resigned to become the first full-time president of the Los Angeles Area Chamber of Commerce. Just six weeks after taking the position, however, Banowsky regarded the decision as a "major mistake in judgment" and returned to his position at Oklahoma. Banowsky left the university again in 1984 to head Gaylord Broadcasting, and in 1988 he was named executive vice president of National Medical Enterprises.

=== Death and legacy ===
Banowsky died April 28, 2019, at the age of 83. He was the author of several books, including The Malibu Miracle, a memoir about his time at Pepperdine, and The Mirror of a Movement, a history of the Churches of Christ. Banowsky Boulevard, a street on the Malibu campus of Pepperdine University, was named in honor of his service to the university.
