= Pepperdine University =

Christian university in Los Angeles County, California, US

- Former name: George Pepperdine College (1937–1971)
- Motto: Freely ye received, freely give
- Type: Private research university
- Established: 1937; 89 years ago
- Affiliations: NAICU
- Religious affiliation: Church of Christ
- Endowment: $1.3 billion (2024)
- President: Jim Gash
- Faculty: 421 full-time (2022), 561 part-time (2022)
- Students: 10,030 (fall 2022)
- Undergraduates: 3,662 (fall 2022)
- Postgraduates: 6,368 (fall 2022)
- Location: Los Angeles County, California, United States (Malibu post office address); 34°02′19.26″N 118°42′27.29″W
- Campus: Suburban 830 acres (340 ha)
- Newspaper: Pepperdine Graphic
- Colors: Blue and orange
- Nickname: Waves
- Sporting affiliations: NCAA Division I – WCC
- Mascot: Willie the Wave
- Website: pepperdine.edu

Pepperdine University (/ˈpɛpərdaɪn/) is a private research university affiliated with the Churches of Christ and with its main campus in Los Angeles County, California, United States. Pepperdine's main campus consists of 830 acres (340 ha) overlooking the Pacific Ocean and the Pacific Coast Highway near Malibu, California. Founded by entrepreneur George Pepperdine in South Los Angeles in 1937, the school expanded to Malibu in 1972. Courses are taught at the main Malibu campus, as well as the graduate campuses in the United States, Latin America, and Europe.

The university is composed of an undergraduate liberal arts school (Seaver College) and four graduate schools: the Caruso School of Law, the Graziadio Business School, the Graduate School of Education and Psychology, and the School of Public Policy. It is classified with a "Research 2 (R2): High Research Activity" designation.

== History ==
=== Early years ===
In February 1937, against the backdrop of the Great Depression, George Pepperdine founded a liberal arts college in the city of Los Angeles to be affiliated with the Churches of Christ.

Pepperdine had built his fortune largely through the Western Auto Supply Company, which he founded in 1909 with a $5 investment. Pepperdine had a twofold objective for the college: "First, we want to provide first-class, fully accredited academic training in the liberal arts ... Secondly, we are especially dedicated to a greater goal—that of building in the student a Christ-like life, a love for the church, and a passion for the souls of mankind."

On September 21, 1937, 167 new students from 22 different states and two other countries entered classes on a newly built campus on 34 acres (14 ha) at West 79th Street and South Vermont Avenue in the Vermont Knolls neighborhood of South Los Angeles, later referred to as the Vermont Avenue campus. The campus was designed in the Streamline Moderne style by John M. Cooper, an art deco architect. By April 5, 1938, George Pepperdine College was fully accredited by the Northwest Association in large part due to the leadership of president Batsell Baxter and dean Hugh M. Tiner.

The student newspaper, the Graphic, published its first issue in October 1937.

The college expanded significantly in the years following its founding, reaching an enrollment of 1,839 for the 1948–1949 year. The college's first graduate program, a master of arts in religion, admitted its first students in 1944, and the school's first international program, a year-long program in Heidelberg, Germany, was launched in 1963.

=== Racial unrest, murder, and move to Malibu ===
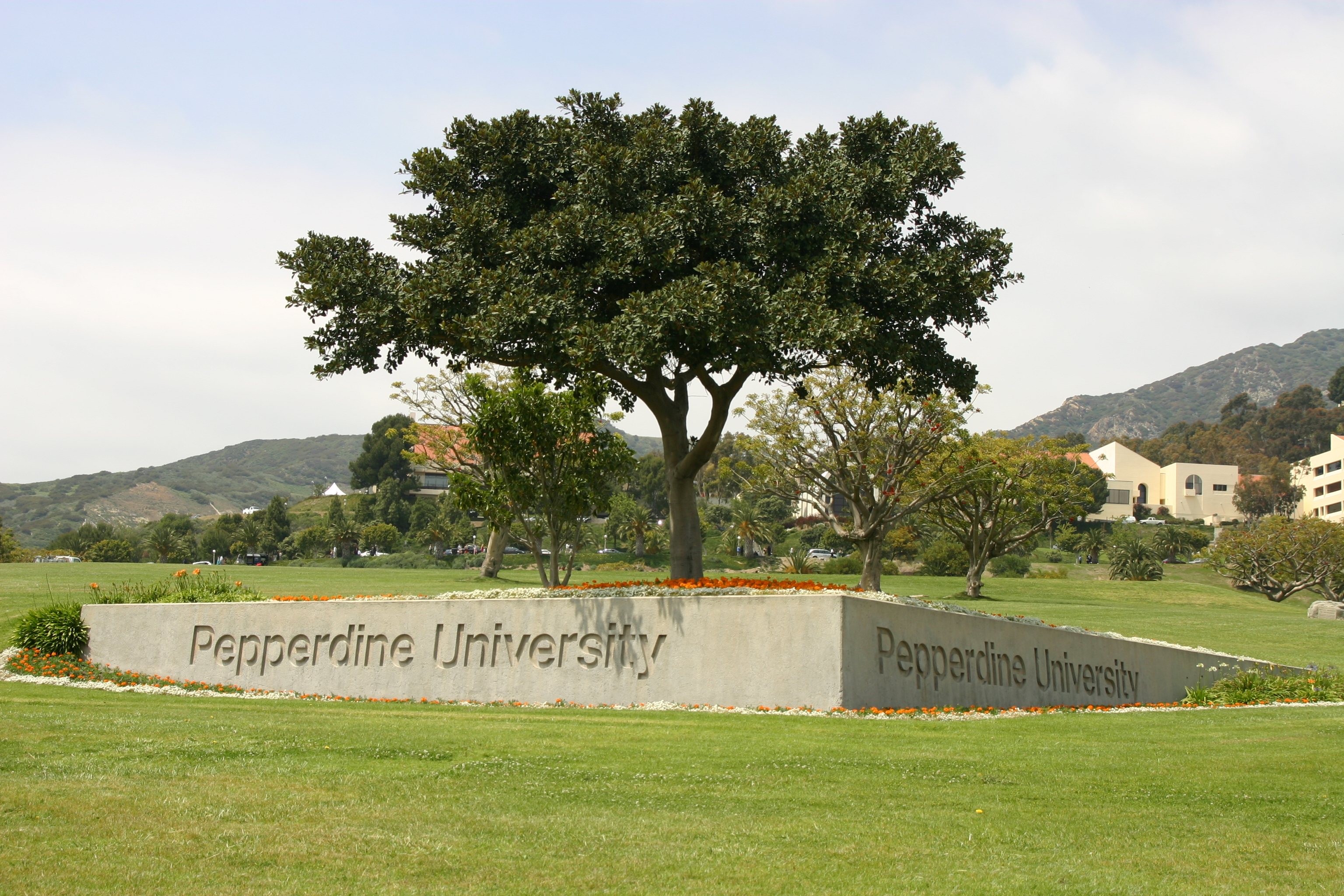
The southeast corner of Pepperdine's Malibu campus (2007)

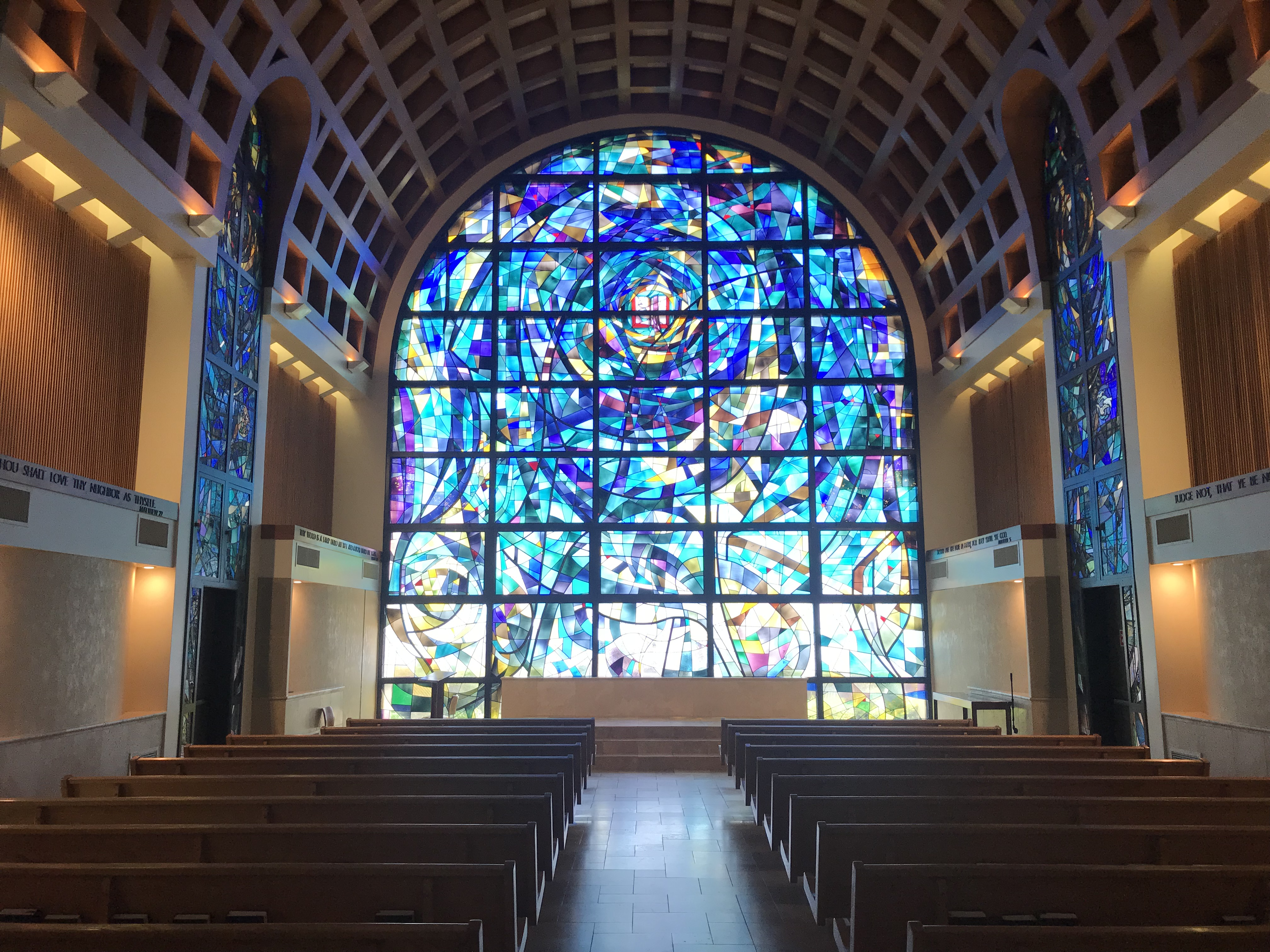
The interior of Stauffer Chapel on Pepperdine's Malibu campus, built in 1973 (2019)

By 1957, when M. Norvel Young was named president, the young college faced serious problems, not least of which was the high cost of expansion in South Los Angeles. The area around the Vermont Avenue campus was developing issues including rising crime and urban decay, and racial tensions had arisen that led to the 1965 Watts Riots.

Before the worst of the tensions began, President Young had begun to look for suburban sites to expand the university's footprint. In 1966, a committee was formed to look at potential locations, including sites in Westlake Village and Calabasas. Pepperdine favored the Westlake Village location until the Adamson-Rindge family, who owned hundreds of acres near Malibu, offered to donate 138 acres (56 ha) and to sell 58.7 adjacent acres. Despite concerns over building costs on the mountainous site, the school decided to move forward based on its prime location and potential for raising donations, accepting the land in Malibu in 1968.

In March 1969, Larry Kimmons, a Black teenager from the South LA neighborhood, was killed by Pepperdine campus security officer Charlie Lane following a verbal argument. Protests ensued, with Black students opposing the college's administration. Some have attributed the killing to racism.

In December 1970, student activists threatened to burn down the campus, even setting small fires in three buildings. Students later occupied the academic life building, leading to a standoff with the Los Angeles Police Department that was defused by negotiations with Vice President William S. Banowsky.

Construction in Malibu began on April 13, 1971, and the new campus opened in September 1972. The campus and many of its buildings were planned by Los Angeles–based architect William Pereira, who had also designed the Los Angeles County Museum of Art, the University of California, Irvine, and much of the University of Southern California. The construction of the Malibu campus was made possible largely by gifts from Blanche Seaver, the wife of Frank R. Seaver and heir of his oil-drill manufacturing fortune, who donated to Pepperdine more than $160 million over her lifetime. The undergraduate college was officially named after Seaver in 1975.

The university retained and continued to expand its original Vermont Avenue Campus, building a new academic building there in 1970, and redesigning the curriculum to serve its more urban setting. Much of the undergraduate liberal arts program, however, moved to the new Malibu campus. In the decade to come, the Vermont Avenue Campus transitioned away from its residential model, and in 1981 it was sold to Crenshaw Christian Center, whose minister, Frederick K. C. Price, then oversaw construction of the "Faith Dome", then the largest-domed church in the United States.

=== Growth of the university ===
Presidents of Pepperdine
President	Years served
Batsell Baxter	1937–1939
Hugh M. Tiner	1939–1957
M. Norvel Young	1957–1971
William S. Banowsky	1971–1978
Howard A. White	1978–1985
David Davenport	1985–2000
Andrew K. Benton	2000–2019
James A. Gash	2019–present

In 1969, Pepperdine bought the Orange University College of Law in Santa Ana, California, which became the School of Law and moved to the Malibu campus in 1978. What had been a business division offering graduate and undergraduate degrees became a graduate business school in 1968, which in 1971 was named the School of Business and Management. Also in 1971, the School of Education was formed, which in 1981 became the Graduate School of Education and Psychology. Pepperdine administrators used these expansions as justification to change the institution's name to Pepperdine University in 1971.

Pepperdine continued to expand, adding permanent international programs in London and in Florence beginning in 1984 and 1985, respectively. These were followed by similar programs in Buenos Aires, Lausanne, and Shanghai. The School of Business and Management was renamed the Graziadio Business School to honor a gift of $15 million from real estate developer George L. Graziadio Jr., and in 2019 the School of Law was renamed the Caruso School of Law after a gift of $50 million from alumnus Rick J. Caruso. The Malibu campus itself was expanded by the construction of the 50.4 acres (20.4 ha) Drescher Graduate Campus, which was completed in 2003 under the supervision of president Andrew K. Benton.

==== Brush fires ====
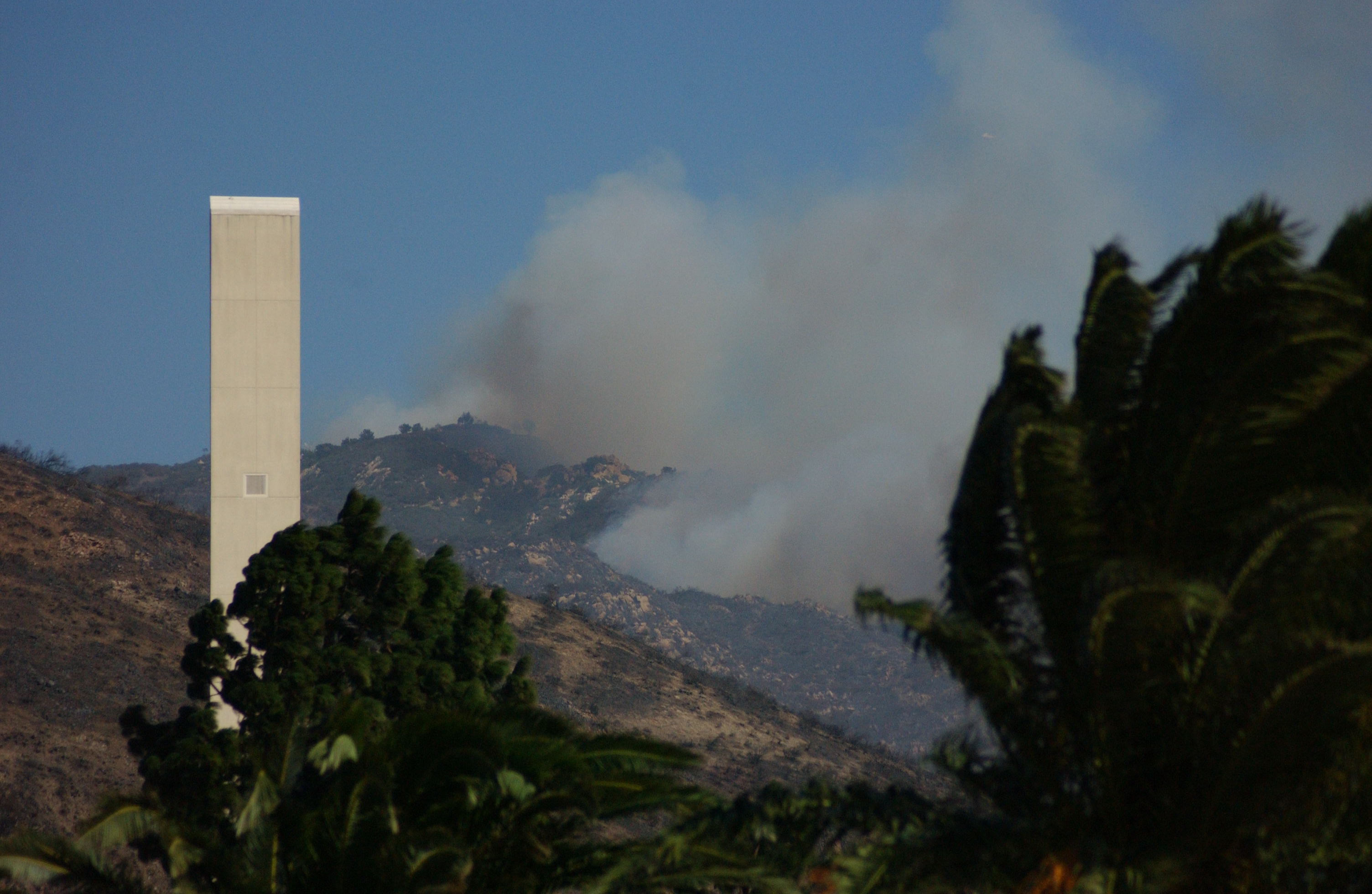
Smoke billows on a hill near the Phillips Theme Tower

Pepperdine's Malibu Campus has often been threatened by brush fires, including in 1985, 1993, 1996, 2007, 2007, 2018, and 2024. The university prepares for the fires by clearing brush 200 feet from all buildings and has developed plans with Los Angeles County Fire Department to shelter faculty, staff, and students in place.

== Campus ==
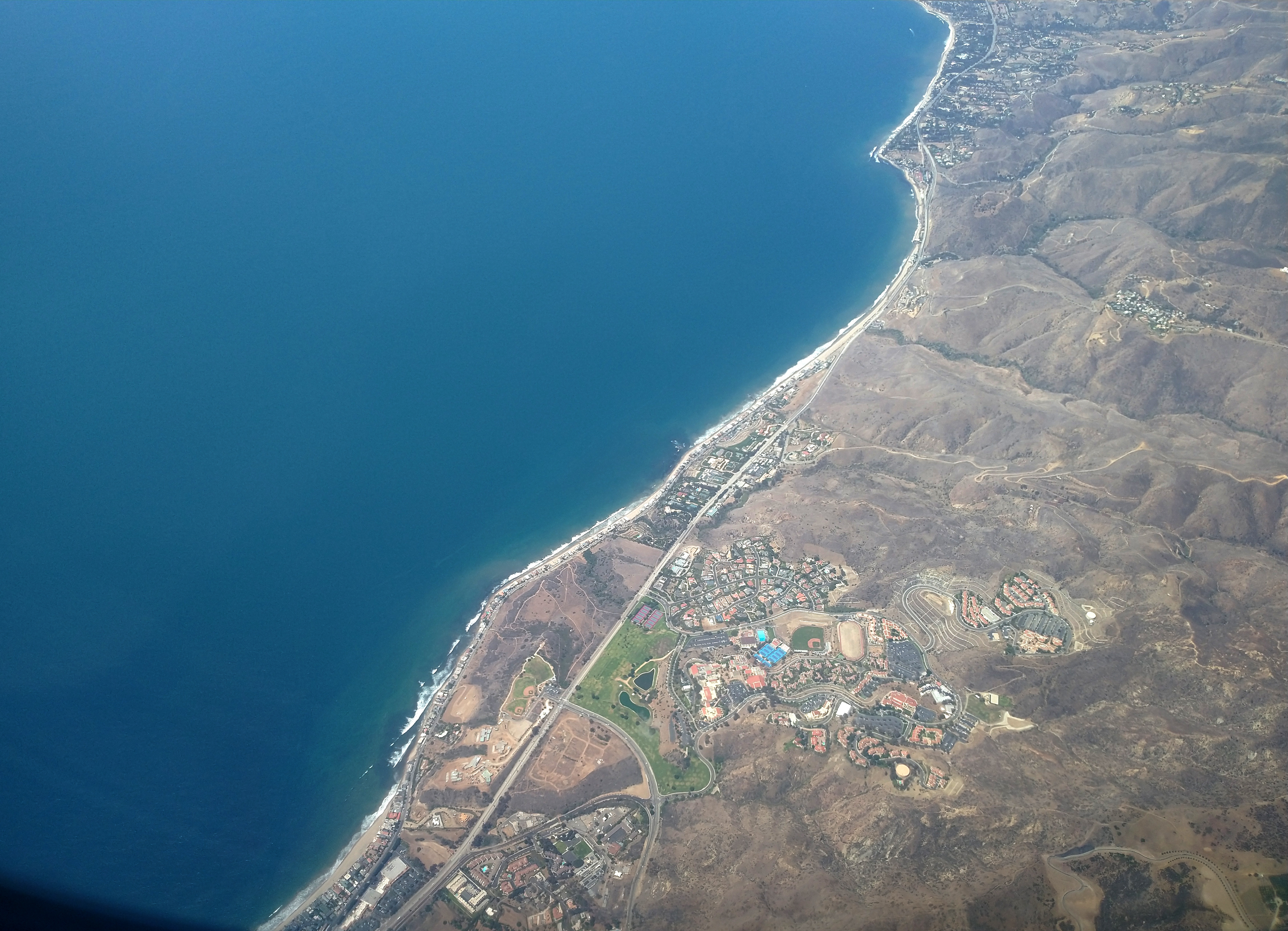
Pepperdine University aerial view in July 2021

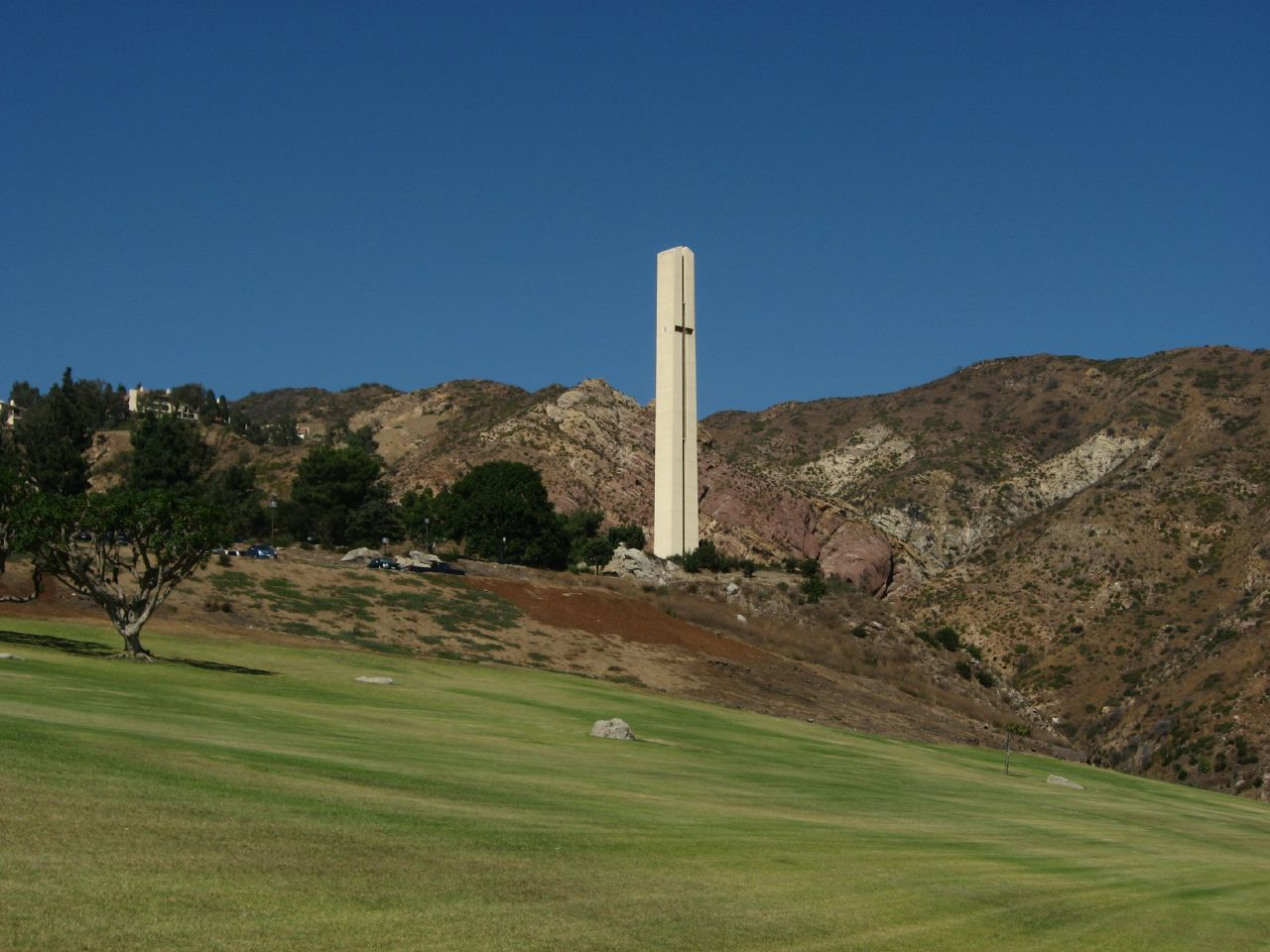
The Phillips Theme Tower with the Santa Monica Mountains in the background (2008)

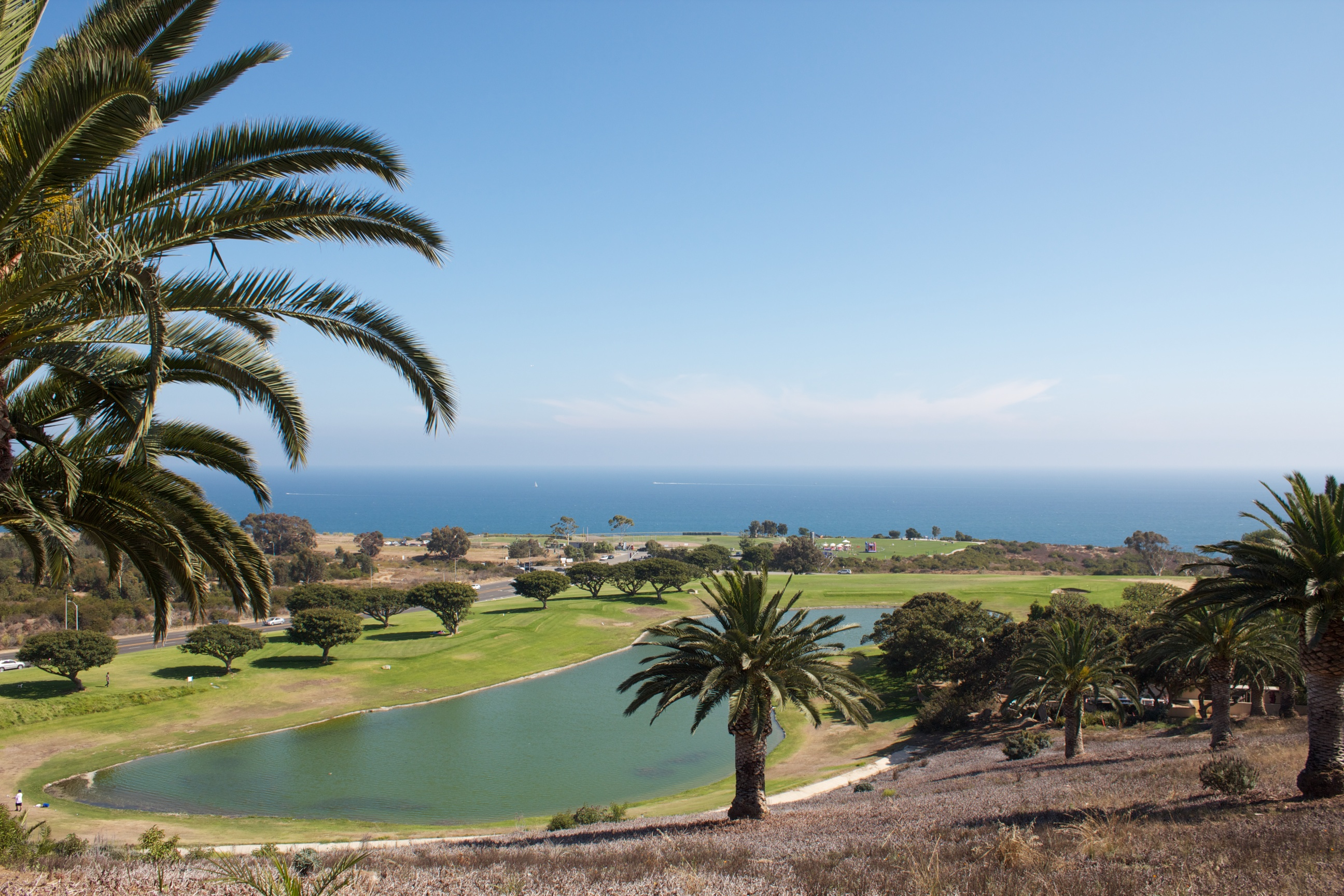
A view of Alumni Park and the Santa Monica Bay beyond (2011)

=== Malibu campus ===
Pepperdine's Malibu campus is situated on 830 acres (340 ha) of the Santa Monica Mountains overlooking the Pacific Ocean and the Pacific Coast Highway. It is its own census-designated place, located in an unincorporated area in Los Angeles County. The campus offers views of the Santa Monica Bay, Catalina Island, the Palos Verdes Peninsula, and much of the westside of Los Angeles. Most buildings are designed in the Mediterranean Revival Style with white stucco walls, red tile roofs, and large tinted windows. The first round of construction on the site was completed in 1973.

The most distinctive feature of the Malibu campus, apart from its location, is the Phillips Theme Tower, a 125-foot obelisk with an embedded cross that stands on the front lawn. The tower was designed by William Pereira in 1972, and construction was completed in 1973. The tower was dedicated in 1974 as a symbol of Pepperdine's dedication to its Christian mission. Following disputes with Malibu residents over the lighting of the cross, the tower has not been illuminated since 1980.

Alumni Park is located on the lowest part of the Malibu campus, adjacent to the Pacific Coast Highway. It is a 30-acre expanse of lawns, trails, hills, ponds and coral trees overlooking the Pacific Ocean. Landscape architects Eric Armstrong and S. Lee Scharfman were responsible for the campus green space planning and design. The park was dedicated in 1979, and is the location of the university's commencement exercises and other campus activities that need a large open space. Overlooking Alumni Park is Stauffer Chapel, with its 3,000 square feet of stained-glass windows designed by Robert and Bette Donovan and constructed in 1973.

The main academic plaza for the undergraduate programs of Seaver College lies on a knoll above Alumni Park and includes Tyler Campus Center, Payson Library, and the Weisman Museum of Art. Undergraduate housing and athletic facilities sit to the northwest of the academic complex. The Caruso School of Law is situated on a hill above these areas. Banowsky Boulevard separates Alumni Park from the main academic complex and is named in honor of William S. Banowsky, the fourth president of Pepperdine. Spur roads to the east lead to faculty housing.

The Drescher Graduate Campus is contiguous with and northwest of the central campus. Construction was completed in 2003. It is home to the School of Public Policy, the Villa Graziadio Executive Center, and the full-time programs of the Graziadio Business School and the Graduate School of Education and Psychology, as well as housing for students and faculty.

=== Graduate campuses ===
The Graziadio Business School and the Graduate School of Education and Psychology are headquartered in West Los Angeles at the Howard Hughes Center next to Interstate 405. These two schools also offer programs at campuses in Malibu, Irvine, and Calabasas.

=== International campuses ===
Pepperdine owns and operates permanent satellite campuses in five countries, with each campus offering semester- and year-long programs for students of Seaver College. The first such program was opened in 1963 in Heidelberg. Programs were then introduced in the South Kensington district of London in 1984 and in Florence in 1985. In 2023, the program in Lausanne was moved to the Chateau d'Hauteville in Blonay – Saint-Légier, Switzerland.

== Academics ==
=== Frank R. Seaver College of Letters, Arts, and Sciences ===
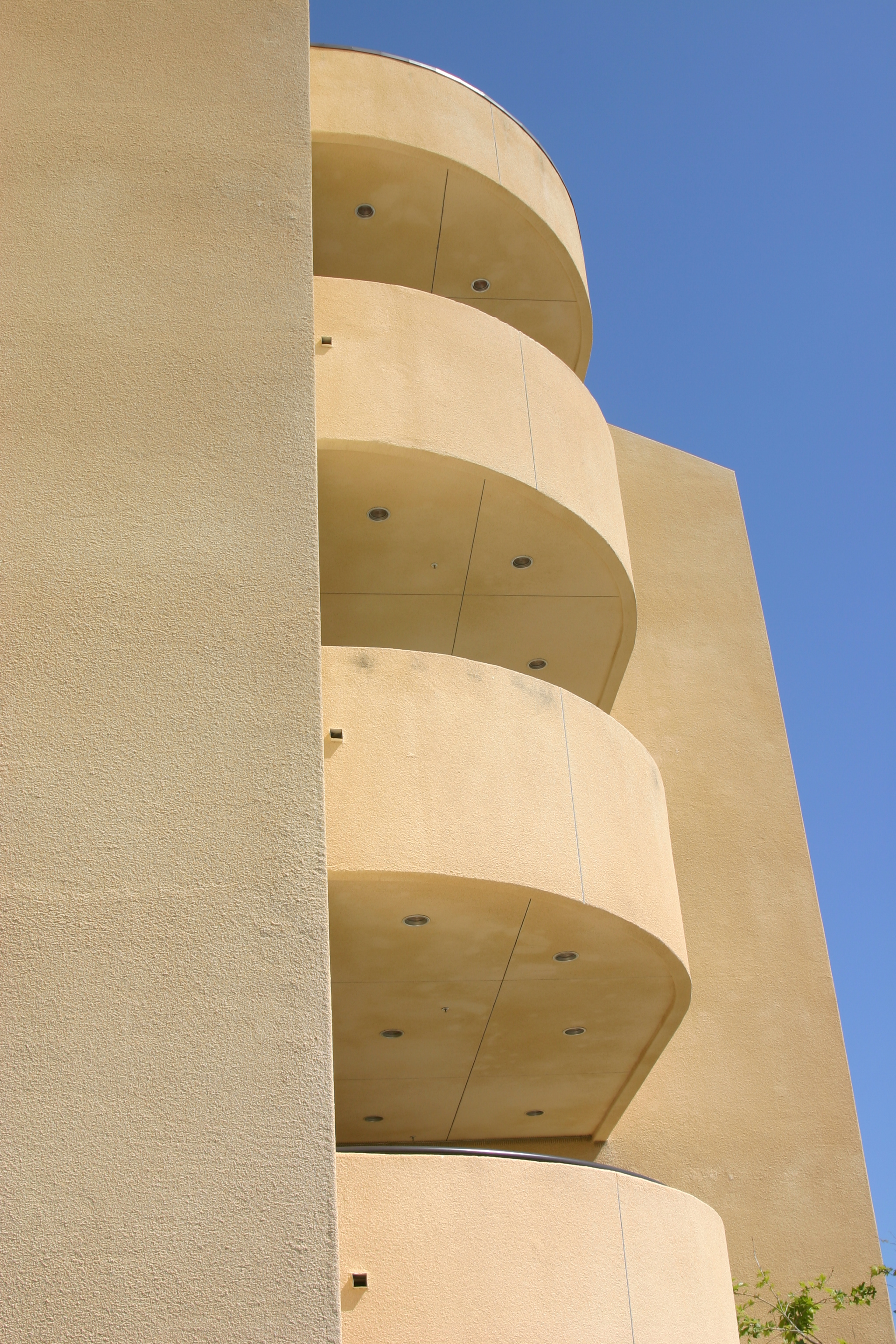
The Keck Science Center at Seaver College, an example of the Mediterranean architecture on the Malibu campus (2007)

Seaver College is named for Frank R. Seaver and his wife Blanche, the principal benefactors of Pepperdine's Malibu campus. The college offers undergraduates a liberal arts education; each candidate for a bachelor's degree must complete a broad program of general education courses. Seaver's general education requirements have received an A rating from ACTA's annual What Will They Learn report for several years running. Seaver students attend classes at the Malibu campus, and most students study abroad either at one of the University's permanent international campuses in Buenos Aires, Florence, Heidelberg, Lausanne, and London or at one of several summer programs.

Seaver College offers 46 majors and 47 minors across eight academic divisions: business administration, communication, fine arts, humanities and teacher education, international studies and languages, natural science, religion and philosophy, and social science.

In addition to bachelor's degrees, the college offers the following graduate degrees: master of arts (MA) in American studies, master of arts (MA) in religion, master of science (MS) in ministry, master of divinity (MDiv), and master of fine arts (MFA) in screen and television writing. Seaver students can also earn both single-subject and multiple-subject teaching credentials.

The Religion Division offers undergraduate and graduate education in ministry, works with Pepperdine's Center for Faith and Learning and Office of Church Relations, and publishes Leaven: A Journal of Christian Ministry.

=== Graziadio Business School ===
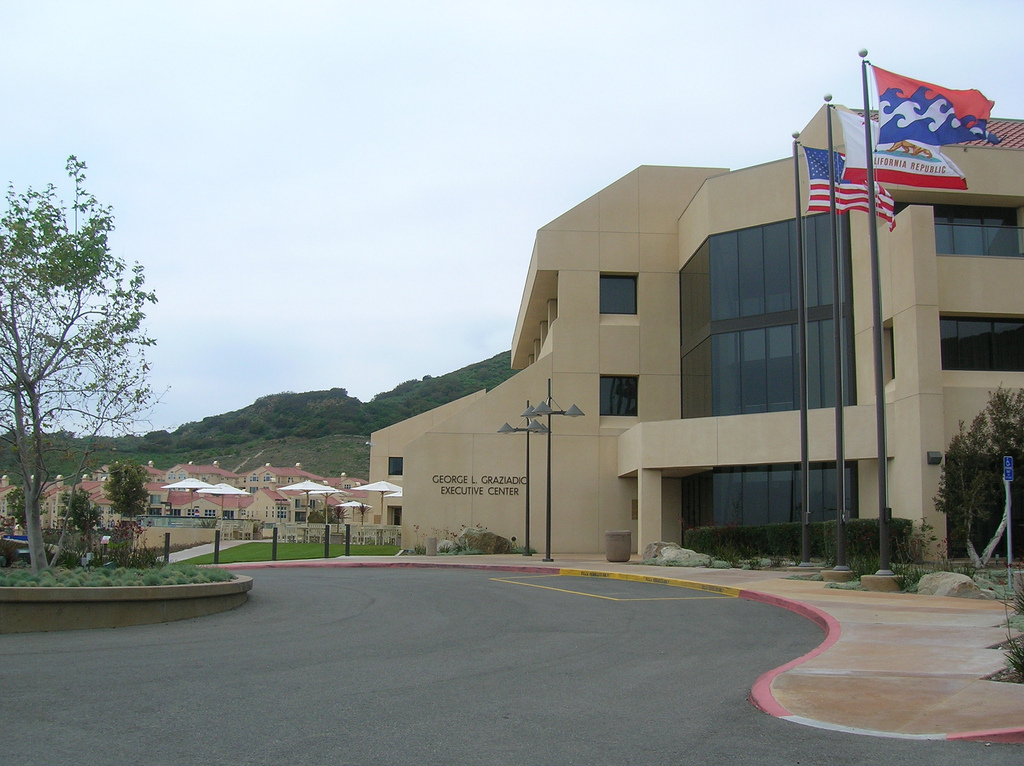
The Graziadio Business Center on the Drescher campus in Malibu (2006)

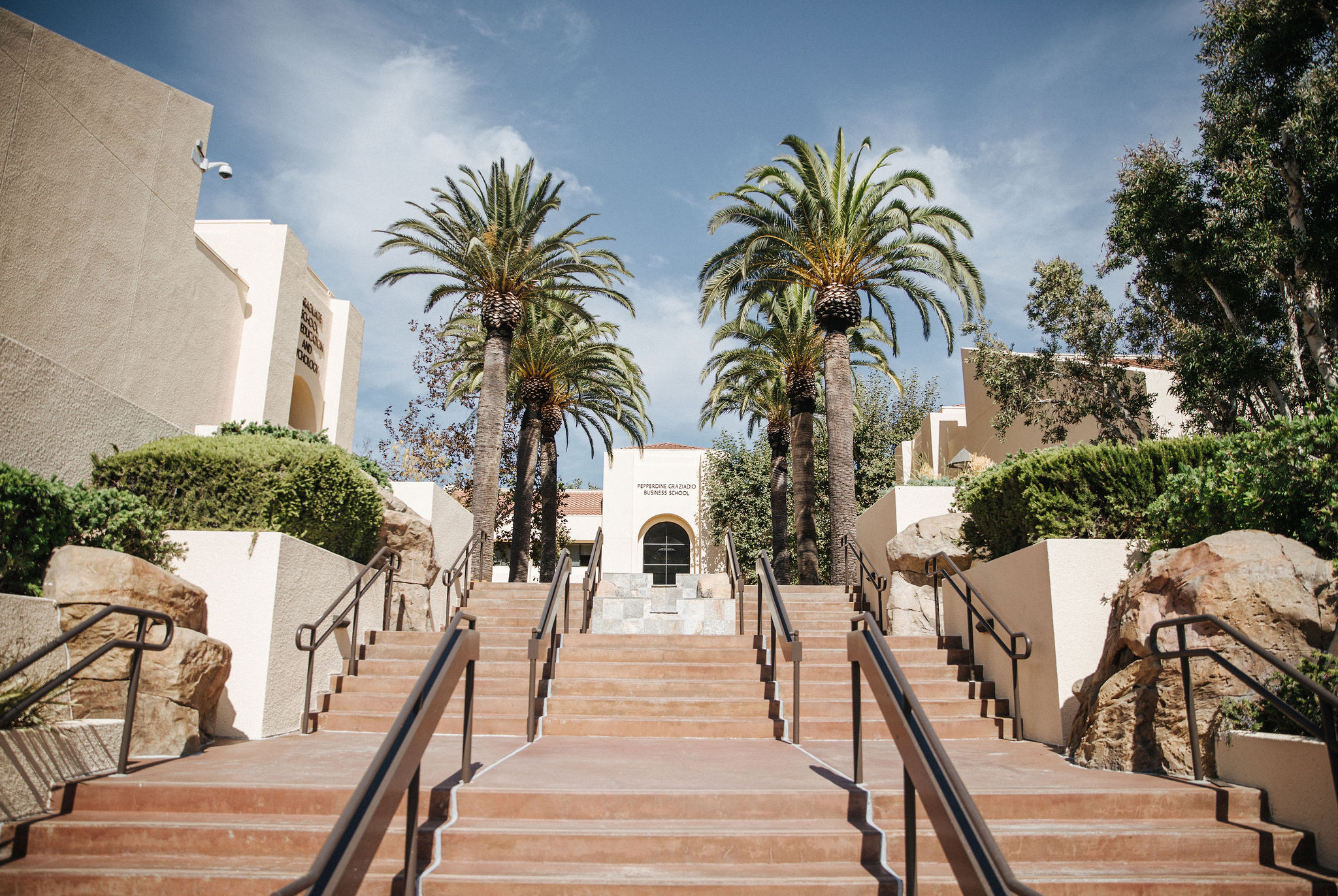
Front entrance of Pepperdine Graziadio Business School

Pepperdine University's Graziadio Business School enrolls approximately 2,000 students in its full-time and part-time degree programs. The school was founded in 1969, and has since graduated more than 47,000 alumni. In 2016, U.S. News & World Report ranked the online MBA program tied for 15th best in the country, and the part-time MBA program was ranked at 29th nationally. In 2016, U.S. News & World Report ranked Pepperdine overall 65th out of 437 business programs in the United States.

=== Caruso School of Law ===
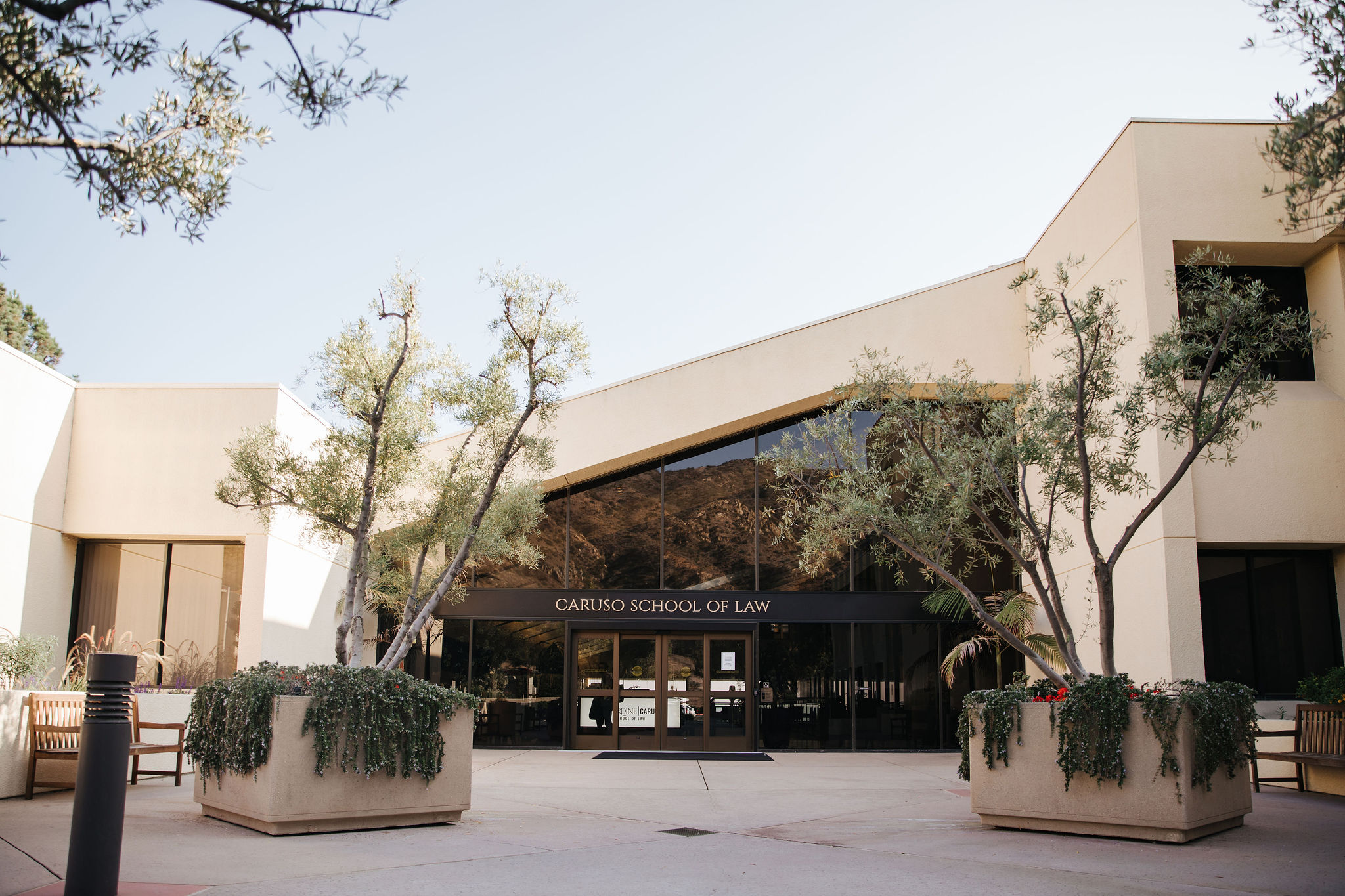
Front entrance of Pepperdine University's Caruso School of Law

The Caruso School of Law is located on the Malibu campus adjacent to Seaver College, and enrolls about 500 students. It is accredited by the American Bar Association, is a member of the Association of American Law Schools, and hosts a chapter of the Order of the Coif. The school's Straus Institute of Dispute Resolution is consistently ranked as a leading dispute resolution program, offering master's and certificate programs. Other degree programs include the Juris Doctor/Master of Divinity with Seaver College, the JD/MBA, JD/MPP, and JD/MDR. The school offers both a summer session and a fall semester at the university's campus in London.

The school is ranked 52nd among the nation's 199 American Bar Association–approved law schools by the 2023 U.S. News & World Report rankings. It is known for its entertainment law program.

=== Graduate School of Education and Psychology ===
The Graduate School of Education and Psychology (GSEP) offers both masters and doctorate programs, including EdD, PsyD, and PhD degrees. Student enrollment is about 1,600. Its programs are accredited by the APA.

=== School of Public Policy ===
The School of Public Policy enrolls approximately 70 graduate students in its two-year master's degree in public policy (MPP).

Joint degree programs include the following:

- MPP/Juris Doctor with the law school.
- MPP/Masters of Dispute Resolution with the law school's highly-rated Straus Institute for Dispute Resolution.
- MPP/MBA degree with the Graziadio Business School.

== Student body ==
Undergraduate demographics as of Fall 2020
Race and ethnicity	Total
White	48%
Hispanic	16%
Asian	12%
Foreign national	10%
Other (Note: Other consists of Multiracial Americans & those who prefer to not say.)	8%
Black	5%
Economic diversity
Low-income (Note: The percentage of students who received an income-based federal Pell grant intended for low-income students.)	17%
Affluent (Note: The percentage of students who are a part of the American middle class at the bare minimum.)	83%

Pepperdine's Fall 2023 enrollment was 9,545 students, of whom 3,629 were at the undergraduate and 5,916 at the graduate and professional levels. In the 2017 academic year, the freshman retention rate was 91%.

Fall freshman profile

	2023	2022	2021	2020	2019	2018	2017
Applicants	12,457	11,466	11,854	11,634	12,764	12,134	11,704
Admits	6,210	5,585	6,249	4,925	4,049	4,664	4,097
% admitted	49.9	48.7	52.7	42.3	31.7	35.0	39.8
Enrolled	732	942	1,024	733	726	803	862
Average GPA	3.65	3.75	3.74	3.69	3.67	3.66	3.64
ACT range	26–32	28–32	25–30	26–31	27–32	26–32	26–31
SAT range	1250–1440	1290–1460	1280–1430	1210–1390	1250–1430	1,700–2,020	1,670–2,020

=== Admissions ===
Some 13,721 students applied for admission to the undergraduate class of 2023, and 4,241 were admitted (30%); Among admitted freshmen, the interquartile ranges for SAT composite scores, ACT composite scores, and unweighted GPAs were 1,300–1,450, 28–32, and 3.64–3.97, respectively.

Admission to Pepperdine is rated as "more selective" by U.S. News & World Report and by the Carnegie Classification of Institutions of Higher Education.

=== Yellow Ribbon Program for Veterans ===
Pepperdine University is part of the Yellow Ribbon Program for Veterans. Like several other colleges and universities that participate in the program, Pepperdine University offers support for an unlimited number of veteran students as well as an unlimited monetary contribution toward each veteran's tuition assistance. As of 2016, 72% of Pepperdine students who are veterans are in the Yellow Ribbon Program which enables Veterans to attend tuition-free.

== Rankings and reputation ==
Academic rankings

National
- Forbes: 125
- U.S. News & World Report: 84
- Washington Monthly: 197
- WSJ/College Pulse: 137

U.S. News & World Report ranked Pepperdine tied for the 84th best national university, tied for 26th in undergraduate teaching, and tied for 27th best college for veterans in its rankings for 2026. Pepperdine was ranked number 1 in the Institute of International Education's 2015 Open Doors Report, with 86.5 percent of all undergraduate students studying abroad during the 2013–2014 academic year.

The law school placed 45th among the 199 American Bar Association accredited law schools by the 2023 U.S. News & World Report rankings. It is known for its entertainment law and dispute resolution program which is currently ranked No. 2 in the nation. In 2018, U.S. News & World Report ranked Pepperdine's business school 65th out of 437 business programs in the United States.

In 2019, the American Council of Trustees and Alumni included Pepperdine in its What Will They Learn? study, which is an annual evaluation system of colleges and universities. The report assigns a letter grade to 1,120 universities based on how many of the following seven core subjects are required: composition, literature, foreign language, American history, economics, mathematics and science. Pepperdine was one of 23 schools to receive an "A" grade, which is assigned to schools that include at least six of the seven designated subjects in their core curriculum.

In 2025, Pepperdine University earned the Research 2 (R2): High Research Activity designation from the Carnegie Classification of Institutions of Higher Education. This classification is awarded to institutions with high levels of research activity, requiring annual research and development expenditures exceeding $5 million and the awarding of at least 20 research doctorates per year.

== Athletics ==
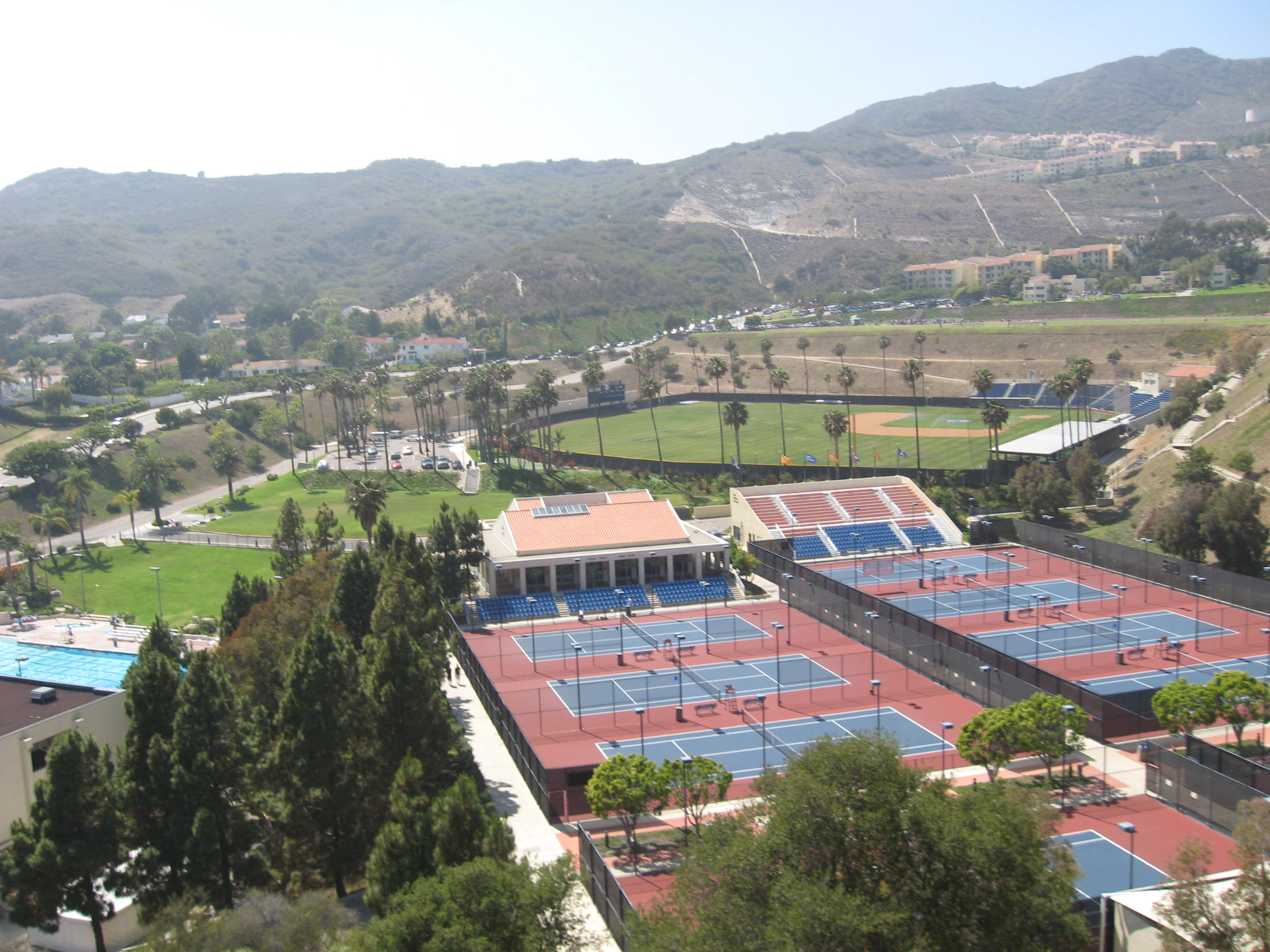
Pepperdine's tennis courts, baseball field, and swimming pool (2007)

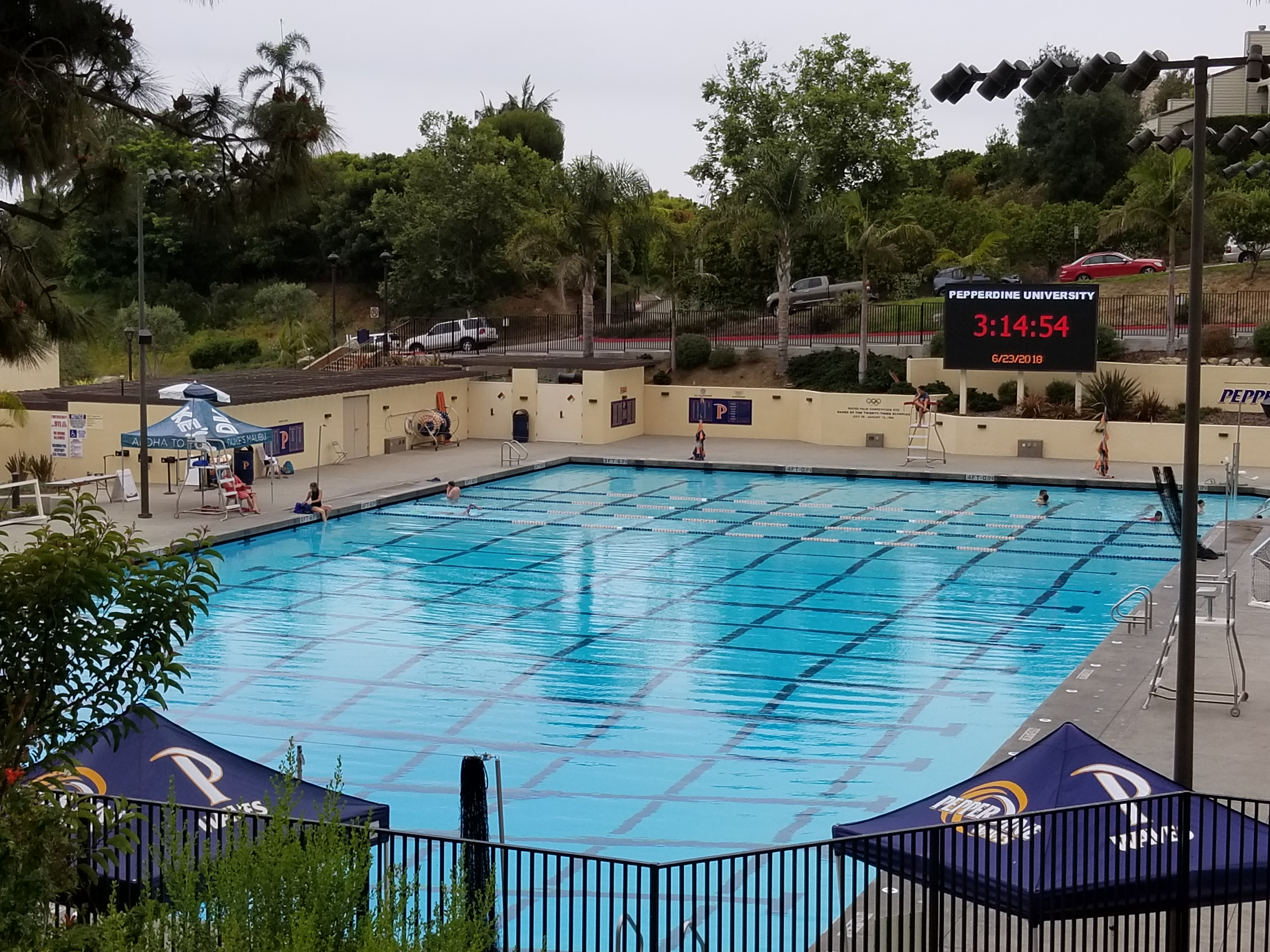
Raleigh Runnels Memorial Pool was the site of the water polo competition at the 1984 Summer Olympics.

Pepperdine University competes in NCAA Division I intercollegiate athletics. The athletic program is a full-time member of the West Coast Conference, with men's volleyball and women's indoor track and field competing as affiliate members of the Mountain Pacific Sports Federation. Pepperdine's teams are known as the Waves.

Pepperdine University is often ranked by the NACDA Director's Cup as having one of the most successful athletic programs for non-football Division I schools, ranking first on three occasions (most recently in 2011–12) and finishing in the top three eight times in the last fifteen years. Pepperdine University sponsors seventeen NCAA Division I intercollegiate athletics teams: baseball, basketball, cross country, golf, tennis, track, volleyball, and water polo teams for men; and basketball, cross country, golf, soccer, swimming and diving, tennis, track, indoor volleyball, and beach volleyball for women. There are also several intercollegiate sports clubs such as women's lacrosse, surfing, and men's rugby.

NCAA Division I team titles (10):

- Men's volleyball (5): 1978, 1985, 1986, 1992, 2005
- Men's golf (2): 1997, 2021
- Baseball (1): 1992
- Men's water polo (1): 1997
- Men's tennis (1): 2006

NCAA Division I individual titles:

- Robbie Weiss (1988 tennis – singles)
- Carlos Di Laura & Kelly Jones (1985 tennis – doubles)
- Jerome Jones & Kelly Jones (1984 tennis – doubles)

The water polo competitions for the 1984 Summer Olympics were held at Raleigh Runnels Memorial Pool on campus.

== Notable people ==
There are currently more than 100,000 living alumni worldwide. Notable alumni of Pepperdine University include prominent scientists, musicians, businessmen and businesswomen, engineers, architects, athletes, actors, politicians, and those who have gained both national and international success. The Pepperdine alumni network consists of more than 30 alumni groups on four continents.

== Demographics ==
Pepperdine University CDP
- Census-designated place
- Location within California Location within the United States
- Coordinates: 34°2′32.20″N 118°42′33.06″W
- Country: United States
- State: California
- County: Los Angeles

Area
  - Total: 0.538 sq mi (1.39 km^{2})
  - Land: 0.538 sq mi (1.39 km^{2})
  - Water: 0 sq mi (0 km^{2})
- Elevation: 482 ft (147 m)

Population (2020)
  - Total: 2,747
  - Density: 5,110/sq mi (1,970/km^{2})
- Time zone: UTC−8 (Pacific)
  - Summer (DST): UTC−7 (PDT)
- GNIS feature ID: 2805260

The United States Census Bureau has designated the Pepperdine University campus as a separate census-designated place (CDP) for statistical purposes. It first appeared as a CDP in the 2020 Census with a population of 2,747.

The CDP is located within Santa Monica-Malibu Unified School District.

Historical population
Census	Pop.	Note	%±
2020	2,747		—
U.S. Decennial Census; 2020

=== 2020 census ===
Pepperdine University CDP, California – Racial and ethnic composition Note: the US Census treats Hispanic/Latino as an ethnic category. This table excludes Latinos from the racial categories and assigns them to a separate category. Hispanics/Latinos may be of any race.
Race / Ethnicity (NH = Non-Hispanic)	Pop 2020	% 2020
White alone (NH)	1,626	59.19%
Black or African American alone (NH)	223	8.12%
Native American or Alaska Native alone (NH)	70	2.55%
Asian alone (NH)	660	24.03%
Native Hawaiian or Pacific Islander alone (NH)	6	0.22%
Other Race alone (NH)	0	0.00%
Mixed race or Multiracial (NH)	26	0.95%
Hispanic or Latino (any race)	136	4.95%
Total	2,747	100.00%

== See also ==
- List of universities and colleges affiliated with the Churches of Christ
