= E. H. Ijams =

President of Lipscomb University
- In office 1934–1943

Personal details
- Born: 1886 Florence, Alabama, U.S.
- Died: July 12, 1982 (aged 95–96) Memphis, Tennessee, U.S.
- Education: Peabody College; Harding College

E. H. Ijams (1886 – July 12, 1982) was an American minister of the Churches of Christ and academic administrator. He was the president of Lipscomb University from 1934 to 1943, and the author of several books.

== Early life ==
Ijams was born in 1886 in Florence, Alabama. He attended Peabody College, where he earned a bachelor of science degree in 1918 and a master's degree in 1927. He earned a Legum Doctor from Harding College in 1934.

== Career ==
Ijams joined the faculty at Lipscomb University in 1923. He was a dean from 1932 to 1934, and the university president from 1934 to 1943. He stepped down as a result of his feud with anti-Premillennialists. By 1962, Ijams was an associate professor of Christian education at the Harding School of Theology in Memphis.

Ijams was the minister of the Central Church of Christ in Nashville from 1925 to 1928 and the Central Church of Christ in Los Angeles from 1928 to 1932. He was the minister of the Belmont Church of Christ in Nashville from 1943 to 1951, the Union Avenue Church of Christ in Memphis from 1953 to 1958, and the Highland Street Church of Christ from 1958 to 1982.

Ijams authored several books about Christianity.

== Personal life and death ==
Ijams married Uma Hartley. They had a son and two daughters, and they resided in Memphis.

Ijams died on July 12, 1982, in Memphis.

== Selected works ==
- Ijams, E. H. (1964). Power to Survive and Surpass. New York: Pageant Press. OCLC 2811886.
- Ijams, E. H. (1973). Friendly Talks to Elders: Simple, Encouraging, Practical Messages to the Bishops over God's People. Memphis, Tennessee: Highland Street Church of Christ. OCLC 6320565.
- Ijams, E. H. (1978). The Reality of God. Nashville, Tennessee: Williams Press. OCLC 4680050.
