= Pepperdine Graziadio Business School =

Graduate business school of Pepperdine University

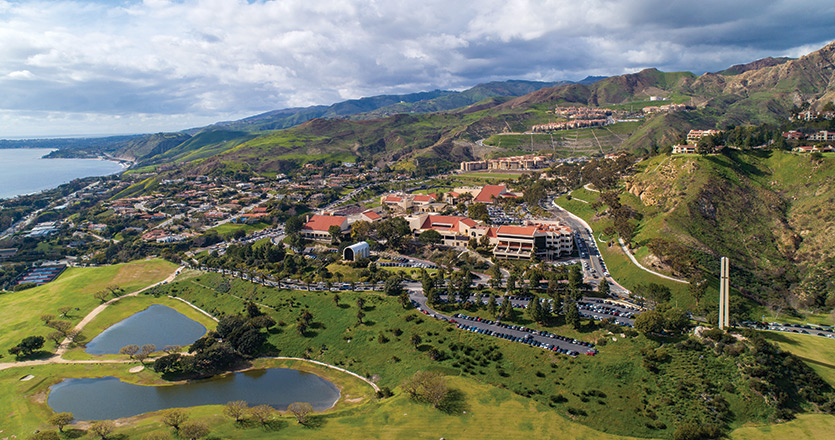
- campus
- Type: Private business school
- Established: 1969
- Parent institution: Pepperdine University
- Affiliations: Church of Christ
- Academic affiliations: AACSB
- Dean: Deborah F. Crown
- Academic staff: 95 full-time faculty 30 adjunct faculty
- Students: 2,072 students
- Postgraduates: 2072
- Location: West Los Angeles, California, United States; 33.9772°N 118.3925°W
- Campus: Suburban, 830 acres (3.4 km^{2})
- Colors: Blue and Orange
- Mascot: Willie the Wave
- Website: bschool.pepperdine.edu
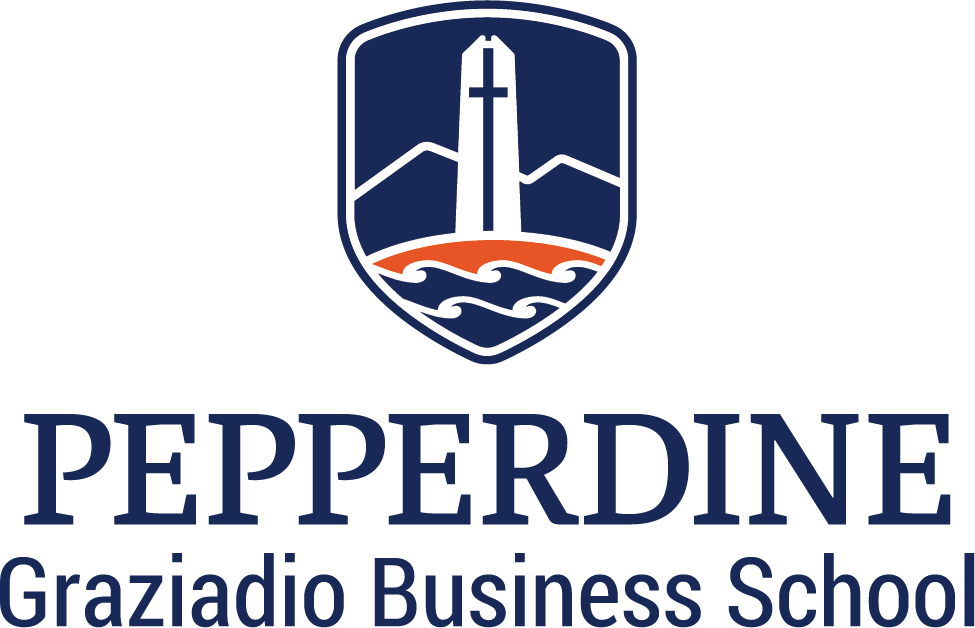

The Pepperdine Graziadio Business School (Graziadio School) is the graduate business school of Pepperdine University, a private research university affiliated with the Churches of Christ with its main campus in Los Angeles County, California. The school offers MBA, Specialized MS, doctorate, and executive degree programs. It is one of the largest graduate business schools in Southern California with more than 50,000 alumni. It is accredited by the Association to Advance Collegiate Schools of Business (AACSB). The business school was established in 1969 and named in honor of George L. Graziadio, Jr., after he donated US$15 million in 1996.

== History ==
The Pepperdine Graziadio Business School was founded in 1969 by Dr. Donald Sime, who also served as the school's first Dean. The first full-time MBA program was launched in 1972.

Deborah Crown serves as the school’s current dean.

== Campuses ==
The Pepperdine Graziadio Business School is headquartered in Malibu, California. The Malibu campus, along with campuses in West Los Angeles, Calabasas, and Irvine, hosts the school's part-time programs. Full-time programs are headquartered at the main Pepperdine University campus in Malibu. International programs take place at various international universities each trimester.

== Rankings ==
Business school rankings

U.S. MBA Rankings
- QS (2026): 71-80
- Bloomberg (2025): 63
- U.S. News & World Report (2026): 89

- In 2024, Pitchbook: Top 100 colleges ranked by startup founders, ranked Pepperdine's MBA program at 32nd in the world.
- U.S. News and World Report ranked the school 88th in Best MBA Full-time Nationwide and 52nd for MBA Part-time.
- In its 2024 edition of The Best Business Schools, The Princeton Review ranked the Graziadio School among the nation's top business programs. The school was also among the top business schools in the West and the top 50 for Online MBA Programs. Pepperdine Graziadio was ranked #2 for “Best MBA for Nonprofit” and #4 for the “Greatest Resource for Minority Students".

== See also ==
- List of business schools in the United States
- Pepperdine University
