= Raleigh Runnels Memorial Pool =

Aquatics venue in Malibu, California, U.S.

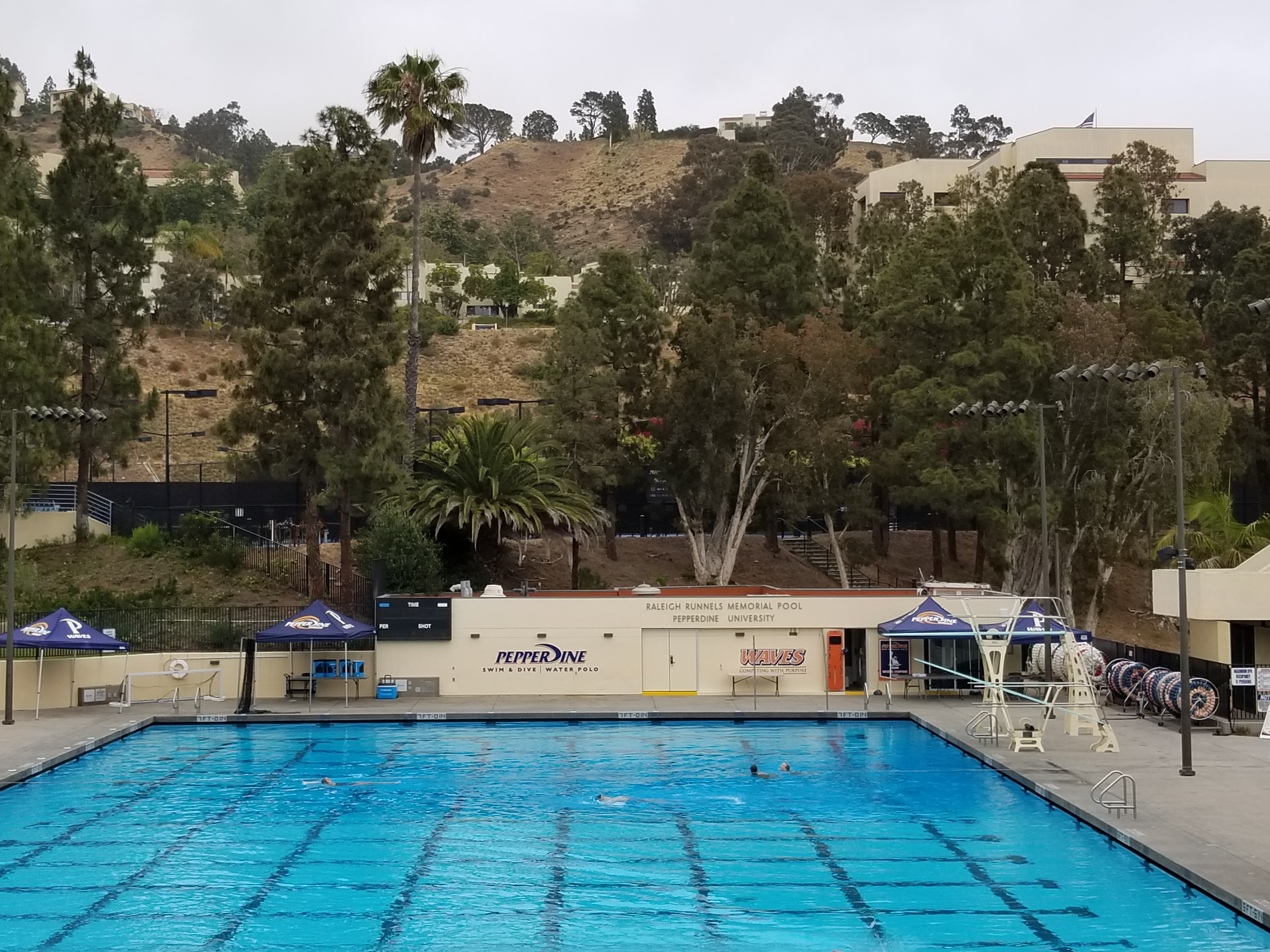
- Interactive map of Raleigh Runnels Memorial Pool
- Location: Malibu, California; United States
- Coordinates: 34.03886°N 118.7102°W
- Owner: Pepperdine University
- Operator: Pepperdine University

Tenants
- Pepperdine Waves women’s swimming and diving (NCAA)

The Raleigh Runnels Memorial Pool is an aquatics venue located on the campus of Pepperdine University in Malibu, California. The pool was constructed in 1975 and dedicated the following year to Raleigh Neal Runnels, the son of Pepperdine Chancellor Dr. Charles Runnels, who died of cancer at 17.

The pool hosted the water polo competitions for the 1984 Summer Olympics in neighboring Los Angeles.
