= George Pepperdine =

American businessman and philanthropist (1886–1962)

- Born: June 20, 1886; Mound Valley, Kansas, United States
- Died: July 31, 1962 (aged 76); Los Angeles, California, United States
- Occupations: Businessman, philanthropist
- Spouses: Lena Rose Baker; Helen Louise Davis.

George Pepperdine (/ˈpɛpərdaɪn/; June 20, 1886 – July 31, 1962) was an American entrepreneur and Christian philanthropist who was the founder of Pepperdine University in California.

== Biography ==
=== Early life ===
George Pepperdine was born on June 20, 1886, on a farm in Mound Valley, Kansas, to a family of English heritage. His parents became members of the Churches of Christ after experiencing a powerful conversion during a tent meeting outside of Parsons, Kansas. Pepperdine graduated from Parsons Business College in Parsons, Kansas.

=== Career ===
In 1909, at the age of 23, he started Western Auto Supply Company in Kansas City, Missouri, with an initial investment of five dollars. With the increasing usage of the automobile, Pepperdine's business thrived, providing high-quality automotive products and services through many retail stores. He moved to California in 1916.

=== Philanthropy ===
In February 1937, during the Great Depression, he founded Pepperdine University as a Christian liberal arts college in Los Angeles California. On September 21, 1937, 167 new students from 22 states and two foreign countries entered classes on a newly built campus on 34 acres (14 ha) in South Central Los Angeles, referred to later as the Vermont Avenue campus. By April 6, 1938, George Pepperdine College was fully accredited by the Northwest Association.

He had a desire to discover "how humanity can be helped most with the means entrusted to [his] care. [He] consider[ed] it wrong to build up a great fortune and use it selfishly." Pepperdine voiced his twofold objective for the college that bore his name, "First, we want to provide first-class, fully accredited academic training in the liberal arts ... Secondly, we are especially dedicated to a greater goal—that of building in the student a Christ-like life, a love for the church, and a passion for the souls of mankind."

=== Personal life ===
He married Lena Rose Baker in 1907 in Kansas. She died in 1930, and he remarried in 1934 to Helen Louise Davis.

=== Death ===
He died in California in 1962.

== General and cited references ==
- Clark, Richard L.; Bates, Jack W. (1959). Faith is my fortune: a life story of George Pepperdine. Pepperdine College Book Store.
- Youngs, Bill (1976). Faith was his fortune: the life story of George Pepperdine. Pepperdine Univ Pr. ISBN 978-0932612052.
