= List of Pepperdine University people =

The following is a list of notable people associated with Pepperdine University, located in the American city of Malibu, California.

== Notable alumni ==
=== Academia ===
- Mike Aamodt (B.A., 1978) – industrial and organizational psychology researcher
- Christopher Chetsanga (B.S., 1964) – Zimbabwean scientist who discovered two enzymes that repair damage to DNA
- Michael A. O'Donnell – adolescent wellness researcher
- Michael Shermer (B.A., 1976) – founder of The Skeptics Society
- Kirk Snyder (M.A., 1991) – LGBTQ+ business communication researcher

=== Business ===
- Rick J. Caruso (J.D., 1983) – chief executive officer of Caruso Affiliated
- Benjamin de Rothschild (1984) – chairman of the Edmond de Rothschild Group
- Julia Hartz (B.A., 2001) – founder and CEO of Eventbrite
- George Randolph Hearst III (B.A. 1977) – publisher of the Times Union newspaper in Albany, New York and director of the Hearst corporation
- Sophia Hutchins (B.S., 2019) – chief executive officer of LUMASOL and executive director of the Caitlyn Jenner Foundation
- Rod Menzies (MBA, 1988) – entrepreneur
- Oscar Munoz (M.B.A., 1986) – president and CEO of United Airlines
- Greg Popovich (M.B.A. 1996) – owner of Castle Rock Winery
- Nicolette Rankin – entrepreneur
- Jeffrey Sprecher – founder and CEO of Intercontinental Exchange and current chairman of the New York Stock Exchange
- Dean Stoecker – founder, chairman and former CEO of Alteryx
- Robert Tchenguiz (LL.B., 1982) – London-based property tycoon
- Cem Uzan (B.A.) – owner of defunct Uzan Group Co, politician
- Neil Clark Warren (1956) – chairman and co-founder of eHarmony.com
- Kelly Zong (B.A., 2004) – president of the Hangzhou Wahaha Group founded by her father, Zong Qinghou

=== Entertainment ===
- Joseph Baena – actor and fitness model
- Les Baxter – soundtrack and exotica composer
- D.J. Caruso – film director
- Marshall Colt – actor, McClain's Law; later marriage and family therapist in San Diego
- Chace Crawford – actor, Gossip Girl, The Boys
- Andrew de Burgh – film director, Just One Drink
- Pat Dubar – singer, Mind Funk
- Cami Edwards – cast member, Laguna Beach
- Douglas Emerson – former child actor, The Blob and Beverly Hills, 90210
- Kim Fields (1995) – actress, U.S. TV sitcoms The Facts of Life and Living Single
- Kimberly Forsyth – Miss Arkansas USA 2006
- Brad Fuller – video game composer (M.S. technology management 2006)
- Lillian Glass – author, TV commentator, body language expert
- Madison Hildebrand – star of Bravo Channel's Million Dollar Listing
- Darby Hinton – actor, Daniel Boone
- Kelly Hu – Miss Teen USA 1985 and actress
- Ashley Jones – television actress, The Bold and the Beautiful
- Montell Jordan – R&B recording artist famous for his hit 1995 single, "This is How We Do It"
- Till Kahrs – recording artist, singer-songwriter, communication skills expert
- Nicole Kidman – actress
- Marlene King – television writer, creator of Pretty Little Liars
- John Lasseter – animator and chief creative officer of Pixar Entertainment
- Carla Laureano – RITA award-winning author of Five Days in Skye
- Coco Lee – member of K-pop duo CocoSori
- Jeff Loveness – screenwriter, Jimmy Kimmel Live!, Rick and Morty, Ant-Man and the Wasp: Quantumania
- Chloe Lukasiak – Dance Moms
- Kate Mansi – television actress, Days of Our Lives, General Hospital
- Rob Moore – vice chairman of Paramount Pictures
- Shana Morrison – singer/songwriter
- Tahj Mowry – television actor, the WB's Smart Guy and ABC Family's Baby Daddy
- Tamera Mowry – television actress, ABC and The WB Sister, Sister, Lifetime Television's Strong Medicine, and co-host and producer of The Real
- Tia Mowry – television actress, ABC and WB sitcom Sister, Sister, BET's The Game and Netflix's Family Reunion
- Brandy Norwood – Grammy Award-winning R&B artist, television, movie and Broadway actress, UPN sitcom Moesha, BET's The Game and Kennedy Center's Chicago
- Eric Christian Olsen – actor
- Mike Richards – executive producer, The Price Is Right, Let's Make a Deal, Wheel of Fortune, Jeopardy!
- Elena Rossini – filmmaker, documentary film The Illusionists
- Meredith Salenger – actress
- George Schlatter – Emmy-winning television producer and director, Rowan & Martin's Laugh-In
- Bui Simon – Miss Universe 1988 and Miss Thailand 1988
- Francesca Marie Smith – voice actress, Helga Pataki on Hey Arnold!
- Matt "Money" Smith – southern California sports radio personality
- Clayton Snyder – actor, sitcom Lizzie McGuire
- Michael Waldron – screenwriter, Rick and Morty, Loki, Doctor Strange in the Multiverse of Madness
- David N. Weiss – screenwriter, The Rugrats Movie, Shrek 2, The Smurfs

=== Literature and the arts ===
- Pierce Brown – author of the sci-fi dystopian Red Rising series
- Sharon M. Draper – realistic fiction and young-adult fiction novelist
- Jamie J. Quatro – literary fiction writer
- Rebecca Zanetti – romance novelist

=== Fine arts ===
- Kevin A. Short – painter and printmaker

=== Media ===
- Michelle Fields (B.A., 2011) – political reporter
- Stefan Holt (B.A., 2009) – news anchor for WNBC-TV, New York
- Adam Housley (B.A. 1994) – national correspondent for Fox News Channel, Los Angeles correspondent, former Milwaukee Brewers and Detroit Tigers baseball player; Emmy winner
- Ash Perez – comedian, writer, and actor from The Try Guys and BuzzFeed
- Zafar Sobhan – editor of the Dhaka Tribune
- Anna Song (B.A., 1999) – KATU investigative reporter, weekend anchor (1999–present), 2007 Emmy for Human Interest News Series, 2007 Regional Edward R. Murrow award for investigative reporting
- Bill Weir – co-anchor of ABC News' Nightline
- Joel Widzer (B.S., 1986) – author and correspondent, MSNBC

=== Politics and government ===
- André Birotte Jr. (J.D., 1991) – judge of the United States District Court for the Central District of California, 2014–present
- Rod Blagojevich (J.D., 1983) – governor of Illinois, 2003–2009
- Jeffrey Boyd (J.D., 1991) – justice of the Supreme Court of Texas, 2012–present; former editor-in-chief of the Pepperdine Law Review
- Mike Cernovich (J.D., 2004) – political commentator and social media personality
- Talis Colberg (J.D., 1983) – attorney general of Alaska, 2006–2009
- Paris Dennard (B.A., 2005) – Republican Party political strategist
- Chris DeRose (J.D., 2005) – clerk of the Superior Court of Maricopa County, Arizona, 2018–2019
- Jennifer Dorsey (J.D., 1997) – judge of the United States District Court for the District of Nevada, 2013–present
- Colleen Graffy (B.A., 1979) – U.S. deputy assistant secretary of State for Public Diplomacy, 2005–2009
- Ivan Doly Gultom (1991) – member of the People's Representative Council of Indonesia, 2017–present
- James Hahn (B.A., 1972; J.D., 1975) – mayor of Los Angeles, 2001–2005; judge of the Los Angeles County Superior Court, 2008–present
- Janice Hahn – U.S. representative, 2011–2016, California's 36th Congressional District and California's 44th Congressional District; supervisor of the Los Angeles County Board of Supervisors, 2016–present
- Brian Jack (B.A., 2010) – White House political director, 2019–2021
- Ted Kanavas – state senator, Wisconsin State Senate, 2001–2011
- Michelle King – superintendent of Los Angeles Unified School District, 2016-2018
- Joel Kleefisch (B.A., 1993) – state representative, Wisconsin State Assembly, 2005–2019
- Helen Shores Lee (M.A.) – Judge for 10th Judicial Circuit of Alabama
- Jami Miscik (1980) – director of the Office of International Affairs, CIA
- Khalid Abdul Muhammad – African-American black nationalist who came to prominence as a leader in the Nation of Islam and then the New Black Panther Party; after a racially inflammatory 1993 speech at Kean College, was condemned and removed from his position in the Nation of Islam by Louis Farrakhan
- Wiley Nickel (J.D., 2005) - former U.S. congressman from North Carolina
- Danielle Outlaw – chief of the Portland Police Bureau
- Bernard C. Parks – Los Angeles city councilman, 8th District, former Los Angeles police chief
- Todd Russell Platts (J.D., 1991) – U.S. congressman from Pennsylvania, 2001–2013
- Amb. Pierre-Richard Prosper (J.D., 1989) – United States ambassador-at-large for War Crimes Issues
- Robin Sax (J.D., 1997) – author, legal analyst, victim advocate, former prosecutor for Los Angeles County District Attorney's Office
- Diana Shaw – acting inspector general of the Department of State
- Arthur K. Snyder – Los Angeles City Council member, 1967–1985
- Michelle Steel (B.S., 1997) – U.S. representative, 2021–present, CA-48
- Kinga Tshering (MBA) – Bhutanese politician and businessman
- Widiyanti Putri Wardhana – Minister of Tourism of Indonesia, 2024–present
- Brandon Williams (B.A., 1990) – U.S. representative, 2023–present, NY-22
- Kimberly Yee – Arizona state treasurer, 2019–present
- Katie Sharon (née Black) Zacharia (B.A. 2007, J.D. 2011), political spokesperson and former White House press secretary (October 12, 2026 - October 16, 2026)

=== Religion ===
- Paul Egertson (B.A., 1955) – bishop of the Evangelical Lutheran Church in America

=== Sports ===
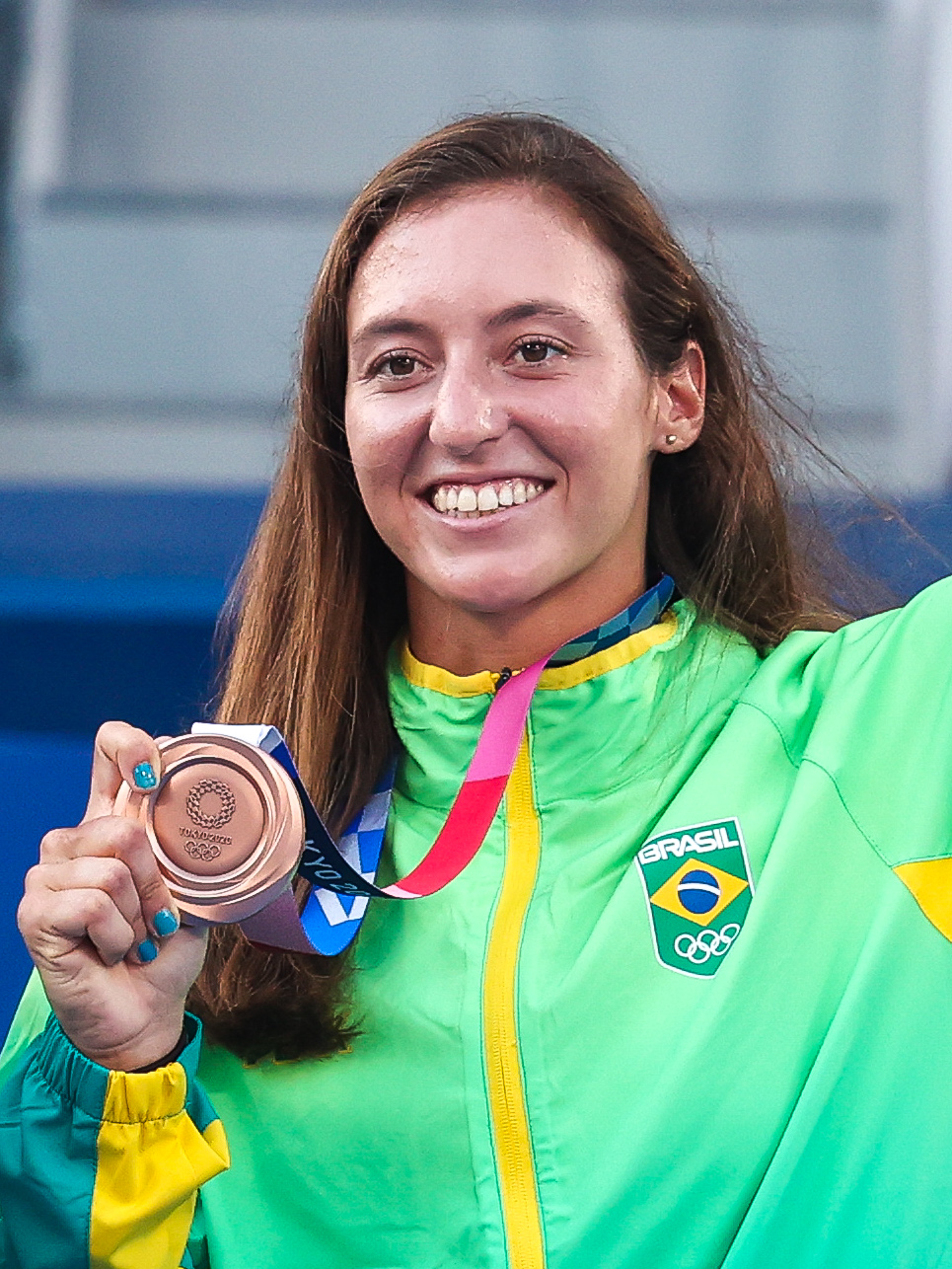
Luisa Stefani, tennis player, first Brazilian to win a medal in Olympic tennis and first Brazilian woman to win a mixed doubles title at the Australian Open

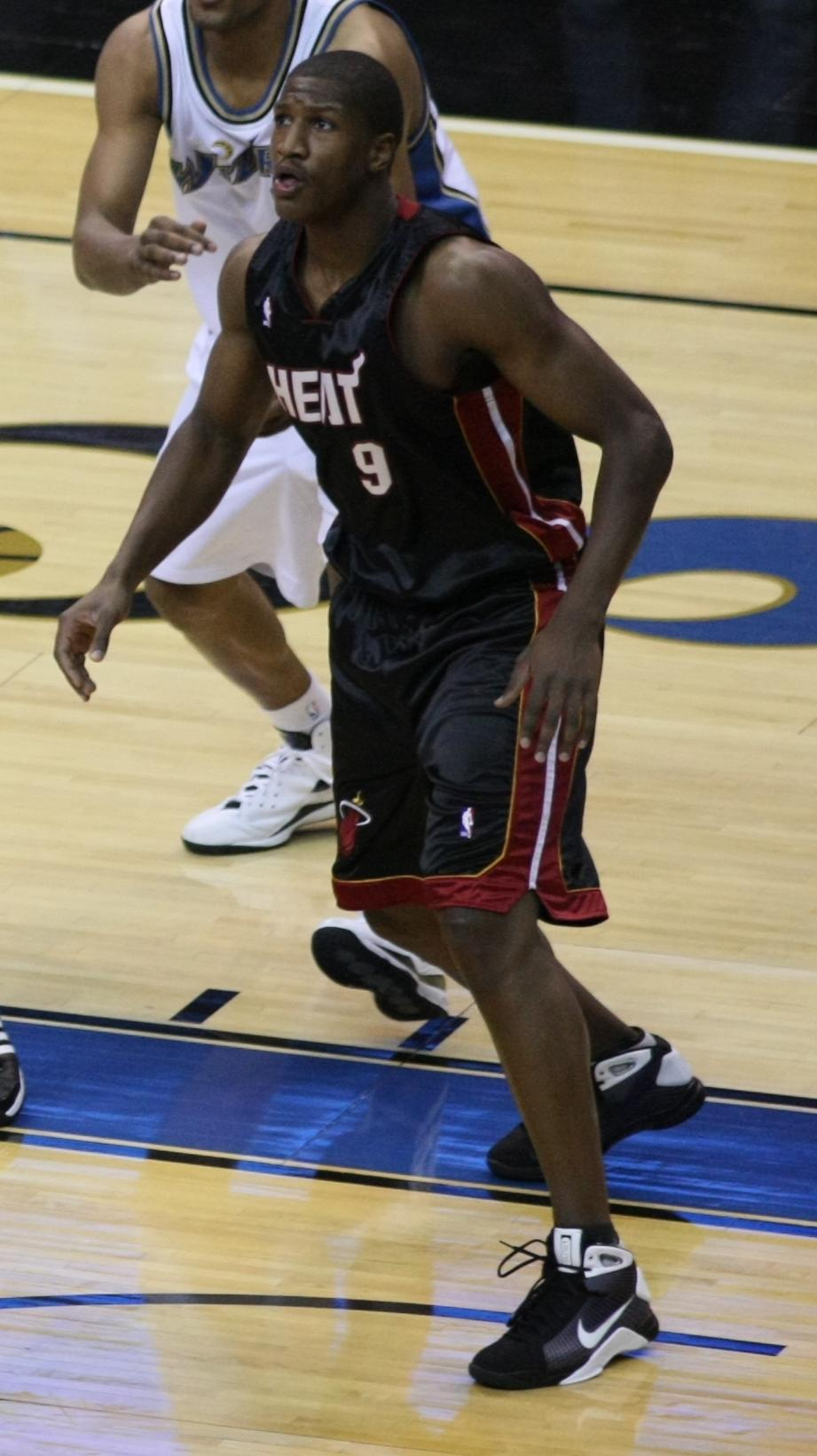
Yakhouba Diawara

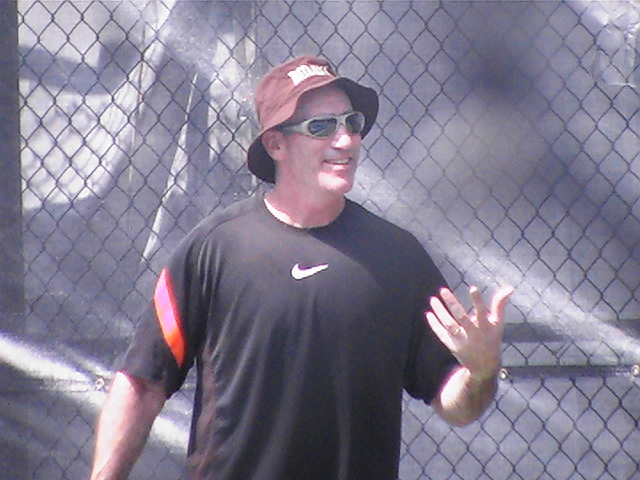
Brad Gilbert

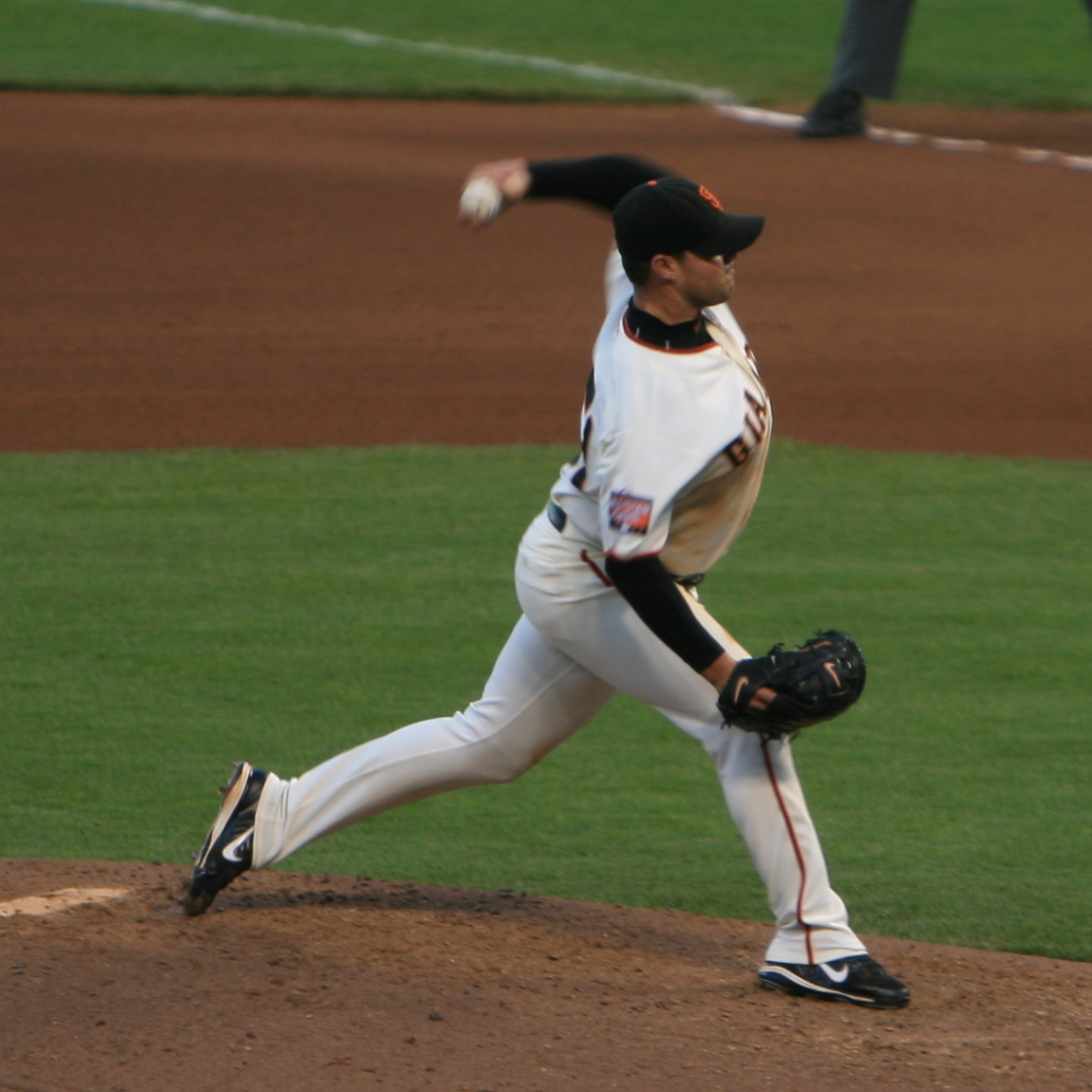
Noah Lowry

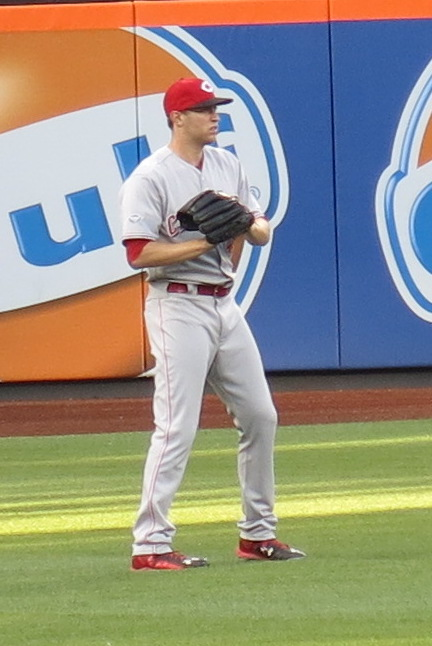
Jon Moscot

- Alex Acker (2005) – professional basketball player (2005–06; 2008–09 Detroit Pistons, Los Angeles Clippers)
- Brandon Armstrong (2001) – former professional basketball player (2001–04; New Jersey Nets)
- Sarah Attar – Olympic 800 meter runner
- Dain Blanton (1994) – 2000 Olympic gold medalist in beach volleyball
- Ricardo Brown (1980) – basketball player drafted in 1979 by Houston Rockets; Southern California Player of the Year in 1979; played professional basketball in the Philippine Basketball Association (1983–90); member of PBA Hall of Fame (2009) and Pepperdine University Hall of Fame (1995)
- Richard Cho – former general manager of Portland Trail Blazers
- Doug Christie (1992) – retired professional basketball player (1992–2007; Los Angeles Lakers, New York Knicks, Toronto Raptors, Sacramento Kings, Orlando Magic, Dallas Mavericks and Los Angeles Clippers)
- Bob Ctvrtlik (1985) – 1988 Olympic gold medal volleyball team member, member of International Olympic Committee
- Yakhouba Diawara (2005) – power forward for the Miami Heat
- Craig Edwards – former professional tennis player, semi-finalist in doubles at 1980 Australian Open
- Eddie Edwards – former professional tennis player, 42 ATP singles, 40 ATP doubles
- Barry Enright (2007) – pitcher for the Arizona Diamondbacks
- Jim Everett – former NFL QB, received his MBA from Pepperdine
- Mike Fetters – former professional baseball player (1989–2004; California Angels, Milwaukee Brewers, Oakland Athletics, Baltimore Orioles, Los Angeles Dodgers, Pittsburgh Pirates, Arizona Diamondbacks and Minnesota Twins)
- Greg Genske – sports agent
- Brad Gilbert (1982) – former world #4 tennis player; prominent coach of Andre Agassi, Andy Murray
- Jason Gore (2000) – PGA Tour professional golfer, 1 PGA Tour win, 7 Korn Ferry Tour wins; chief of players for the PGA Tour
- Dan Haren – professional baseball player; 2007 A.L. All Star Starting Pitcher (Arizona Diamondbacks, Los Angeles Angels of Anaheim)
- Ginger Helgeson-Nielsen – former professional tennis player who holds the all-time match winning percentage at Pepperdine
- Kim Hill (2013) – USA Volleyball National Team
- Adam Housley (1994) – former professional minor league baseball player, drafted by the Montreal Expos
- Katherine Hull (2003) – professional golfer
- Daniel Johnson (2008) – professional basketball player (Adelaide 36ers, Australasian NBL)
- Dennis Johnson (1976) – Basketball Hall of Famer, former professional basketball player (1977–90; Seattle SuperSonics, Phoenix Suns and Boston Celtics)
- Danielle Kang – 6-time LPGA Tour winner, including 2017 Women's PGA Championship
- Chad Kreuter – former professional baseball player (1988–2003; Texas Rangers, Detroit Tigers, Seattle Mariners, Chicago White Sox, Anaheim Angels, Kansas City Royals and Los Angeles Dodgers)
- Jennifer Lacy – professional basketball player, Phoenix Mercury and Atlanta Dream
- Robert Lansdorp – professional tennis coach who coached several players to #1 in the world
- Martin Laurendeau – former professional tour tennis player
- Mike Leach – head football coach at Texas Tech 2000–2009, Washington State 2012–2019 and Mississippi State 2020–2022
- Noah Lowry – professional baseball player (San Francisco Giants)
- Stacy Margolin (born 1959) – tennis player
- Boaz Merenstein (born 1970) – Israeli tennis player
- Glenn Michibata – former professional tour tennis player
- Tim Montez (1984) – college baseball coach of Jacksonville
- Jon Moscot – American-Israeli major league baseball pitcher (Cincinnati Reds)
- Merrill Moses (2000) – water polo goalie for USA national team (2008 Olympic silver medalist)
- David Newhan – professional baseball player (Houston Astros)
- Will Ohman – professional baseball player (Los Angeles Dodgers)
- Leo Palin – former professional tennis player, 92 singles ATP, 111 doubles ATP
- Rob Picciolo – former professional baseball player (1977–85; Oakland Athletics, Milwaukee Brewers and California Angels)
- Steve Rodriguez – major league infielder for the Boston Red Sox and Detroit Tigers; player and head coach for the Waves baseball team
- Sean Rooney (2004) – USA men's national volleyball team, 2008 gold medalist
- Dane Sardinha – professional baseball player (Detroit Tigers)
- Mike Scott – former professional baseball player (1979–91; New York Mets and Houston Astros) and winner of the 1986 NL Cy Young Award
- Jesse Smith – USA men's water polo Olympic team 2000, 2004, 2008 (2008 Olympic silver medalist)
- João Soares – former professional tennis player, 74 ATP singles, 49 ATP doubles
- Andy Stankiewicz – former professional baseball player (1992–98; New York Yankees, Houston Astros, Montreal Expos and Arizona Diamondbacks)
- Jackson Stormo (born 1999) – basketball player in the Israeli Basketball Premier League
- Andrew Sznajder – former professional tour tennis player
- Eric Thames – professional baseball player for the Milwaukee Brewers
- Sahith Theegala – 1-time PGA Tour winner, current defending Fortinet Champion
- Malcolm Thomas – professional basketball player for Utah Jazz
- Mychel Thompson – former professional basketball player who played for the Cleveland Cavaliers; brother of NBA star Klay Thompson
- Derek Wallace – former professional baseball player (1996–99; New York Mets and Kansas City Royals)
- Robbie Weiss – former professional tennis player
- Lynn Williams – professional soccer player, member of USWNT
- Randy Wolf – professional baseball player
- Danny Worth – professional baseball player (Detroit Tigers)

== Notable faculty ==
- Geraldine Decker – opera singer with the Metropolitan Opera
- Craig Detweiler – director of Center for Entertainment, Media, and Culture
- Cynthia Doerner (born 1951) - Australian tennis player and coach
- Joel S. Fetzer – distinguished professor of political science
- Allen Fox (born 1939) – tennis player (ranked as high as # 4) and coach
- Bruce Herschensohn (born 1932) – senior fellow School of Public Policy
- Linda Livingstone – dean of the Graziadio School of Business and Management (2002–2014)
- Merrill Moses (born 1977) – associate head coach in water polo, three-time Olympian and silver medalist
- Christopher Parkening – distinguished professor of music
- L. Timothy Perrin – former law school vice dean (2007–2012), former president of sister school Lubbock Christian University (2012–2019)
- Kenneth Starr – former law school dean
- Ben Stein – law professor (1990–97)
- Eliot Teltscher (born 1959) – professional tennis player
- Cornel West (born 1953) – philosopher, political activist, social critic, actor, and public intellectual

== List of university presidents ==
The following persons served as university president:

| No. | Image | Name | Term start | Term end | Refs. |
|---|---|---|---|---|---|
| 1 | | Batsell Baxter | 1937 | 1939 | |
| 2 | | Hugh M. Tiner | 1939 | 1957 | |
| 3 | | M. Norvel Young | 1957 | 1971 | |
| 4 | | William S. Banowsky | 1971 | 1978 | |
| 5 | | Howard A. White | 1978 | April 15, 1985 | |
| 6 | | David Davenport | April 16, 1985 | June 30, 2000 | |
| 7 | | Andrew K. Benton | July 1, 2000 | July 31, 2019 | |
| 8 | | Jim Gash | August 1, 2019 | present | |
