= Wahaha =

Wahaha may refer to:

- Wahaha, food and beverages brand in China belonging to Hangzhou Wahaha Group
- Wahaha Joint Venture Company, a joint venture company between Hangzhou Wahaha Group and Groupe Danone
- "Wahaha" (song), a 2007 song by Japanese band Kanjani Eight
- Evil laughter
