= Mission Viejo High School =

Public high school in Mission Viejo, California, United States

Location
- 25025 Chrisanta Drive; Mission Viejo, California 92691; United States; 33°35′49″N 117°40′12″W

Information
- Type: Public high school
- Established: 1966
- School district: Saddleback Valley Unified School District
- Principal: Tricia Osborne
- Teaching staff: 70.61 (FTE)
- Grades: 9–12
- Enrollment: 1,566 (2024–2025)
- Student to teacher ratio: 22.18
- Colors: Scarlet; Gold
- Athletics conference: CIF-SS; Coast View Athletic Association
- Mascot: Pablo the Diablo
- Team name: Diablos
- Website: www.svusd.org/schools/high-schools/mission-viejo

Welcome screen to Mission Viejo High School

Mission Viejo High School is a four-year comprehensive public high school located in Mission Viejo, California, United States, as part of the Saddleback Valley Unified School District. The school has served the area since 1966. Students within its attendance boundaries live in western Mission Viejo, southwest Lake Forest, Trabuco Canyon, Rancho Santa Margarita, and Laguna Hills. Its mascot is Pablo the Diablo and its colors are scarlet and gold. 230 credits are required to graduate. It is the home to one of the only agricultural farms on a high school campus in the Saddleback Valley Unified School District.

Mission Viejo High School, an International Baccalaureate (IB) school since 1985, offers an IB program for academically focused students, awarding approximately 80 IB diplomas in the 2015–2016 school year. The school has been recognized with three Blue Ribbon School Awards and six California Distinguished School honors, most recently in 2024. Its performing arts programs include a marching band that won the WBA 4A division championship in 2016, a drumline that earned multiple High Percussion titles between 1997 and 2003, and four choir ensembles. Notable alumni include golfer Mark O’Meara, Olympic swimmer Brian Goodell, astronaut Michael Lopez-Alegria, soccer player Julie Foudy, NFL quarterback Mark Sanchez, journalist Brianna Keilar, and MLB pitcher Patrick Sandoval.

In the 2022–2023 school year, the school had an enrollment of 1,646 students and 75.3 classroom teachers (on an FTE basis), for a student–teacher ratio of 21.8. 40.9% of students were eligible for free or discounted lunch.

== Academics ==
=== International Baccalaureate ===
Mission Viejo has been an International Baccalaureate (IB) school since July 1985. This program, taught to 80 students, is for academically talented and highly motivated students sponsored and administered by the IB Organization. The students who meet the IB requirements are eligible for the International Baccalaureate Diploma. This school received approximately 80 diplomas in the 2015–2016 school year.

=== Awards and recognition ===
Mission Viejo High School has been awarded the Blue Ribbon School and Award of Excellence by the United States Department of Education on three separate occasions, in 1988–89, 1994–96 and 2001–02, the highest award an American school can receive.

Mission Viejo High School has been recognized six times as a California Distinguished School, in 1988, 1994, 2001, 2009, 2013, and 2024.

== Performing arts ==
=== Marching band ===
The school's marching band is part of the Western Band Association. They have competed in the 5A division every year until 2016, in which they began competing in 4A and won their division at the WBA Class Championships.

The drumline won High Percussion at WBA State Championships each year from 1997 to 2003, excluding 2000.

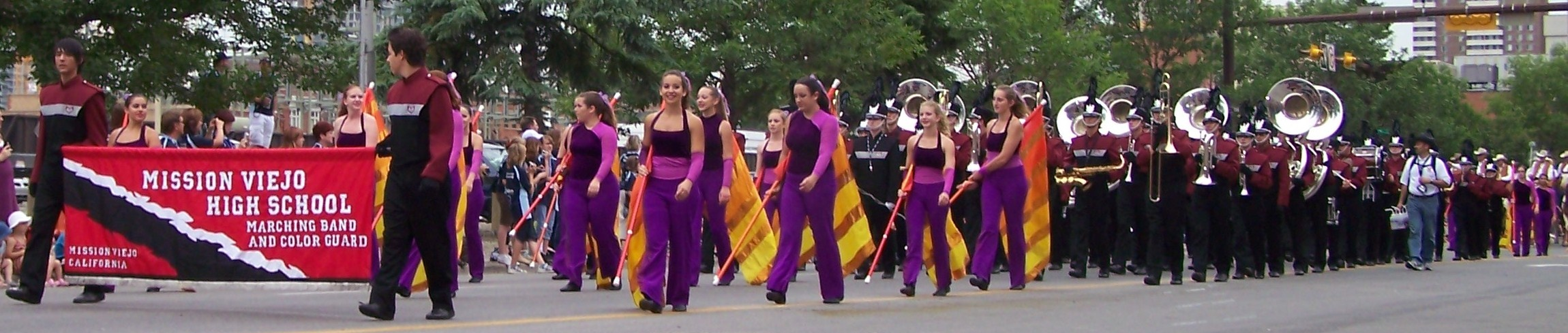
The Mission Viejo High School Marching Band and Color Guard at the 2008 Calgary Stampede Parade in Alberta, Canada

=== Choir ===
The school offers four different choir classes: Concert Choir, Diablo Chorus, Treble Choir and the Chamber Singers.

== Sports ==
Mission Viejo plays in the Coast View Athletic Association for all sports except football where they play in the Alpha League.

=== Football ===
The school's football program has been highly successful with 2 CIF State Championships (2015, 2023), 8 CIF Southern Section titles, and 28 league championships.

From 1999-2017, head coach Bob Johnson led the team team to a record of 338-97-1 and he was inducted into the California High School Football Hall of Fame in 2023. Two of his sons, Bret Johnson and Rob Johnson, coached with him.

Chad Johnson (no relation) took over as head coach in 2017.

=== Girls Basketball ===
The girls basketball program won CIF Southern Section titles in 1982 and 1987.

=== Girls Softball ===
The girls softball program has been very successful over the years. They were named Cal-Hi Sports Softball State Team of the Year in 2014 and 2016. They won CIF Southern Section titles in 2014, 2016 and 2022. They were the runner-up in the CIF Southern Section Division 4 championships in 2026.

== Notable Alumni ==
Name	Class	Description
Rudy Holmes	1970	NFL defensive back for the Atlanta Falcons.
Mark O'Meara	1975	Golfer, winner of the Masters Tournament and the British Open in 1998. Member of World Golf Hall of Fame.
Joe DeRenzo	1976	Musician and bandleader.
Michael Lopez-Alegria	1976	Astronaut, veteran of three Space Shuttle missions and one International Space Station mission.
Matt Sorum	1976	Drummer for The Cult, Guns N' Roses, Velvet Revolver.
Brian Goodell	1977	Olympic champion and former world record-holding freestyle swimmer. At the 1976 Olympic Games, he won gold medals in 400m and 1500m frees.
Bon Thornton	1980	NBA player for the New York Knicks.
Joel L Widzer	1980	Author, television journalist, speaker.
Ralph Saenz	1983	Lead singer for glam metal band Steel Panther (as Michael Starr).
Brianna Keilar	1998	American news anchor.
Rob Adams	1988	Actor, acting coach, owner of The Actors Workshop, football coach.
Julie Foudy	1989	Midfielder for U.S. women's national soccer team from 1987 through 2004. Won two Olympic gold medals and two World Cup championships.
Troy Kopp	1989	Former Canadian Football League and Arena Football League quarterback.
Joe-Max Moore	1989	Professional soccer player.
Preston Burpo	1990	MLS goalkeeper.
Megan McClung	1990	First female United States Marine Corps officer killed in combat during Iraq War.
Scott Von der Ahe	1993	NFL linebacker for the Indianapolis Colts.
David Michael Farrell	1995	Bassist for Linkin Park.
Matt Keneley	1995	NFL defensive tackle for the San Francisco 49ers.
Brianna Keilar	1998	CNN correspondent.
Andreas Gustafsson	1999	Swedish race walker.
Collin Ashton	2001	NFL linebacker who played for the San Diego Chargers.
Jordan Palmer	2002	NFL quarterback who played for the Cincinnati Bengals, Co-founder of RockLive.
Jed Collins	2004	National Football League fullback who played for the Detroit Lions.
Drew Radovich	2005	NFL offensive tackle who played for the Minnesota Vikings.
Nick Reed	2005	NFL defensive end who played for the Minnesota Vikings.
Mark Sanchez	2005	Former NFL quarterback.
Konrad Reuland	2006	Former NFL tight end for the New York Jets and Baltimore Ravens.
Jeff Baca	2008	Former NFL offensive tackle.
Nick Dzubnar	2010	Former NFL linebacker for the San Diego Chargers and Tennessee Titans.
Donothan Bailey	2010	Former gymnast and member of the United States men's national artistic gymnastics team.
Tre Madden	2011	NFL running back for the Seattle Seahawks.
Nick Dzubnar	2010	NFL linebacker for the Chargers and Titans
Garrett Marino	2013	Canadian Football League defensive tackle for the Saskatchewan Roughriders.
Chandler Hutchison	2014	NBA guard for the Chicago Bulls.
Noah Munck	2014	American actor, Gibby Gibson in Nickelodeon's iCarly
Patrick Sandoval	2015	MLB pitcher for the Los Angeles Angels.
Taylor McQuillin	2015	AUSL pitcher for the Chicago Bandits.
Brenden Schooler	2016	NFL safety for the New England Patriots
Tanner Bibee	2017	MLB pitcher for the Cleveland Guardians.
David Morgan	2018	MLB pitcher for the San Diego Padres.
Jarrett Patterson	2018	NFL center for the Houston Texans
Joey Yellen	2019	College football quarterback for the Arizona State Sun Devils, Pittsburgh Panthers, Hawaii Rainbow Warriors and Chapman Panthers
Easton Mascarenas-Arnold	2021	Linebacker for the Cleveland Browns.
Kadin Semonza	2023	College football quarterback for the Ball State Cardinals and the Tulane Green Wave
Dijon Lee	2025	College football cornerback for the Alabama Crimson Tide
Luke Fahey	2026	College football quarterback for the Ohio State Buckeyes
