= Lingoda =

Online language learning platform

Lingoda GmbH
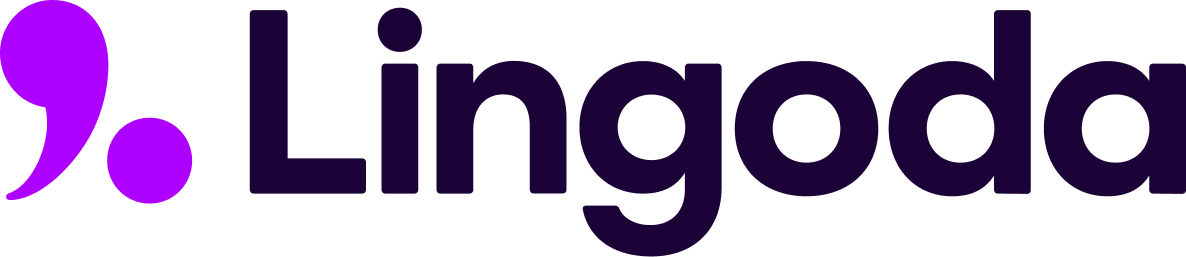
- Type: Private
- Industry: E-learning, language education
- Founded: 2012 (as Easy Languages), 2013 (as Lingoda)
- Headquarters: Berlin, Germany
- Services: Language learning
- Number of employees: 300+
- Website: lingoda.com

Lingoda is a Berlin-based language learning platform founded in 2012 by brothers Fabian and Felix Wunderlich, originally operating under the name Easy Languages before rebranding in 2013. The edtech company offers subscription-based, live online language courses via video conferencing, teaching in English, Business English, German, French, Spanish and Italian. Lingoda’s lessons are taught by qualified native-level instructors and follow the Common European Framework of Reference for Languages (CEFR). In April 2021, EU-Startups reported that Lingoda had served students from almost 200 countries.

== History ==
Lingoda began in 2012 as Easy Languages, offering online lessons primarily in English and German. In 2013, the company rebranded as Lingoda to reflect its focus on global digital education. By 2016, the platform expanded to include French and Spanish courses. In September 2024, Lingoda further broadened its portfolio by launching Italian courses, initially at beginner level. In September 2022, Dominic Rowell was appointed CEO, bringing extensive international leadership experience in sectors ranging from education to media.

The company’s early growth was driven by its subscription-based learning model, which allowed learners to book small-group or private classes at any time. During the COVID-19 pandemic in 2020, Lingoda experienced a reported 200% year-over-year increase in students, as demand for online tutoring marketplaces and virtual language training for professionals surged.

In April 2021, Lingoda secured €57 million in growth funding from Summit Partners, bringing total investment to over €70 million. That year, it also launched two major social integration initiatives: the MATCH programme, supporting internationally trained healthcare workers in Germany, and Match Talent, in partnership with Kiron, to help skilled migrants integrate into the workforce.

Operationally, Lingoda evolved from a primarily B2C model to a dual B2B/B2C business structure. The B2C division targets individual learners worldwide, while the B2B division delivers customised language training for professionals in corporations, public institutions, and healthcare organisations. According to Lingoda’s official About Us page, the platform is supported by over 2,500 certified teachers, delivers around 1 million classes annually, and serves more than 300,000 students.

== Platform and Services ==
=== B2C Services ===
- Lingoda Flex: Monthly subscription allowing learners to book live language tutoring sessions at any time of day.
- Lingoda Sprint: A two-month intensive online language course challenge with a refund incentive for consistent attendance.

=== B2B Services ===
- Tailored programmes for companies, public institutions, and healthcare providers, often delivered as part of employee development, corporate training, or professional integration schemes.

=== General Offering ===
Lingoda provides 100% live, interactive classes 24/7 via video conferencing, taught by instructors holding teaching qualifications and C2-level fluency. Courses align with CEFR levels from A1 to C1, and students can earn CEFR certification upon level completion. The mobile app allows users to book classes, give post-class feedback, and access supplementary self-study materials.

== Lingoda Method ==
Independent reviews describe Lingoda’s methodology as immersive and conversation-driven, with an emphasis on speaking and interaction rather than passive learning. Classes are conducted by native-level teachers based in countries around the world, exposing learners to a range of accents and cultural contexts. Lessons are typically held in small groups of up to five students to maximise speaking opportunities, and are built around downloadable PDFs that include prompts for discussion, vocabulary exercises, and grammar tasks, which students can review in advance.

The approach is designed for flexibility: learners can choose from thousands of class times each month across time zones, allowing them to adapt study schedules to work or personal commitments. Instructors are encouraged to adapt lessons dynamically, lingering on activities that promote communication and skipping those that are less engaging. Some reviewers note, however, that the method’s reliance on live classes may not suit learners seeking self-paced study options or a broader selection of languages.

== Programs and Initiatives ==
- MATCH Programme (2021): Launched to support internationally trained healthcare workers in Germany by improving their language proficiency and helping them obtain professional recognition.
- Match Talent (2022–present): An initiative created in collaboration with Kiron Open Higher Education, designed to support skilled migrants, refugees, and other international professionals in their transition into the German labour market.

== Awards and recognition ==
- The Europas Award – Hottest EdTech Startup (2021)
- EdTech Digest Cool Tool Award (2021)
- EdTech Breakthrough Award – Language Learning Company of the Year (2021)
- LinkedIn Top Startups Germany (2018)
- TIME’s World’s Top EdTech Companies (2024)

== Reception ==
Independent reviews highlight both strengths and areas for improvement. PCMag awarded Lingoda an “Excellent” 4.5/5 rating, praising its affordable pricing, small class sizes, engaging curriculum, and qualified instructors, while noting the limited number of languages offered and the absence of self-paced courses. TechRadar described the Lingoda Sprint programme as “motivating but demanding,” pointing to its strict attendance requirements as both a challenge and a driver of learner commitment. Other reviews from education and language learning app analysts commend Lingoda’s structured approach and CEFR alignment, particularly for students preparing for exams such as the German B2 or C1 test.

== See also ==
- Babbel
- Duolingo
- Language education
- Open English
