= Wahaha Joint Venture Company =

Chinese food and beverage joint venture company

Wahaha Joint Venture Company (娃哈哈合资公司)
- Type: private
- Industry: Food
- Founded: 28 March 1996
- Defunct: 2009
- Successor: Hangzhou Wahaha Group
- Headquarters: Hangzhou, China
- Area served: China
- Key people: Emmanuel Faber (Chairman)
- Products: Dairy products, Water, Soft drinks
- Revenue: €100 million
- Operating income: 5%
- Parent: Groupe Danone, Hangzhou Wahaha Group
- Website: wahaha.com.cn

The Wahaha Joint Venture Company was a food and beverage joint venture company established between the Hangzhou Wahaha Group, the largest beverage producer in China, and Danone, one of the world's largest food conglomerates.

The companies became partners in 1996 in a business model Forbes magazine hailed as a "showcase" joint venture.

As the businesses expanded and became more complex, Danone made several attempts to buy out Wahaha, but was rebuffed. Danone and Wahaha's general manager Zong Qinghou signed a deal in December 2006, allowing Danone to buy a majority stake in the non-JV operations. However, Zong had second thoughts about the deal and reneged, claiming the offer was underpriced. It is alleged that he wanted to squeeze a higher price out of Danone.

In a trademark dispute, Danone filed for arbitration in Stockholm on 9 May 2007. Danone took further legal action by filing a suit in Los Angeles Superior Court against Ever Maple Trading and Hangzhou Hongsheng Beverage Co Ltd on 4 June 2007, companies controlled by Zong's wife and daughter.

On 21 December 2007, Danone and the Chinese partner agreed to suspend their legal battle and resume negotiations. In 2009, Danone Group exited the joint venture by selling their 51% stake to Wahaha Group for an estimated $500 million.

== Background ==
Founded in 1987, Hangzhou Wahaha Group Co. Limited was originally a sales company owned by the government of Hangzhou's Shangcheng District. From its creation, Zong Qinghou has led and grown the business, exercising control over the day-to-day operations. In 1995, Peregrine Investments Holdings introduced Zong to Danone, and discussions about joint ventures began. A joint venture agreement was signed on 28 March 1996. Major parts of the drinks business were injected into the joint venture, and Zong became its chairman whilst remaining the managing director of the holding and operating companies. In the melée of the company's transformation from a state-owned enterprise to a private company, Zong became an important minority shareholder.

=== Joint venture holding structure ===
The foreign partners took 51%, while the Chinese partners held 49% (of which WHH holds 39% and employees own 10%).

==== Foreign partners' holding structure ====
Groupe Danone and Peregrine together invested US$70 million in return for the stake in five joint venture WHH companies. The holding was held through a Singapore registered entity called Jinjia Investments Co (金加投资公司), the board of which consisted of two Danone representatives, and Francis Leung Pak-to (梁伯韬) from Peregrine.

In April 1998, just before the news of Peregrine's collapse broke, Leung was replaced on the board by a third representative from Danone. Although a transfer of shares in the WHH companies would have required State approval under the rules in force at the time for protecting state assets, the shares in Jinjia were not covered. When Peregrine collapsed, and transferred its Jinjia shares, Groupe Danone became majority owner. Zong has alleged that this transfer of ownership was a bad-faith takeover by stealth.

=== Scope of joint venture ===
On 28 March 1996, five joint venture companies were formed:

- Hangzhou Wahaha Baili Foods 杭州娃哈哈百立食品有限公司
- Hangzhou Wahaha Health Foods Co 杭州娃哈哈保健食品有限公司
- Hangzhou Wahaha Foods Co 杭州娃哈哈食品有限公司
- Hangzhou Wahaha Beverages Co 杭州娃哈哈饮料有限公司
- Hangzhou Wahaha Quick Frozen Foods 杭州娃哈哈速冻食品有限公司

The business had grown into 39 joint venture entities by 2007, and the total injected capital amounts to US$131 million.

In 2006, the turnover of the joint ventures contributed €100 million to the top line of Danone, and in excess of 5% of Danone's total net profit.

=== Non-joint venture companies ===
When the joint venture agreement was inked, five other WHH companies remained outside the scope of the joint venture.

At the end of 2006, total non-joint venture companies reportedly had equity of ¥5.6 billion and profits of ¥1.04 billion. In December, Zong had agreed to sell these to Danone for ¥4 billion.

The Hangzhou Wahaha Guangsheng Investment Co. (杭州娃哈哈广盛投资有限公司) ("GUANGSHENG") established in 2003 with registered capital of ¥50 million, is a key non-JV entity. Its shares were held by Zong and the union in a ratio of 60:40. Its capital was later increased to ¥80 million. The following companies were its subsidiaries or associates, with holdings ranging from 39 to 60 percent :

- Hangzhou Wahaha Children's Clothing Co. 杭州娃哈哈童装有限公司, est. 2002
- Changsha Wahaha Beverages Co. 长沙娃哈哈饮料有限公司
- Harbin Shuangcheng Wahaha Foods Co. 哈尔滨双城娃哈哈食品有限公司
- Jian Wahaha Beverages Co. 吉安娃哈哈饮料公司

The shares of Hangzhou Wahaha Children's Clothing Co. (杭州娃哈哈童装有限公司) founded in 2002, were initially held by Guangsheng, but were transferred out in August 2003, in an "interesting series of share transfers". It is now 65% owned by Zong, 10% by his wife, and 25% by Platinum Net Ltd.

The Hangzhou Wahaha Food and Beverage Sales Co. (杭州娃哈哈食品饮料营销有限公司) "WHHFBSC", registered on 19 December 2006, is an external company allegedly now the centre of a parallel distribution network. 10% of its share capital is held by Zong's wife, Shi Youzhen, and 90% by Zong's personal vehicle Ever Maple Trading Ltd., registered in the British Virgin Islands. Its legal representative is Zong's daughter Zong Fuli.

Zong set up non-jv owned factories, such as the Hangzhou Xiushan Shunfa Packaging Co. (杭州萧山顺发食品包装公司), to manufacture or pack products identical to WHH. Danone further alleges that dealers were asked to set up new bank accounts for their deposit payments in the name of WHHFBSC to sell products from these factories.

=== Trademarks ===
The Wahaha trademark was assigned to the main joint venture vehicle on 29 February 1996, and a joint venture agreement was eventually signed on 28 March 1996. Danone insist that the joint venture agreement with valid and exclusive rights of production, distribution and sales of products under the Wahaha brand, for which Danone paid Hangzhou Wahaha Group the sum of RMB 100 million, including 50 million from the joint venture vehicle. Local government approval was obtained. However, WHH maintains that rules in force stipulate that trademark transfer agreements must be approved by the National Trademark Bureau, while local government powers are limited to a veto. The transfer was denied by the National Trademark Bureau according for the rule safeguarding national assets. Although the regulations over the transfer of trademarks was apparently lifted in October 2001, the parties signed an additional contract in October 2005 covering the use of the trademark covering company names and products.

=== Day to day management control ===
Danone agreed to terms of joint venture which did not give it much involvement, allowing the day-to-day running of the company rested in the hands of Zong, while he continued in his autocratic ways. Zong has even boasted about the managers sent by Danone whom he had sent packing.

Danone gave Mr. Zong room to move since "he operates in a very entrepreneurial way, making a lot of decisions on his own." Up until just before the conflict became public, Zong was allowed to pursue his own commercial strategy through external ventures where Danone had no wish to be. However, Danone felt that it was time to claw back a stake in the external ventures.

== Beginning of public row ==
Danone had made several attempts to buy out Zong, but was rebuffed. Danone and Zong signed a deal in December 2006, allowing Danone to buy out the non-JV operations. However, Zong had second thoughts about the deal and reneged, claims he could not carry his co-investors, according to The Wall Street Journal. Zong claims the offer was rejected as it was underpriced, and wanted to squeeze more out of Danone.

On 3 April 2007, the war of words started with an article on Xinhua's website entitled "Wahaha victim of low-ball buyout by Danone" which stated that the board had rejected Danone's attempt at a "hostile takeover" of Wahaha for ¥4 billion. The article was written by a Xinhua journalist to whom Zong had given an "internal reference" document in the hopes of influencing political leaders on the fate of Wahaha.

On 10 April, Danone issued a statement implying that Zong was in breach of his agreement with Danone by having entered into joint ventures with other partners with rights to use the brand. Zong had been accused of selling identical products using the Wahaha brand outside of the joint ventures, and Danone demanded a 51% stake in these. Danone sent a warning letter to Zong, in his capacity as the chairman of the Wahaha joint ventures, giving 30 days for WHH to stop illegally selling products under Wahaha trademark without proper authorization.

Zong said that Emmanuel Faber had personally authorised the setting up of the units outside the scope of the joint ventures. Danone concedes that in around 2003, it allowed Zong to become a minority partner in businesses that made Wahaha products outside their joint-venture structure, apparently because local governments often preferred to have Zong personally as a partner. By 2005, Danone realized Zong controlled as many as 20 external businesses making drinks, and claims these represented approximately 25% of Wahaha products. Danone estimates that Zong had established in excess of 80 unauthorised companies using the WHH brandname between 2001 and 2006.

Zong set up externally owned factories to produce products identical to WHH, and Danone alleges that dealers were asked to set up new bank accounts for their deposit payments in the name of WHHFBSC to sell products from these factories.

Danone, which had apparently been relying on the WHH distribution network to sell Danone brand products, also found itself being the victim of mis-channelling. Since the dispute has erupted, distributors and employees have come out in support of Zong, calling for a boycott of Danone products.

=== Legal moves ===
While Danone has been seeking justice against HWG and Chairman Zong in the international arena, Wahaha has embroiled Danone in multiple attacks at a local subsidiary-level. Political leaders from both countries have called for an amicable solution to the dispute.

Danone filed for arbitration in Stockholm on 9 May. On 4 June, Danone filed suit in Los Angeles Superior Court against Ever Maple Trading and Hangzhou Hongsheng Beverage Co Ltd, as well as Zong's wife and daughter who run the two companies.

Ever Maple Trading Ltd is the controlling shareholder of Hangzhou Hongsheng Beverage, which is the parent company of Hangzhou Wahaha Food and Beverage Sales for damages of US$100 million. Zong resigned as chairman of the joint ventures on 5 June 2007.

However, WHH challenges whether the joint-ventures have title to the WHH brand. Application for arbitration of the dispute with Danone over the trademark had been made to the Hangzhou Arbitration Committee, and was accepted on 17 June.

In August 2007, Hangzhou Wahaha Foods Co, the leading joint venture company, sued the State Trademark Bureau over what it claims was "improper administrative behavior" in 1996 and 1997. However, the case was withdrawn because it fell outside the statute of limitations.

Danone filed claims against 10 companies believed linked to Wahaha in Samoa and the British Virgin Islands. The High Court of the British Virgin Islands placed eight companies registered there into receivership and froze their assets on 9 November. It was reported on 22 November that the assets of two Samoan registered entities were frozen and put into receivership under the order of the Supreme Court of Samoa; Danone won arbitration in Stockholm.

On 10 November, the Hangzhou Arbitration Committee ruled on the technicality that Danone had failed to appeal against its decision not to approve the transfer within the allotted time. The Wahaha labor union, citing fears of some 300 job-losses, also joined the legal fight against Danone. The union accused Danone of holding shares in companies that compete against the two big companies' 39 joint ventures.

On 21 December, under political pressure from the respective governments, Danone and the Chinese partner agreed to suspend their legal battle and resume negotiations.

=== Reasons for the breakdown ===
==== Cultural issues ====
Whilst the surrender of 51% to two foreign partners may have appeared not to interfere with control of the company, Zong resented the takeover of Wahaha by stealth. This is manifested in Zong's nationalistic defense against Danone. Zong occasionally used expressions like "unequal treaties", which are a throwback to the colonial era. However, the Chinese press points out that Zong employs offshore tax havens, and that his daughter is a resident in the United States.

The restrictions contained in contracts and regulations considerably cramped the entrepreneurial style of Zong, who complained of limits the control structure placed on him. "Most of the decisions had to be approved by Danone board members at board meetings once every quarter. How you want me to run the business under such conditions?" The greater maturity in the company has made Zong feel he needs his foreign partner less.

==== Marketing strategy/investment issues ====
The differing marketing choices of the groups contributed to the conflict. Zong is resentful that Danone was happy just to sit back and collect money, and wanted to stop him from investing: "Whenever we wanted to expand the business, they said no. They refused to invest more. But they let us spend the money and then when the ventures made money they wanted in," he says.

Outside the joint venture structure were "a batch of companies which served the old impoverished areas of the west, and in the Three Gorges area. Danone had no desire to be there, but they turned out profitable".

Future Cola was another example: Zong decided to proceed with the launch of a cola in 1998, against the express wishes of Danone. It was tolerated because Qin Peng defended the contribution it made to the joint venture's profits.

==== Conflicts of interest ====
Zong now controls a significant number of companies which make and sell products competing with the joint venture in its markets. Amongst others, Zong controls Hangzhou Xiushan Shunfa Packaging Co. which makes WHH branded products, and WHHFBSC, which is a parallel distribution company.

Interpreting a clause in the JV agreement that the foreign partner must endeavour not to act in detriment to the interests of the JV, Zong is upset that Danone acquired sizeable stakes in many of its competitors, namely China Huiyuan Juice Group, Shenzhen Health Food, Bright Dairy & Food., and a 49% joint venture with Mengniu.

WHH principally objects to Danone's role as owner since 2001 of its largest competitor, Guangdong Robust Group (乐百氏(广东)饮用水有限公司), which is a 92% owned subsidiary, and Shanghai Aquarius Drinking Water Co., Ltd. (上海正广和饮用水有限责任公司), in which it holds 50%. Zong protested to Danone in the year following Danone's acquisition of Robust, when Wahaha allegedly lost 80 million yuan (US$10.5 million).

In July 2007, Shenyang Industrial Development Co., Ltd. (沈阳陵东实业发展总公司), who holds a 5% stake in Shenyang Wahaha Drinks Co, filed in the local courts against Danone nominated director since 1996, Qin Peng (秦鹏), for being a director of some twenty competing entities without board approval.

==== The final straw ====
A Commerce Department official who was asked for comment said he believed the dispute was not inherently commercial nor contractual, but was more to do with "fault".

An article published in Caijing in May 2007 hinted that there may have been impropriety: Profits were siphoned off into factories and other external ventures in breach of the joint venture agreement; shareholdings were shuffled around to the detriment of other shareholders.

Although Danone may have offered to buy out the external ventures for the quoted ¥4 billion, this payment was considered an olive-branch to end the irregularities. In failing to obtain a follow-through, and in the light of a media assault by Zong, Danone had run out of options for an amicable solution to the dispute.

The dispute took on a personal dimension when Danone filed in Los Angeles against his wife and 25-year-old daughter, who represented interests which owned the external ventures. Zong accused Danone of trying to destroy his family.

In 2009, Danone Group exited the joint venture by selling their 51% stake in Wahaha Group to Wahaha Group for an estimated $500 million.

== Timeline ==
- 28 March 1996, joint venture agreement signed
- 1998, Peregrine collapsed, Groupe DANONE becomes majority owner.
- December 2006, Danone and Zong allegedly signed a deal allowing Danone to buy out the companies "external" to the JV operations
- January 2007 Zong denounces deal
- 9 April 2007 Danone sent a warning letter to the chairman of the Wahaha joint ventures, giving 30 days for WHH to stop illegally selling products under Wahaha trademark without proper authorization
- 11 April Zong accuses Danone of "hostile takeover" of Wahaha
- 9 May, Danone filed a suit in Stockholm.
- 4 June, Danone filed suit in Los Angeles against several parties connected to Zong for damages of US$100 million.
- 5 June, Zong resigned as chairman of the joint ventures
- 17 June, Hangzhou Arbitration Committee accepts application for arbitration
- 22 June Chinese partners on joint venture board refuse to endorse appointment of Emmanuel Faber as chairman to replace Zong
- 12 July, lawyers representing Danone hold press conference accusing Zong of using forgery to set up offshore companies
- 9 November, the High Court of the British Virgin Islands placed Golden Dynasty Enterprise Ltd, Gold Factory Developments Ltd, Platinum Net Ltd, Sunworld Enterprises Ltd, Great Base International Ltd, Bountiful Gold Trading Ltd, Ever Maple Trading Ltd and Wintell Enterprises Ltd. into receivership and froze their assets
- 14 November (or 21?), Mega Source Investments Ltd and Honour Bright Investments Ltd, were frozen and put into receivership by the Supreme Court of Samoa

== See also ==
- Britannia Industries
