= Troy Kopp =

American gridiron football player (born 1971)

No. 13
- Position: Quarterback

Personal information
- Born: August 21, 1971 (age 55); Madison, Wisconsin, U.S.
- Listed height: 6 ft 1 in (1.85 m)
- Listed weight: 200 lb (91 kg)

Career information
- High school: Mission Viejo (Mission Viejo, California)
- College: Pacific
- NFL draft: 1993: undrafted

Career history
- Memphis Pharaohs (1995); Anaheim Piranhas (1996); Winnipeg Blue Bombers (1998–1999); Calgary Stampeders (2000)

Awards and highlights
- All-Big West (1991)
- Stats at ArenaFan.com

Troy Kopp (born August 21, 1971) is an American former professional football quarterback who played in the Arena Football League (AFL) and Canadian Football League (CFL). He played for the Memphis Pharaohs, Anaheim Piranhas, Winnipeg Blue Bombers, and Calgary Stampeders. He played college football at the University of the Pacific.

== Early life ==
Kopp attended Mission Viejo High School. As a freshman in 1985, his life was impacted after his father lost his job, forcing the family to spend their summer sleeping either in a tent or a van. Kopp lived with three different families, over the next 3 years, while attending school.

As a senior, he was the top-rated quarterback in Orange County and was named All-Southern in baseball. He also selected by the Montreal Expos in the 58th-round as a catcher.

== College career ==
Kopp accepted a football scholarship from the University of the Pacific. As a true freshman, he started 9 out of 11 games, registering 138-of-241 completions (57.3%) for 1,510 yards, 11 touchdowns and 8 interceptions.

As a sophomore, he sprained his left shoulder in the season opening loss against the University of Tennessee, forcing him to miss two games. After learning he wouldn't start the fourth game against Long Beach State over quarterback Kris King, he quit the team and had to be persuaded to come back by head coach Walt Harris. He regained his starting job in the fifth game against the University of Nevada, Las Vegas. He made 31-of-52 completions for 515 yards and 7 passing touchdowns (school record) against Cal State-Fullerton. He passed for a Big West Conference single-game record of 564 yards against New Mexico State University, at the time it was the 10th best mark in college football history. He became the first quarterback to have back-to-back 500-yard games in the air in NCAA history. He ran a version of the run and shoot offense known as "Air Pacific", ranking third in the nation in total offense, passing yards and passing touchdowns per game. He finished with 244-of-428 completions (57.0%) for 3,311 yards, 31 touchdowns and 14 interceptions. In baseball, the Montreal Expos selected him again in the 12th round of the amateur draft.

As a junior in 1991, he posted 275-of-449 completions (61.2%) for 3,767 yards, 37 touchdowns and 16 interceptions. He led the NCAA in touchdown passes with 37, at the time the 18th most in NCAA history.

As a senior, he sprained his ankle before the team's fifth game while playing Wallyball, a hybrid of handball and volleyball, forcing him to miss three games. He set an NCAA career mark for most scores by a tandem with wide receiver Aaron Turner during the season. Kopp made 141-of-256 completions (55.1%) for 1,670 yards, 8 touchdowns and 9 interceptions.

He finished his college career owning most of the school's passing records, including passing yards in a game (564), passing yards in a single-season (3,767), passing yards in a career (10,258), touchdown passes in a single-season (37), touchdown passes in a career (87), completion percentage in a single-season (61.2%) and completion percentage in a career (58.1%). His career touchdown total of 87 ranked 12th most in NCAA history. He also competed in baseball.

In 2007, he was inducted into the University of the Pacific Athletic Hall of Fame.

== Professional career ==
Kopp played two seasons with the San Jose SaberCats and Memphis Pharaohs in the Arena Football League. He set a league record with 34 completions in a single-game.

In August 1998, he signed with the Winnipeg Blue Bombers of the Canadian Football League. Against the Saskatchewan Roughriders, he replaced T. J. Rubley late in the third quarter and orchestrated four touchdown drives in the fourth, for a 36–35 come from behind victory. He was released in December 1999.

On April 24, 2000, he was signed by the Calgary Stampeders. He threw 5 interceptions against the Edmonton Eskimos. In two starts and other relief appearances, he collected 53-of-99 passes completions for 722 yards, one touchdown and 10 interceptions. He was released by the Stampeders on September 18. He later suffered life threatening injuries in a car accident on September 27, but was able to recover.

== Personal life ==
After retiring from professional football, he became an assistant football coach at San Clemente High School. As of 2026, he continues as the Offensive Coordinator and QB coach at San Clemente High School.

== See also ==
- List of NCAA major college football yearly passing leaders
