= Rudy Holmes =

American football player (born 1952)

No. 36
- Position: Defensive back

Personal information
- Born: July 19, 1952 (age 74); Oakland, California
- Listed height: 5 ft 10 in (1.78 m)
- Listed weight: 178 lb (81 kg)

Career information
- High school: Mission Viejo (CA)
- College: Drake

Career history
- Atlanta Falcons (1974); Southern California Sun (1975)
- Stats at Pro Football Reference

Rudy Holmes (born July 19, 1952) is an American former football defensive back. He played for the Atlanta Falcons in 1974 and for the Southern California Sun in 1975.
