= Greg Popovich =

American business executive

- Education: Master of Business Administration
- Alma mater: Pepperdine University
- Occupation: Business executive
- Website: CastleRockWinery.com

Greg Popovich is an American business executive in the wine industry. He is the founder and owner of Castle Rock Winery.

== Career ==
Popovich began his career in the wine business working at Lost Hills (Acampo/Lodi). He also worked for La Crema (Sonoma), which had purchased Lost Hills.

Popovich moved on to the staff of Winterbrook (Sierra Nevada Foothills) where he worked as a marketing executive before forming Castle Rock Winery in 1994. He founded Castle Rock under a business model that would allow him to run the business from the South Bay of Los Angeles.

As of 2019, the winery produced over 360,000 annual cases and was one of the 50 largest wine companies out of more than 10,000 wineries in the United States.

== Background ==
Popovich grew up in Redondo Beach, California graduated from South Torrance High School where he was a 4 year Letterman in Varsity Tennis. He holds AA degree in the Administration of Justice from El Camino College and graduated the police academy as a level one police officer. Popovich also has an MBA from Pepperdine University.

He currently resides in Rolling Hills, California with his wife Adriana and three children.

== See also ==
- List of Pepperdine University people
