= Future Cola =

Chinese cola drink

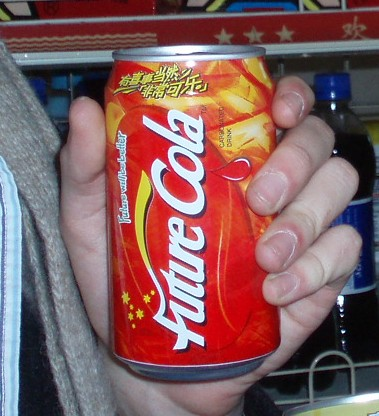
- A can of Future Cola. The phrase "Future will be better" is visible on the left.
- Type: Soft drink
- Manufacturer: Hangzhou Wahaha Group; Reed's, Inc.
- Origin: China
- Introduced: 1998; 28 years ago
- Flavour: Cola
- Variants: Cherry Cola
- Website: www.wahaha.com.cn/#/Products/co2

Future Cola is a cola-flavoured carbonated beverage manufactured by Hangzhou Wahaha Group of China, where its market share is 12–15%, making it the third-largest manufacturer of soft drinks in China behind Coca-Cola and Pepsi Cola. It is distributed by Reed's, Inc., in the United States as China Cola.

In China it is sold under the name Future Cola (Chinese: 非常可乐; pinyin: fēicháng kělè; lit. 'Very (Happy) Cola'), the patriotic by-line "The Chinese people's own cola", and the slogan "the future will be better".

== Markets ==
=== China ===
Wahaha started making its own cola in 1998. Feichang Kele (translated as Extreme Cola or, more commonly, Future Cola, for its sound) tastes like a cross between Coca-Cola and Pepsi, but bears a red and white label. Through Wahaha's extensive distribution network, Future Cola dominates rural China and its second- and third-line cities. Sales in 2003 amounted to 620 million litres, approximately 35% and 70% of the volumes of Coca-Cola and Pepsi-Cola respectively.

In China, Wahaha adopted three main marketing techniques. First, its advertisements adopt a nationalistic tone. Copy promotes Future Cola as "Chinese people's own cola" and incites consumers to select it over Coke or Pepsi. Future Cola's focus on rural areas gave the product high penetration at lower costs. It also uses celebrity advertising. Its penetration pricing made it an affordable alternative to its rivals, particularly in the more price-sensitive rural areas.

=== International markets ===
Wahaha works with a trading and distribution company in Taiwan and completed a factory for its cola products in Indonesia. Cola has joined other Wahaha products to be exported to France, Germany, Hong Kong, Italy, Japan, Malaysia, the Netherlands, Spain, Taiwan, Thailand, and the United States.
