= Greg Genske =

American baseball player agent

Gregory B. Genske is a lawyer and Major League Baseball Players Association certified player representative. In July 2020, Genske merged his GEM Agency with Gary Vaynerchuk's VaynerSports to create VaynerBaseball. Genske serves as VaynerBaseball's CEO and oversees all of VaynerSports' baseball player representation activities. In October 2019, Genske launched the GEM Agency in partnership with Hicks Equity Partners, the private equity arm of Tom Hicks and his family. Prior to launching GEM, Genske was executive director and President of Baseball for The Legacy Agency. Since 2015, Genske has served as a law professor at the University of California-Berkeley, his alma-mater, teaching classes on sports law, representing professional athletes and negotiations. In 2009, Genske was named to Sports Business Daily's prestigious 40 under 40 list.

== Education and personal life ==
Greg Genske was born and raised in Southern California, where he attended Diamond Bar High School and then Pepperdine University. He subsequently received his J.D. from the University of California at Berkeley School of Law. Prior to entering the sports industry in 2004, Genske practiced with two leading national law firms as a trial attorney and also negotiated multi-million-dollar transactions on behalf of emerging growth and Fortune 500 companies. Genske lives in Laguna Beach, California.

== LS Legacy Sports Group ==
In 2004, Genske succeeded Jeff Moorad as the CEO of Moorad Sports Management at the time owned by Canadian firm Loring Ward (formerly Assante). Soon after Moorad's 2004 departure, Genske and partners Brian Peters and Scott Parker purchased Moorad Sports Management from Loring Ward and renamed it LS Legacy Sports Group. Genske served as the lead negotiator for the contracts signed by LS Legacy Sports Group clients dating back to the fall of 2004. Genske advised amateur athletes in the MLB and NFL drafts, including the first pick overall in the 2004 and 2008 MLB drafts and the 2015 NFL draft (Jameis Winston). Known as a tough negotiator, Genske has been able to draw upon his broad legal experience in negotiations in order to secure maximum compensation for professional athletes. He has negotiated many premiere MLB contacts including the record-setting deal for CC Sabathia (The largest contract in history for a pitcher, both in total value and average annual value.) and over $4 billion in playing contracts.

== The Legacy Agency ==
The Legacy Agency was formed in January 2012 with the merger of LS Legacy Sports Group and sports marketing firm The Agency.
