= Castle Rock Winery =

Winery in Geyserville, California

- Location: Torrance, California, USA
- Other labels: Dressage
- Founded: 1994
- Key people: Greg Popovich, Founder & President
- Cases/yr: 350,000
- Varietals: Cabernet Sauvignon, Pinot Noir, Chardonnay, Sauvignon Blanc
- Distribution: National
- Website: CastleRockWinery.com

Castle Rock Winery is a wine producer and online vendor. Its corporate office is in Torrance, California.

== Background ==
Castle Rock Winery was established in 1994 by Greg Popovich. The wines are made from Oregon, Washington, and California grapes. All the wines are produced and bottled at partner wineries such as the Francis Ford Coppola facility in Sonoma County.

Popovich grew up in Redondo Beach, California, and graduated from South Torrance High School where he was a 4-year Letterman in Varsity Tennis. He holds an AA degree in the Administration of Justice from El Camino College and graduated from the police academy as a level one police officer. Popovich also has an MBA from Pepperdine University.

He resides in Rolling Hills, California with his wife Adriana and three children.

The winemaker is Meghan Rech. Castle Rock Winery has been featured in Business Monthly.

Castle Rock Winery has also been featured in the San Francisco Chronicle in 2005 and was among the Value Brands of the Year by Wine & Spirits magazine in 2016.
