= Zong Qinghou =

Chinese businessman (1945–2024)

- 宗庆后
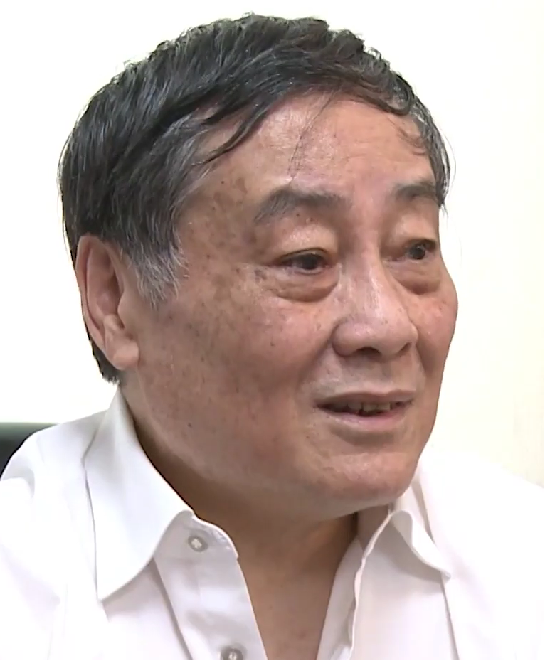
- Zong in 2024

Delegate to the National People's Congress
- In office 2002–2018

Personal details
- Born: 11 October 1945 Suqian, Jiangsu, China
- Died: 25 February 2024 (aged 78) Hangzhou, Zhejiang, China
- Party: Chinese Communist Party
- Spouses: Shi Youen (m. 1981; div. 2005); Jane Jianying Du (m. 2005)
- Children: 7
- Occupation: Businessman

Chinese name
- Simplified Chinese: 宗庆后
- Traditional Chinese: 宗慶後
Transcriptions
Standard Mandarin
- Hanyu Pinyin: Zōng Qìnghòu

Zong Qinghou (Chinese: 宗庆后; 11 October 1945 – 25 February 2024) was a Chinese billionaire businessman, and the founder, chairman and CEO of the Hangzhou Wahaha Group, China's leading beverage company. As of March 2022, his net worth was estimated at US$8.7 billion.

== Biography ==
Zong was born on 11 October 1945, into a poor family in Zhejiang, and he had little formal education. Because of the family's poverty, Zong had to drop out of middle school. Zong was part of the sent-down movement and worked in Zhoushan at a salt farm. In his spare time, Zong read and studied communist texts including The Collected Works of Mao Zedong and How the Steel was Tempered by Nikolai Ostrovsky.

In 1979, Zong returned home upon the retirement of his mother, who was a school teacher. He eventually returned to Hangzhou, and only found menial work at a local school due to the low level of his education. In 1987, he targeted a minigrocery in a school in Shangcheng District, Hangzhou, selling milk. Zong headed the embryonic Wahaha business, which distributed fizzy soft drinks, ice and stationery. Together with two retired schoolteachers, he borrowed the sum of CNY 140,000, to start producing milk drinks for distribution.

Zong obtained independence from an early government partner by stressing his links with Danone. With his autocratic style and workaholic ethic, he built Wahaha into the largest beverage manufacturer in the People's Republic of China.

The WHH joint venture entered into with Groupe Danone involved the inward investment of US$70 million in five joint venture companies in exchange for 51% Groupe Danone ownership in each company. The trademark agreement signed on 29 February 1996 gave the JVs the exclusive rights of production, distribution and sales of products under the Wahaha brand. Collaboration has grown into 39 joint venture entities by 2007.

In 2007, the relationship turned sour. Danone had accused Wahaha of "secretly operating a set of parallel companies that mirrored the joint venture's operations with virtually identical products and siphoned off as much as $100 million from the partnership." Danone and Wahaha reached a settlement and dissolved their partnership. Zong resigned as chairman of the joint ventures on 5 June 2007.

Forbes named Zong as China's richest man in 2010. He was ranked as China's richest man in 2012 and second-richest in 2013, according to the China Rich List, published by Hurun Report.

== Personal life ==
Zong Qinghou obituary, China News Service.

Zong served as a delegate to the Chinese National People's Congress from 2002 to 2018.

Zong was married to Shi Youzhen (施幼珍), and they had one child, a daughter, Fuli (Kelly) Zong (宗馥莉). Shi was purchasing manager at Wahaha. Zong once held permanent resident status in the United States, which he had obtained to make it easier for him to travel to the country and look after his investments there. His daughter attended Pepperdine University in Southern California and was naturalized as a U.S. citizen, but later moved back to China and in 2007 began the procedure to renounce her U.S. citizenship. Zong gained wide support as he played the role of "David" against a French "Goliath" gobbling up Chinese companies. However, with the revelation of his green card in 2008, public perceptions changed and his reputation suffered. In 2013, he stated that because he did not re-enter the U.S. for several years, his status was thus deemed abandoned.

Zong stated that he lived on less than $6,000 per year, attributing his thriftiness to the teachings of Mao Zedong. Zong also emphasized cost-cutting measures in his approach to business, describing cost control as a key element in Wahaha's operations.But this is all a facade and when he died in 2024, it was revealed that he had a second secret family (including 3 children) and real estates abroad, including the United States.

Zong Qinghou died on 25 February 2024, at the age of 78.

=== Tax evasion allegations ===
Zong claimed to have been paid a salary of €3,000 and €100,000 annual allowances plus a bonus worth 1% of the annual profit of the joint ventures, totaling 70 million yuan of income every year.

Caijing reported in April 2008 that Zong was being investigated for allegedly evading taxes amounting to some ¥ 300 million. An investigator had alleged that Zong "...earned far more than this and hasn't fully reported the tax for years". Caijing implied there may have been less than transparent payments through a web of Hong Kong-registered accounts of Zong, Shi, daughter Fuli, and the former Party secretary of Wahaha, Du Jianying. Zong had apparently paid more than 200 million yuan in back taxes in October 2007, after the investigation kicked off. However, the magazine suspected Zong still owed millions more.

== Honorary titles ==
List of titles:

- National Excellent Entrepreneur
- National Excellent Manager
- Model of Patriotism to Support the Armed Forces
- Outstanding Builder of Socialism with Chinese Characteristics
- The First Chinese Entrepreneurs Entrepreneurship Prize
