= Joel Widzer =

American author (born 1961)

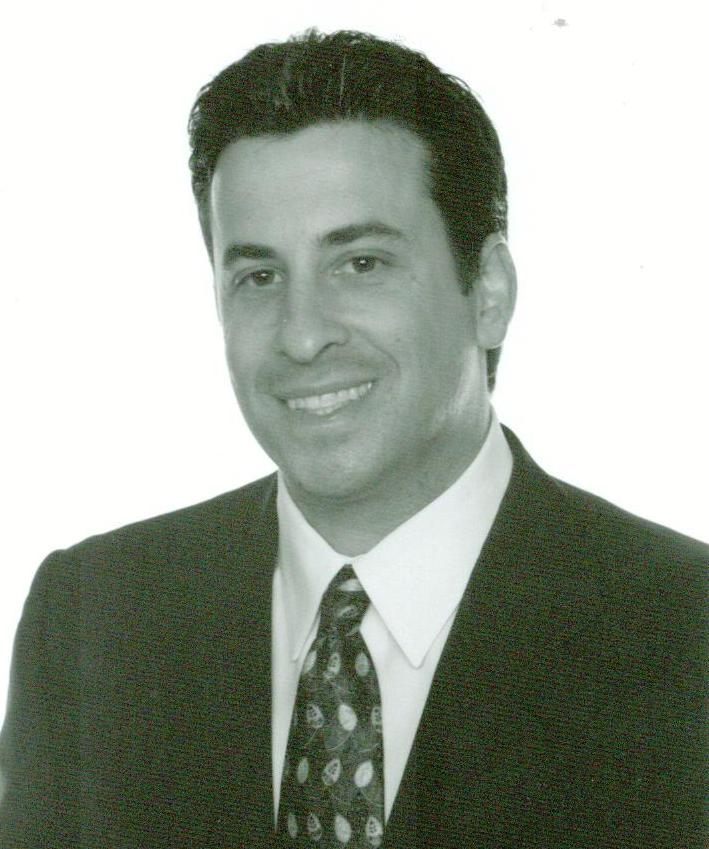
- Born: 1961 (age 64–65)
- Occupation: Travel strategist
- Writing career
- Genres: Travel Advice, Consumer Advocacy
- Notable work: The Penny Pincher's Passport to Luxury Travel
- Website: www.jetready.com

Joel Widzer (born August 25, 1961) is an American author of travel-related literature, consultant, and travel strategist. In 1999, he wrote The Penny Pincher's Passport to Luxury Travel. He is currently the managing partner of JlwConsulting a division of JetReady LLC.

Widzer pioneered the experiential travel mindset by writing about luxury travel at a discount. Prior to his work the conventional wisdom among travelers' was to get the lowest priced travel without concern about the experience. His efforts in seeking the value proposition of travel were precursors to what eventually evolved into a new body of travel discussing luxury at a discount. Most notable are his strategies for obtaining first class upgrades which has been profiled in USA Today, The Wall Street Journal, and the TV show Inside Edition.

== Critique ==
While writing for MSNBC and Tripso.com, Widzer was widely criticized in travel blogs as an apologist or shill for the airlines.

Critics of Widzer cite that his work often takes a positive position towards airlines and that he strongly promotes adherence to airline loyalty programs. His philosophy is that loyalty is rewarded by travel providers which in turn generate enhanced perks and services for those consumers who are loyal. Critics argue that customer loyalty is dead in the airline industry and therefore there is no reason to be loyal. Widzer counters this position with his experience of traveling approximately 250,000 miles a year with over 3 million frequent fliers miles and travels to over 103 individual countries. He claims that he is upgraded on all of his airline flights due to his loyalty.
