= Open English =

Online English school

- Company type: Private
- Industry: English language online education
- Founded: Caracas, Venezuela; September 2006
- Founder: Andrés Moreno, Nicolette Rankin, and Wilmer Samiento
- Headquarters: Coconut Grove, Florida
- Area served: Worldwide
- Key people: Andrés Moreno (CEO)
- Website: www.openenglish.com

Open English is an online English-language learning platform, primarily serving users in Latin America and Hispanic Americans in the United States. In recent years, the company has also expanded its offering into Europe and Asia. The platform currently operates in more than 30 countries worldwide. Since its inception, it has enrolled over 2 million students in its courses.

Open English is headquartered in Miami, with additional offices in Mexico City, Bogotá, Buenos Aires, Istanbul, Bangalore, Vietnam and São Paulo.

== History ==
Open English was founded in 2006 in Caracas, Venezuela, by Andrés Moreno, Nicolette Rankin, and Wilmer Sarmiento.

The founders recognized the limitations of conventional English language education and the potential of online learning. After initial struggles, the company began to expand, securing venture capital funding. In 2009, Open English moved its headquarters to Miami, Florida, and has since expanded across Latin America, the U.S. Hispanic market, Europe, Middle East, and Asia. The COVID-19 pandemic marked a significant surge in demand for online learning, contributing to Open English's growth.

Open English reported revenues of US$77 million in 2020. The company was valued at approximately US$350 million as of 2019. It enrolled more than 150,000 new students in the first half of 2021, bringing the total number of students to over 2 million. Open English has also secured corporate partnerships with more than 2,000 enterprise clients and has a global network of over 2,000 native English-speaking teachers.

Open English has engaged in various social impact initiatives. Notably, in 2023, the company partnered with Brazilian soccer player Richarlison to donate $400,000 worth of English courses to underprivileged youth in Brazil. Additionally, Open English has donated over $170,000 in scholarships to the AlumnUSB association, supporting students in Venezuela.

The company also presented a confidential initial public offering (IPO) in the United States. The recent acquisitions, including that of English Ninjas, mark a strategic move to expand into Europe, Middle East, and Asia, where it is planning to enter the Vietnamese market with its English courses for businesses.

== Acquisitions ==
Open English has acquired several companies. Notable acquisitions include:

- Next University (United States, acquired in January 2015): Specializing in digital skills development courses, this acquisition expanded Open English's educational scope.
- English Ninjas (Turkey, acquired in December 2021): This acquisition helped Open English establish a significant presence in the Turkish market and the broader Middle East region.
- Enguru (India, acquired in September 2022): Enguru, a mobile language-learning platform, marked Open English's entry into the rapidly growing Indian market.

== Services and products ==
The platform offers live, online English classes with native-speaking teachers, available 24/7. Its proprietary technology facilitates personalized learning experiences, catering to individual student needs. Open English has diversified its offerings to include Open English Junior for younger learners and Open English Business for corporate language training. In 2015, the company expanded its educational scope by acquiring Next University, offering digital skills development courses. More recently, Open English launched Open Mundo, providing live classes in French, Italian, Spanish, and Portuguese.

== Media coverage and recognition ==
Open English has been featured in various publications in the US and Latin America, including TechCrunch, Colombian newspaper Diario La República, The Miami Herald, and interviews with CEO Andrés Moreno on MASTV, El País, CNN, BBC, and others. The company has also received several awards, such as the 2011 Education Software Review, the 2011 David Riley Award for Innovation in Business English, and the International E-Learning Award: Academic Division.

== See also ==
- Language education
