= Hangzhou Wahaha Group =

Chinese beverage production group

Hangzhou Wahaha Group Co., Ltd.
- Type: Privately held company
- Industry: Food
- Founded: 1987
- Headquarters: Hangzhou, Zhejiang, China
- Key people: Zong Qinghou, Chairman & CEO
- Products: Dairy products, water, soft drinks
- Revenue: RMB 67.8 billion (2011)
- Operating income: RMB 3.2 billion (2006)
- Number of employees: 30,000
- Website: en.wahaha.com.cn

Hangzhou Wahaha Group Co., Ltd. (WHH; Chinese: 杭州娃哈哈集团有限公司) is a private group of companies, and the largest beverage producer in China. The company is headquartered in Hangzhou, Zhejiang.

Wahaha has roughly 150 subsidiary companies and 60 manufacturing bases scattered throughout China. Wahaha employs about 60,000 staff.

The company was originally a local government owned sales company founded in 1987–8. For most of the time since creation, it has been run by Zong Qinghou (宗庆后), who exercised operational control over the day-to-day operations.

== History ==
Wahaha has its origins in the sales department of the Shangcheng District School in Hangzhou, which was founded in 1987. A factory, the "Hangzhou Wahaha Nutritional Foods Factory" (杭州娃哈哈营养食品厂), was created in 1989 to tap a niche in the market for a "children's liquid nutrient" (儿童营养口服液). Although there were 38 producers of liquid nutrients on the market, none were specifically for children. The advertising campaign struck a note with single child Chinese parents, and was a runaway success. In 1991, the factory was merged with the ailing "Hangzhou Canned Food Factory" (杭州罐头食品厂) in a social restructuring, but which increased the overheads of the business.

In 1992, Zong sought an initial public offering for Wahaha, but the Chinese stock market was not yet developed and few businesses qualified to be listed. The effort failed.

In May 1992, Wahaha raised CNY236 million internally in order to start the Hangzhou Wahaha Food City Co. Ltd. (杭州娃哈哈美食城股份有限公司), and to finance the construction of Wahaha Food City, in Hangzhou. Due to inexperience in project management, cashflow became a problem, as construction was delayed for 6 years. This company holds the interests of the employees' union. It changed its name to ZHI at an EGM in August 2001.

During the period from 1992 to 1994, WHH shifted the company away from health drinks to other products. During this period it launched a sour plum drink, alcoholic beverages and pseudo-medicinal potions, but these would successively fail.

In 1994, the company acquired three insolvent companies in Sichuan, and established its first factory in Chongqing. A local manufacturing base enabled the company to reduce distribution costs to western China. Once talks had started with Danone, capital became available once again for the company. WHH launched Wahaha Pure Water and struck gold with it. Over the next three years, WHH would acquire 40 more companies in 22 different provincial cities, transforming it into one of the largest beverage companies in China.

=== Joint ventures ===
In 1995, Peregrine Investments Holdings introduced Zong to Danone, and discussions about the creation of a joint venture began. The Wahaha trademark was assigned to the main joint venture vehicle on 29 February 1996, and a joint venture agreement was eventually signed on 28 March 1996.

The "foreign partners" took 51%, while the "Chinese partners" held 49% (of which WHH holds 39% and employees own 10%). Groupe Danone and Peregrine together invested US$70 million in return for the stake in five joint venture WHH companies with the exclusive rights of production, distribution and sales of products under the Wahaha brand. When Peregrine collapsed in 1998, Groupe DANONE acquired its stake in the JVs, and became majority owner.

The business had grown into 39 joint venture entities by 2007, and the total injected capital amounts to US$131 million.

Since April 2007, Wahaha has been engaged in a public dispute with Danone, its JV partner. Danone has accused Zong of selling identical products using the Wahaha brand outside of the joint ventures, and demands a 51% stake in these. The matter was closed on 30 September 2009.

=== Going it alone ===
Since the dispute began, Wahaha has launched products under different brands. Earlier the company released new beverage products under the name of Nutri-Express Drink and Wahaha Smoothie. U-Yo Milk Coffee has now been launched with a "Qili" logo. The producer was a new company rather than the Wahaha Group. More products are likely to be rebranded with the new logo.

== Products and distribution ==
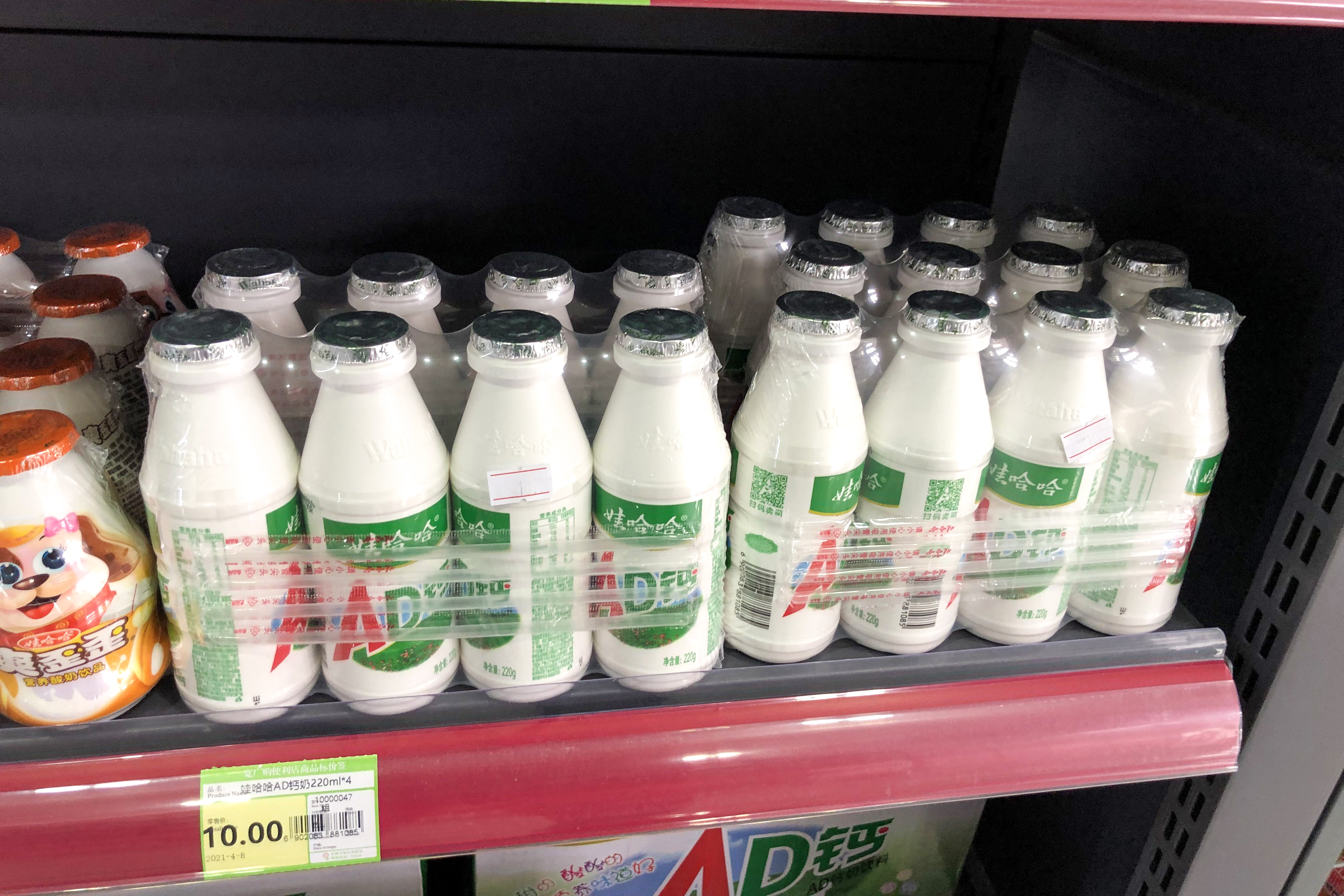
Wahaha Vitamin A&D Calcium Milk Beverage, one of the best-selling products of Wahaha

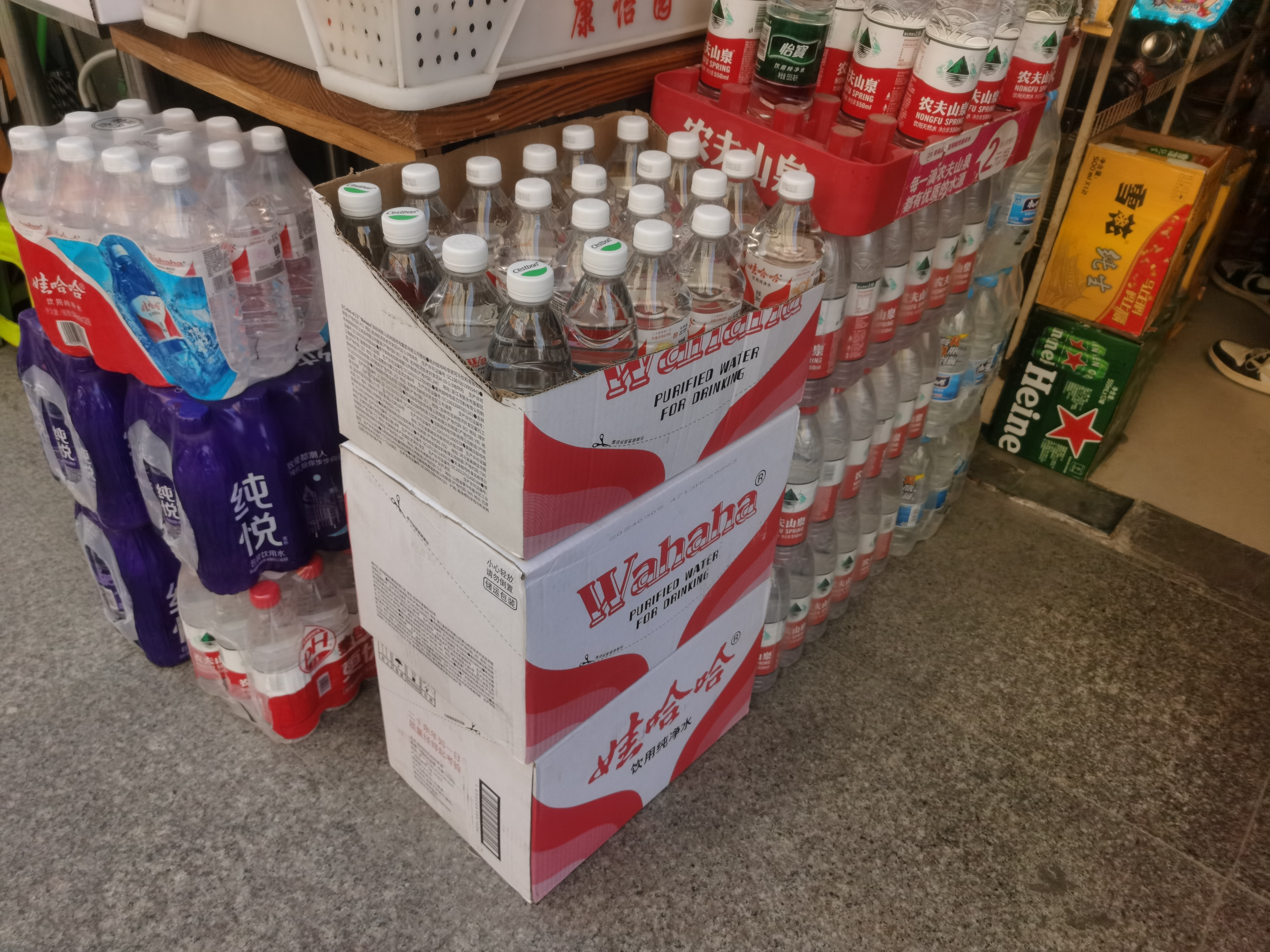
Wahaha Purified Drinking Water

Wahaha branded products include milk drinks (19%), soft drinks, bottled water (43%), bottled tea (19%), fruit juice (13%), porridges and its flagship yoghurt beverages (7%).

Its largest facility is located in Hangzhou's Xiasha Economic and Technological Development Zone, where one-third of the company's production occurs.

Wahaha dealers help them with management and marketing and advertises nationally. The company has 35 provincial sales offices, 2,500 sales team employees, Its distribution is truly nationwide. Wahaha is one of 3 brands which has few distribution gaps in rural China, with more than 2 million sales outlets across the country. Distributors are responsible for capital, storage, and delivery. The company maintains two grades of distributors: more than 1,500 first-level dealers that need to meet distribution targets and manage large networks and capital; and 12,000 second-level dealers that deal at smaller levels. Distributors' franchise areas are strictly delimited to ensure no poaching between areas, and are guaranteed by forfeitable deposits lodged with Wahaha.

The distribution has given "Future Cola" a close third in national market share through its domination of rural China, its tertiary and secondary cities. According to PRC government statistics, Coca-Cola held a 24 percent market share in 2003.

Its products are distributed in major Chinatowns.

== Ownership structure ==
=== Holding company ===
The Hangzhou Wahah Group Co. Ltd. was 29.4% owned by Zong, 24.6% by the employees and management as represented by Zhejiang Wahaha Industries Joint-stock Co. ("ZHI") (浙江娃哈哈实业股份有限公司), and 46% by Shangcheng District Government. Zong's shares are controlled by British Virgin Islands registered Ever Maple Trading Ltd. (恒枫) through Hangzhou Hongsheng Beverage Co Ltd (杭州娃哈哈广盛投资公司). Ever Maple's legal representative is Zong's daughter Zong Fuli.

== Other "Wahaha companies" ==
Whilst the group has many subsidiaries, both local and foreign registered, there are also a number of entities which were essentially private companies owned or controlled by Zong. These companies are the subject of the dispute with the foreign partner. At the end of 2006, total non-joint venture companies reportedly had equity of ¥5.6 billion and profits of ¥1.04 billion. In December, Zong had agreed to sell these to Danone for ¥4 billion.

The Hangzhou Wahaha Guangsheng Investment Co. (杭州娃哈哈广盛投资有限公司) ("GUANGSHENG") established in 2003 with registered capital of ¥50 million, is a key non-JV entity. Its shares were held by Zong and the union in a ratio of 60:40. Its capital was later increased to ¥80 million. The following companies, inter alia, were its subsidiaries or associates, with holdings ranging from 39 to 60 percent:

- Hangzhou Wahaha Children's Clothing Co. 杭州娃哈哈童装有限公司, est. 2002
- Changsha Wahaha Beverages Co. 长沙娃哈哈饮料有限公司
- Harbin Shuangcheng Wahaha Foods Co. 哈尔滨双城娃哈哈食品有限公司
- Jian Wahaha Beverages Co. 吉安娃哈哈饮料有限公司

The shares of Hangzhou Wahaha Children's Clothing Co. (杭州娃哈哈童装有限公司) founded in 2002, were initially held by Guangsheng, but were transferred out in August 2003, in an "interesting series of share transfers". It was 65% owned by Zong, 10% by his wife, and 25% by Platinum Net Ltd.

The Hangzhou Wahaha Food and Beverage Sales Co. (杭州娃哈哈食品饮料营销有限公司) "WHHFBSC", registered on 19 December 2006, is an external company allegedly now the centre of a parallel distribution network. 10% of its share capital is held by Zong's wife, Shi Youzhen, and 90% by Ever Maple Trading Ltd.

Zong set up non-jv owned factories, such as the Hangzhou Xiushan Shunfa Packaging Co. (杭州萧山顺发食品包装公司), to manufacture or pack products identical to WHH. Danone alleges that distributors were asked to set up new bank accounts for their deposit payments in the name of WHHFBSC to sell products from these factories.

=== Offshore companies ===
These offshore companies have been reported as being subsidiaries of the Wahaha Group, and have been seized in their respective domiciles:

British Virgin Islands: Golden Dynasty Enterprise Ltd, Gold Factory Developments Ltd, Platinum Net Ltd, Sunworld Enterprises Ltd, Great Base International Ltd, Bountiful Gold Trading Ltd and Wintell Enterprises Ltd.

Samoa: Mega Source Investments Ltd and Honour Bright Investments Ltd
